= Delta Telescopii =

The Bayer designation Delta Telescopii (δ Tel, δ Telescopii) is shared by two stars in the southern constellation Telescopium. They are separated by 0.16° on the sky.

- δ^{1} Telescopii
- δ^{2} Telescopii
