= Telescopium in Chinese astronomy =

Constellation

The modern constellation Telescopium lies across one of the quadrants symbolized by the Black Tortoise of the North (北方玄武, Běi Fāng Xuán Wǔ), and The Southern Asterisms (近南極星區, Jìnnánjíxīngōu), that divide the sky in traditional Chinese uranography.

The name of the western constellation in modern Chinese is 望遠鏡座 (wàng yuǎn jìng zuò), meaning "the telescope constellation".

== Stars ==
The map of Chinese constellation in constellation Telescopium area consists of :

Four Symbols	Mansion (Chinese name)	Romanization	Translation	Asterisms (Chinese name)	Romanization	Translation	Western star name	Chinese star name	Romanization	Translation
Black Tortoise of the North (北方玄武)	斗	Dǒu	Dipper	鱉	Biē	River Turtle	α Tel	鱉二	Biēyī	1st star
-	近南極星區 (non-mansions)	Jìnnánjíxīngōu (non-mansions)	The Southern Asterisms (non-mansions)	波斯	Bōsī	Persia	HD 187420	波斯一	Bōsīyī	1st star

== See also ==
- Traditional Chinese star names
- Chinese constellations
