= HD 169405 =

Star in the constellation Telescopium

- Location of HD 169405 (circled)

Observation data Epoch J2000 Equinox ICRS
- Constellation: Telescopium
- Right ascension: 18^{h} 26^{m} 54.01379^{s}
- Declination: −48° 07′ 02.0638″
- Apparent magnitude (V): +5.44

Characteristics
- Evolutionary stage: red giant branch
- Spectral type: K0.5III + F/G
- B−V color index: 0.855±0.004

Astrometry
Radial velocity (R_{v})	+2.11±3.42 km/s
Proper motion (μ)	RA: +3.041±0.182 mas/yr Dec.: −54.895±0.169 mas/yr
Parallax (π)	12.2045±0.2664 mas
Distance	267 ± 6 ly (82 ± 2 pc)
Absolute magnitude (M_{V})	1.14

Details
Mass	2.4 M_{☉}
Radius	9.8 R_{☉}
Luminosity	35 L_{☉}
Surface gravity (log g)	2.94 cgs
Temperature	5,062 K
Metallicity [Fe/H]	+0.04 dex
Rotational velocity (v sin i)	2.7±1.7 km/s
Age	557 Myr

Other designations
- CD−48°12505, GC 25150, HD 169405, HIP 90414, HR 6894, SAO 229021

Database references
SIMBAD	data

HD 169405 (HR 6894), is a suspected binary star system in the southern constellation Telescopium, about a degree to the north of Zeta Telescopii. It has an apparent magnitude of 5.44, making it faintly visible to the naked eye under ideal conditions. HD 169405 is located at a distance of 267 light years and is drifting away with a heliocentric radial velocity of 3.8 km/s.

The visible component has a spectral classification K0.5III which indicates that it is an evolved star between a K0 and K1 giant. It has expanded to ten times the Sun's radius, shines at 35 solar luminosities, and has an effective temperature of 5,062 K. This temperature gives it the yellowish-orange glow of a K-type star, and it spins slowly with a projected rotational velocity of 2.7 km/s.
