= NGC 6584 =

Globular cluster in the constellation Telescopium

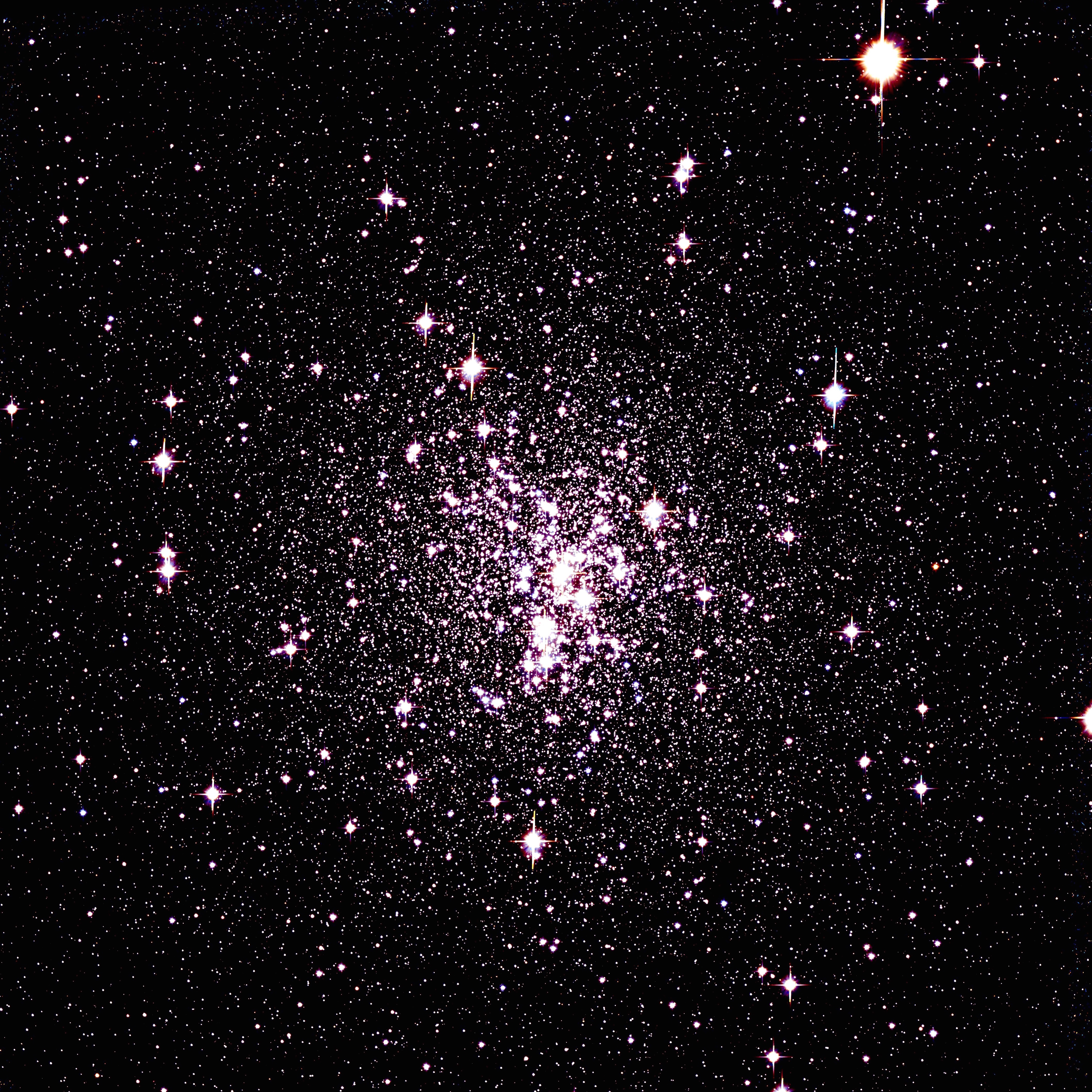

Observation data (J2000 epoch)
- Class: VIII
- Constellation: Telescopium
- Right ascension: 18^{h} 18^{m} 37.60^{s}
- Declination: –52° 12′ 56.8″
- Distance: 45000
- Apparent dimensions (V): 7.9'

Physical characteristics
- Metallicity: [Fe/H] = −1.53±0.08 dex
- Estimated age: 11.6±1.7 Gyr

NGC 6584 is a globular cluster in the constellation Telescopium that lies near Theta Arae and is 45000 light-years distant. It is an Oosterhoff type I cluster, and contains at least 69 variable stars, most of which are RR Lyrae variables: 46 stars were identified as RRab variables; 15 as RRc variables, 1 RRe variable, 4 eclipsing binaries and 3 long period variables. NGC 6584 is about 4 kpc from the Galactic Center and about 2.7 kpc from the Galactic plane.

As is typical for metal-poor globular clusters, NGC 6584 has an enhanced concentration of alpha elements relative to iron.
