= HD 181327 =

Star in the constellation Telescopium

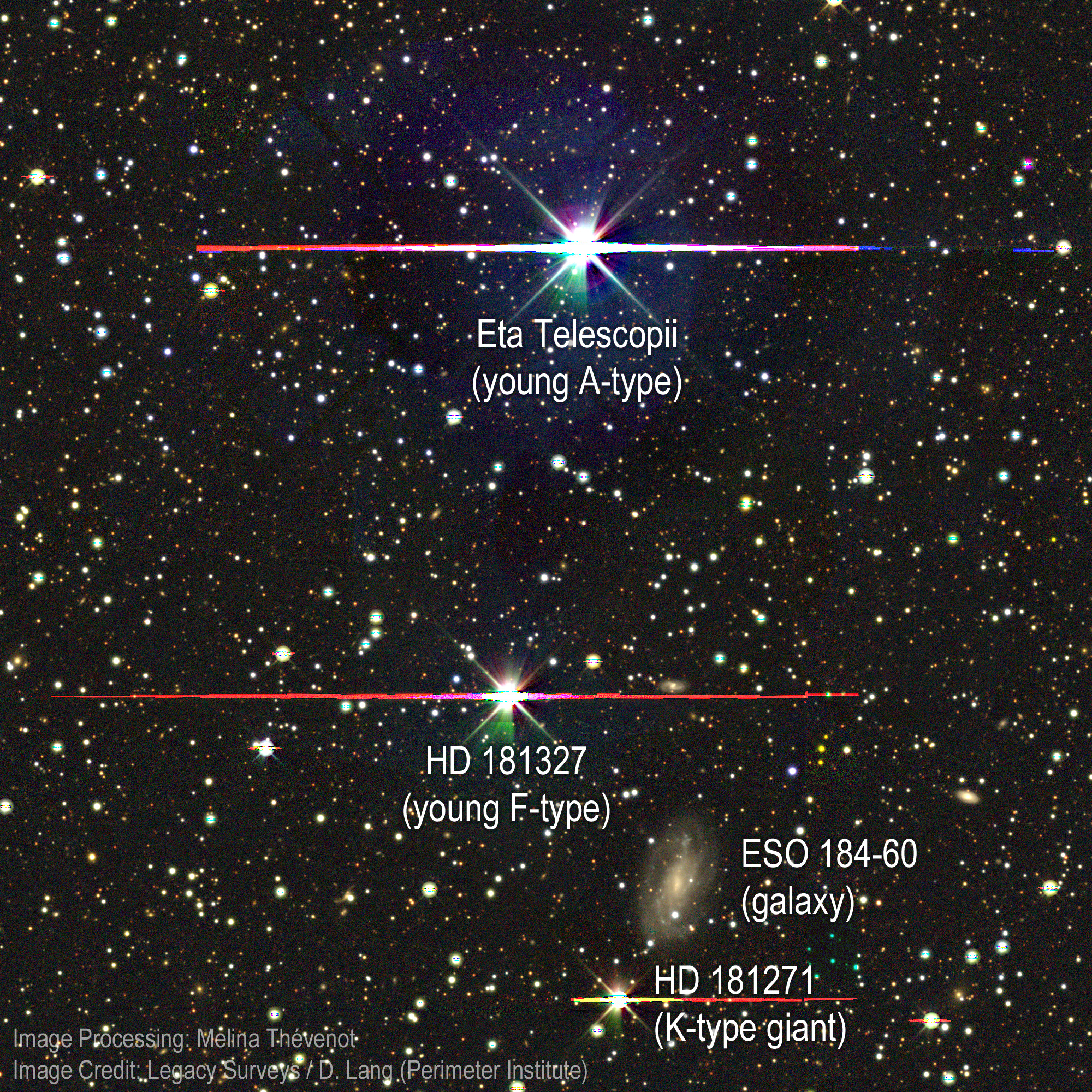
- Image of Eta Telescopii and HD 181327 with the legacy surveys

Observation data Epoch J2000 Equinox J2000
- Constellation: Telescopium
- Right ascension: 19^{h} 22^{m} 58.944^{s}
- Declination: −54° 32′ 16.98″
- Apparent magnitude (V): 7.04±0.01

Characteristics
- Evolutionary stage: main sequence
- Spectral type: F6V

Astrometry
Radial velocity (R_{v})	0.07±0.13 km/s
Proper motion (μ)	RA: +24.403±0.022 mas/yr Dec.: −82.186±0.016 mas/yr
Parallax (π)	20.9306±0.0286 mas
Distance	155.8 ± 0.2 ly (47.78 ± 0.07 pc)
Absolute magnitude (M_{V})	+3.47

Details
Mass	1.36±0.02 M_{☉}
Radius	1.32±0.01 R_{☉}
Luminosity	0.44±0.02 L_{☉}
Surface gravity (log g)	4.33±0.01 cgs
Temperature	6,498+56 −53 K
Metallicity [Fe/H]	0.05±0.06 dex
Rotation	1.542±0.048 d
Age	~18.5 Myr

Other designations
- HIP 95270, IRAS 19189−5438, CD−54 8270, 2MASS J19225894−5432170, TYC 8765-638-1, WISE J192258.97−543217.8, CPC 19 7662

Database references
SIMBAD	data

HD 181327 is a young F-type main-sequence star located 156 light years from Earth in the constellation of Telescopium. It is part of the Beta Pictoris Moving Group. HD 181327 is surrounded by a thin debris disk which is often called a Kuiper Belt analog because it is full of icy bodies colliding within the disk. Large amounts of water ice was detected in the debris disk of HD 181327 by using the James Webb Space Telescope.

The star co-moves with Eta Telescopii. No directly imaged exoplanets were detected in a search with the Very Large Telescope.

== Debris disk ==
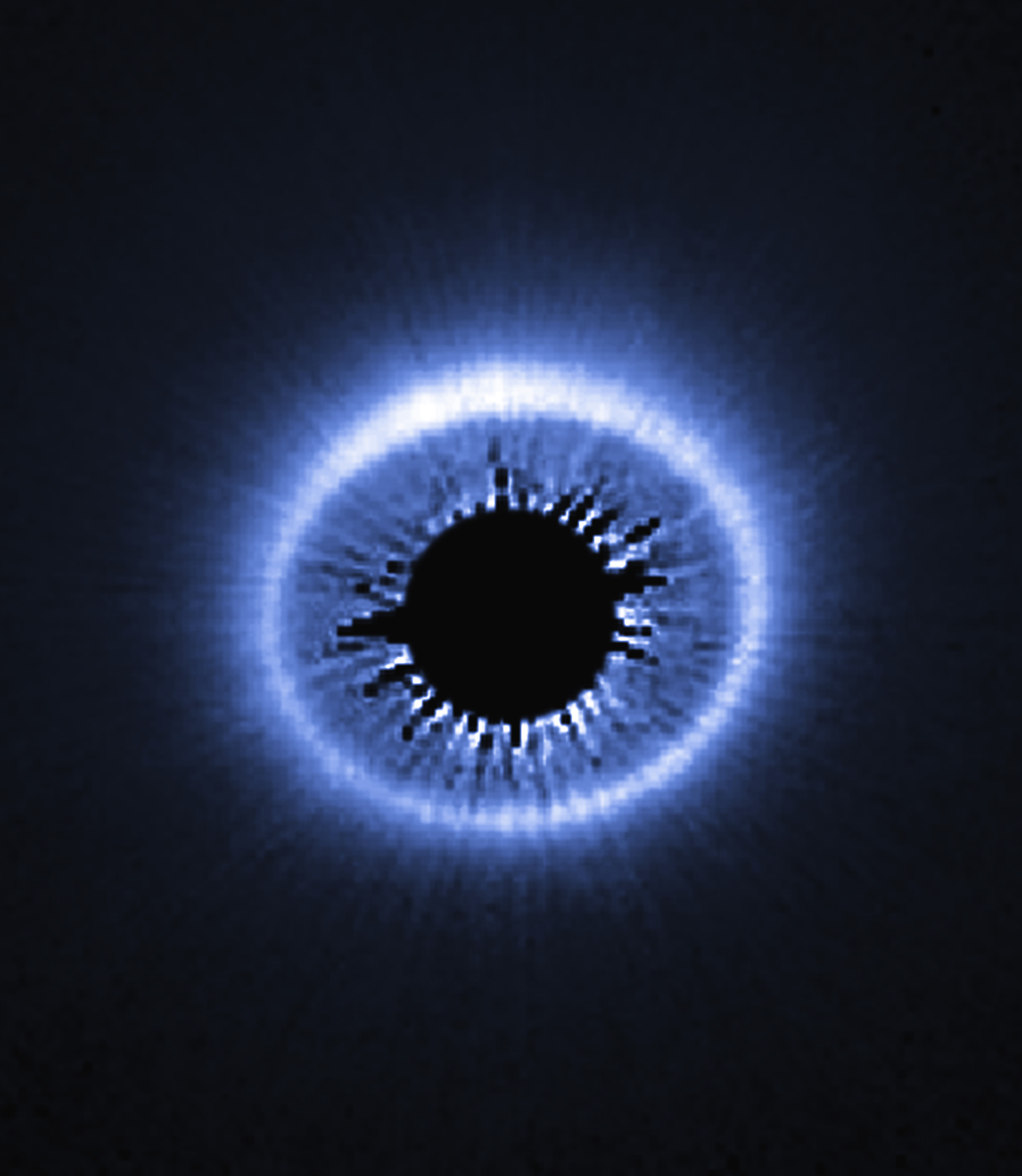
Hubble image of the disk around HD 181327. The image shows that the top part of the disk is brighter.

The debris disk was first directly imaged in 2006 with Hubble NICMOS as a debris ring, located 86 AU from the star. The debris ring around HD 181327 is often compared to the Kuiper belt. Observations with the ALMA observatory measured its size to be 23.2±1.0 AU and its dust mass to be 0.422±0.005 M_{🜨}. Observations with the Herschel Space Observatory and ATCA array showed that the debris ring contains micron-sized grains of porous amorphous silicates and carbonaceous material, with a layer of ice. The disk was observed with SPHERE in polarized light in the H-band. The observation require a more refracting component, such as iron-bearing minerals. The near-infrared polarization was described as strikingly similar to solar-system comets. JWST observations found crystalline water ice (H_{2}O), iron sulfide (FeS) and olivine (MgFeSiO_{4}) inside the debris ring.

=== Evidence for collisions ===
Asymmetry of the debris ring was first suspected from observations with Gemini. A better resolution image was taken with Hubble STIS, revealing asymmetries in the debris ring. The researchers suggest that either the ring experienced interactions with the interstellar medium, or that an object with >1% the mass of Pluto was catastrophically disrupted. Observations in 2008 with Spitzer hinted for the first time that the debris ring contains crystalline water ice, showing that the debris ring could be a Kuiper Belt analogue. The water ice has to be constantly replenished by collisions, because water ice has a lifetime of around only 1400 years, which is much shorter than the age of about 12 Million years of the system. The water ice detection was confirmed in 2025 with JWST NIRSpec. The water ice was detected with a 3.1 μm Fresnel peak that gets stronger with increasing distance from the star. At around 85 AU the water ice fraction is only 0.1% and at around 113 AU the water ice fraction increases to 13.9%. The observations also tentatively detected carbon dioxide ice (CO_{2}) at 105–120 AU. Observations with ALMA in 2016 showed carbon monoxide (CO) gas inside the dust ring. CO gas is commonly found in much younger protoplanetary disks, but in debris disks it should not be present and is sometimes seen as evidence for collisions of exocomets. This observation does find that the observed asymmetry is not by a giant collision, but instead by interstellar medium interaction or a large body releasing dust.

The HD 181327 planetary system
Companion (in order from star)	Mass	Semimajor axis (AU)	Orbital period (years)	Eccentricity	Inclination (°)	Radius
debris ring	74.4–97.6 AU				30.0±0.7°	—

== Gallery ==
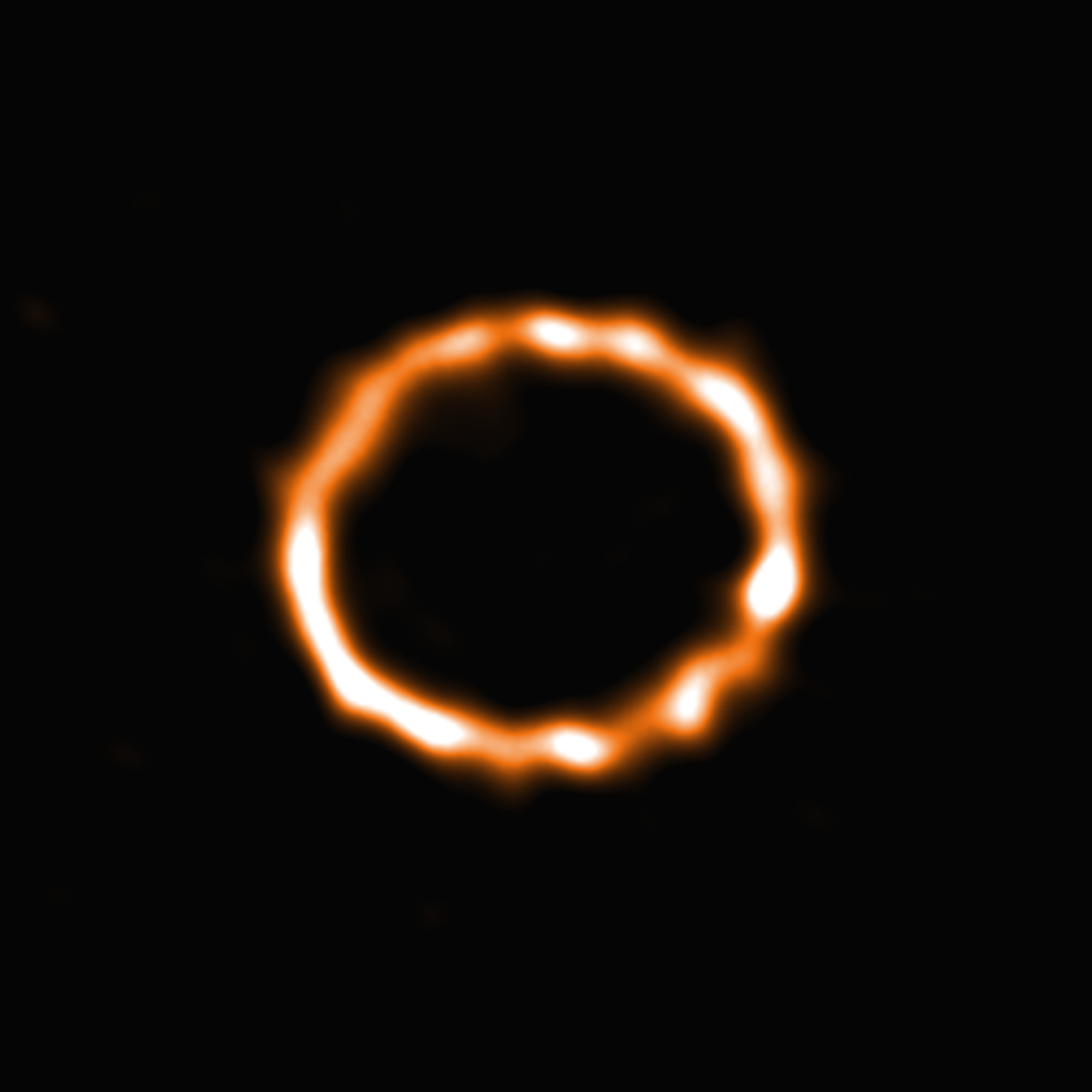
CO gas was detected inside the disk with ALMA.

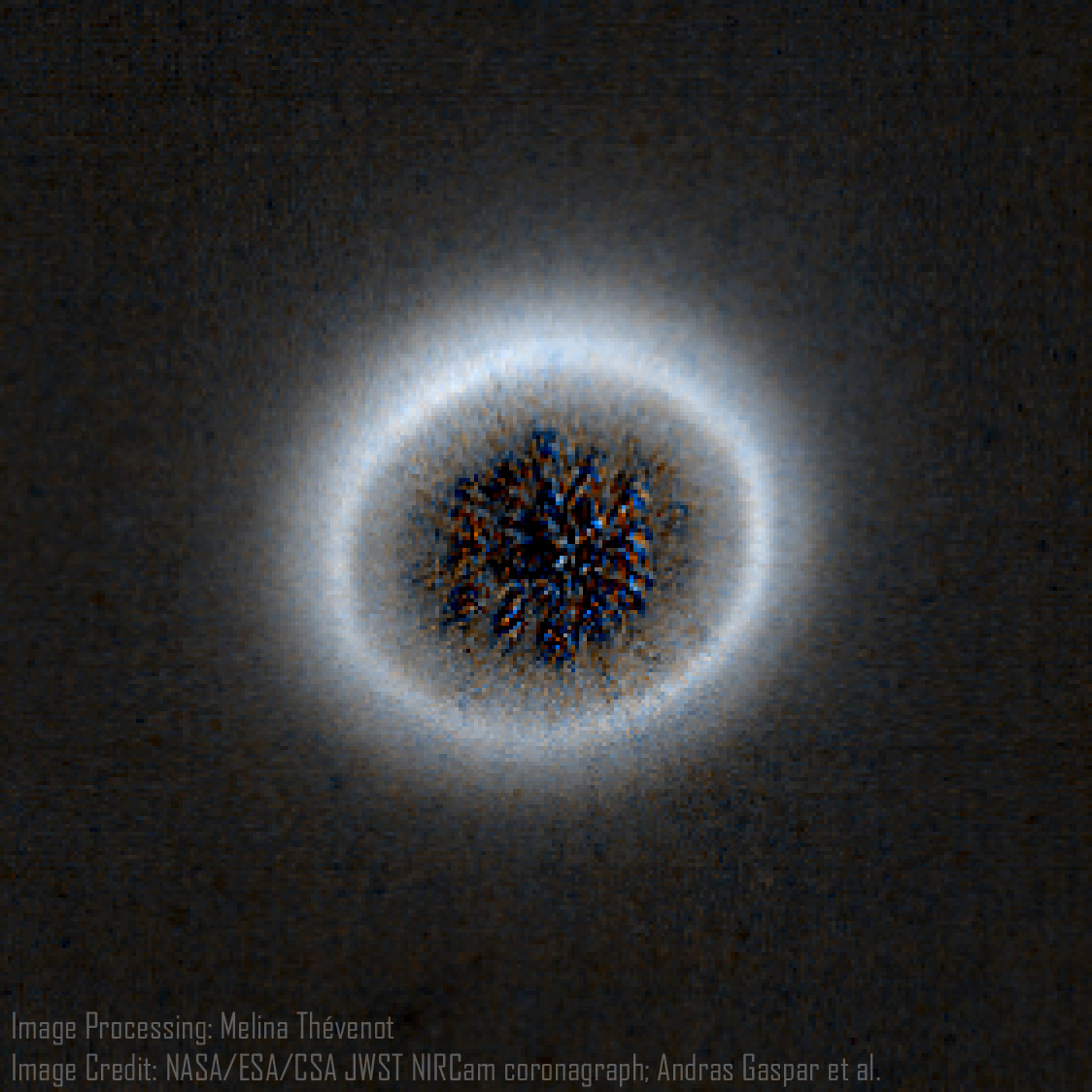
JWST NIRCam also directly imaged the disk.

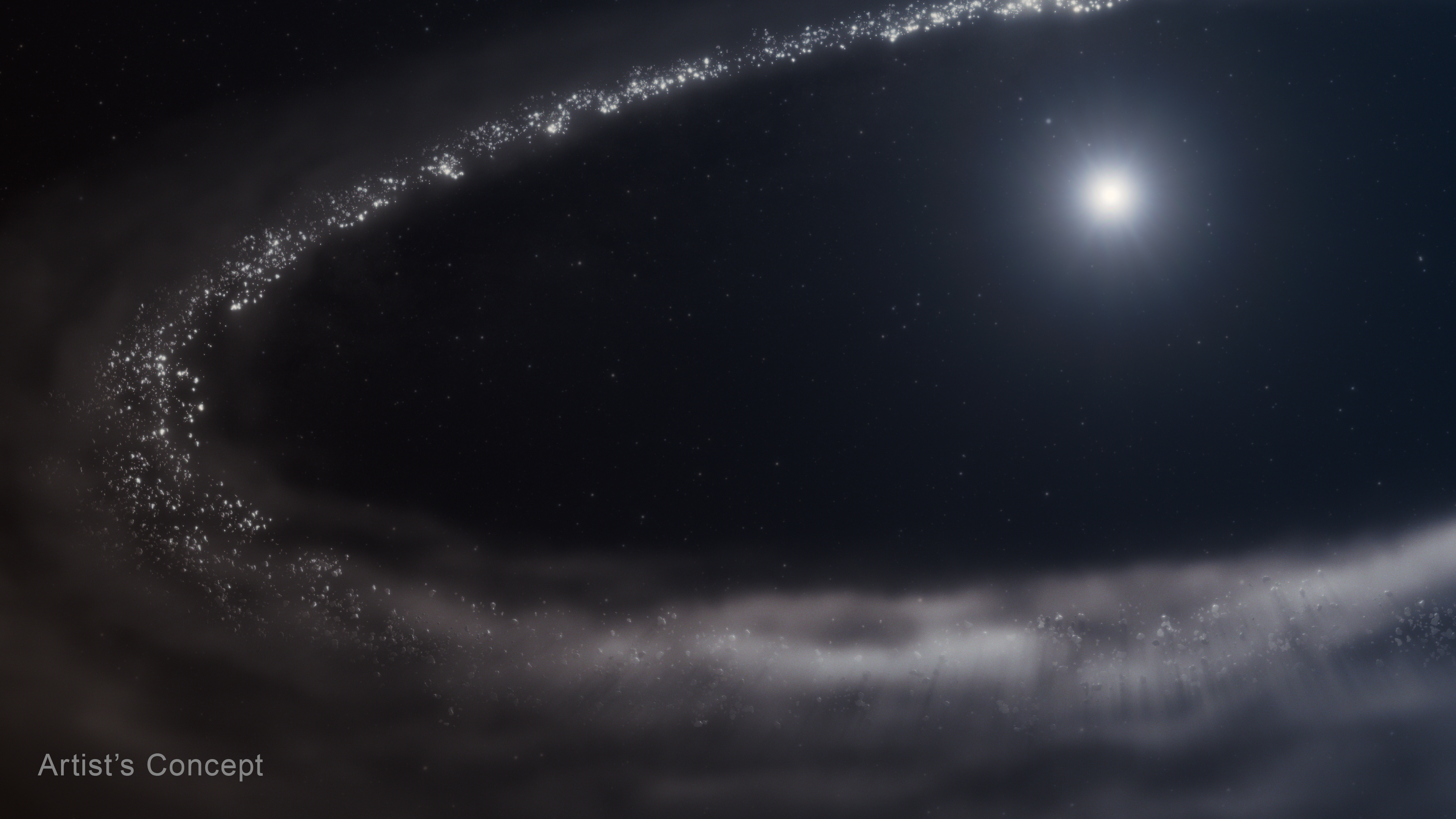
Artist's impression of the debris ring around HD 181327

== See also ==
- List of resolved circumstellar disks
- List of stars in Telescopium
