= Delta1 Telescopii =

Star in the constellation Telescopium

Delta^{1} Telescopii
Observation data Epoch J2000.0 Equinox J2000.0 (ICRS)
- Constellation: Telescopium
- Right ascension: 18^{h} 31^{m} 45.43288^{s}
- Declination: −45° 54′ 53.3166″
- Apparent magnitude (V): 4.94

Characteristics
- Evolutionary stage: subgiant
- Spectral type: B6 IV
- U−B color index: −0.438
- B−V color index: −0.121

Astrometry
Proper motion (μ)	RA: −3.75 mas/yr Dec.: −27.43 mas/yr
Parallax (π)	4.61±0.19 mas
Distance	710 ± 30 ly (217 ± 9 pc)
Absolute magnitude (M_{V})	−0.74

Orbit
Period (P)	18.8456 d
Eccentricity (e)	0.51
Periastron epoch (T)	2435003.693 JD
Argument of periastron (ω) (secondary)	78°
Semi-amplitude (K_{1}) (primary)	65.0 km/s

Details

δ^{1} Tel A
Mass	4.52±0.06 M_{☉}
Radius	4.7 R_{☉}
Luminosity	899 L_{☉}
Temperature	12,417 K
Rotational velocity (v sin i)	11 km/s
Age	178 Myr

Other designations
- δ^{1} Tel, CD−45°12550, HD 170465, HIP 90830, HR 6934, SAO 229092

Database references
SIMBAD	data

Delta^{1} Telescopii is a blue-white-hued binary star system in the southern constellation of Telescopium. It is faintly visible to the naked eye, having an apparent visual magnitude of 4.94. Based upon an annual parallax shift of 4.61 mas as seen from Earth, this system is roughly 710 light-years from the Sun. At that distance, the visual magnitude is diminished by an extinction factor of 0.29 due to interstellar dust.

This system is a single-lined spectroscopic binary with an orbital period of 18.8 days and an eccentricity of 0.51. The estimated size of the semimajor axis has a minimum of 14.5×10^{6} km, with the uncertainty due to lack of a value for the orbital inclination. The primary, component A, has a stellar classification of B6 IV, suggesting it is an evolving B-type subgiant star. Delta^{1} Telescopii has an estimated 4.5 times the mass of the Sun and about 4.7 times the Sun's radius. It is radiating 899 times the solar luminosity from its photosphere at an effective temperature of 12,417 K.
