= Nu Telescopii =

High proper motion star

ν Telescopii
- Location of ν Telescopii (circled)

Observation data Epoch J2000.0 Equinox J2000.0 (ICRS)
- Constellation: Telescopium
- Right ascension: 19^{h} 48^{m} 01.1977^{s}
- Declination: −56° 21′ 45.397″
- Apparent magnitude (V): 5.33±0.01

Characteristics
- Evolutionary stage: main sequence
- Spectral type: A7 III/IV
- B−V color index: +0.20

Astrometry
Radial velocity (R_{v})	−12.4±4.2 km/s
Proper motion (μ)	RA: +90.983 mas/yr Dec.: −137.406 mas/yr
Parallax (π)	19.3152±0.0783 mas
Distance	168.9 ± 0.7 ly (51.8 ± 0.2 pc)
Absolute magnitude (M_{V})	+1.86

Details
Mass	1.85 M_{☉}
Radius	1.94±0.09 R_{☉}
Luminosity	15.6±0.1 L_{☉}
Surface gravity (log g)	4.08^{+0.08}_{−0.07} cgs
Temperature	8,199±279 K
Metallicity [Fe/H]	−0.02 dex
Age	686 Myr

Other designations
- ν Tel, 67 G. Telescopii, CPD−56°9290, FK5 739, HD 186543, HIP 97421, HR 7510, SAO 246271

Database references
SIMBAD	data

Nu Telescopii, Latinized from ν Telescopii, is a slightly evolved star in the southern constellation Telescopium. It has an apparent visual magnitude of 5.33, meaning it is faintly visible to the naked eye. The object is relatively close to Earth, at a distance of 169 light years, and is approaching the Solar System with a heliocentric radial velocity of about −12 km/s.

Astronomers disagree about Nu Telescopii's spectral classification. It was initially categorized as Am star, with a classification of kA4mF3IV:. This indicates that the object has the calcium K-lines of an A4 star and the metallic lines of a F3 subgiant. However, Nu Telescopii was subsequently shown not to have a peculiar spectrum and was given a class of A9 Vn, indicating that it is an A-type main-sequence star displaying broad (nebulous) absorption lines due to its rapid rotation. It has since been classified as an evolved A7 star with either a blended luminosity class of a giant star or subgiant (III/IV), or only subgiant (IV).

Nu Telescopii has a mass of 1.85 M_{☉} and an age of 686 million years. Its radius is 1.94 times that of the Sun and has an effective temperature of 8,199 K. These parameters yield a luminosity of 15.6 L_{☉} from its photosphere which, when viewed, has a white hue. Nu Telescopii's metallicity is around that of the sun. Its motion in space matches that of the IC 2391 cluster, making it a probable member.

Nu Telescopii has a faint, magnitude 9.3 companion star at an angular separation of 102 arc seconds along a position angle of 333°, as of 2010.
