= RS Telescopii =

Star in the constellation Telescopium

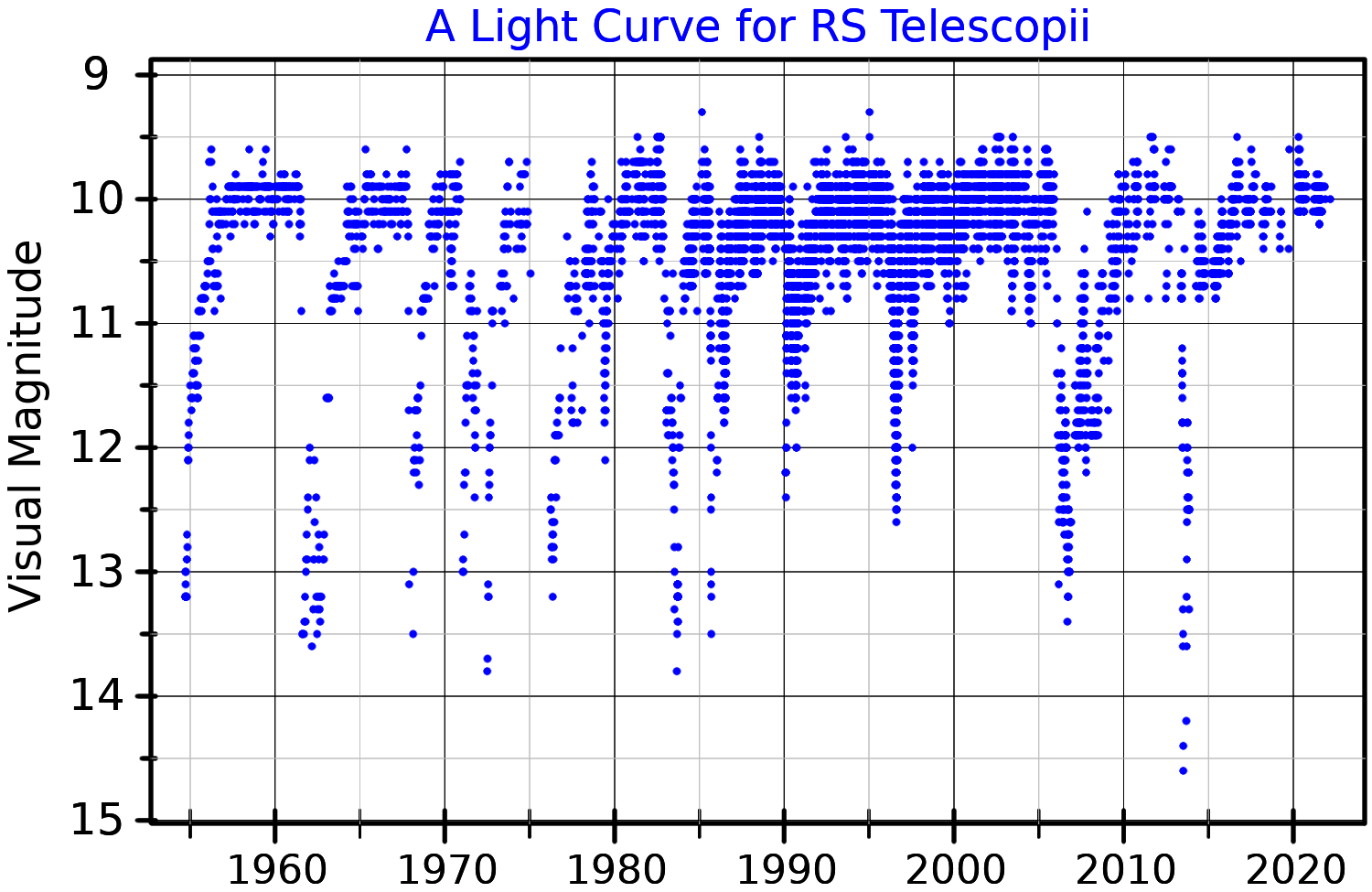
- A visual band light curve for RS Telescopii, plotted from AAVSO data

Observation data Epoch J2000.0 Equinox J2000.0
- Constellation: Telescopium
- Right ascension: 18^{h} 18^{m} 51.2224^{s}
- Declination: −46° 32′ 53.427″
- Apparent magnitude (V): 10.67

Characteristics
- Spectral type: R0
- B−V color index: 2.100±0.510
- Variable type: R CrB

Astrometry
Radial velocity (R_{v})	−3.0 km/s
Proper motion (μ)	RA: −2.730 mas/yr Dec.: −6.670 mas/yr
Parallax (π)	0.1732±0.0166 mas
Distance	19,000 ± 2,000 ly (5,800 ± 600 pc)

Details
Radius	73 R_{☉}
Luminosity	288 (at max) L_{☉}
Surface gravity (log g)	1.0 cgs
Temperature	5,800 K

Other designations
- RS Tel, CD−46°12279, HIP 89739

Database references
SIMBAD	data

RS Telescopii, abbreviated RS Tel, is a variable star in the southern constellation of Telescopium. It is a dim star with an apparent visual magnitude of 10.67, which is much too faint to be visible without a telescope. The variability of this star was discovered by Evelyn F. Leland and announced by Edward C. Pickering in 1910. It was first studied by Cecilia H. Payne in 1928 at the Harvard College Observatory.

This is an R-type carbon star with a class of R0. RS Tel is a typical R Coronae Borealis variable—an extremely hydrogen-deficient supergiant thought to have arisen as the result of the merger of two white dwarfs; fewer than 100 have been discovered as of 2012. It has under 55% the mass of the Sun and an effective temperature of around 5,800 K. The spectrum of the star shows anomalously weak lines of hydrogen, with strong lines of C_{2}, CN, and neutral carbon.

RS Tel has a maximum magnitude of 9.6 and a minimum magnitude 16.5. The star undergoes large, random variations in brightness on a time scale of thousands of days with no apparent periodicity. The star is surrounded by a circumstellar shell of dust which radiating an infrared excess.
