= Telescopium =

Constellation in the southern celestial hemisphere

- Constellation
- List of stars in Telescopium
- Abbreviation: Tel
- Genitive: Telescopii
- Pronunciation: /ˌtɛlɪˈskoʊpiəm/, genitive /ˌtɛlɪˈskoʊpi.aɪ/
- Symbolism: the Telescope
- Right ascension: 19^{h}
- Declination: −50°
- Quadrant: SQ4
- Area: 252 sq. deg. (57th)
- Main stars: 2
- Bayer/Flamsteed stars: 13
- Stars brighter than 3.00^{m}: 0
- Stars within 10.00 pc (32.62 ly): 2
- Brightest star: α Tel (3.49^{m})
- Nearest star: Gliese 754
- Messier objects: 0
- Bordering constellations: Ara; Corona Australis; Indus; Microscopium (corner); Pavo; Sagittarius
- Visible at latitudes between +40° and −90°. Best visible at 21:00 (9 p.m.) during the month of August.

Telescopium is a minor constellation in the southern celestial hemisphere, one of twelve named in the 18th century by French astronomer Nicolas-Louis de Lacaille and one of several depicting scientific instruments. Its name is a Latinized form of the Greek word for telescope. Telescopium was later much reduced in size by Francis Baily and Benjamin Gould.

The brightest star in the constellation is Alpha Telescopii, a blue-white subgiant with an apparent magnitude of 3.5, followed by the orange giant star Zeta Telescopii at magnitude 4.1. Eta and PZ Telescopii are two young star systems with debris disks and brown dwarf companions. Telescopium hosts two unusual stars with very little hydrogen that are likely to be the result of two merged white dwarfs: PV Telescopii, also known as HD 168476, is a hot blue extreme helium star, while RS Telescopii is an R Coronae Borealis variable. RR Telescopii is a cataclysmic variable that brightened as a nova to magnitude 6 in 1948.

It had been hypothesized in 2020 that Telescopium would also host the first known visible star system with a black hole, QV Telescopii (HR 6819), however observations in 2022 indicated that this is a binary system of two main-sequence stars without a black hole instead.

== History ==
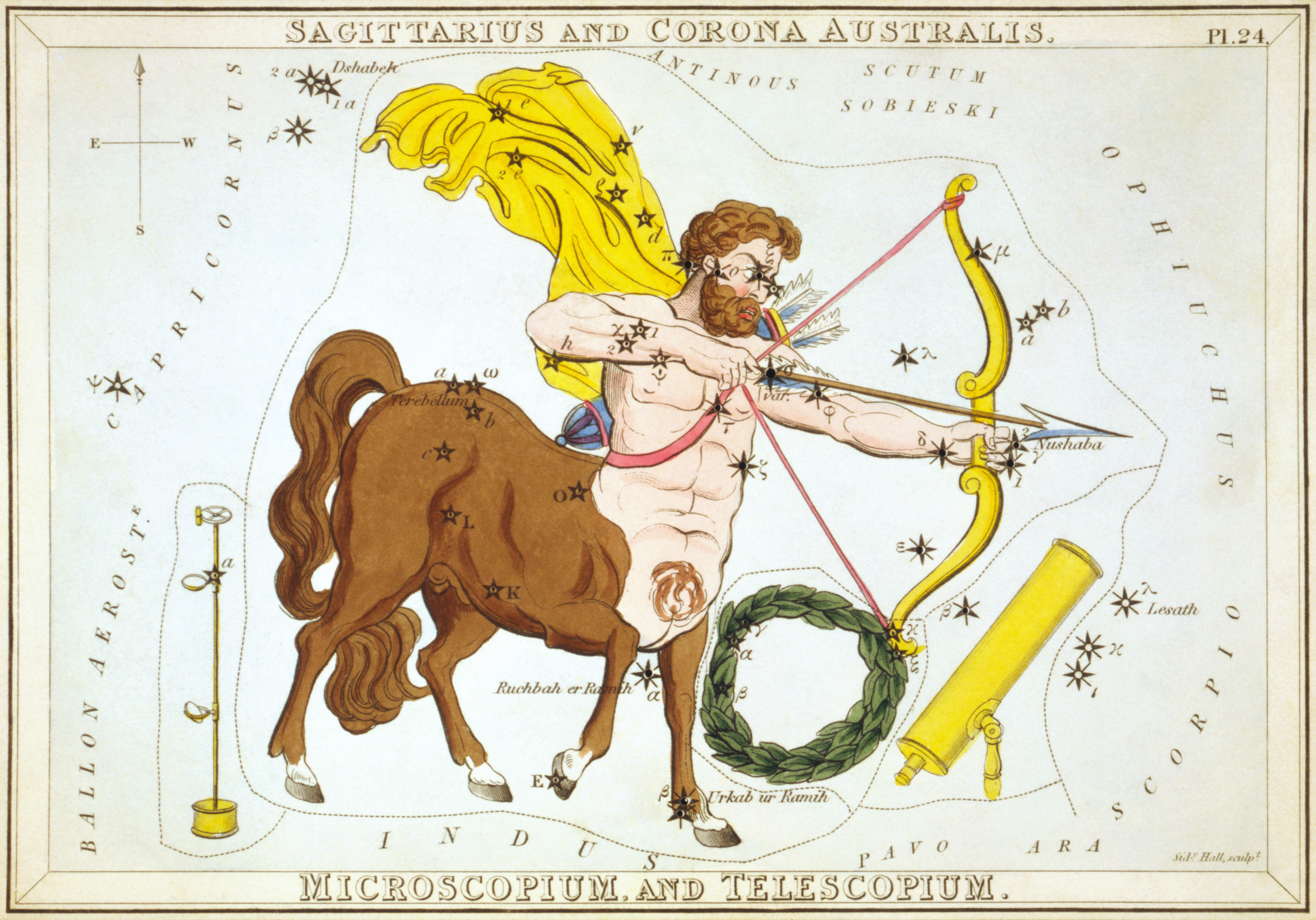
Seen in the 1824 star chart set Urania's Mirror (in the lower right)

Telescopium was introduced in 1751–52 by Nicolas-Louis de Lacaille with the French name le Telescope, depicting an aerial telescope, after he had observed and catalogued 10,000 southern stars during a two-year stay at the Cape of Good Hope. He devised 14 new constellations in uncharted regions of the Southern Celestial Hemisphere not visible from Europe. All but one honored instruments that symbolised the Age of Enlightenment. Covering 40 degrees of the night sky, the telescope stretched out northwards between Sagittarius and Scorpius. Lacaille had Latinised its name to Telescopium by 1763.

The constellation was known by other names. It was called Tubus Astronomicus in the eighteenth century, during which time three constellations depicting telescopes were recognised—Tubus Herschelii Major between Gemini and Auriga and Tubus Herschelii Minor between Taurus and Orion, both of which had fallen out of use by the nineteenth century. Johann Bode called it the Astronomische Fernrohr in his 1805 Gestirne and kept its size, but later astronomers Francis Baily and Benjamin Gould subsequently shrank its boundaries. The much-reduced constellation lost several brighter stars to neighbouring constellations: Beta Telescopii became Eta Sagittarii, which it had been before Lacaille placed it in Telescopium, Gamma was placed in Scorpius and renamed G Scorpii by Gould, Theta Telescopii reverted to its old appellation of d Ophiuchi, and Sigma Telescopii was placed in Corona Australis. Initially uncatalogued, the latter is now known as HR 6875. The original object Lacaille had named Eta Telescopii—the open cluster Messier 7—was in what is now Scorpius, and Gould used the Bayer designation for a magnitude 5 star, which he felt warranted a letter.

== Characteristics ==
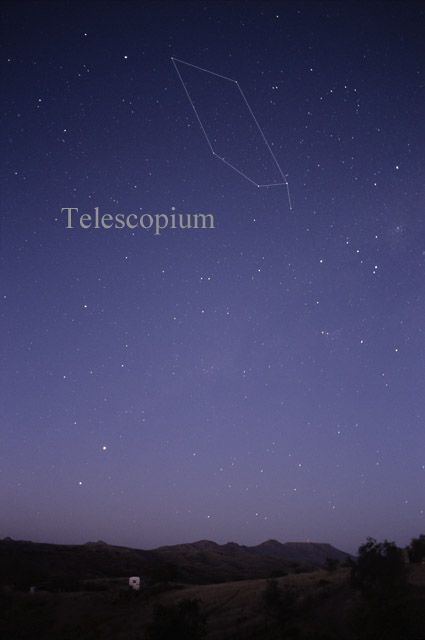
The constellation of Telescopium, the telescope, as it can be seen by the naked eye

A small constellation, Telescopium is bordered by Sagittarius and Corona Australis to the north, Ara to the west, Pavo to the south, and Indus to the east, cornering on Microscopium to the northeast. The three-letter abbreviation for the constellation, as adopted by the International Astronomical Union in 1922, is "Tel". The official constellation boundaries, as set by Belgian astronomer Eugène Delporte in 1930, are defined by a quadrilateral. In the equatorial coordinate system, the right ascension coordinates of these borders lie between 18^{h} 09.1^{m} and 20^{h} 29.5^{m} , while the declination coordinates are between −45.09° and −56.98°. The whole constellation is visible to observers south of latitude 33°N. (Note: While parts of the constellation technically rise above the horizon to observers between 33°N and 44°N, stars within a few degrees of the horizon are to all intents and purposes unobservable.)

== Features ==
=== Stars ===
Within the constellation's borders, there are 57 stars brighter than or equal to apparent magnitude 6.5. (Note: Objects of magnitude 6.5 are among the faintest visible to the unaided eye in suburban-rural transition night skies.) With a magnitude of 3.5, Alpha Telescopii is the brightest star in the constellation. It is a blue-white subgiant of spectral type B3IV which lies around 250 light-years away. It is radiating nearly 800 times the Sun's luminosity, and is estimated to be 5.2±0.4 times as massive and have 3.3±0.5 times the Sun's radius. Close by Alpha Telescopii are the two blue-white stars sharing the designation of Delta Telescopii. Delta¹ Telescopii is of spectral type B6IV and apparent magnitude 4.9, while Delta² Telescopii is of spectral type B3III and magnitude 5.1. They form an optical double, as the stars are estimated to be around 710 and 1190 light-years away respectively. The faint (magnitude 12.23) Gliese 754, a red dwarf of spectral type M4.5V, is one of the nearest 100 stars to Earth at 19.3 light-years distant. Its eccentric orbit around the Galaxy indicates that it may have originated in the Milky Way's thick disk.

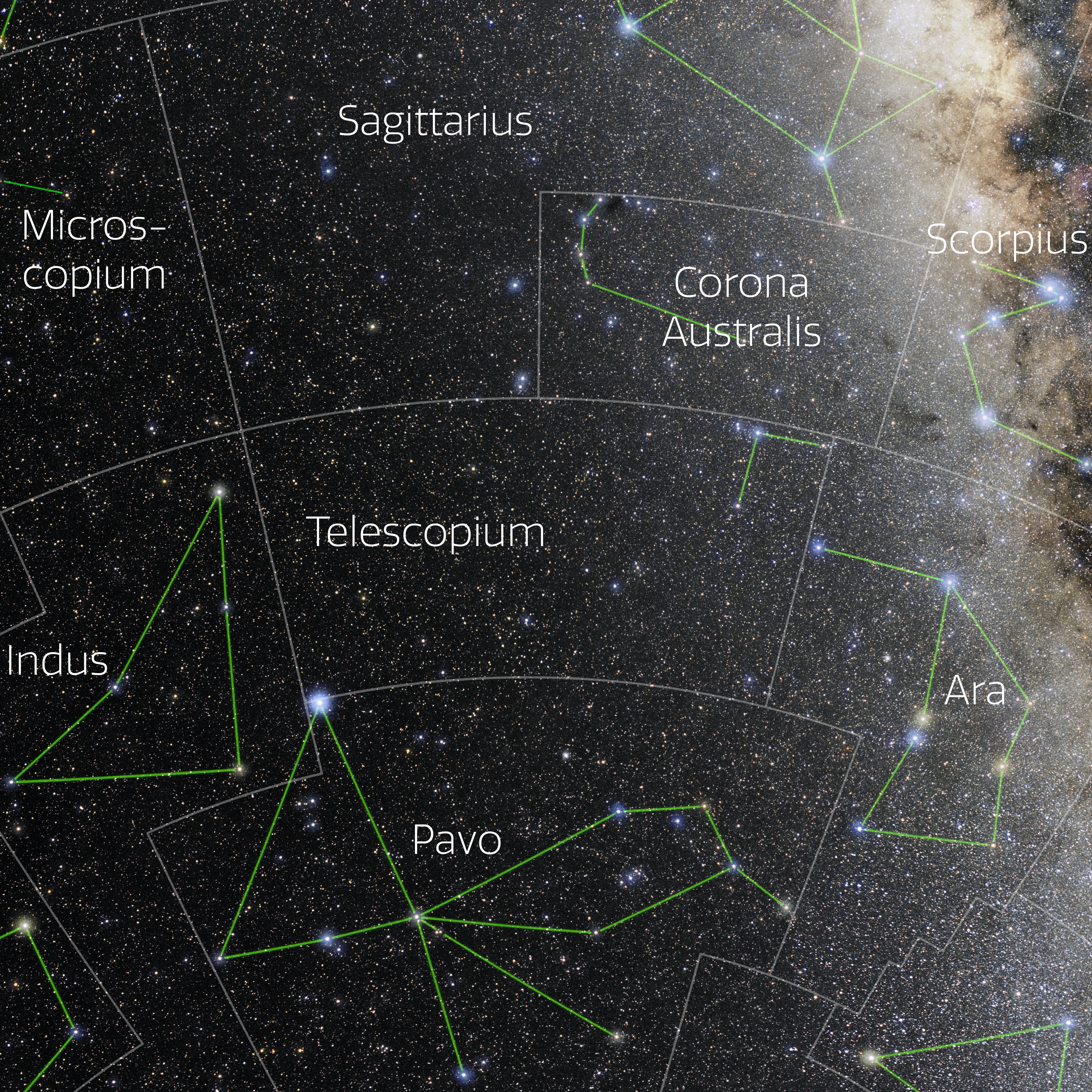
The constellation Telescopium showing the IAU boundaries, the constellation stick figure, and labels for its brightest stars. Astrophotograph by Eckhard Slawik, from NOIRLab's 88 Constellations project.

At least four of the fifteen stars visible to the unaided eye are orange giants of spectral class K. The second brightest star in the constellation—at apparent magnitude 4.1—is Zeta Telescopii, an orange subgiant of spectral type K1III-IV. Around 1.53 times as massive as the Sun, it shines with 512 times its luminosity. Located 127 light years away from Earth, it has been described as yellow or reddish in appearance. Epsilon Telescopii is a binary star system: the brighter component, Epsilon Telescopii A, is an orange giant of spectral type K0III with an apparent magnitude of +4.52, while the 13th magnitude companion, Epsilon Telescopii B, is 21 arcseconds away from the primary, and just visible with a 15 cm aperture telescope on a dark night. The system is 417 light-years away. Iota Telescopii and HD 169405—magnitude 5 orange giants of spectral types K0III and K0.5III respectively—make up the quartet. They are around 370 and 497 light-years away from the Sun respectively. Another ageing star, Kappa Telescopii is a yellow giant with a spectral type G9III and apparent magnitude of 5.18. Around 1.87 billion years old, this star of around 1.6 solar masses has swollen to 11 times the Sun's diameter. It is approximately 293 light-years from Earth, and is another optical double.

Xi Telescopii is an irregular variable star that ranges between magnitudes 4.89 and 4.94. Located 1079 light-years distant, it is a red giant of spectral type M2III that has a diameter around 5.6 times the Sun's, and a luminosity around 2973 times that of the Sun. Another irregular variable, RX Telescopii is a red supergiant that varies between magnitudes 6.45 and 7.47, just visible to the unaided eye under good viewing conditions. BL Telescopii is an Algol-like eclipsing binary system that varies between apparent magnitudes 7.09 and 9.08 over a period of just over 778 days (2 years 48 days). The primary is a yellow supergiant that is itself intrinsically variable. Dipping from its baseline magnitude of 9.6 to 16.5, RS Telescopii is a rare R Coronae Borealis variable—an extremely hydrogen-deficient supergiant thought to have arisen as the result of the merger of two white dwarfs; fewer than 100 have been discovered as of 2012. The dimming is thought to be caused by carbon dust expelled by the star. As of 2012, four dimmings have been observed. PV Telescopii is a class B-type (blue) extreme helium star that is the prototype of a class of variables known as PV Telescopii variables. First discovered in 1952, it was found to have a very low level of hydrogen. One theory of its origin is that it is the result of a merger between a helium- and a carbon-oxygen white dwarf. If the combined mass does not exceed the Chandrasekhar limit, the former will accrete onto the latter star and ignite to form a supergiant. Later this will become an extreme helium star before cooling to become a white dwarf.

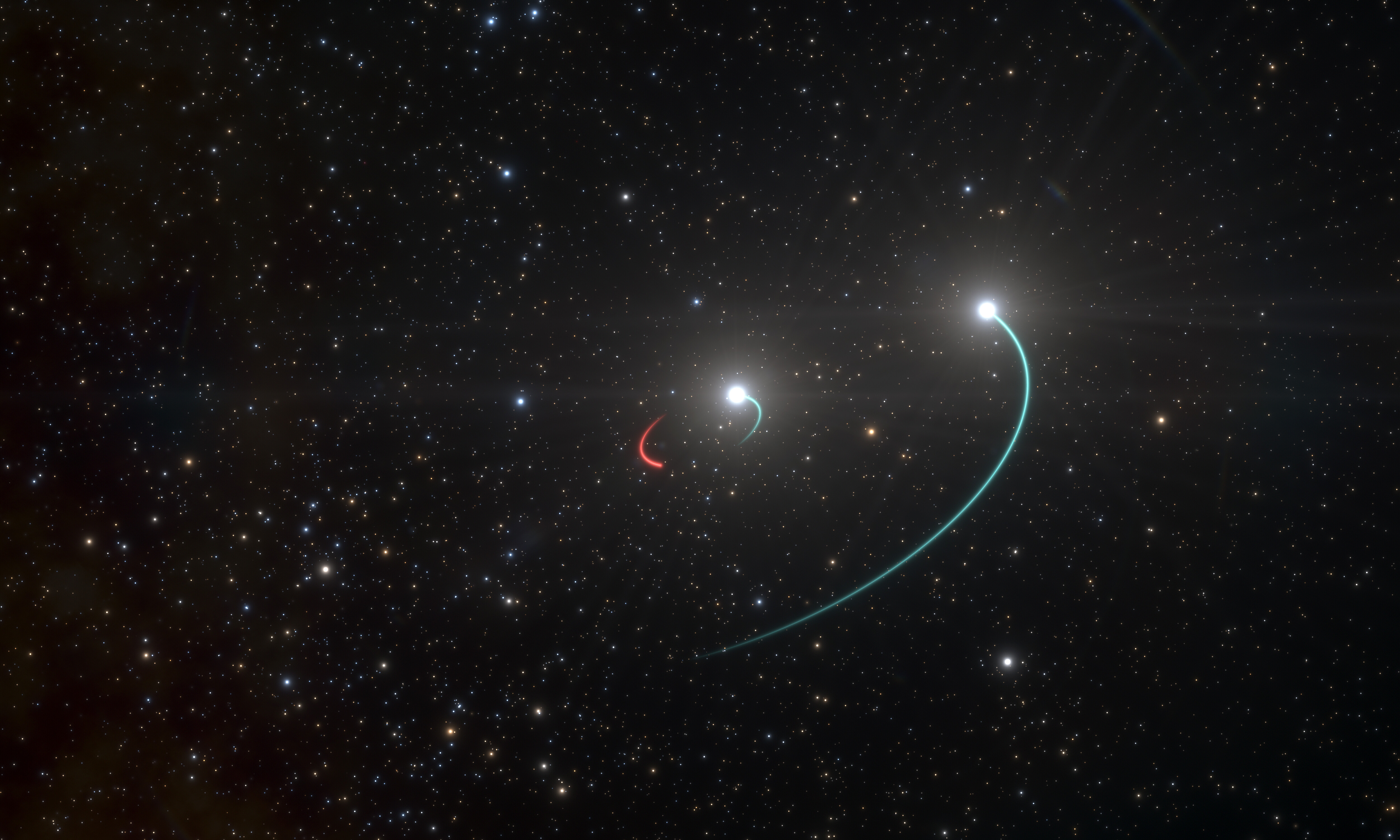
An artist's depiction of the orbits of the hierarchical triple star system HR 6819, with the inferred black hole (red orbit) in the inner binary

While RR Telescopii, also designated Nova Telescopii 1948, is often called a slow nova, it is now classified as a symbiotic nova system composed of an M5III pulsating red giant and a white dwarf; between 1944 and 1948 it brightened by about 7 magnitudes before being noticed at apparent magnitude 6.0 in mid-1948. It has since faded slowly to about apparent magnitude 12. QS Telescopii is a binary system composed of a white dwarf and main sequence donor star, in this case the two are close enough to be tidally locked, facing one another. Known as polars, material from the donor star does not form an accretion disk around the white dwarf, but rather streams directly onto it. This is due to the presence of the white dwarf's strong magnetic field.

Although no star systems in Telescopium have confirmed planets, several have been found to have brown dwarf companions. A member of the 12-million-year-old Beta Pictoris moving group of stars that share a common proper motion through space, Eta Telescopii is a young white main sequence star of magnitude 5.0 and spectral type A0V. It has a debris disk and brown dwarf companion of spectral type M7V or M8V that is between 20 and 50 times as massive as Jupiter. The system is complex, as it has a common proper motion with (and is gravitationally bound to) the star HD 181327, which has its own debris disk. This latter star is a yellow-white main sequence star of spectral type F6V of magnitude 7.0. PZ Telescopii is another young star with a debris disk and substellar brown dwarf companion, though at 24 million years of age appears too old to be part of the Beta Pictoris moving group. HD 191760 is a yellow subgiant—a star that is cooling and expanding off the main sequence—of spectral type G3IV/V. Estimated to be just over four billion years old, it is slightly (1.1 to 1.3 times) more massive as the Sun, 2.69 times as luminous, and has around 1.62 times its radius. Using the High Accuracy Radial Velocity Planet Searcher (HARPS) instrument on the ESO 3.6 m Telescope, it was found to have a brown dwarf around 38 times as massive as Jupiter orbiting at an average distance of 1.35 AU with a period of 505 days. This is an unusually close distance from the star, within a range that has been termed the brown-dwarf desert.

=== Deep-sky objects ===
The Telescopium group is a group of twelve galaxies spanning three degrees in the northeastern part of the constellation, lying around 37 megaparsecs (120 million light-years) from our own galaxy. The brightest member is the elliptical galaxy NGC 6868, and to the west lies the spiral galaxy (or, perhaps, lenticular galaxy) NGC 6861. These are the brightest members of two respective subgroups within the galaxy group, and are heading toward a merger in the future.

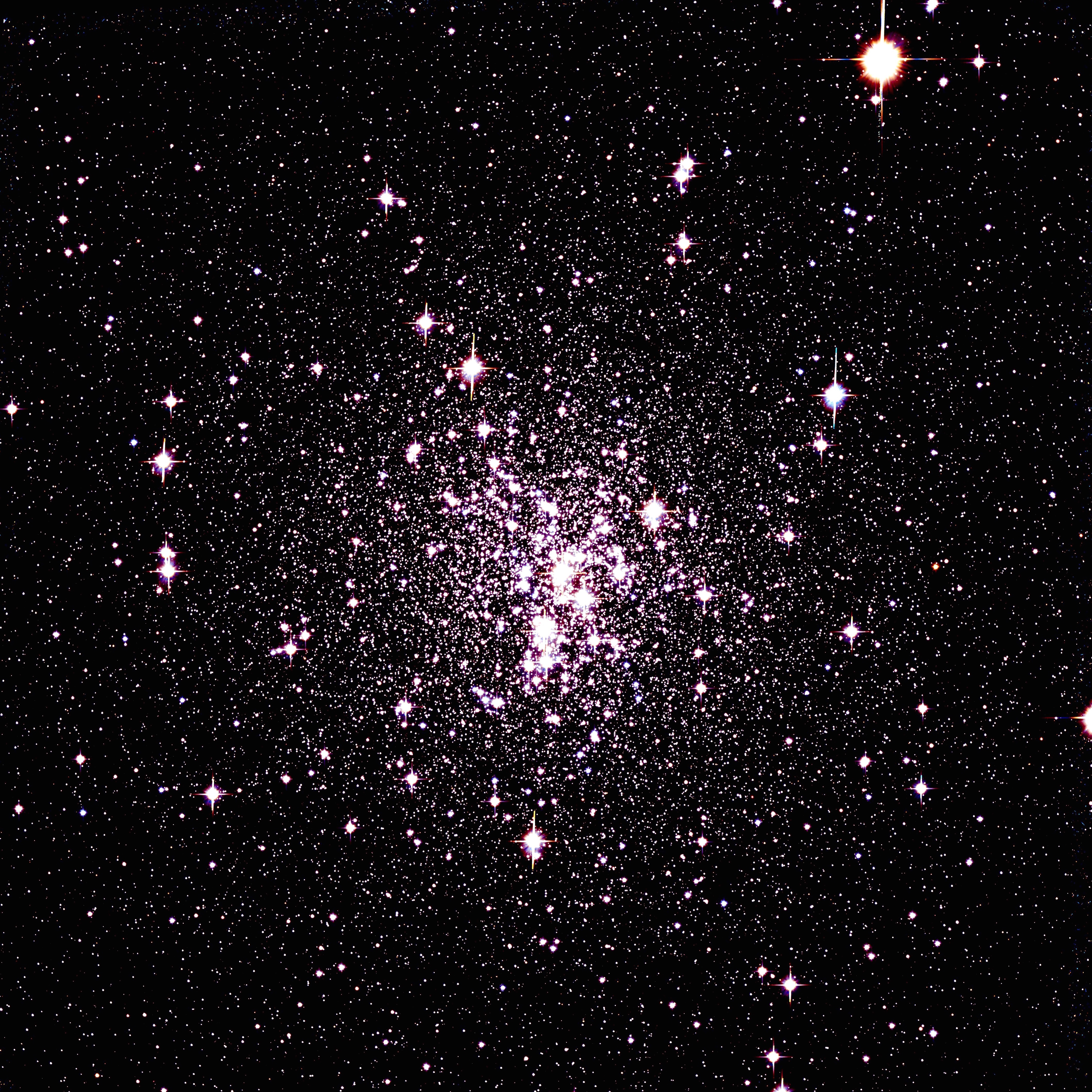
The globular cluster NGC 6584, as observed with the Hubble Space Telescope

The globular cluster NGC 6584 lies near Theta Arae and is 45,000 light-years distant from Earth. It is an Oosterhoff type I cluster, and contains at least 69 variable stars, most of which are RR Lyrae variables. The planetary nebula IC 4699 is of 13th magnitude and lies midway between Alpha and Epsilon Telescopii. IC 4889 is an elliptical galaxy of apparent magnitude 11.3, which can be found 2 degrees north-north-west of 5.3-magnitude Nu Telescopii. Observing it through a 40 cm telescope will reveal its central region and halo.

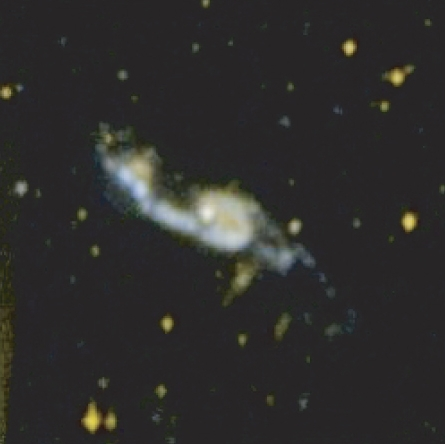
The interacting galaxy system NGC 6845, as observed with GALEX

Occupying an area of around 4' × 2', NGC 6845 is an interacting system of four galaxies—two spiral and two lenticular galaxies—that is estimated to be around 88 megaparsecs (287 million light-years) distant. SN 2008da was a type II supernova observed in one of the spiral galaxies, NGC 6845A, in June 2008. SN 1998bw was a luminous supernova observed in the spiral arm of the galaxy ESO184-G82 in April 1998, and is notable in that it is highly likely to be the source of the gamma-ray burst GRB 980425. (Note: chances of signals being unrelated is around 1 in 10,000.)

== See also ==
- Telescopium (Chinese astronomy)
- Telescopium Herschelii
