= Eta Telescopii =

Star in the constellation Telescopium

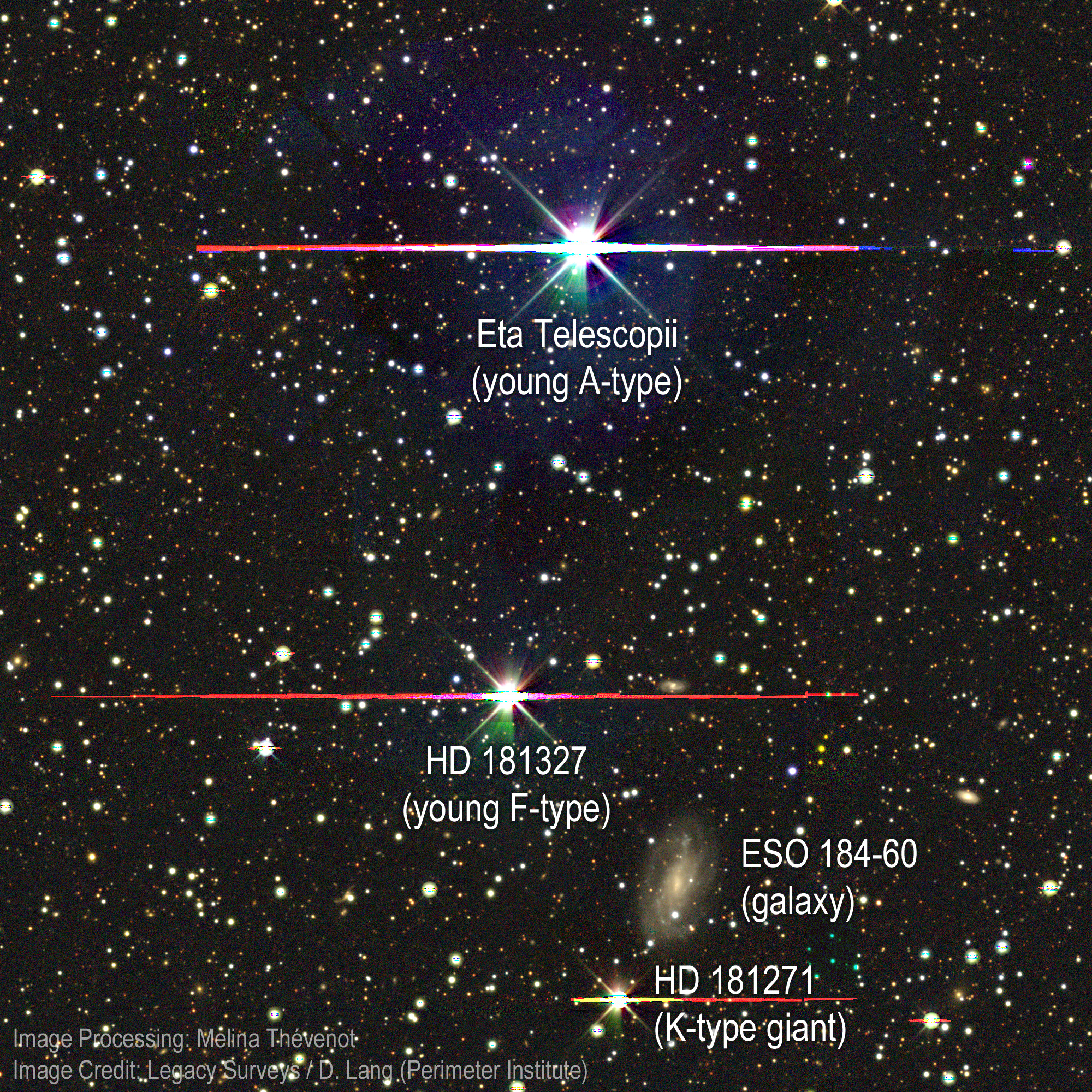
- Eta Telescopii and HD 181327 with the legacy surveys

Observation data Epoch J2000.0 Equinox J2000.0 (ICRS)
- Constellation: Telescopium
- Right ascension: 19^{h} 22^{m} 51.20608^{s}
- Declination: −54° 25′ 26.1456″
- Apparent magnitude (V): +5.05

Characteristics
- Evolutionary stage: main sequence
- Spectral type: A0 Vn + M7V/M8V
- B−V color index: +0.02

Astrometry
Radial velocity (R_{v})	−5.6±2.8 km/s
Proper motion (μ)	RA: 25.824±0.073 mas/yr Dec.: −82.965±0.061 mas/yr
Parallax (π)	20.6028±0.0988 mas
Distance	158.3 ± 0.8 ly (48.5 ± 0.2 pc)
Absolute magnitude (M_{V})	+1.61

Orbit
Primary	A
Secondary	B
Period (P)	1,250+860 −420 years
Semi-major axis (a)	148+60 −34 AU
Eccentricity (e)	0.67+0.27 −0.41
Inclination (i)	81°+4° −14°°
Longitude of the node (Ω)	168.1+6.1 −4.2 or 347.7+5.0 −6.5°
Argument of periastron (ω) (secondary)	177±72°

Details

A
Mass	2.09±0.07 M_{☉}
Radius	1.61 R_{☉}
Luminosity	24 L_{☉}
Surface gravity (log g)	4.60 cgs
Temperature	11,941±406 K
Rotational velocity (v sin i)	330 km/s
Age	12 Myr

B
Mass	11+35 −8, 35+7 −8, 48±15 M_{Jup}
Radius	2.28±0.03 R_{Jup}
Luminosity	3.311+0.077 −0.075×10^{−3} L_{☉}
Surface gravity (log g)	4.3+0.1 −0.2 cgs
Temperature	2,830+20 −30 K
Age	~23 Myr

Other designations
- η Tel, CPD−54°9339, HD 181296, HIP 95261, HR 7329, SAO 246055

Database references
SIMBAD	data

Eta Telescopii (η Telescopii) is a white-hued star in the southern constellation of Telescopium. This is an A-type main sequence star with an apparent visual magnitude of +5.03. It is approximately 158 light years from Earth and is a member of the Beta Pictoris Moving Group of stars that share a common motion through space. It forms a wide binary system with the star HD 181327 and has a substellar companion orbiting around it, named Eta Telescopii B.

== Characteristics ==
Eta Telescopii is an A-type main-sequence star with 2.09 times the mass and 1.61 times the Sun's radius. It is radiating around 24 times the Sun's luminosity from its photosphere at an effective temperature of 11,941 K. The age of the star is only about 12 million years. It is emitting an excess of infrared radiation that suggests the presence of a circumstellar disk of dust at an orbital radius of 24 AU, and an unresolved asteroid belt at 4 AU from the host star. Subsequent imaging showed there were no objects of 20 Jupiter masses or greater between the disk and the brown dwarf, leading the researchers Neuhäuser and colleagues to postulate that the brown dwarf had an eccentric orbit – if 200 AU were its furthest distance from the primary (apocenter), then it could come as close as 71 AU with an average distance of 136 AU. More recent observations support this hypothesis, as Eta Telescopii B was found to have an eccentricity of 0.5 and an apocenter of 214 AU, close to its current distance of 209 AU.

Observations with the MIRI spectometer aboard the James Webb Space Telescope show that the disk is axisymmetrical and possibly misaligned with the companion Eta Telescopii B. This suggest that, in the simplest scenario, there is an additional planet that have not been detected. The planet is expected to have a mass between 0.7 and 30 M_{J} and a semi-major axis of 3–19 AU. Further modelling of the disk's parameters is needed to reduce uncertainites and determine if it is really misaligned.

Eta Telescopii is in fact a triple star system; further away, separated by 7', is the common proper motion companion HD 181327, a yellow-white main sequence star of spectral type F6V and apparent magnitude 7.0, which is separated from Eta Telescopii from 7' in the sky and has its own debris disk. This disk has a sharply defined inner edge at 82 AU, indicating a likely planet between 55 and 82.3 AU from the star.

== Substellar companion ==
In 1998, imaging with the Hubble Space Telescope revealed a 12th magnitude object around 4" distant from Eta Telescopii, and calculated to be a brown dwarf of spectral type M7V or M8V with a surface temperature of around 2600 K. This companion is named Eta Telescopii B. Its orbit is uncertain due to the long period and lack of orbital coverage, but is thought to last around a thousand years with a semi-major axis of 148+60
−34 AU and an eccentricity of 0.67+0.27
−0.41. Its mass has been estimated dynamically based on its orbit, with three values of 11+35
−8 M_{J}, 35+7
−8 M_{J} and 48±15 M_{J}, although these values are largely prior-driven and the orbit is poorly known. Its radius is 2.3 times the radius of Jupiter.
