= Delta2 Telescopii =

Star in the constellation Telescopium

Delta^{2} Telescopii
Observation data Epoch J2000.0 Equinox J2000.0 (ICRS)
- Constellation: Telescopium
- Right ascension: 18^{h} 32^{m} 01.94437^{s}
- Declination: −45° 45′ 26.5636″
- Apparent magnitude (V): 5.05

Characteristics
- Evolutionary stage: subgiant
- Spectral type: B3 IV/V or B3 III
- U−B color index: −0.52
- B−V color index: −0.12

Astrometry
Proper motion (μ)	RA: +0.16 mas/yr Dec.: −10.23 mas/yr
Parallax (π)	2.73±0.26 mas
Distance	1,200 ± 100 ly (370 ± 30 pc)
Absolute magnitude (M_{V})	−1.46

Orbit
Period (P)	21.7056 d
Eccentricity (e)	0.22
Periastron epoch (T)	2,435,216.669 JD
Argument of periastron (ω) (secondary)	12.7°
Semi-amplitude (K_{1}) (primary)	34.9 km/s

Details
Mass	7.6±0.1 M_{☉}
Radius	7,2 R_{☉}
Luminosity (bolometric)	5,129 L_{☉}
Surface gravity (log g)	3.37 cgs
Temperature	17,100 K
Rotational velocity (v sin i)	0 or 45 km/s
Age	39.8±7.6 Myr

Other designations
- δ^{2} Tel, CD−45°12556, HD 170523, HIP 90853, HR 6938, SAO 229095

Database references
SIMBAD	data

Delta^{2} Telescopii is a blue-white-hued binary star system in the southern constellation of Telescopium. It is faintly visible to the naked eye, having an apparent visual magnitude of 5.05. The distance to this system, as determined with an annual parallax shift of 2.73 mas, is roughly 1,200 light-years. At that distance, the visual magnitude of the star is diminished by an extinction of 0.36 due to interstellar dust. The pair have an orbital period of 21.7 days and an eccentricity of 0.22. For the merged stellar classification, Houk (1978) gives B3 IV/V, while Levato (1975) lists a more evolved class of B3 III. It appears to be a relatively young system, barely 40 million years old.
