= Iota Telescopii =

K-type giant; Telescopium

ι Telescopii
- Location of Iota Telescopii (circled)

Observation data Epoch J2000.0 Equinox ICRS
- Constellation: Telescopium
- Right ascension: 19^{h} 35^{m} 12.98634^{s}
- Declination: −48° 05′ 57.1238″
- Apparent magnitude (V): 4.88±0.01

Characteristics
- Spectral type: K0 III
- B−V color index: +1.09

Astrometry
Radial velocity (R_{v})	+22.3±0.8 km/s
Proper motion (μ)	RA: −8.190 mas/yr Dec.: −36.977 mas/yr
Parallax (π)	8.6546±0.1055 mas
Distance	377 ± 5 ly (116 ± 1 pc)
Absolute magnitude (M_{V})	−0.39

Details
Mass	2.53±0.19 M_{☉}
Radius	19.7±1.0 R_{☉}
Luminosity	172^{+5}_{−4} L_{☉}
Surface gravity (log g)	1.88 cgs
Temperature	4,738±55 K
Metallicity [Fe/H]	+0.01±0.04 dex
Rotational velocity (v sin i)	1.8±1.3 km/s

Other designations
- ι Tel, 64 G. Telescopii, CD−48°13161, CPD−48°10202, FK5 735, GC 27025, HD 184127, HIP 96341, HR 7424, SAO 229751

Database references
SIMBAD	data

ι Telescopii, Latinized as Iota Telescopii and abbreviated Iota Tel, is a solitary star located in the southern constellation Telescopium. It is faintly visible to the naked eye as an orange-hued star with an apparent visual magnitude of +4.88. The star is located roughly 377 light years distant from the Solar System based on Gaia DR3 parallax measurements and it is receding with a radial velocity of 22.3 km/s. At its current distance, Iota Tel's brightness is diminished by 0.19 magnitudes due to interstellar dust and it has an absolute magnitude of −0.39.

This object is an aging red giant star with a stellar classification of K0 III. At present it has 2.53 times the mass of the Sun, but it has expanded to 19.7 times the radius of the Sun. It is radiating 172 times the Sun's luminosity from its swollen photosphere at an effective temperature of 4,738 K. Iota Tel has a near solar metallicity at [Fe/H] = +0.01 and it spins slowly with a projected rotational velocity of 1.8 km/s.
