= HD 191760 =

Star in the constellation Telescopium

Observation data Epoch J2000.0 Equinox ICRS
- Constellation: Telescopium
- Right ascension: 20^{h} 13^{m} 26.74628^{s}
- Declination: −46° 12′ 03.7089″
- Apparent magnitude (V): 8.26

Characteristics
- Evolutionary stage: Subgiant
- Spectral type: G3IV/V
- B−V color index: 0.668±0.014
- Variable type: Constant

Astrometry
Radial velocity (R_{v})	−30.06±0.20 km/s
Proper motion (μ)	RA: −0.723 mas/yr Dec.: −62.019 mas/yr
Parallax (π)	11.2610±0.1091 mas
Distance	290 ± 3 ly (88.8 ± 0.9 pc)
Absolute magnitude (M_{V})	3.71

Orbit
Period (P)	505.65±0.42 d
Semi-major axis (a)	1.35 AU
Eccentricity (e)	0.63±0.01
Inclination (i)	158.96±5.99°
Periastron epoch (T)	2454835.65±2.06
Argument of periastron (ω) (secondary)	200.37±0.28°
Semi-amplitude (K_{1}) (primary)	1.04783±0.03871 km/s

Details
Mass	1.28+0.02 −0.10 M_{☉}
Radius	1.62±0.07 R_{☉}
Luminosity	2.69±0.20 L_{☉}
Surface gravity (log g)	4.13+0.05 −0.04 cgs
Temperature	5,794±76 K
Metallicity [Fe/H]	0.29±0.07 dex
Rotation	25.2 or 35.1 d
Rotational velocity (v sin i)	2.33±0.05 km/s
Age	4.1+0.8 −2.8 Gyr

HD 191760 b
Mass	106.34±29.03 M_{Jup}

Other designations
- CD−46°13445, HD 191760, HIP 99661, SAO 230105

Database references
SIMBAD	data

HD 191760 is a star in the southern constellation of Telescopium. It has a yellow hue but is too dim to be visible to the naked eye with an apparent visual magnitude of 8.26. The star is located at a distance of approximately 290 light-years from the Sun based on parallax, but is drifting closer with a radial velocity of −30 km/s.

The stellar classification of G3IV/V is consistent with a star that is evolving onto the subgiant branch, having exhausted the supply of hydrogen at its core. It is roughly four billion years old with a modest projected rotational velocity of 2.3 km/s. The star is 28% more massive than the Sun and 62% as large. The metallicity, or abundance of heavier elements, is higher than in the Sun. The star is radiating 2.7 times the luminosity of the Sun from its photosphere at an effective temperature of 5,794 K.

== Companion ==
Using the ESO HARPS instrument, in 2009 HD 191760 was found to have a brown dwarf at least 38 times as massive as Jupiter orbiting at an average distance of 1.35 AU in a period of 506 days. This is an unusual distance from the star that has been termed the 'brown dwarf desert'. The upper limit on the mass of this object is 28% of the mass of the Sun (0.28 M_{☉}).

In 2023, the true mass of this object was determined using Gaia astrometry. At about 106 times the mass of Jupiter, this is a low-mass star (presumably a red dwarf) and not a brown dwarf.
