= Xi Telescopii =

Star in the constellation Telescopium

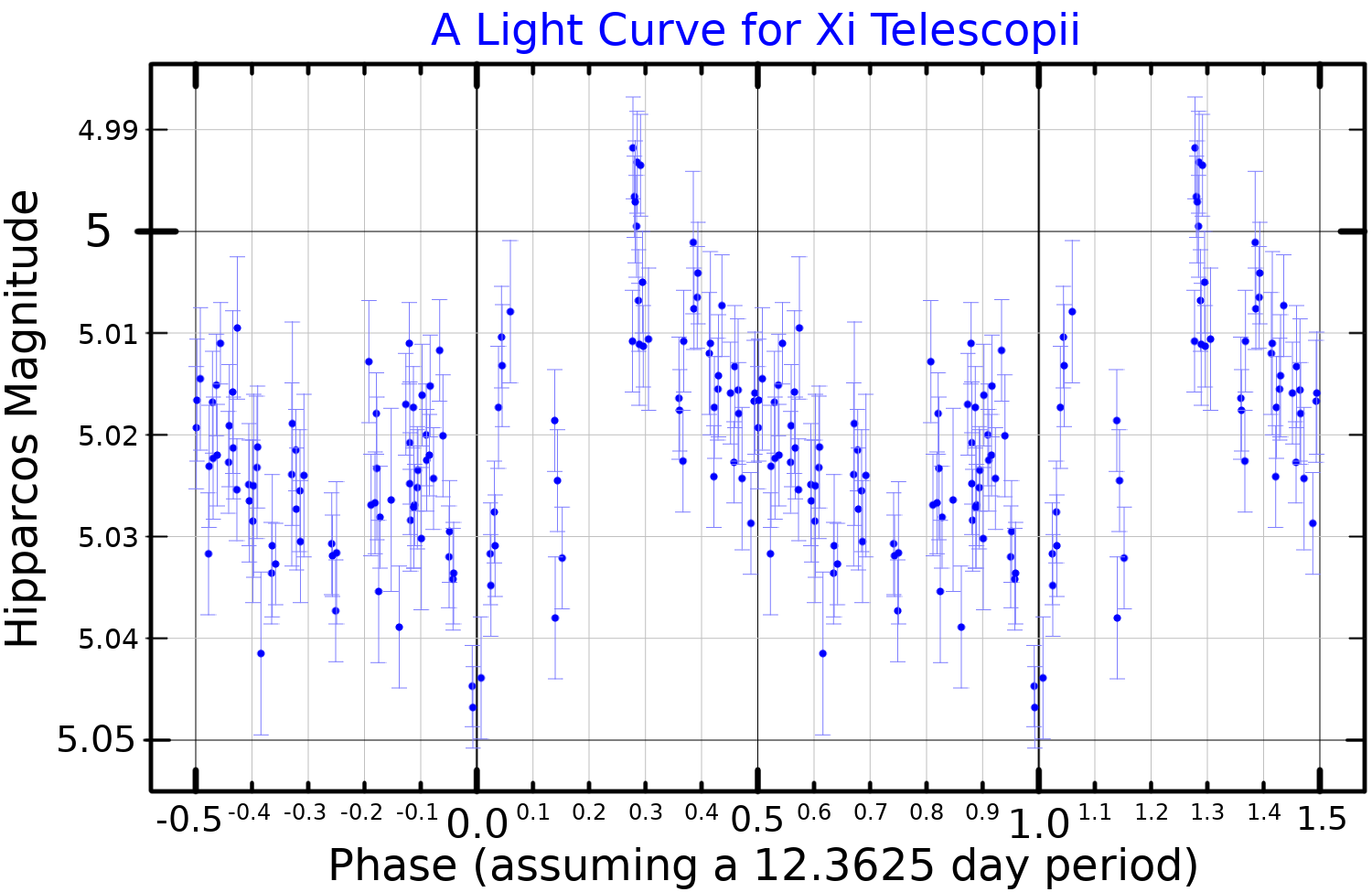
- A light curve for Xi Telescopii, plotted from Hipparcos data

Observation data Epoch J2000.0 Equinox J2000.0 (ICRS)
- Constellation: Telescopium
- Right ascension: 20^{h} 07^{m} 23.15599^{s}
- Declination: −52° 52′ 50.8490″
- Apparent magnitude (V): +4.89 – 4.94

Characteristics
- Evolutionary stage: red giant branch
- Spectral type: K5 III or M1 IIab
- U−B color index: +1.90
- B−V color index: +1.61
- Variable type: LB:

Astrometry
Radial velocity (R_{v})	+36.0 km/s
Proper motion (μ)	RA: −12.98 mas/yr Dec.: +7.50 mas/yr
Parallax (π)	3.02±0.35 mas
Distance	approx. 1,100 ly (approx. 330 pc)
Absolute magnitude (M_{V})	−2.64

Details
Mass	6.6 M_{☉}
Radius	134 R_{☉}
Luminosity	3,413 L_{☉}
Surface gravity (log g)	0.99 cgs
Temperature	4,529 K

Other designations
- ξ Tel, CPD−53°9794, FK5 755, HD 190421, HIP 99120, HR 7673, SAO 246443

Database references
SIMBAD	data

Xi Telescopii, Latinized from ξ Telescopii, is a solitary star in the southern constellation of Telescopium. It is visible to the naked eye, with an apparent visual magnitude of +4.9. Based upon an annual parallax shift of 3.02 mas as measured from Earth, it is located approximately 1,100 light-years from the Sun.

This is an evolved star with a stellar classification of K5 III or M1 IIab, indicating it is a giant or bright giant star. This is a variable star tentatively classified as a slow irregular-type variable with a brightness that varies between magnitude +4.89 and +4.94. Koen and Eyer examined the Hipparcos data for this star, and found that it varied periodically, with a period of 12.36 days, and an amplitude of 0.0083 magnitudes. With around 134 times the Sun's radius, it shines with a luminosity approximately 3,400 times that of the Sun and has a surface temperature of 4,529 K.
