= Gliese 754 =

Star in the constellation of Telescopium

- Location of Gliese 754 in the constellation Telescopium

Observation data Epoch J2000.0 Equinox ICRS
- Constellation: Telescopium
- Right ascension: 19^{h} 20^{m} 47.98432^{s}
- Declination: −45° 33′ 29.6435″
- Apparent magnitude (V): 12.25

Characteristics
- Spectral type: M4V

Astrometry
Radial velocity (R_{v})	+6.04±0.19 km/s
Proper motion (μ)	RA: +658.775 mas/yr Dec.: −2,896.150 mas/yr
Parallax (π)	169.2351±0.0588 mas
Distance	19.272 ± 0.007 ly (5.909 ± 0.002 pc)

Details
Mass	0.173 M_{☉}
Radius	0.205 R_{☉}
Luminosity	0.005 L_{☉}
Temperature	3,202±100 K
Metallicity [Fe/H]	−0.169 dex
Rotation	132.651 days

Other designations
- GJ 754, L 347-14, LHS 60, LTT 7652, 2MASS J19204795-4533283

Database references
SIMBAD	data

Gliese 754 is a dim star in the southern constellation of Telescopium. It has an apparent visual magnitude of 12.25, which requires a telescope to view. The star is located at a distance of 19.3 light-years from the Sun based on parallax, and it is drifting further away with a radial velocity of +6 km/s. It is one of the hundred closest stars to the Solar System. Calculations of its orbit around the Milky Way showed that it is eccentric, and indicate that it might be a thick disk object.

The stellar classification of Gliese 754 is M4V, indicating that this is a small red dwarf star on the core hydrogen fusing main sequence. It has 17% of the mass of the Sun and 21% of the Sun's radius. The star is fully convective and is a source of X-ray emission. It is rotating slowly with a period of about 133 days. The metallicity is sub-solar, indicating it has a lower abundance of heavy elements compared to the Sun. It is radiating just 0.5% of the luminosity of the Sun from its photosphere at an effective temperature of around 3,202 K.

== Search for planets ==
In June 2019, a candidate exoplanet in orbit around Gliese 754 was reported in a preprint. It was detected using the Doppler method and is orbiting at a distance of 0.28 AU with a period of 78 days. The orbit is essentially circular, to within the margin of error. The habitable zone for this star ranges from 0.05 AU to 0.14 AU; inside the orbit of this proposed companion. However, a 2024 study could not confirm any planet around this star. A 77-day signal was detected, similar to the orbital period of this putative planet, but this may be caused by stellar activity.
