= BL Telescopii =

Star in the constellation Telescopium

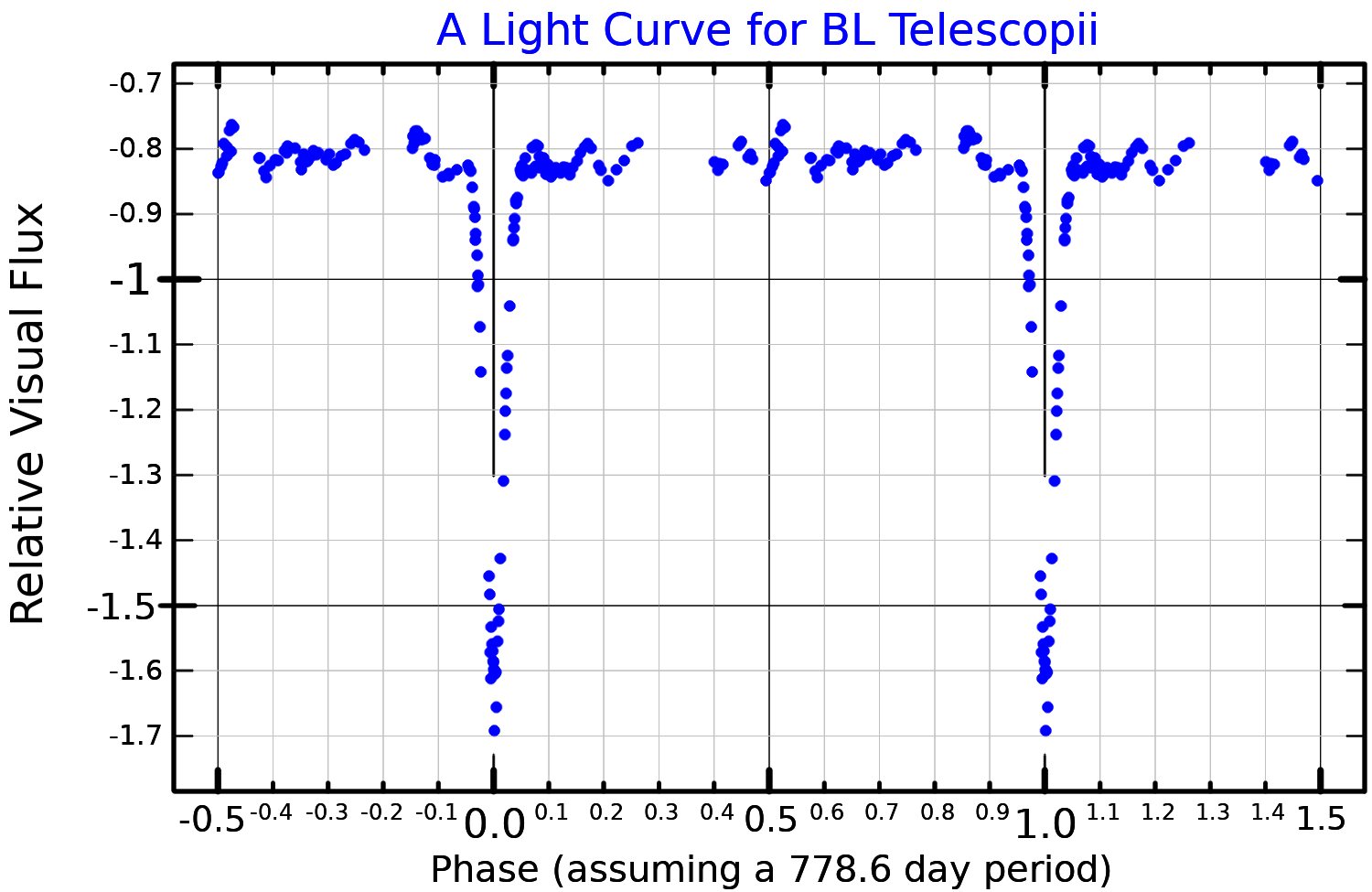
- A visual band light curve for BL Telescopii, plotted from data published by van Genderen (1983)

Observation data Epoch J2000.0 Equinox ICRS
- Constellation: Telescopium
- Right ascension: 19^{h} 06^{m} 38.10893^{s}
- Declination: −51° 25′ 03.2131″
- Apparent magnitude (V): 7.09 - 9.08

Characteristics
- Spectral type: F4Ib+M
- Variable type: Algol

Astrometry
| Radial velocity (R_{v}) | +98.57 km/s |
| Proper motion (μ) | RA: -6.876 mas/yr Dec.: 0.525 mas/yr |
| Parallax (π) | 0.6223±0.0410 mas |
| Distance | 5,200 ± 300 ly (1,600 ± 100 pc) |
| Absolute magnitude (M_{V}) | −4.5 |

Orbit
| Period (P) | 778.0 d |
| Eccentricity (e) | 0.31±0.02 |
| Inclination (i) | ~68° |
| Semi-amplitude (K_{1}) (primary) | 19.3±0.5 km/s |

Details
| Radius | 64 R_{☉} |
| Luminosity | 3,225 L_{☉} |
| Temperature | 5,438 K |

Other designations
- CD−51 11917, HD 177300, HIP 93844

Database references
| SIMBAD | data |

BL Telescopii is a multiple star in the constellation Telescopium. An Algol-like eclipsing binary, the star system varies between apparent magnitudes 7.09 and 9.08 in just over 778 days (2 years 48 days), which is generally too faint to be seen with the unaided eye. This is mainly due to the system being an eclipsing binary (that is, one star passing in front of the other star and resulting in a change in brightness). The eclipse itself dims the star by two magnitudes and lasts around 104 days.

Dutch astronomer Willem Jacob Luyten noted this star to be variable in 1935. Minima were retrospectively identified in old photographic plates from 1913 and 1919, and then observed by Howarth in 1936. Initially thought to be an R Coronae Borealis variable, its true nature as an eclipsing binary became clear in the 1940s.

The primary component is a yellow supergiant, whose spectral type has been calculated as either F5Iab/b or F4Ib. It is intrinsically variable, varying in brightness by 0.02 magnitude. It has pulsations of two periods, 92.5 days and 64.8 days in length. It has been classified as a UU Herculis variable—a class of yellow supergiant with semiregular variability. These stars are thought to have affinities with Cepheid variables and lie near the instability strip on the Hertzsprung–Russell diagram. The secondary was identified as an M-type star from TiO (titanium oxide) absorption bands visible during the eclipses.

The BL Telescopii system lies outside the galactic plane and has a high space velocity; it is a runaway star.
