= RR Telescopii =

1944 nova in the constellation Telescopium

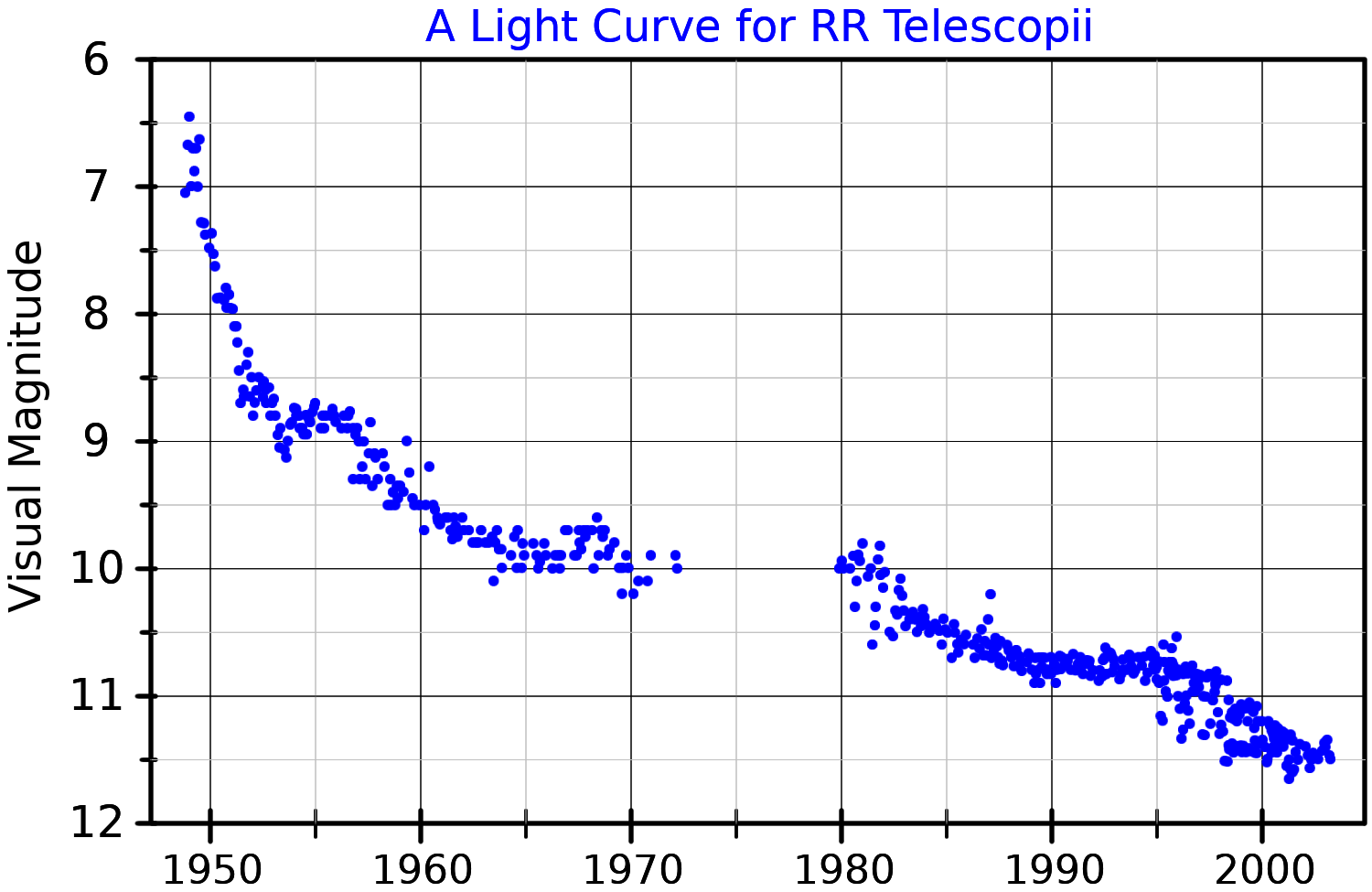
- A visual band light curve for RR Telescopii, adapted from Kotnik-Karuza et al. (2006)

Observation data Epoch J2000 Equinox ICRS
- Constellation: Telescopium
- Right ascension: 20^{h} 04^{m} 18.538^{s}
- Declination: −55° 43′ 33.15″
- Apparent magnitude (V): ≈12 (in 2013)

Characteristics
- Evolutionary stage: WN3–6.5+M3.5–7
- Variable type: Symbiotic nova

Astrometry
Proper motion (μ)	RA: 3.342±0.305 mas/yr Dec.: −3.225±0.280 mas/yr
Distance	2,700 pc

Details

cool
Mass	0.9 M_{☉}
Radius	457 (Note: Applying the Stefan–Boltzmann Law with a nominal solar effective temperature of 5,772 K: $$\sqrt{(5772/2500)^4 * 7350} = 457\ R\odot$$)–518 (Note: Applying the Stefan–Boltzmann Law with a nominal solar effective temperature of 5,772 K: $$\sqrt{(5772/2500)^4 * 9450} = 518.189\ R\odot$$) R_{☉}
Luminosity	7,350–9,450 L_{☉}
Temperature	2,500 K

hot
Radius	0.08 R_{☉}
Luminosity	3,500–9,000 L_{☉}
Surface gravity (log g)	6.0 cgs
Temperature	140,000 K

Other designations
- Nova Tel 1948, AAVSO 1956-56, IRAS 20003-5552, 2MASS J20041854-5543331

Database references
SIMBAD	data

RR Telescopii is a symbiotic nova in the southern constellation Telescopium. It was recorded on photographic survey plates as a faint variable star between photographic magnitude (m_{pg}) 9 to 16.6 from 1889 to 1944. In late 1944 the star began to brighten, increasing by about 7 magnitudes, from m_{pg} ≈ 14 to brighter than 8. Brightening continued with a diminished rate of increase after early 1945, but the overall outburst was not noted until the star was seen at about 6.0, the threshold of naked eye brightness, in July 1948. At that time it was given the designation Nova Telescopii 1948. Since mid-1949 it has declined in brightness slowly, albeit accompanied by some remarkable changes in its spectrum, and as of August 2013 it had faded to visual magnitude around 12.

== Pre-eruption and outburst ==
RR Telescopii was periodically observed in a survey program by the southern station of Harvard College Observatory starting in 1889, as well as other southern observatories begun at later dates. Williamina Fleming in 1908 reported variations in brightness between about magnitude 9 and 11.5, and suggested it might be the same type of star as SS Cygni. In later plates it showed modest irregular variability between m_{pg} 12.5 and 14, up to about 1930. At that time it began slow periodic variations in brightness between magnitudes 12 and 16; the period of these variations was 387 days, and the star could be characterized as a peculiar semi-regular variable. No spectra seem to have been taken of the star prior to outburst, since it was too faint to be included in the Henry Draper Catalog and was undistinguished until outburst.

In 1944 the periodic variations broke off, and RR Tel brightened by more than 7 magnitudes over the course of about four years. Starting about m_{pg} 14 in late 1944, survey plates recorded it brighter than magnitude 8 early in 1945, and the star was observed at m_{pg} 7.4 in September–October 1946, 7.0 in March 1948, and 6.0 in July 1948. In 1948 it was noticed, and received the designation Nova Tel 1948. In July 1949 the star began fading slowly. The information about RR Tel's pre-outburst behavior as seen in the Harvard survey plates was published by Margaret Mayall in February 1949, and the already long duration of the outburst, years as opposed to days or weeks, made it clear that RR Tel had to be very different from the novae which had been previously observed; it was called a slow nova in acknowledgement of that not understood difference.

The first spectroscopic observations were made in June 1949 before it began fading, when the spectrum showed a pure absorption spectrum resembling that of an F-type supergiant. The next spectra were taken in September–October of that year, by which time the character of the spectrum had changed to a continuum with many emission lines but no discernible absorption lines.

== Decline ==
In visible light, RR Tel has faded steadily (albeit not with a constant rate) since 1949. It was about visual magnitude 10.0 in 1977 and is about magnitude 11.8 in mid-2013. Its visible spectrum has kept the same general character, though it has evolved to include emission lines of progressively higher excitation, including both permitted lines and forbidden lines of many elements. Absorption features due to TiO (the hallmark of M stars) were seen in the spectrum of RR Tel beginning in the 1960s.

As other wavelengths became observable with instruments resulting from advancing technology, these tools were turned upon RR Tel. Infrared photometry found an excess of radiation from 1 to 20 μm, indicating the presence of circumstellar dust with a temperature of a few hundred kelvin. Observing at shorter wavelengths has been very productive. RR Tel was observed in the ultraviolet with IUE, the ultraviolet spectrometer aboard Voyager 1, and Hubble Space Telescope, and in X-rays with Einstein Observatory, EXOSAT, and ROSAT. Observing in the ultraviolet in particular allows direct detection of the white dwarf component of the system, which was impossible before the advent of the space observatories.

== Physical model ==
As a symbiotic star, RR Tel consists of a late-type red giant star in mutual orbit with a white dwarf, with substantial amounts of hot gas and warm dust around the two stars. The red giant is frequently referred to as a Mira, though the only real attempt at characterization of the pre-outburst system gave a different type of pulsating late-type giant star. The observed infrared colors and visible and infrared spectra features can be matched by a star of spectral type M5III. Such cool pulsating variable stars are known to produce circumstellar dust in the slow stellar winds flowing off such stars. No orbital velocity shifts have been detected, so the orbital separation is probably large (several AU) and the orbital period is years or decades.

In the "low state" (referring to the pre-outburst phase), the M giant pulsates and loses mass, and the pulsation was apparent in the 1930–1944 portion of the pre-outburst visible light curve. Some of the matter lost by the M giant accretes onto the white dwarf. This accreted matter is hydrogen-rich – that is, it has normal stellar composition. When this hydrogen-rich accreted layer becomes thick enough and hot enough, nuclear fusion reactions begin at the bottom, the densest and hottest part of this material. The sudden intense energy generation in this accreted material near the surface of the white dwarf gives rise to the outburst.

At first, the accreted matter is thick enough that it greatly expands and its surface reaches a temperature of 5000 to 10000 K, giving rise to the "F supergiant" absorption spectrum seen in RR Tel into the summer of 1949. As the energy production continues, the accreted matter continues to be heated by the nuclear energy release below, so it becomes hotter, more highly ionized and less dense, so that the emerging radiation becomes harder: its black-body spectrum peaks at progressively shorter wavelengths due to the increasing gas temperatures as time advances. In the visible part of the spectrum, the black-body spectrum makes very little light, but the hot, thin, increasingly ionized gas shows a rich variety of emission lines of many species. The luminosity of the system remains constant, so that the radiation observed comes from a progressively smaller but hotter volume of space closer to the white dwarf. Analysis of the optical, ultraviolet, and X-ray data in the early 1990s indicated a white dwarf star with an effective temperature of about 142,000 K, a luminosity of 3500 L_{☉}, and a surface gravity about 100 times that of the Sun, indicating a mass of about 0.9 M_{☉}. There is also a small volume of gas with a temperature of several million K, which is the product of the collision between the winds from the two stars. Hot white dwarf stars often have stellar winds with higher velocities than the winds from red giants; a wind from RR Tel's white dwarf with a velocity of about 500 km·s^{−1} would be able to produce the million-degree gas.
