= Epsilon Telescopii =

Star in the constellation Telescopus

ε Telescopii
- Location of ε Telescopii (circled in red)

Observation data Epoch J2000.0 Equinox ICRS
- Constellation: Telescopium
- Right ascension: 18^{h} 11^{m} 13.7612^{s}
- Declination: −45° 57′ 15.882″
- Apparent magnitude (V): 4.50±0.01

Characteristics
- Evolutionary stage: red giant branch
- Spectral type: K0 III
- U−B color index: +0.78
- B−V color index: +1.01

Astrometry
Radial velocity (R_{v})	−26.3±0.8 km/s
Proper motion (μ)	RA: −18.837 mas/yr Dec.: −38.102 mas/yr
Parallax (π)	8.0405±0.321 mas
Distance	410 ± 20 ly (124 ± 5 pc)
Absolute magnitude (M_{V})	−1.00

Details
Mass	3.9 M_{☉}
Radius	20 R_{☉}
Luminosity	256 L_{☉}
Surface gravity (log g)	2.32±0.12 cgs
Temperature	4,996±42 K
Metallicity [Fe/H]	−0.07±0.04 dex
Rotational velocity (v sin i)	6.1 km/s

Other designations
- ε Tel, CD−45°12251, FK5 1473, HD 166063, HIP 89112, HR 6783, SAO 228777

Database references
SIMBAD	data

Epsilon Telescopii, Latinized from ε Telescopii, is a solitary, orange-hued star in the southern constellation of Telescopium. It is visible to the naked eye with an apparent visual magnitude of +4.53. Based upon an annual parallax shift of 7.80 mas as seen from Earth, it is located roughly 410 light years from the Sun, give or take 20 light years.

This an evolved K-type giant with a stellar classification of K0 III. It displays an infrared excess, suggesting the presence of an orbiting disk of dust. The star is radiating 293 times the Sun's luminosity from its photosphere at an effective temperature of 4,996 K. It has a 13th magnitude optical companion at an angular separation of 16.30 arcseconds along a position angle of 233°, as of 2000.
