= HM Sagittae =

Symbiotic nova in the constellation of Sagitta

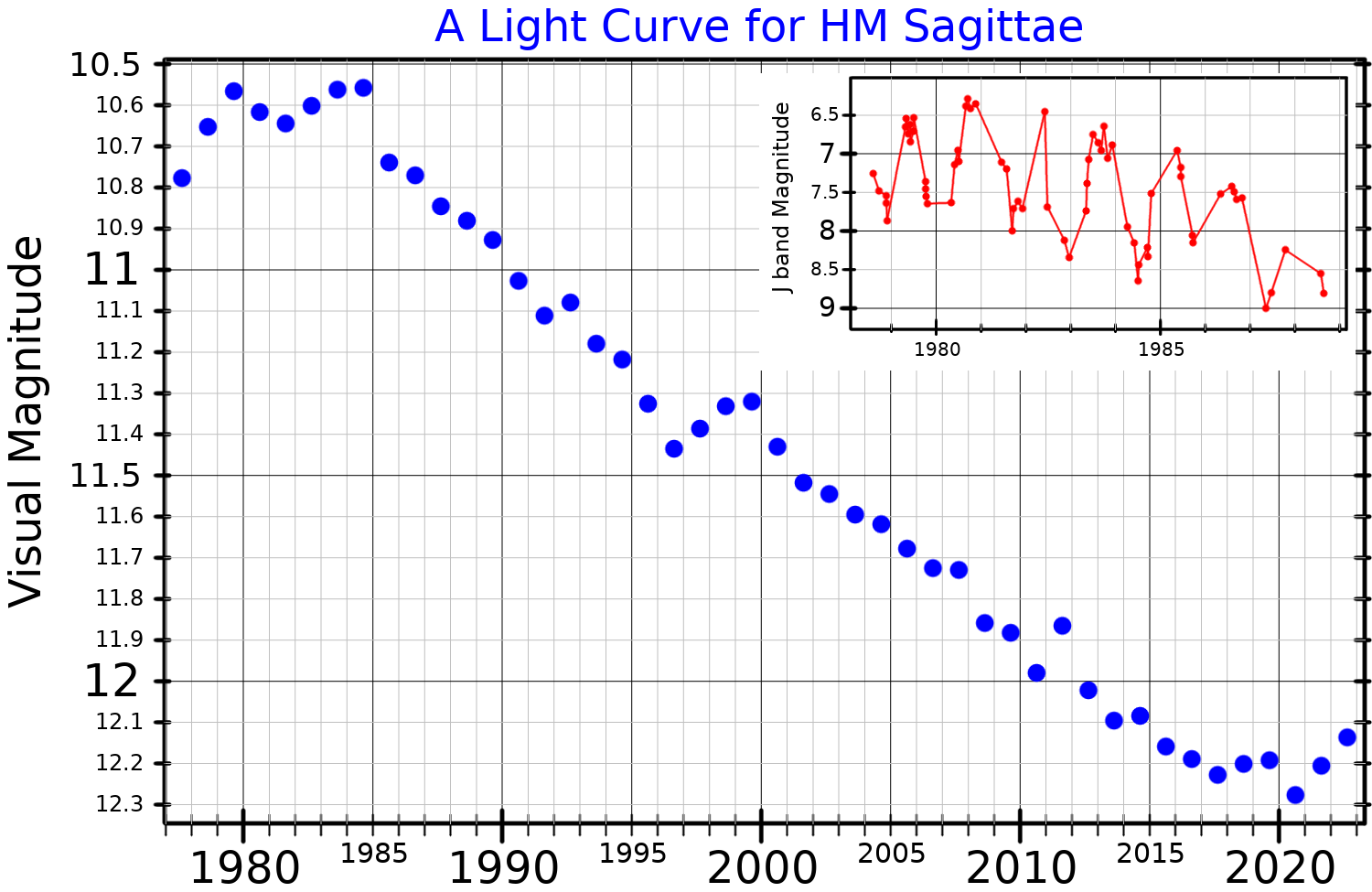
- A light curve for HM Sagittae. The main plot shows 1-year averages of AAVSO visual band data. The inset plot (adapted from Munari and Whitelock) shows near-infrared variability arising from the red giant's pulsations.

Observation data Epoch J2000.0 Equinox ICRS
- Constellation: Sagitta
- Right ascension: 19^{h} 41^{m} 57.080^{s}
- Declination: +16° 44′ 39.81″
- Apparent magnitude (V): 10.99

Characteristics
- Spectral type: M7
- Apparent magnitude (pg): 11.10 to 18
- B−V color index: 2.38
- Variable type: NC + M

Astrometry
Proper motion (μ)	RA: −0.443 mas/yr Dec.: −7.104 mas/yr
Parallax (π)	0.9735±0.1033 mas
Distance	approx. 3,400 ly (approx. 1,000 pc)

Details

Red giant
Radius	540 R_{☉}
Luminosity	5,000 L_{☉}
Temperature	3,000 K

White dwarf
Radius	0.08 R_{☉}
Luminosity	9,200 L_{☉}
Temperature	200,000 K

Other designations
- HM Sge, Nova Sge 1975, SVS 2183

Database references
SIMBAD	data

HM Sagittae is a dusty-type symbiotic nova in the northern constellation of Sagitta. It was discovered by O. D. Dokuchaeva and colleagues in 1975 when it increased in brightness by six magnitudes (a factor of around 250 brighter). The object displays an emission line spectrum similar to a planetary nebula and was detected in the radio band in 1977. Unlike a classical nova, the optical brightness of this system did not rapidly decrease with time, although it showed some variation. It displays activity in every band of the electromagnetic spectrum from X-ray to radio.

Observations in the infrared during 1978 showed this to be a very strong source with a spectrum that is consistent with a binary symbiotic system similar to V1016 Cyg. The cooler stellar component is emitting material that is then ionized by a hot component, with the emission spectrum coming from heated dust generated by the cooler star. By 1983, the infrared emission of the system was shown to vary by a factor of 1.5 magnitudes in the K-band with a time scale of about 500 days. High resolution spectral examination of the system in 1984 showed a bipolar outflow of matter with a velocity of 200 km/s. A series of knots extend outward on both sides of the central star to an angular distance of 9 arcseconds. The nebula surrounding the system shows a bipolar, S-shaped morphology, similar to R Aqr.

The features of the system are consistent with a central red giant star being orbited by a compact object that is accreting matter from the giant. The pair have an angular separation of 40±9 mas, with the axis aligned along a position angle of 130°±10°. Their physical separation is estimated at 50 astronomical units. The giant component is most likely a Mira variable and measurements up to 1989 found a period of 527 days. It is surrounded by a dusty shell that is mostly composed of silicates. The compact object is a hot white dwarf with 70% of the mass of the Sun, which is orbited by an accretion disk. The nova-like outburst of 1975 may have been generated by a burst of mass transfer from the giant to the white dwarf during the periastron passage of an eccentric orbit, leading to a thermonuclear outburst.

Winds from both stars are colliding to produce a shock region that is a source of ultraviolet emission. By 1985, a fading of the brightness and an increase in redness were observed, caused by dust obscuration. The hot component may be inhibiting dust formation around the giant except in the shadow region behind the star. This could explain observed individual dust obscuration events.
