= NGC 6845 =

Four interacting galaxies in the constellation Telescopium

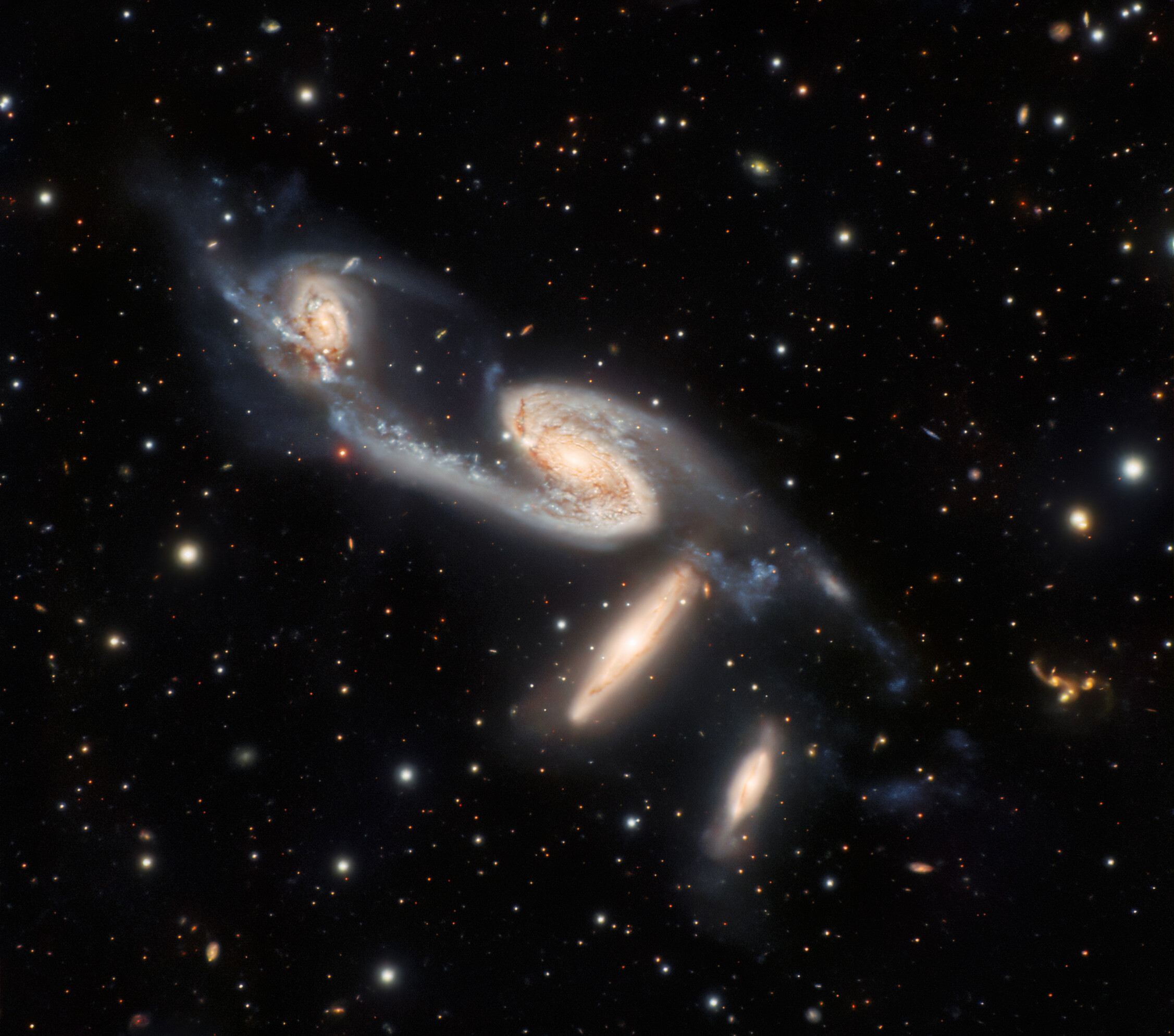
- Gemini Observatory photograph of the galaxy cluster.

Observation data (Epoch J2000.0)
- Constellation(s): Telescopium
- Right ascension: 20^{h} 00^{m} 58.418^{s}
- Declination: −47° 04′ 13.02″
- Redshift: 0.021441
- Distance: 90 Mpc (294 Mly)

Other designations
- PGC 63985

NGC 6845 (also known as Klemola 30) is an interacting system of four galaxies in the constellation Telescopium. The cluster has certain similarities with Stephan's Quintet. Its distance is estimated to be about 90 Mpc.

The components of the galaxy cluster are the two spiral galaxies NGC 6845A and NGC 6845B as well as the two lenticular galaxies NGC 6845C and NGC 6845D. The four galaxies occupy an area of about 4' x 2' in the sky. The largest galaxy in this compact galaxy cluster is NGC 6845A, a barred spiral galaxy. SN 2008DA was a Type II supernova observed in NGC 6845A in June 2008. The dwarf galaxy ATCA J2001-4659, which is found around 4.4' northeast of NGC 6845B, was identified as a companion of NGC 6845.

NGC 6845 was discovered on July 7, 1834 by John Herschel.
