= NGC 6861 =

Lenticular galaxy in the constellation Telescopium

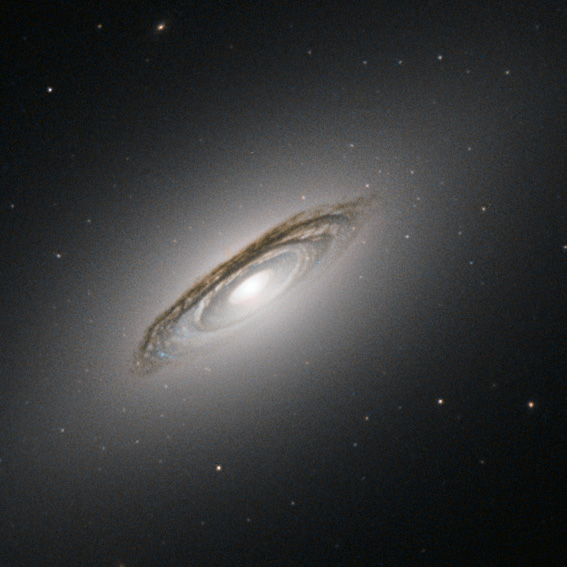
- NGC 6861

Observation data (J2000 epoch)
- Constellation: Telescopium
- Right ascension: 20^{h} 07^{m} 19.48^{s}
- Declination: −48° 22′ 12.8″
- Redshift: 0.009437
- Apparent magnitude (V): 11.0

Characteristics
- Type: SA0^-(s):
- Apparent size (V): 3′ × 2′

Other designations
- IC 4949

NGC 6861 is a lenticular galaxy located in the constellation Telescopium. It is the second-brightest object in the constellation. Unlike most lenticular galaxies, which tend to be mostly devoid of both gas and dust, NGC 6861 exhibits a thick obscuring ring of dust around the nucleus where star formation is occurring. The galaxy was discovered by Scottish astronomer James Dunlop, in 1826. NGC 6861 is interacting with NGC 6868, and it is predicted that they will eventually merge.

== Gallery ==
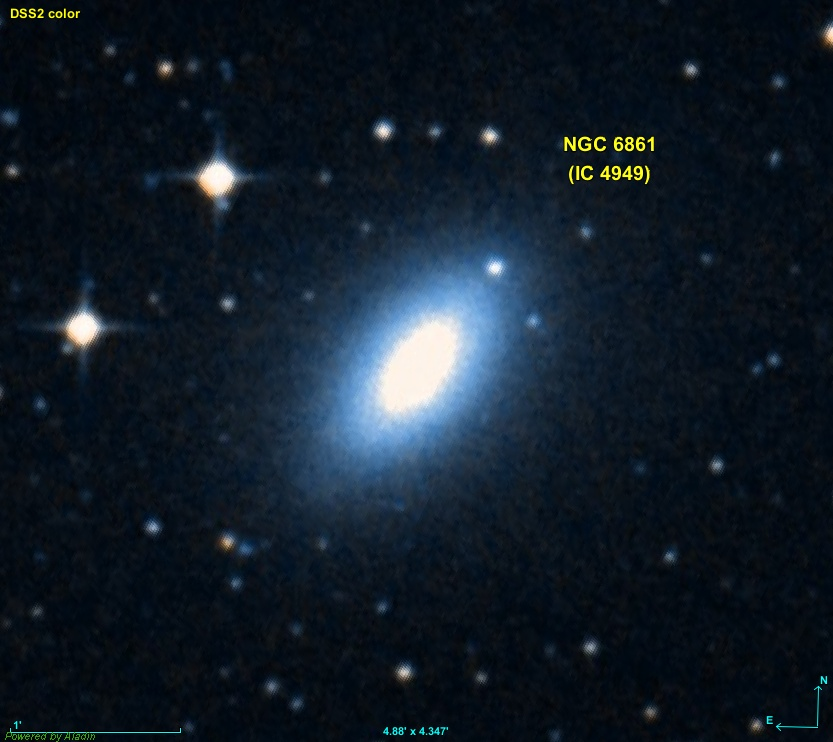
DSS image of NGC 6861
