= PZ Telescopii =

Star in the constellation Telescopium

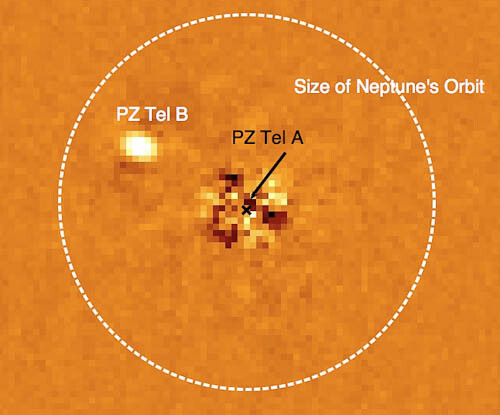
- An image taken by the Gemini South telescope showing PZ Tel A and its brown dwarf companion PZ Tel B. Image analysis techniques were used to remove the vast majority of light from PZ Tel A.

Observation data Epoch J2000 Equinox ICRS
- Constellation: Telescopium
- Right ascension: 18^{h} 53^{m} 05.87351^{s}
- Declination: −50° 10′ 49.8974″
- Apparent magnitude (V): 8.33 - 8.63

Characteristics
- Evolutionary stage: Pre-main-sequence star
- Spectral type: G9 IV + M7±1
- B−V color index: +0.784±0.021
- Variable type: BY Dra

Astrometry
Radial velocity (R_{v})	−0.01+0.12 −0.02 km/s
Proper motion (μ)	RA: +16.272(18) mas/yr Dec.: −85.519(17) mas/yr
Parallax (π)	21.1621±0.0223 mas
Distance	154.1 ± 0.2 ly (47.25 ± 0.05 pc)
Absolute magnitude (M_{V})	4.88

Orbit
Period (P)	140+42 −24 yr
Semi-major axis (a)	28.3+4.6 −2.6 AU
Eccentricity (e)	0.576+0.052 −0.054
Inclination (i)	91.63+0.21 −0.20°
Longitude of the node (Ω)	58.91+0.12 −0.13 or 238.78+0.12 −0.13°
Periastron epoch (T)	1997.2+4.7 −1.8
Argument of periastron (ω) (secondary)	38+14 −10 or 234+13 −11°

Details
Mass	1.142+0.086 −0.081 M_{☉}
Radius	1.23±0.04 R_{☉}
Luminosity	0.993+0.004 −0.005 L_{☉}
Surface gravity (log g)	4.41±0.10 cgs
Temperature	5,338±200 K
Metallicity [Fe/H]	+0.05±0.20 dex
Rotation	0.943±0.002 days
Rotational velocity (v sin i)	69.0±0.1 km/s
Age	24±3 Myr

B
Mass	24.0+9.5 −7.3 M_{Jup}
Radius	2.42+0.38 −0.34 R_{Jup}
Surface gravity (log g)	< 4.5 cgs
Temperature	2,700±100 K

Other designations
- PZ Tel, CD−50°12190, HD 174429, HIP 92680, SAO 245781, PPM 347231, WDS J18531-5011AB

Database references
SIMBAD	data

PZ Telescopii, also known as HD 174429 or simply PZ Tel, is a young star in the constellation Telescopium. Based on parallax measurements, it is located at a distance of 154 light-years from the Sun. It is too faint to be visible to the naked eye, yet it is one of the closest and hence brightest pre-main-sequence stars to Earth.

In 1980, Denis Walter Coates et al. announced that the star, then known as HD 174429, is a variable star. It was given its variable star designation, PZ Telescopii, in 1981. It is classified as a BY Draconis variable that ranges in apparent visual magnitude from 8.33 down to 8.63 over a period of 22.581 hours (0.94088 days).

PZ Telescopii has an effective surface temperature of around 5,338 K (the Sun has an approximate surface temperature of 5,778 K), a mass around 1.13 times, and diameter 1.23 times that of the Sun. The star has a high rate of spin, showing a projected rotational velocity of 69 km/s and a rotation period of 22.6 h. It is radiating about the same luminosity as the Sun. PZ Telescopii was originally considered to be a member of the Beta Pictoris moving group; however in a 2012 paper, James Jenkins of Universidad de Chile and colleagues used three methods to calculate its age and came up with a figure of around 24 million years—significantly older than the 12 million years of the association.

This star has an orbiting debris disk calculated to span from a radius of 35 to 165 astronomical units (AU), as well as a substellar companion with about 28 or 36 times the mass of Jupiter orbiting at a distance of about 16 AU, discovered in 2009 independently by two teams. The companion, currently known as PZ Tel B, is thought to be a brown dwarf; however it is possible (though very unlikely) that it is an extremely large Jupiter-like planet, in which case it would be PZ Tel b, and the first such planet to be directly imaged. Preliminary orbital elements from 2016 give a best fit orbital period of 622.2 years with an eccentricity of 0.755.

The mass and orbit of this companion were updated in 2023 based on Hipparcos and Gaia astrometry, finding a somewhat lower mass, and an edge-on orbit that is eccentric but less so than previous results. It is now included in the NASA Exoplanet Archive since its nominal mass of 27 M_{J} is below their upper limit of 30 M_{J}, although the margin of error is large enough that it is still possible that the mass exceeds 30 M_{J}. Updated values were provided in 2026, providing tighter constraints in the mass and orbit of PZ Telescopii b.

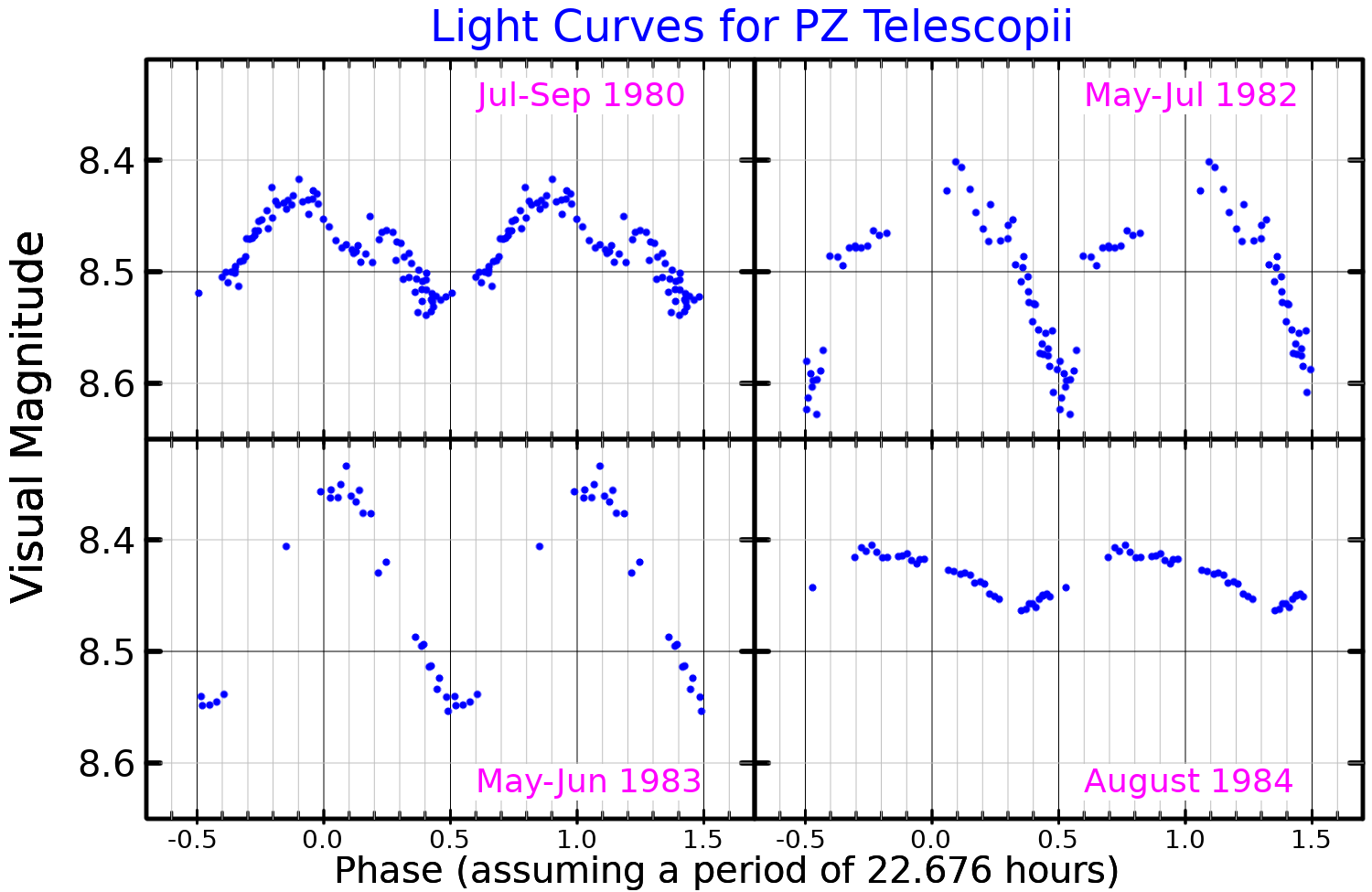
Visual band light curves for PZ Telescopii, adapted from Innis et al. (1990)
