= QS Telescopii =

Binary star system in the constellation Telescopium

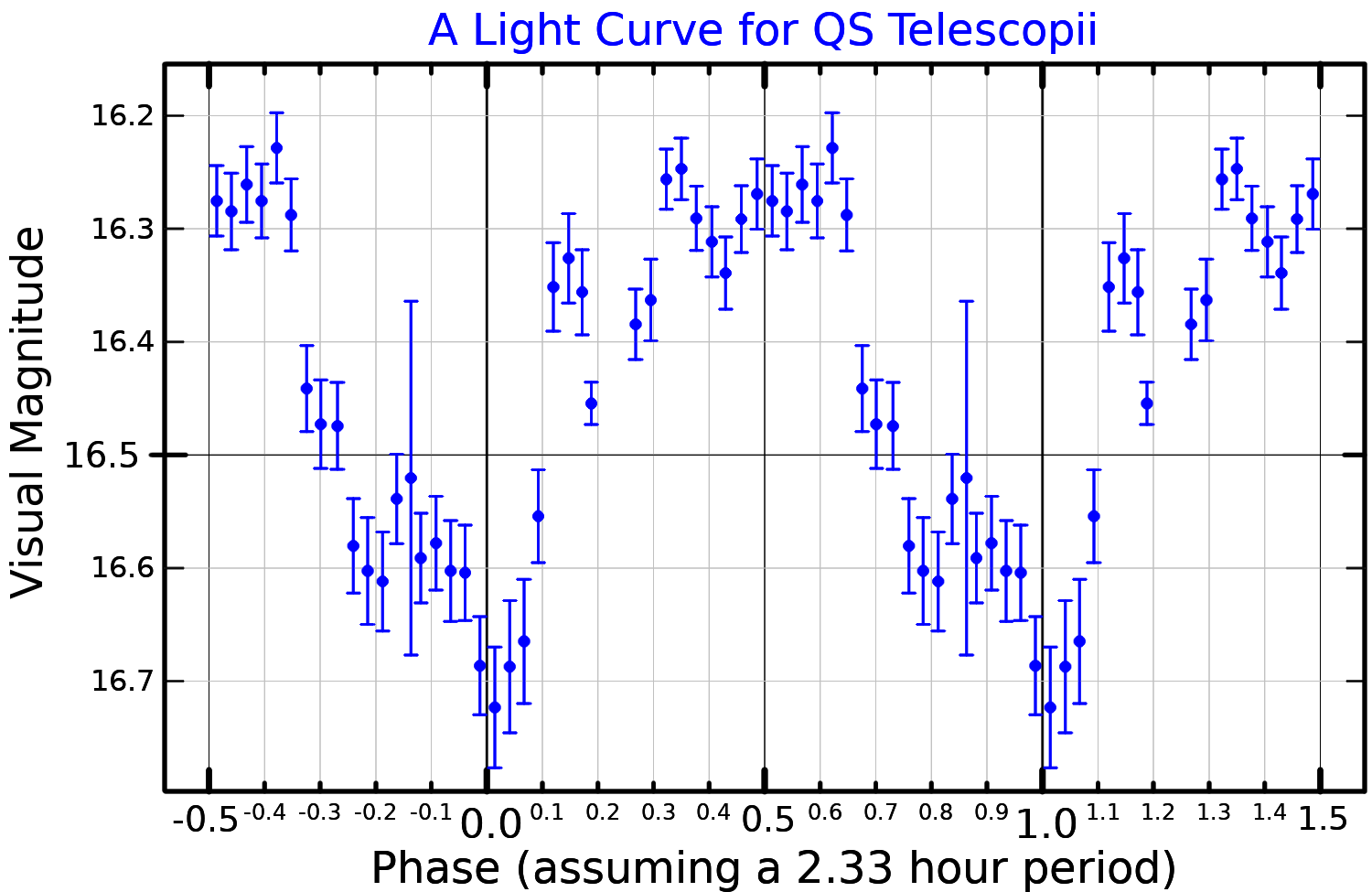
- A visual band light curve for QS Telescopii, adapted from Rosen et al. (1996)

Observation data Epoch J2000.0 Equinox J2000.0
- Constellation: Telescopium
- Right ascension: 19^{h} 38^{m} 35.816^{s}
- Declination: −46° 12′ 57.11″

Characteristics
- Spectral type: M4.5±0.5
- Variable type: AM Her

Astrometry
Radial velocity (R_{v})	110 km/s
Proper motion (μ)	RA: +35.150 mas/yr Dec.: −25.496 mas/yr
Parallax (π)	5.3378±0.0834 mas
Distance	611 ± 10 ly (187 ± 3 pc)

Orbit
Period (P)	2.33 h
Eccentricity (e)	0.0

Details

White Dwarf
Mass	0.71 M_{☉}
Temperature	17,500 K

Other designations
- QS Tel, EUVE J1938-46.2, RE 1938-461, AAVSO 1931-46

Database references
SIMBAD	data

QS Telescopii is a faint, well-studied binary star system in the southern constellation Telescopium. It is composed of a white dwarf and main sequence donor star, locked into a close, circular orbit facing one another. Known as polars, material from the donor star does not form an accretion disk around the white dwarf, but rather streams directly onto it. This is due to the presence of the white dwarf's strong magnetic field. The pair undergo frequent shifts between a high and low accretion states, and it shifts between single and double accretion poles. The main pole is partially self-eclipsing.

In 1991, David A. H. Buckley et al. discovered that the object (then called RE 1938-461) is a variable star. It was given its variable star designation, QS Telescopii, in 1995. The pair of stars orbit each other with a period of 2.33 hours in a circular orbit. The donor star is a small red dwarf with an estimated stellar classification of M4−5. The white dwarf primary has 71% of the mass of the Sun and an effective temperature of 17,500 K. It has a magnetic field strength of 50–80 MG. The system is a source for X-ray emission.

== See also ==
- Variable stars
- Polar (cataclysmic variable)
- AM Herculis
