= Symbiotic nova =

Slow irregular eruptive variable stars

Symbiotic novae are slow irregular eruptive variable stars with very slow nova-like outbursts with an amplitude of between 9 and 11 magnitudes. The symbiotic nova remains at maximum for one or a few decades, and then declines towards its original luminosity. Variables of this type are double star systems with one red giant, which probably is a Mira variable, and one a hot compact object (usually a white dwarf), with markedly contrasting spectra and whose proximity and mass characteristics indicate it as a symbiotic star. They are divided into D-type (dusty) or S-type (stellar), depending on whether the giant is a Mira variable or not.

The red giant fills its Roche lobe so that matter is transferred to the white dwarf and accumulates until a nova-like outburst occurs, caused by ignition of thermonuclear fusion. The temperature at maximum is estimated to rise up to 200,000 K, similar to the energy source of novae, but dissimilar to the dwarf novae. The slow luminosity increase would then be simply due to time needed for growth of the ionization front in the outburst.

It is believed that the white dwarf component of a symbiotic nova remains below the Chandrasekhar limit, so that it remains a white dwarf after its outburst.

One example of a symbiotic nova is V1016 Cygni, whose outburst in 1971–2007 clearly indicated a thermonuclear explosion. Other examples are HM Sagittae and RR Telescopii.

== See also ==
- Dwarf nova – Cataclysmic variable star, consisting of a close binary star system
- Nova – Nuclear explosion in a white dwarf star
- Supernova – Astrophysical phenomenon
