= Zeta Telescopii =

Second-brightest star in the constellation Telescopum

- Location of ζ Telescopii (circled in red)

Observation data Epoch J2000.0 Equinox J2000.0 (ICRS)
- Constellation: Telescopium
- Right ascension: 18^{h} 28^{m} 49.85937^{s}
- Declination: −49° 04′ 14.1180″
- Apparent magnitude (V): +4.13

Characteristics
- Evolutionary stage: red clump
- Spectral type: K1 III-IV
- U−B color index: +0.82
- B−V color index: +1.02

Astrometry
Radial velocity (R_{v})	−29.75±0.19 km/s
Proper motion (μ)	RA: +139.344 mas/yr Dec.: −229.844 mas/yr
Parallax (π)	26.6984±0.1406 mas
Distance	122.2 ± 0.6 ly (37.5 ± 0.2 pc)
Absolute magnitude (M_{V})	1.27±0.03

Details
Mass	1.41±0.07 M_{☉}
Radius	8.27±0.15 R_{☉}
Luminosity	33.30±0.85 L_{☉}
Surface gravity (log g)	2.84±0.077 cgs
Temperature	4,824±31 K
Metallicity [Fe/H]	−0.126±0.022 dex

Other designations
- ζ Tel, CD−49°12153, HD 169767, HIP 90568, HR 6905, SAO 229047

Database references
SIMBAD	data

Zeta Telescopii (ζ Telescopii) is the second-brightest star in the southern constellation of Telescopium. It is a solitary, orange-hued star that is visible to the naked eye with an apparent visual magnitude of +4.13. Based upon an annual parallax shift of 26.7 mas as seen from Earth, it is located around 122 light years from the Sun.

This is a red clump giant star of spectral type K1 III-IV. It is just 40% more massive than the Sun, but has a radius eight times larger and shines with about 30 times its luminosity. The surface of Zeta Telescopii has an effective temperature of 4,824 K, giving it the orange hue typical of K-type stars.
