= Alpha Telescopii =

Star in the constellation Telescopium

α Telescopii
- Location of α Telescopii (circled)

Observation data Epoch J2000 Equinox ICRS
- Constellation: Telescopium
- Right ascension: 18^{h} 26^{m} 58.41604^{s}
- Declination: −45° 58′ 06.4498″
- Apparent magnitude (V): 3.51

Characteristics
- Spectral type: B3 IV
- U−B color index: −0.64
- B−V color index: −0.17
- Variable type: SPB

Astrometry
Radial velocity (R_{v})	−0.2 km/s
Proper motion (μ)	RA: −16.95 mas/yr Dec.: −53.09 mas/yr
Parallax (π)	11.74±0.17 mas
Distance	278 ± 4 ly (85 ± 1 pc)
Absolute magnitude (M_{V})	−1.25

Details
Mass	5.2±0.4 M_{☉}
Radius	3.3±0.5 R_{☉}
Luminosity	794 L_{☉}
Surface gravity (log g)	4.12±0.20 cgs
Temperature	16,700±800 K
Rotational velocity (v sin i)	14±8 km/s
Age	24.1±7.5 Myr

Other designations
- α Tel, CD−46°12379, FK5 691, HD 169467, HIP 90422, HR 6897, SAO 229023

Database references
SIMBAD	data

Alpha Telescopii, Latinized from α Telescopii, is the brightest star in the southern constellation of Telescopium, with an apparent visual magnitude of 3.5. The ancient Roman astronomer Ptolemy included it in the constellation Corona Australis, but it was moved to Telescopium when that constellation was created by French astronomer Nicolas Louis de Lacaille in the 18th century. Parallax measurements put it at a distance of 278 light-years (85 parsecs) from Earth. At that range, the visual magnitude of the star is diminished by an extinction of 0.22 due to interstellar dust.

== Properties ==
=== Physical characteristics ===
This star is much larger than the Sun, with an estimated 5.2±0.4 times the mass and 3.3±0.5 times the radius. The spectrum of the star matches a stellar classification of B3 IV, where the luminosity class of 'IV' indicates this is a subgiant star that has nearly exhausted the supply of hydrogen at its core and is evolving away from the main sequence. Alpha Telescopii is a bright star that is radiating nearly 800 times the Sun's luminosity. This energy is being emitted from the star's outer envelope at an effective temperature of around 16,700 K, giving it the characteristic blue-white hue of a B-type star.

=== Variability ===
This is possibly a type of variable star known as a slowly pulsating B-type star. It has a longitudinal magnetic field with a mean strength of –233 ± 43 G. A projected stellar rotation velocity of about 14 km s^{−1} is considered low for a star of this type, which may indicate it is being viewed from nearly pole-on.
