= Theta Arae =

Star in the constellation Ara

- The location of θ Arae (circled)

Observation data Epoch J2000 Equinox J2000
- Constellation: Ara
- Right ascension: 18^{h} 06^{m} 37.871^{s}
- Declination: −50° 05′ 29.31″
- Apparent magnitude (V): +3.67

Characteristics
- Spectral type: B2 Ib
- U−B color index: −0.870
- B−V color index: −0.109

Astrometry
Radial velocity (R_{v})	+3.4 km/s
Proper motion (μ)	RA: −8.27 mas/yr Dec.: −8.70 mas/yr
Parallax (π)	4.01±0.15 mas
Distance	810 ± 30 ly (249 ± 9 pc)
Absolute magnitude (M_{V})	−3.33

Details
Mass	8.9±0.1 M_{☉}
Radius	20.1 R_{☉}
Luminosity	3,450 L_{☉}
Surface gravity (log g)	2.70 cgs
Temperature	17,231±231 K
Rotational velocity (v sin i)	95 km/s
Age	28.2±4.7 Myr

Other designations
- θ Ara, CD−50°11720, FK5 1471, GC 24635, HD 165024, HIP 88714, HR 6743, SAO 245242, PPM 346577

Database references
SIMBAD	data

Theta Arae is a star in the southern constellation Ara. Its name is a Bayer designation that is Latinized from θ Arae, and abbreviated Theta Ara or θ Ara. This star has an apparent visual magnitude of +3.67, which is bright enough to be seen with the naked eye. Based upon an annual parallax shift of 4.01 mas, Theta Arae is 810 light-years (250 parsecs) distant from the Earth.

This is a supergiant star with a stellar classification of B2 Ib. At an age of 28 million years, it has a high rate of spin with a projected rotational velocity of 95 km/s. This star has nearly nine times the mass of the Sun and over 20 times the Sun's radius. The outer atmosphere of this star has an effective temperature of 17,231 K; much hotter than the surface of the Sun. At this heat, the star shines with the characteristic blue-white hue of a B-type star.
