= Stars named after people =

Over the past few centuries, a small number of stars have been named after individual people. It is common in astronomy for objects to be given names, in accordance with accepted astronomical naming conventions. Most stars have not been given proper names, relying instead on alphanumeric designations in star catalogues. However, a few hundred had either long-standing traditional names (usually from the Arabic) or historic names from frequent usage.

In addition, many stars have catalogue designations that contain the name of their compiler or discoverer. This includes Gliese, Wolf, Ross, Bradley, Piazzi, Lacaille, Struve, Groombridge, Lalande, Krueger, Mayer, Weisse, Gould, Luyten and others. For example, Wolf 359 was discovered and catalogued by Max Wolf. Some binary stars are named after their discoverers, such as Delorme 1 and Luhman 16.

Various private organizations claim to name stars in honor of people in exchange for a fee, but these names are used only within their own publications, and are not recognized by the scientific community.

== Names approved by the IAU ==
The International Astronomical Union (IAU) is widely recognized by scientists and governments as the world authority for names of astronomical bodies, and lays down strict standards for this naming.

In July 2014 the IAU launched NameExoWorlds, a process for giving proper names to exoplanets and their host stars, the outcome of which was announced in December 2015. As a result, the IAU approved two star names after individuals:

- Cervantes for the star Mu Arae honoring the writer Miguel de Cervantes
- Copernicus for the star 55 Cancri A honoring the astronomer Nicolaus Copernicus

In 2016, the IAU organized a Working Group on Star Names (WGSN) which will catalog cultural and historical names for bright stars to help preserve astronomical world heritage, and maintain a catalog of IAU-approved unique proper names for stars. The WGSN's first bulletin of July 2016 set out its terms of reference and naming guidelines. All approved names are included in the current IAU Catalog of Star Names. The WGSN rules generally discouraged the naming of stars after people, but confirmed the names Cervantes and Copernicus as well as five others:

- Barnard's Star, the fourth-closest star to the Solar System, named after the American astronomer E. E. Barnard who discovered it has the highest known proper motion of any star.
- Cor Caroli (Latin for 'heart of Charles') for the star Alpha Canum Venaticorum, so named in honour of King Charles I of England by Sir Charles Scarborough, his physician.
- Fuyue for G Scorpii, a traditional Chinese name honoring Fu Yue.
- Sualocin and Rotanev for components of Alpha and Beta Delphini, two stars which appeared in the Palermo star catalogue of 1814. They were eventually identified as the reversed spelling of Nicolaus Venator, a Latinised version of Nicolò Cacciatore, assistant to the astronomer Giuseppe Piazzi. It is not clear whether Piazzi intended to name the stars after his assistant, or if Cacciatore made the names up himself.

In 2019, the IAU held a second NameExoWorlds campaign to celebrate the 100th anniversary of the IAU's founding. Four of the approved star names refer to real people:

- Austria named the star HAT-P-14 as Franz (Franz Joseph I of Austria, by way of his portrayal in the movie Sissi).
- Azerbaijan named the star HD 152581 (16h 53m 44s / +11° 58′ 25″, in Ophiuchus) as Mahsati (Mahsati).
- Cuba named the star BD−17 63 as Felixvarela (Félix Varela).
- Spain named the star HD 149143 as Rosalíadecastro (Rosalía de Castro).

In the 2020s the IAU has further discouraged naming stars after people, with the 2022 NameExoWorlds campaign banning names of real people. Nevertheless, two additional star names referring to historical people have been approved:

- Antinous for Theta Aquilae after Antinous, by way of the obsolete constellation of the same name.
- Stella Ludoviciana (also written Sidus Ludovicianum), an 8th-magnitude star in the asterism of the Big Dipper in the constellation Ursa Major, halfway between Mizar and Alcor. It was discovered on 2 December 1722 by Johann Georg Liebknecht, who mistook it for a planet and named it after Louis V, Landgrave of Hesse-Darmstadt.

== Names not approved by the IAU ==
Apart from the few formally approved by the IAU, and leaving aside commercial attempts, stars named after individuals fall broadly into two groups. The first group are those named openly for an individual connected with them in some way. The second, somewhat more obscurely, are those named after an individual but without explicitly making this clear.

=== Openly named stars ===
There is a growing number of stars whose common names honour individuals. Many of these were highly significant in some way when discovered, usually through having some unusual characteristic. The best source to get these names is Sky Catalogue 2000.0, Volume 2 (Double Stars, Variable Stars, and Nonstellar Objects), in the chapter Glossary Of Selected Astronomical Names.

- Abt's Star is SV Crateris (ADS 8115/HD 98088/β 600) in Crater. Named after Helmut Abt.
- Andrews' Star is a suspected variable star in Auriga (HD 37519 / SAO 58319 / HR 1938). Named after A. David Andrews.
- Anthelm's Nova/Star is Nova 1670 Vulpeculae, observed by Anthelme Voituret (aka père Anthelme / don Anthelme).
- Argelander's Star is Groombridge 1830, a high proper motion star. Named for Friedrich Wilhelm Argelander, who discovered its high proper motion in 1842.
- Argelander's Second Star is Lalande 21185, a nearby red dwarf star. Named also for Argelander, who discovered its high proper motion in 1857.
- Argelander's Third Star is Gliese 412, also known as Lalande 21258, a nearby binary pair of red dwarf stars. Also named for Argelander, who discovered its apparent high proper motion in 1860.
- Baade's Star is the pulsar in the Crab Nebula (Messier 1, Taurus). Also known as the Crab Pulsar, or PSR B0531+21. Named after Walter Baade.
- Babcock's Star or Babcock's Magnetic Star is HD 215441 in Lacerta. Named after Horace W. Babcock.
- Baxendell's possible Nova (Nova Bootis 1860, T Bootis), discovered by Joseph Baxendell in April 1860.
- The Becklin–Neugebauer Object, sometimes called Becklin's Star, is an infrared source, possibly a protostar, in the Orion molecular cloud complex. Named after Eric Becklin and Gerry Neugebauer.
- Bennett's Supernova (SN1968L in Messier 83) discovered by John Caister Bennett on 16 July 1968.
- Bessel's Star is 61 Cygni, for a short time the nearest star whose distance was accurately known (measured by Friedrich Bessel in 1838). Also called Piazzi's Flying Star, since Giuseppe Piazzi nominated it as a good candidate for distance measurements (parallaxes).
- Bidelman's helium variable star is V761 Centauri (HD 125823). Named after William P. Bidelman.
- Bidelman's peculiar star is KS Persei (HD 30353), a PV Telescopii variable.
- Bidelman's high-latitude Be star is HD 127617 in Bootes.
- Bond's Flare Star is AF Piscium in Pisces, named after H. E. Bond.
- Borrelly's Star is probably S Ceti (0h 23.8m / -9° 28'). Named after Alphonse Borrelly.
- Boyajian's Star (or Tabby's Star) is KIC 8462852, an F-type main-sequence star with a highly unusual light curve in the constellation of Cygnus, named after Tabetha S. Boyajian; its peculiar characteristics engendered speculation that a Dyson sphere of an extraterrestrial civilization had been discovered.
- Branchett's Object (Star) is a possible nova in Scutum (1981).
- The Brendan Downs Supernova is SN 1997de, in Pavo (in galaxy NGC 6769).
- Brewer's Star is HD 50169 (a magnetic star) in Monoceros. Named after K. R. W. Brewer.
- Butler's Star is BT Tucanae / HD 6090 (a flare star at 1:00:18 / -72°44'35" in the Small Magellanic Cloud). Named after C. J. Butler.
- Caffau's Star is an ultra-metal-poor halo star named after the astronomer Elisabetta Caffau.
- Campbell's Star is HD 184738, which is the nucleus of planetary nebula PK 64 + 5.1, in Cygnus. Named after William Wallace Campbell.
- Cayrel's Star is an ultra-metal-poor halo star named after the French astronomer Roger Cayrel.
- Chanal's Object is V1118 Orionis (NSV 2229), a variable star in Orion. Named after Roger Chanal.
- Chavira's Supernova is SN 1965H in NGC 4666 (in Virgo). Named after E. Chavira.
- Chevremont's Star is a variable star in globular cluster Messier 2, in Aquarius.
- Chuadze's Supernova is SN 1967C in NGC 3389 (in Leo). Named after A. D. Chuadze.
- Chu's Object (Star?) in Perseus, named after You-Hua Chu.
- The Cohen–Schwartz Star is a T Tauri star and infrared source in Orion. Named after M. Cohen and R. D. Schwartz.
- Eggen's Nearby Star is CoD -31°622 in Sculptor. Briefly thought to be near the Solar System but later found not to be. Named after Olin J. Eggen.
- Fehrenbach's Star is HD 116745 in globular cluster Omega Centauri. Named after Charles Fehrenbach.
- Herschel's Garnet Star is Mu Cephei, a red supergiant particularly remarkable for its deep red color, first described by William Herschel. The IAU-approved name for this star is Garnet Star, without reference to Herschel.
- Herschel's Wonder Star is Beta Monocerotis.
- Hind's Crimson Star is R Leporis, a long-period variable star, named after the discoverer John Russell Hind. It is one of the reddest stars visible (a typical Cool Carbon Star, CCS).
- Hind's New Star is V841 Ophiuchi, or Nova Ophiuchi 1848.
- Hoffmeister's Star is V442 Cassiopeiae (aka Sonneberg 9484). Named after Cuno Hoffmeister.
- Honda's Variable Star is a long-period variable star (not a nova) in Cygnus
- The Hulse–Taylor binary is PSR B1913+16 (a binary pulsar) in Aquila. Named after Russell Alan Hulse and Joseph Hooton Taylor Jr. This discovery won them the Nobel Prize in Physics in 1993.
- Huruhata's Object is an eclipsing binary in Canis Minor. Named after Masaaki Huruhata.
- Huruhata's Variable is the WZ Sagittae type dwarf nova EG Cancri.
- Huth's "moving star" of 1801-2, discovered and observed by Hofrath Huth at Frankfurt an der Oder. Huth's "moving star" appeared in the constellation Leo.
- Innes' star, better known as LHS 40, is a high proper-motion star named after Robert T. A. Innes, the discoverer of Proxima Centauri. In 1930 Luyten listed this as the fifth-closest star system, but his belief was mistaken as it turned out to be 41 light-years away.
- Kapteyn's Star, a subdwarf, was discovered in 1897 by Jacobus Kapteyn, the star with the highest known proper motion at the time of its discovery and is a halo star.
- Kepler's Star, name given to the supernova later designated SN 1604 when first observed, after Johannes Kepler, who studied it extensively though he did not have priority of discovery.
- Klemola's Star is BD +10°2179 (SAO 99230) in Leo.
- Koiki is HD 106068, a star within the Southern Cross constellation, named after Indigenous Australian land rights campaigner Eddie Koiki Mabo on 3 June 2015, the 23rd anniversary of the Mabo decision, which overturned the notion of terra nullius in Australia. It was named by Museum of Applied Arts and Sciences in Sydney. The star also falls within the larger Torres Strait Islanders' constellation known as Tagai, which is very culturally significant and used for nautical navigation.
- Krzeminski's Star is a blue supergiant, part of the pulsar Centaurus X-3, discovered by the Polish astronomer Wojciech Krzemiński in 1974.
- Kurtz's Light Variable Star is HD 188136 in Octans.
- Kuwano's Object/Star has been used to refer to the nova-like object PU Vulpeculae. The names "Kuwano's Object" and "Kuwano's Star" have also been used to refer to V1407 Aquilae and V4021 Sagittarii, respectively. These are all named after Yoshiyuki Kuwano.
- Lamont's Star is a peculiar star near the nucleus of the Andromeda Galaxy (Messier 31).
- Latham's planet is the small red dwarf star or massive brown dwarf HD 114762 b in Coma Berenices, unofficially named Latham's planet after its discoverer David Latham (1989).
- Liller's Star is a star near Centaurus X-3. Named after William Liller.
- Lovas's Supernova is SN 1964E in MCG 9-20-51 (in Ursa Major). Named after Miklós Lovas.
- Luyten's Star, another red dwarf, is named after Willem Jacob Luyten, its discoverer.
- Luyten's Flare Star is a nearby UV Ceti variable (L 726-8).
- Merrill's Star is the high-velocity Wolf–Rayet star WR 124, at the nucleus of the ejecta nebula PK 50+3 1 in Sagitta (which it created). Named after Paul W. Merrill.
- Olbers' Star is a peculiar star in Virgo, at 13:14.1 / -16°33' (mentioned in the Deep-Sky Name Index 2000.0 by Hugh C. Maddocks) (Foxon-Maddocks Associates). Named after Heinrich Wilhelm Matthias Olbers. As seen from Earth, this star's location is very near galaxy NGC 5030.
- Oosterhoff's Star (also designated H Per 1166 and WD 0214+568) is a white dwarf named after Pieter Oosterhoff, who discovered its white dwarf nature in 1930.
- Osawa's Star is V436 Cassiopeiae (HD 221568). Named after Kiyoteru Osawa.
- Pearce's Star is AO Cassiopeiae. Named after Joseph Algernon Pearce.
- Persson's Star is V733 Cephei, an FU Orionis type object. Named after R. Persson.
- Piazzi's Flying Star, see Bessel's Star.
- Plaskett's Star (also designated HR 2422) is one of the most massive binary stars known, with a total mass of about one hundred times that of the Sun. It is named after John Stanley Plaskett, the Canadian astronomer who discovered its binary nature in 1922.
- Popper's Star is HD 124448, an extreme helium star in Centaurus. Named after Daniel M. Popper.
- Przybylski's Star (also designated HD 101065) is a star that shows unusually high abundance of lanthanide elements in its spectral lines, named for Antoni Przybylski.
- Ptolemy's Cluster is the open star cluster Messier 7 (NGC 6475) in Scorpius. Named after Ptolemy.
- The Roberts–Altizer Variable Star is a galactic U Geminorum star near NGC 3147, in Draco.
- Romano's Star (also designated GR 290) is a luminous blue variable in the Triangulum Galaxy, named after its discoverer Giuliano Romano.
- Rosino's Supernova is a supernova that was discovered by Leonida Rosino in 1965, near NGC 4753.
- The Rosino–Zwicky Object (Star) is a variable star near Messier 88 in Coma Berenices. Named after Rosino and Fritz Zwicky.
- Sakurai's Object (also designated V4334 Sgr) is an unusual red giant, named after Yukio Sakurai.
- Sanduleak's Star is a possible symbiotic star in the Large Magellanic Cloud (LMC). Named after Nicholas Sanduleak.
- The Sanduleak–Pesch Binary Star is a white dwarf binary in Hercules. Named after Sanduleak and Peter Pesch.
- The Sanduleak–Stephenson Star/Object is also known as Sanduleak-Stephenson 433, SS 433 in Aquila, a neutron star in radio source W50. Named after Sanduleak and Charles Bruce Stephenson.
- Schaeberle's Flaming Star is the source of the Flaming Star Nebula IC 405 (aka Cederblad 42) in Auriga, AE Aurigae. Named after John Martin Schaeberle.
- Scheiner's Star is BD +15°2083 (HD 83225) in Leo. Named after Julius Scheiner.
- Scholz's Star is a late-M dwarf + T-type brown dwarf (M9.5 + T5) system, discovered in 2013 by Ralf-Dieter Scholz. It has large parallax, but relatively small proper motion, and it is known for its close flyby to the Sun about 70,000 years ago.
- The Schweizer–Middleditch Star is a star near the center of SN 1006 in Centaurus. Named after Francois Schweizer and John Middleditch.
- Sneden's Star is a giant star, named after Chris Sneden. The star is known for its high-resolution spectroscopic observations.
- SN Refsdal is the first detected multiply-lensed supernova.
- Stepanian's Star is LX Serpentis, a 14th magnitude flare star (?). Named after Jivan A. Stepanian.
- Sugano's Star is a variable star in Orion, either V369 or V1143 Orionis.
- Tabby's Star, see Boyajian's Star.
- Teegarden's Star, a nearby star discovered in 2003 in archived data taken years earlier for NASA's Near Earth Asteroid Tracking program. The star is named in honor of Bonnard J. Teegarden, the NASA astrophysicist that led the discovery team.
- Tombaugh's Star is TV Corvi. Named after Clyde Tombaugh.
- Tycho's Star, name given to the supernova later designated SN 1572, after Tycho Brahe, though he did not have priority of discovery.
- Van Biesbroeck's Star is VB 10, a very small, faint, red dwarf named after George Van Biesbroeck, who discovered it in 1944 – the smallest and faintest star then known.
- Van Maanen's Star is a white dwarf, discovered in 1917 by Adriaan van Maanen, only the second white dwarf discovered.
- Wachmann's Flare Star is V371 Orionis. Named after Arno Arthur Wachmann.
- Walborn's Star is the Wolf–Rayet star BAT99-6 in the Large Magellanic Cloud (LMC) in Dorado. Named after Nolan R. Walborn. It was found to be a binary between a slash star and an O-type main sequence star.
- Warren and Penfold's (WP) Star is the optical counterpart of LMC X-3 in the Large Magellanic Cloud. Named after P. R. Warren and J. E. Penfold.
- Weaver's Star is SS 38, the third discovered symbiotic star with a carbon star as the cool component. Named after Wm. Bruce Weaver who first identified it as a symbiotic star in 1972.
- Welch's Red Variable is BH Crucis, named after its discoverer Ronald G. Welch.
- Wild's Supernova is SN 1966J in NGC 3198 (in Ursa Major). Named after Paul Wild.
- Wischnjewsky's Supernova in Fornax A. Named after Marina Wischnjewsky.
- The Zealey–Lee Supernova in the nucleus of an anonymous galaxy in Grus. Named after W. Zealey and S. Lee.

(Note that Pandora's Star and Ratner's Star are the names of novels, not actual stars.)

=== Covertly named stars ===
This star chart used on the Apollo 14 mission includes the names Navi, Dnoces and Regor

Some stars were given names that were disguised names of individuals, which subsequently appeared in star catalogues and thus entered into more general usage.

The earliest noted example was Sualocin and Rotanev, which names have now been approved by the IAU WGSN (see above). More recently, during the Apollo program, it was common for astronauts to be trained in celestial navigation, and to use a list of naked-eye stars which to take bearings. Three of these stars were named in 1967 in honor of the Apollo 1 crew, who had died in the Apollo 1 fire earlier that year, by their backup crew (the Apollo 9 crew) and Dr. Clarence Cleminshaw of the Griffith Observatory. It has often been incorrectly claimed that Gus Grissom himself named these stars as a private joke.

- Navi for the star Gamma Cassiopeiae, which is Ivan spelled backwards, the middle name of Virgil Ivan "Gus" Grissom.
- Dnoces for the star Iota Ursae Majoris, which is Second spelled backwards, alluding to Edward Higgins White, II.
- Regor for the star Gamma Velorum, which is Roger spelled backwards, the first name of Roger Bruce Chaffee.

The name Tyl for Epsilon Draconis, appearing in Antonín Bečvář's Skalnate Pleso Atlas of the Heavens, has an unknown etymology. It may have been covertly named by Bečvář after Czech writer Josef Kajetán Tyl.

=== Commercial naming ===
As early as 1979, when the International Star Registry was formed, private companies have attempted to sell the right to unofficially name stars. These companies have no legal standing to assign any star a name, and as such these names are never recognized by the astronomical or scientific communities. The IAU does not recognize this practice, and on its website describes it as "charlatanry".

== See also ==
- IAU Working Group on Star Names
- List of astronomical objects named after people
- List of minor planets named after people
- List of people with craters of the Moon named after them
- NameExoWorlds
- Stellar designations and names
