= UX Antliae =

Star in the constellation Antlia

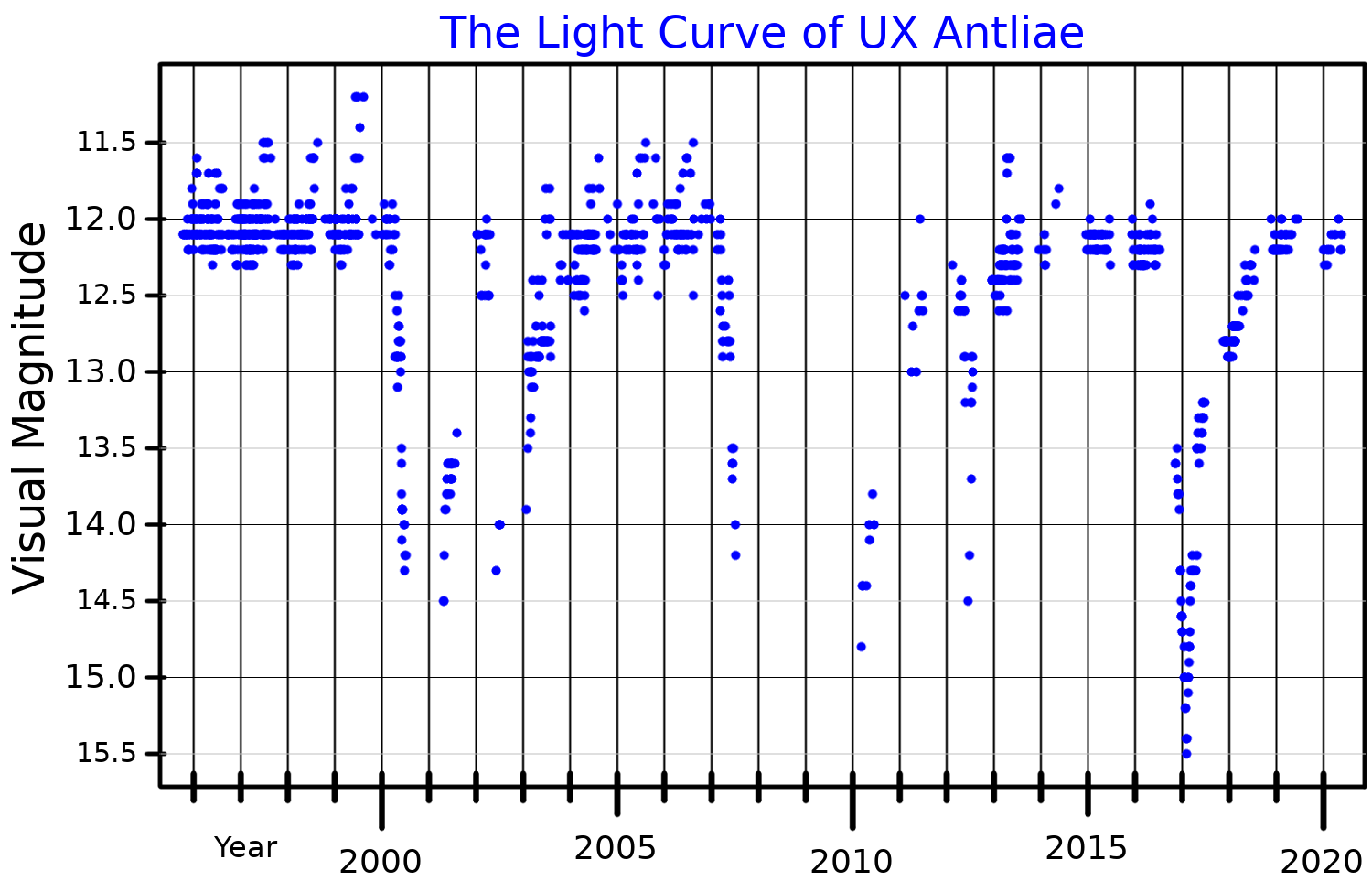
- The visual band light curve of UX Antliae, from AAVSO data

Observation data Epoch J2000.0 Equinox J2000.0
- Constellation: Antlia
- Right ascension: 10^{h} 57^{m} 09.059^{s}
- Declination: −37° 23′ 55.13″
- Apparent magnitude (V): 11.85 - 18.0

Characteristics
- Spectral type: C(F)
- Variable type: R CrB

Astrometry
Radial velocity (R_{v})	27.83 km/s
Proper motion (μ)	RA: −2,012 mas/yr Dec.: +0.487 mas/yr
Parallax (π)	0.0445±0.0197 mas
Distance	approx. 70,000 ly (approx. 22,000 pc)
Absolute magnitude (M_{V})	~−5

Details
Mass	0.722 M_{☉}
Surface gravity (log g)	0.5 cgs
Temperature	7,000 K

Other designations
- 2MASS J10570905-3723550, TYC 7212-77-1, HV 10108, DENIS-P J105709.0-372354, GSC 07212-00077, GSC2 S1303203939, AAVSO 1052-36

Database references
SIMBAD	data

UX Antliae is a post-AGB and R Coronae Borealis variable star that has a base apparent magnitude of around 11.85, with irregular dimmings down to below magnitude 18.0.

Researchers David Kilkenny and J.E. Westerhuys of the South African Astronomical Observatory confirmed that UX Antliae was an R Coronae Borealis variable in 1990 after noting the similarity of its spectrum to the RCB star W Mensae. It had been suspected of being one since 1940, but had been little-studied and exhibited no characteristic declines between 1975 and 1990.

Assuming that its absolute magnitude is around -5, it has been estimated as lying 25000 parsecs distant from Earth. Kilkenny and Westerhuys noted that its spectrum fit with that of a star of spectral class F, although was deficient in hydrogen. It has around 70% the mass of the Sun and an effective (surface) temperature of around 7000 K.

== See also ==
- R Coronae Borealis
