= Hydrogen-deficient star =

Star that has little or no hydrogen in its atmosphere

About 25% of post-AGB hydrogen-deficient stars experience a born-again phase, where they migrate over time between post-AGB and AGB regions in a Hertzsprung–Russell diagram.

A hydrogen-deficient star is a type of star that has little or no hydrogen in its atmosphere. Hydrogen deficiency is unusual in a star, as hydrogen is typically the most common element in a stellar atmosphere. Despite being rare, there are a variety of star types that display a hydrogen deficiency.

== Observational history ==
Hydrogen-deficient stars had been noted prior to the discovery of their hydrogen deficiency. In 1797, Edward Pigott noted the profound variation in stellar magnitude of R Coronae Borealis (R CrB). In 1867, Charles Wolf and Georges Rayet discovered unusual emission line structure in Wolf–Rayet stars.

Hydrogen deficiency in a star was first discovered in 1891 by Williamina Fleming, where she stated “the spectrum of υ Sgr is remarkable since the hydrogen lines are very faint and of the same intensity as the additional dark lines”. In 1906, Hans Ludendorff found that Hγ Balmer spectral lines were absent in R CrB.

It was widely believed at the time that all stellar atmospheres contain hydrogen, so these observations were discounted. Not until quantitative spectral measurements became available in 1935-1940 did astronomers begin to accept that stars such as R CrB and υ Sgr were hydrogen deficient. As of 1970, relatively few of these stars were known. Large-scale stellar surveys since then have greatly increased the number and variety of known hydrogen-deficient stars. As of 2008, about 2,000 hydrogen-deficient stars were known.

== Classification ==
Despite being relatively rare, there are many different types of hydrogen-deficient stars. They can be grouped into five general classes: massive or upper-main-sequence stars, low-mass supergiants, hot subdwarf stars, central stars of planetary nebulae, and white dwarfs. There have been other classification schemes, such as one based on carbon content.

=== Massive stars ===
Wolf-Rayet stars show bright bands in continuous spectra that come from ionized atoms such as helium. Although there was some controversy, these were accepted as hydrogen-deficient stars in the 1980s. Helium-rich B stars, such as σ Orionis E, are chemically unusual spectral B or OB main sequence stars that show strong neutral helium lines. Hydrogen-deficient binaries, such as υ Sgr, have helium lines on a metallic spectrum and show large radial velocities that are thought to result from Population I stars orbiting the Galactic Center. Type Ib and Ic supernovae show no hydrogen absorption lines and are associated with stars that have lost their hydrogen envelope through supernova core collapse.

=== Low-mass supergiants ===
This type of hydrogen-deficient star occurs at late stages of stellar evolution. R CrB stars are hydrogen-deficient, carbon-rich stars that are notable for their light variation; they may dim by five stellar magnitudes over a period of days, then recover. These dimming events likely arise from stellar surface dynamics, rather than their exceptional chemical composition. Extreme helium stars have absent hydrogen emission or absorption lines, but have strong neutral helium lines and strong CII and NII lines. Born-again stars are stars that evolve over a period of years to migrate between the post-AGB and AGB regions of the Hertzsprung–Russell diagram. For example, Sakurai’s Object (V4334 Sgr) evolved from a faint blue star in 1994 to a yellow supergiant in 1996. One proposed mechanism for this migration is the final helium flash scenario.

=== Hot subdwarfs ===
He-sdB are subdwarfs with class B spectra with broader than usual H, HeI, and HeII lines. JL 87 in 1991 was the first He-sdB star to be reported. Since then this class of stars has been shown to have a wide range of hydrogen-to-helium ratios. Compact He-sdO stars have class O spectra, are typically nitrogen-rich, and may or may not be carbon-rich. Low-gravity He-sdO stars overlap with their compact cousins, but have lower surface gravity. It is hypothesized that R CrB and extreme Helium stars, if they evolve to become white dwarfs, would become similar to low-gravity He-sdO stars.

=== Central stars of planetary nebulae ===
Central stars of planetary nebulae are typically hot and compact. WC stars are massive Population I stars with broad emission lines for HeI, HeII, CII – CIV, NII, and NIII ions. They have surface temperatures from 14,000K to 270,000K. Of-WR(C) stars have strong carbon emission lines and also show hydrogen deficiency in the inner part of their nebulae. O(He) stars are characterized by HeII absorption while having CIV, NV and OVI emission lines. PG1159 stars, also termed O(C) stars, are dominated by carbon absorption line spectra. They are notable for complex pulsations and being among the hottest known stars.

=== White dwarfs ===
The first hydrogen-deficient white dwarfs were discovered by Milton Humason and Fritz Zwicky in 1947 and Willem Luyten in 1952. These stars had no hydrogen lines, but very strong HeI absorption lines. HZ 43 is such a star; early ultraviolet observations showed a temperature greater than 100,000K, but more recent measurements in far UV show an effective temperature of 50,400K. AM CVn stars are binary pairs of hydrogen-deficient white dwarfs with orbital sizes of only tens of Earth radii.

== Formation and evolution ==
Hydrogen deficiency results from stellar evolution. Over the course of a star's evolution, both the consumption of hydrogen in nuclear fusion and the removal of hydrogen layers by explosive processes can lead to a deficiency of hydrogen in its atmosphere.

Detailed theoretical models are still in their infancy. Modeling of hydrogen-deficient star evolution involves either a single-star approach or a binary-star approach.

For example, there have been two theories put forward to explain the formation of extreme helium stars. The helium final flash scenario is a single-star approach in which a helium flash serves to consume the hydrogen from the outer layer of the star. The double degenerate scenario is a binary-star approach in which a smaller degenerate helium white dwarf and a larger carbon-oxygen white dwarf orbit each other so closely that they eventually inspiral due to gravitational wave losses. At the Roche limit, mass transfer takes place from the helium to the carbon-oxygen star. The latter undergoes helium shell burning to form a supergiant and evolve to a hydrogen-deficient star. The double degenerate scenario provides a better fit to the observational data.

== General references ==
- Jeffery, C. S.; Heber, U.; Hill, P. W.; Dreizler, S.; Drilling, J. S.; Lawson, W. A.; Leuenhagen, U.; Werner, K. (1996). C. S. Jeffery and U. Heber (ed.). A catalogue of hydrogen-deficient stars. Hydrogen deficient stars Astronomical Society of the Pacific Conference Series. Vol. 96. San Francisco: Astronomical Society of the Pacific (ASP). pp. 471–486. Bibcode:1996ASPC...96..471J.
