= U Aquarii =

Star in the constellation of Aquarius

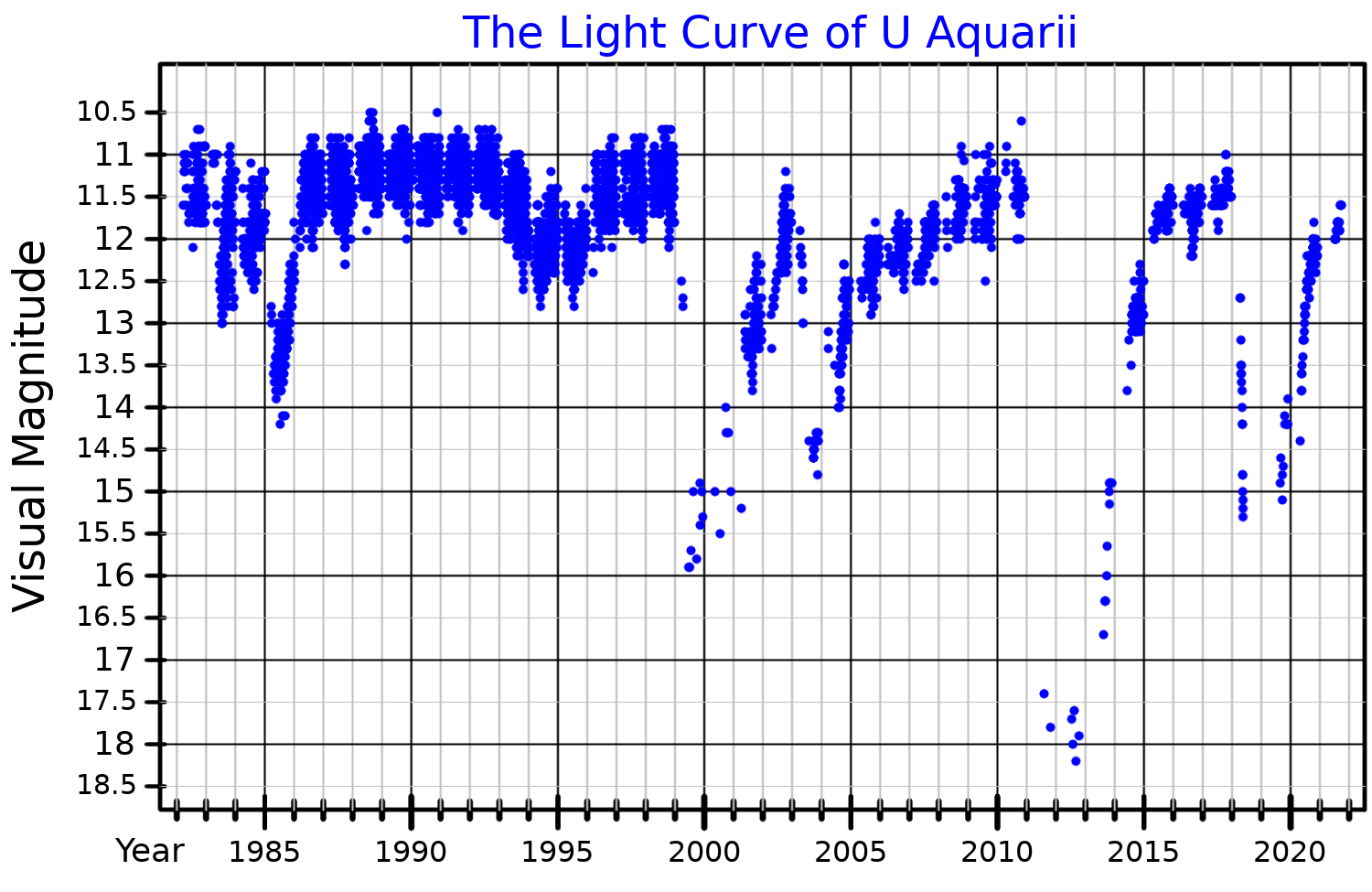
- The visual band light curve of U Aquarii, from AAVSO data

Observation data Epoch J2000.0 Equinox J2000.0 (ICRS)
- Constellation: Aquarius
- Right ascension: 22^{h} 03^{m} 19.69905^{s}
- Declination: −16° 37′ 35.2811″
- Apparent magnitude (V): 10.6 to 15.9

Characteristics
- Spectral type: C-Hd
- U−B color index: 0.07
- B−V color index: 0.66
- Variable type: R CrB

Astrometry
Radial velocity (R_{v})	+89.49±1.54 km/s
Proper motion (μ)	RA: 2.780 mas/yr Dec.: −1.907 mas/yr
Parallax (π)	0.0859±0.0222 mas
Distance	approx. 38,000 ly (approx. 12,000 pc)

Details
Mass	4.5 M_{☉}
Surface gravity (log g)	2.28 cgs
Temperature	5,500 K
Metallicity [Fe/H]	−0.99 dex
Rotational velocity (v sin i)	8.4 km/s

Other designations
- U Aqr, BD−17°6424, HIP 108876, IRAS 22006-1652

Database references
SIMBAD	data

U Aquarii, abbreviated U Aqr, is a variable star in the equatorial constellation of Aquarius. It is invisible to the naked eye, having an apparent visual magnitude that ranges from 10.6 down to as low as 15.9. Based on parallax measurements, the distance to this star is approximately 38 kly (12 kpc). In 1990, W. A. Lawson and associates provided a distance estimate of 43 kly (13.2 kpc) based on the assumption of a bolometric magnitude of −5. It appears to lie several kiloparsecs below the galactic plane, and thus may belong to an old stellar population.

Christian Heinrich Friedrich Peters discovered that U Aquarii is a variable star based on observations made from 1875 to 1878. Its variable star designation was published in Annie Jump Cannon's Second catalogue of variable stars in 1907, at which time the class of variable star it belonged to was still unknown.

The stellar classification of this star is C-Hd, and it is classified as a R Coronae Borealis variable. It is a carbon star with a hydrogen-deficient spectra that also shows evidence of s-process elements, including overabundances of strontium and yttrium, but no barium. This combination of properties is exceptionally rare; only one other example has been found as of 2012. The elemental abundances are explained as the result of a single neutron exposure event, which is difficult to reconcile with a conjecture that this may be a post-AGB-type star. In 1999, U Aqr was proposed to be a Thorne-Zytkow object, instead of being a simple R Coronae Borealis variable.
