= WX Coronae Australis =

Variable star in the constellation Corona Australis

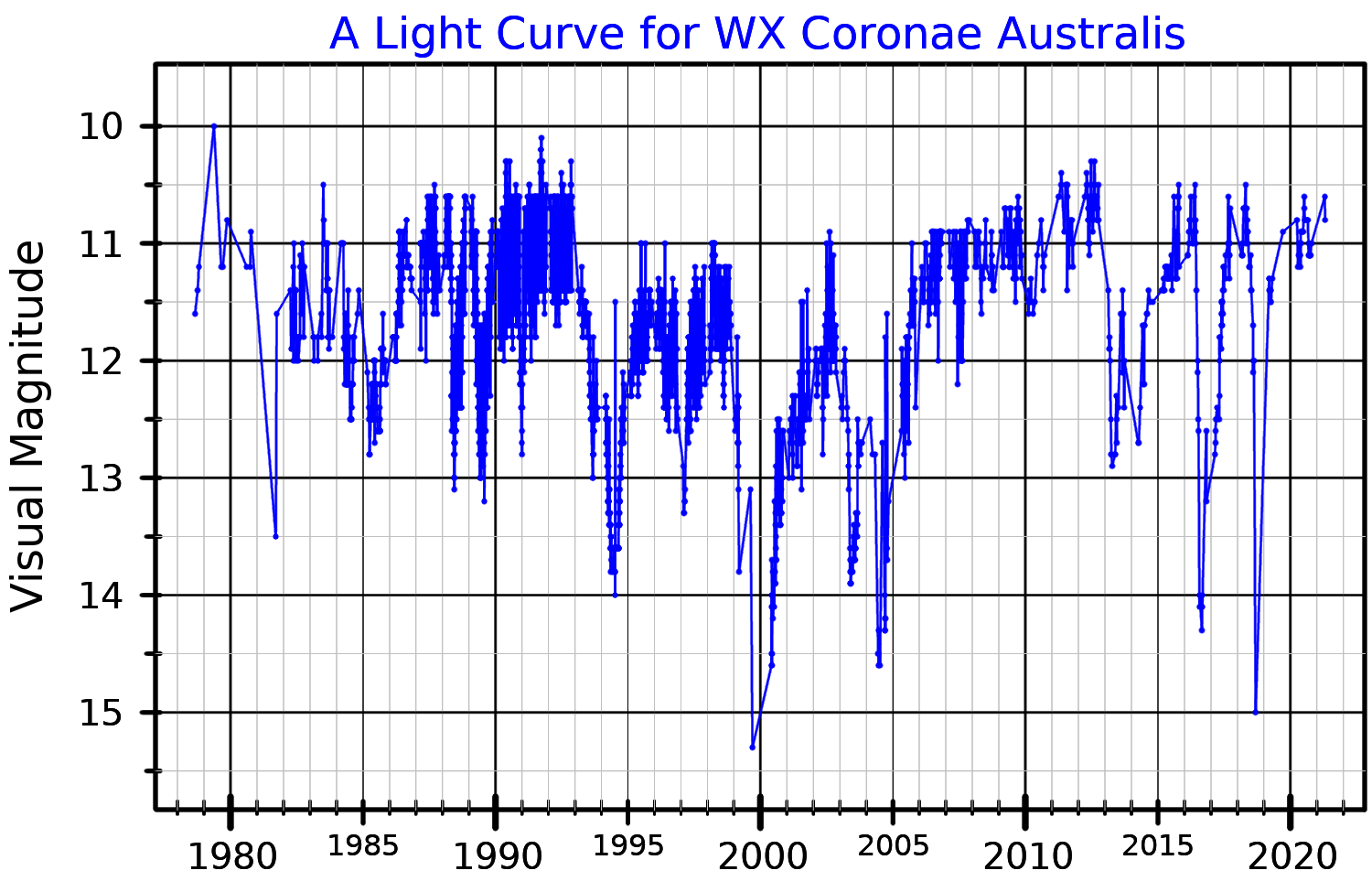
- A visual band light curve of WX Coronae Australis, from AAVSO data

Observation data Epoch J2000.0 Equinox J2000.0
- Constellation: Corona Australis
- Right ascension: 18^{h} 08^{m} 50.467^{s}
- Declination: −37° 19′ 43.21″
- Apparent magnitude (V): 10.25 - <16.5

Characteristics
- Spectral type: C(R5)
- Variable type: R CrB

Astrometry
Proper motion (μ)	RA: 1.421 mas/yr Dec.: −7.108 mas/yr
Parallax (π)	0.1641±0.0281 mas
Distance	approx. 20,000 ly (approx. 6,000 pc)

Details
Mass	1.00 M_{☉}
Luminosity	7,400 L_{☉}
Temperature	5,300 K

Other designations
- WX CrA, CD−37°12227, HD 324924

Database references
SIMBAD	data

WX Coronae Australis (WX CrA) is an R Coronae Borealis (R CrB) star in the constellation Corona Australis, one of the brightest examples of this extremely rare class of variable star. Despite the rarity, Corona Australis hosts another R CrB star, V Coronae Australis.

WX Coronae Australis is a luminous star with a large excess of carbon and very little hydrogen. It has the spectrum of a carbon star, of type R5 indicating that it shows strong carbon molecular bands but not as red overall as the majority of carbon stars. Its brightness is variable, with 78.9-day pulsations producing changes of about 0.1 magnitudes, as well as occasional deep fades by six or more magnitudes. This classifies it as an R Coronae Borealis variable. These stars are likely to have formed from the merger of two white dwarfs into a hydrogen-deficient carbon-rich hot supergiant that then cooled. The deep fades are caused by obscuration by carbon-rich dust condensing around the star.

WX Coronae Australis was first reported to be variable in 1928 after it was detected on two different photographic plates at magnitudes 12.2 and 16.0. It was catalogued as HV (Harvard Variable) 4119. The type of variability was not known at the time, but in 1936 its spectrum was measured as R5 and it was tentatively classified as an R CrB star. By 1996 it had been observed to fade 13 times at an average interval of 2,000 days.
