= DY Centauri =

Star in the constellation Centaurus

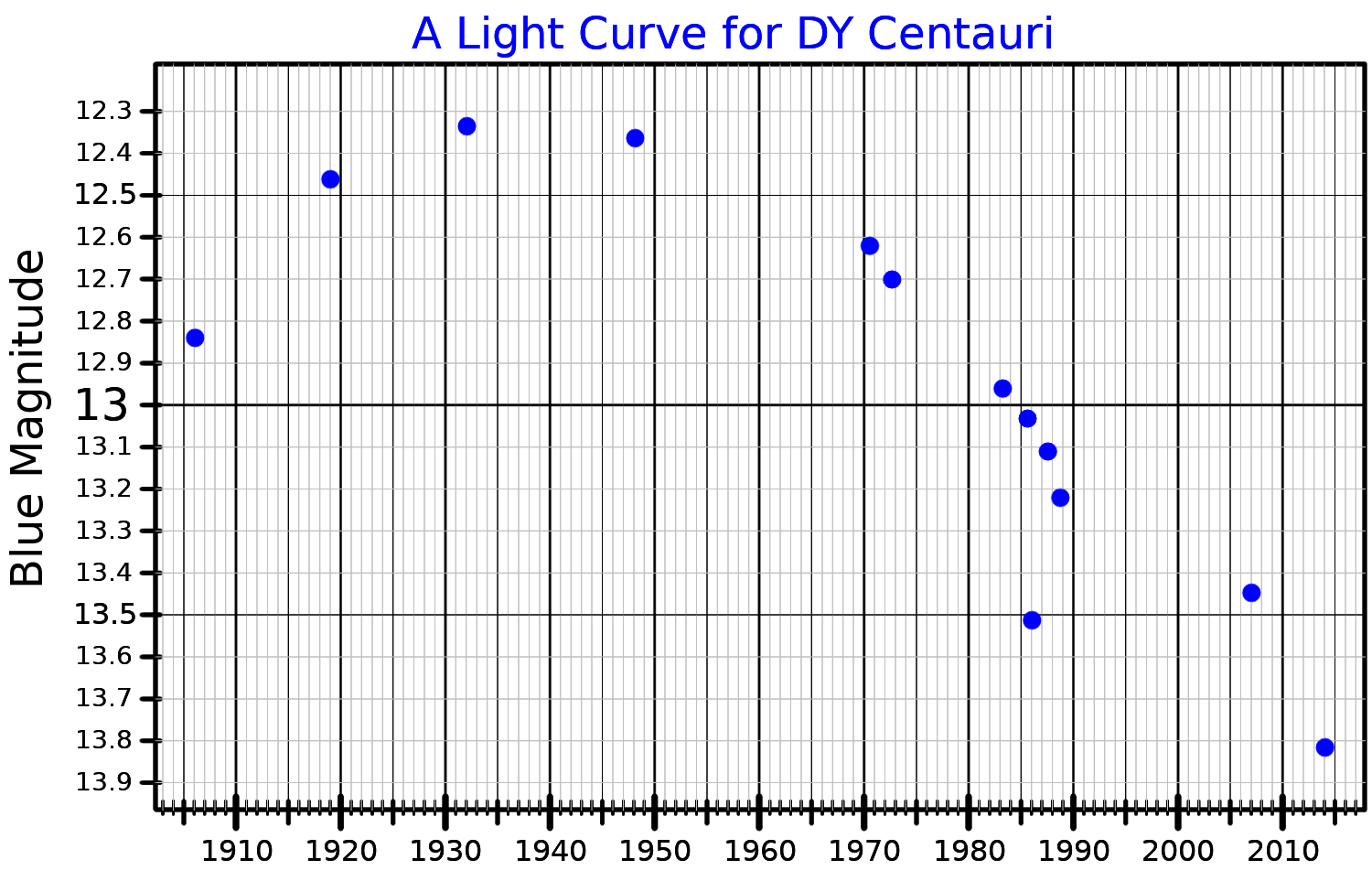
- A blue band light curve for DY Centauri, adapted from Schaefer (2016)

Observation data Epoch J2000 Equinox ICRS
- Constellation: Centaurus
- Right ascension: 13^{h} 25^{m} 34.08^{s}
- Declination: −54° 14′ 43.1″
- Apparent magnitude (V): 13.2

Characteristics
- Spectral type: C-Hd/B5-6Ie
- Variable type: RCB (inactive)

Astrometry
Radial velocity (R_{v})	21.30 ± 0.45 km/s
Distance	23000 ly (7000 pc)
Absolute magnitude (M_{V})	-3

Orbit(disputed)
Period (P)	39.66779 ± 0.0088 days
Eccentricity (e)	0.44 ± 0.10
Periastron epoch (T)	2445104.3364 ± 1.715
Argument of periastron (ω) (secondary)	344.5 ± 16.7°
Semi-amplitude (K_{1}) (primary)	13.26 ± 1.18 km/s

Details
Mass	0.8 M_{☉}
Radius	8 R_{☉}
Surface gravity (log g)	2.50 ± 0.12 cgs
Temperature	24800 ± 600 K
Rotational velocity (v sin i)	40 ± 5 km/s

Other designations
- DY Centauri, 2MASS J13253407-5414431, AAVSO 1319–53

Database references
SIMBAD	data

DY Centauri is a variable star in the constellation Centaurus. From its brightness, it is estimated to be 7000 parsecs (23000 light-years) away from Earth.

In 1930, Dorrit Hoffleit announced that 257 observations of the star had shown that its brightness varies, and minima in the light curve had been seen in 1897, 1901, 1924 and 1929. DY Centauri is classified as a R Coronae Borealis variable (RCB), a rare class of supergiant stars which show rapid and irregular decreases in brightness due to the formation of dust clouds on the stellar surface. However, DY Centauri is not an active RCB star anymore, and the last registered obscuration event was in 1934. This seems to be related to evolutionary changes in the star, represented by a very fast horizontal movement across the top of the HR diagram. Spectroscopic and photometric evidence show DY Centuari has increased its effective temperature from 5800 K in 1906 to 24800 K in 2010, while maintaining constant luminosity. As consequence, its visual apparent magnitude has faded from about 11.75 in the beginning of the 20th century to 13.2 in 2010 (due to changes in the bolometric correction), while its radius is calculated to have decreased from 100 R_{☉} to 8 R_{☉}, and rotation increased 2-fold, approaching critical velocity at which the star could be disrupted. There are only three other known stars with this behavior, called hot RCB stars, The DY Centauri is possibly experiencing an aftermath of the late thermal pulse during the asymptotic giant branch evolution stage.

DY Centauri has a peculiar chemical composition and is poor in hydrogen and rich in helium and carbon, being identified as an extreme helium star (EHe). In comparison to other RCB and EHe stars, however, its hydrogen content is relatively high. In the future, it is likely that the primary will evolve to a B subdwarf, a class of stars frequently found in binary systems.

The spectrum of DY Centauri indicates the presence of a low density expanding nebula around it, formed by gas ionized by ultraviolet radiation from the star. The nebula has an estimated dimension of 1.2 arcseconds and, from its expansion velocity, was probably created about a thousand years ago.

== Suspected stellar companion ==
Periodic changes in the radial velocity of DY Centauri have been detected, indicating that the star in a single-lined spectroscopic binary in an eccentric orbit (e = 0.44) with a period of 39.67 days. The companion star has an estimated minimum mass of 0.2 M_{☉}, so it can be a low mass white dwarf or main sequence star. With an estimated separation of only 10 R_{☉} at periastron, the system must have interacted in the past when the primary had larger dimensions, forming a common envelope.

Stars of R Coronae Borealis variable (RCB) type are believed to be the product of the merger of two white dwarfs, therefore being single stars, which is inconsistent with the identification of DY Centauri as a close binary. Thus, the origin and evolutionary state of the DY Centauri system remains uncertain as of 2014.

The stellar companion presence was not confirmed in 2020, and radial velocity variations were attributed instead to the 40-day star pulsation mode.
