= PV Telescopii =

Star in the constellation Telescopium

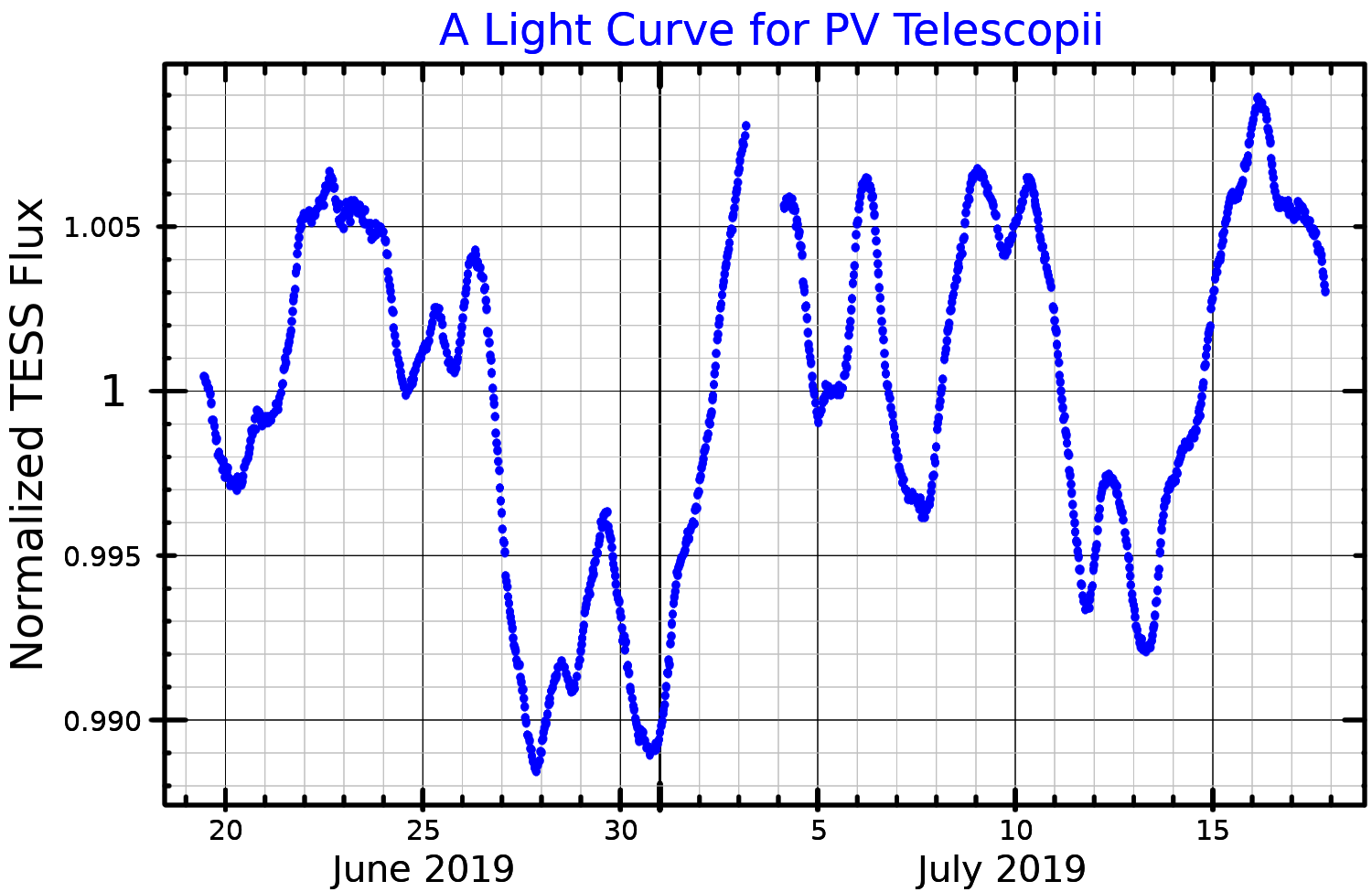
- A light curve for PV Telescopii, adapted from Jeffery et al. (2020)

Observation data Epoch J2000 Equinox ICRS
- Constellation: Telescopium
- Right ascension: 18^{h} 23^{m} 14.66203^{s}
- Declination: −56° 37′ 44.1401″
- Apparent magnitude (V): 9.30 (9.24 - 9.40)

Characteristics
- Spectral type: B5p
- U−B color index: −0.60
- B−V color index: −0.10
- Variable type: PV Tel

Astrometry
Radial velocity (R_{v})	−169 km/s
Proper motion (μ)	RA: −1.086 mas/yr Dec.: −7.705 mas/yr
Parallax (π)	0.1162±0.0449 mas
Distance	23,000 ly (7,100+1,400 −2,000 pc)
Absolute magnitude (M_{V})	−4.4

Details
Mass	0.94 M_{☉}
Radius	27.20+4.09 −7.26 R_{☉}
Luminosity	24,000+8,600 −9,900 L_{☉}
Surface gravity (log g)	1.60±0.25 cgs
Temperature	13,750±400 K
Metallicity [Fe/H]	−0.15 dex

Other designations
- PV Tel, CD−56°7300, HD 168476, HIP 90099, SAO 245434, 2MASS J18231466-5637441, AAVSO 1814-56

Database references
SIMBAD	data

PV Telescopii, also known as HD 168476, is a variable star in the southern constellation of Telescopium. It is too dim to be visible to the naked eye, having an apparent visual magnitude that has been measured varying from 9.24 down to 9.40. The star is the prototype of a class of objects called PV Telescopii variables. It is located at an estimated distance of approximately 23 kilolight-years (7.1 kiloparsecs) from the Sun, but is drifting closer with a radial velocity of −169 km/s.

In 1973, Arlo Udell Landolt published an article suggesting that the star, then known as HD 168476, might vary in brightness on a timedcale of a decade. In 1980, Helen Joan Walker and David Kilkenny confirmed that the star's brightness varies. It was given its variable star designation, PV Telescopii, in 1981.

This is an extreme helium star that shows a highly-processed atmosphere. It is a blue-white hued B-type supergiant star with a peculiar spectrum that has "weak hydrogen lines and enhanced lines of He and C". This object may be a late thermal pulse post-AGB star or the result of a merger of two white dwarf stars. The star shows radial velocity changes thought to be due to radial pulsations caused by a strange mode instability. It shows variations over a few days, 8–10 days being typically quoted. Despite a mass thought to be less than the Sun, it is actually around 24,000 times more luminous.
