= 1727 Mette =

Mars-crossing asteroid

Discovery
- Discovered by: A. D. Andrews
- Discovery site: Boyden Obs.
- Discovery date: 25 January 1965

Designations
- Named after: Mette Andrews (wife of discoverer)
- Alternative designations: 1965 BA · 1955 DC
- Minor planet category: Mars-crosser · Hungaria

Orbital characteristics
- Epoch 4 September 2017 (JD 2458000.5)
- Uncertainty parameter 0
- Observation arc: 61.54 yr (22,477 days)
- Aphelion: 2.0430 AU
- Perihelion: 1.6652 AU
- Semi-major axis: 1.8541 AU
- Eccentricity: 0.1019
- Orbital period (sidereal): 2.52 yr (922 days)
- Mean anomaly: 322.85°
- Inclination: 22.894°
- Longitude of ascending node: 133.04°
- Argument of perihelion: 312.94°
- Known satellites: 1(see 2nd infobox) (Note: Central Bureau for Astronomical Telegrams (No.3402), 5 February 2013 for (1727) METTE: "CCD photometric observations made between Jan. 17 and 21 show that minor planet (1727) Mette is a binary system with an orbital period of 21.05 +/- 0.03 hr. The light-curve of the primary has a period of 2.98091 +/- 0.00009 hr with an amplitude of 0.33 +/- 0.01 mag, indicating a moderately elongated body. Assuming a triaxial ellipsoidal shape and equatorial view, this gives an a/b ratio of 1.36 +/- 0.02. This makes the object unusual in that the primaries of most small binary systems are nearly spheroidal. The depth of the events ranges from 0.04 to 0.07 mag. The depth of the secondary event gives a lower limit for the effective secondary-to-primary diameter ratio of Ds/Dp = 0.20 +/- 0.02. A general "bowing" of the secondary period light curve (amplitude 0.01–0.02 mag) indicates that the satellite is probably tidally-locked to the orbital period." — Reported by B. D. Warner, Palmer Divide Observatory, Colorado Springs, CO, USA; R. D. Stephens, Center for Solar System Studies, Landers, CA, USA; and A. W. Harris, MoreData!, La Canada, CA, USA.)
- Earth MOID: 0.7183 AU

Physical characteristics
- Dimensions: 5.44±1.09 km 8.97 km (calculated)
- Synodic rotation period: 2.427 h (Note: Monson (2011) web: rotation period 2.427 hours with a brightness amplitude of 0.29. Summary figures at Asteroid Lightcurve Database for (1727) Mette); 2.63 h 2.637 h 3.22 h 2.981±0.001 h 2.98125±0.00004 h 2.981±0.001 h 2.981±0.003 h 2.9814±0.0001 h 2.98109±0.00007 h 2.9808±0.0002 h 2.9812±0.0002 h 3.000±0.014 h
- Geometric albedo: 0.20 (assumed); 0.544±0.218
- Spectral type: Tholen = S · S
- Absolute magnitude (H): 12.6 · 12.69±0.27 · 12.70

1727 Mette, provisional designation 1965 BA, is a binary Hungaria asteroid and Mars-crosser from the inner regions of the asteroid belt, approximately 9 kilometers in diameter.

It was discovered on 25 January 1965, by Irish astronomer David Andrews at Boyden Observatory near Bloemfontein in Free State, South Africa. It was named after the discoverer's wife Mette Andrews.

== Classification and orbit ==
The S-type asteroid is a member of the Hungaria family, which form the innermost dense concentration of asteroids in the Solar System. It is also a Mars-crossing asteroid, a dynamically unstable group between the main belt and the near-Earth populations.

It orbits the Sun in the inner main-belt at a distance of 1.7–2.0 AU once every 2 years and 6 months (922 days). Its orbit has an eccentricity of 0.10 and an inclination of 23° with respect to the ecliptic. Being a Mars-crosser, Mette made a relatively close approach to Mars on April 15, 2023, when it passed near the Red Planet at a distance of less than 0.08 AU (12,000,000 km). It was first identified as 1955 DC at Goethe Link Observatory in 1955, extending the body's observation arc by 10 years prior to its official discovery observation.

== Physical parameters ==
A large number of rotational lightcurves of Mette were obtained from photometric observations. They gave a rotation period of approximately 2.981 hours (best rated results) with a brightness variation between 0.22 and 0.38 magnitude, indicating a moderately elongated body (U=3/3/3). The Collaborative Asteroid Lightcurve Link assumes a standard albedo for stony asteroids of 0.20 and calculates a diameter of 8.97 kilometers, while observations with the Wide-field Infrared Survey Explorer gave a diameter of 5.44 kilometers and an albedo of 0.544.

== Naming ==
This minor planet was named by the discoverer after his wife, Mette Andrews for her comprehension of his nocturnal working hours and absence from home. The approved naming citation was published by the Minor Planet Center on 1 February 1980 (M.P.C. 5183).

== Moon ==
Satellite
Discovery
- Discovery date: 17 January 2013
- Detection method: Light-curve

Orbital characteristics
- Semi-major axis: 21 km
- Orbital period (sidereal): 0.8746±0.0008 days (20 hours, 59±1 minutes)
- Angular distance: 31 mas (maximum)
- Satellite of: 1727 Mette

Physical characteristics
- Dimensions: 2.14 km
- Apparent magnitude: 3.4 ± 0.2 fainter than primary
- Absolute magnitude (H): 15.7

In 2013, a satellite orbiting the asteroid was discovered. The moon measures about 2 kilometers in diameter and orbits Mette once every 20 hours and 59 minutes.

There are several hundreds of asteroids known to have satellites (also see Category:Binary asteroids).
