= Helen J. Walker =

- Born: Helen Joan Walker; 2 January 1953; Warwick, England
- Died: 19 September 2017 (aged 64); Wantage, Oxfordshire, England
- Education: University of St Andrews
- Scientific career
- Fields: Astronomy
- Workplaces: Queen Mary College; Rutherford Appleton Laboratory; Leiden University; Ames Research Center
- Thesis: A spectroscopic and photometric investigation of the extreme helium-rich star HD 168476
- Doctoral advisor: Philip W. Hill

Helen Joan Walker (2 January 1953 – 19 September 2017) was a UK space scientist.

== Personal life ==
She was born in Warwick on 2 January 1953.

She died in Wantage, Oxfordshire, on 19 September 2017, after a five-month illness, and her funeral was in Oxfordshire on 9 October.

== Education and career ==
A space scientist, her research was focused on planets and pre-planetary material around stars, in particular in the infrared.

Walker was an undergraduate student at the University of St Andrews. She subsequently got a job with the Space and Defense division of Marconi, but after returning to St Andrews for graduation she instead did an observational PhD in stellar spectroscopy at St Andrews, supervised by Phil Hill, on PV Telescopii. She was then a research associate at Queen Mary College with Peter Clegg, working on the Infrared Astronomical Satellite (IRAS). In 1981 she was seconded to the mission control centre at Rutherford Appleton Laboratory (RAL), where she worked as a support scientist. She subsequently worked at Leiden University and NASA Ames.

She returned to RAL in 1989 as the co-investigator of ISOPHOT on the Infrared Space Observatory, the leader of the Stars and Circumstellar Material Group, the scientific lead of the UK ISOPHOT software group and a leader of the ISO/IRAS user support team. Following this, she worked on the scientific planning of Mars Express until 2009. In 2008 she joined the James Webb Space Telescope project, and she worked on the calibration and testing of the MIRI instrument, as the test team leader.

She was a member of the Royal Astronomical Society, serving on its council as secretary then senior secretary from 2001 to 2011. She was also a supporter of the Society for Popular Astronomy, serving as president in 2008–09, and Treasurer in 2011–2017. She was active in astronomy outreach, and was involved with the International Year of Astronomy in 2009, leading the "Telescopes for Schools" project. She was an advocate for woman in astronomy.
