= RY Sagittarii =

Yellow supergiant star in the constellation Sagittarius

- Location of RY Sagittarii (circled)

Observation data Epoch J2000.0 ICRS Equinox ICRS
- Constellation: Sagittarius
- Right ascension: 19^{h} 16^{m} 32.76686^{s}
- Declination: −33° 31′ 20.3402″
- Apparent magnitude (V): 5.8-14.0

Characteristics
- Spectral type: G0Iaep (C1,0)
- Variable type: R CrB

Astrometry
Radial velocity (R_{v})	−16.02 km/s
Proper motion (μ)	RA: 8.957 mas/yr Dec.: −0.277 mas/yr
Parallax (π)	0.5880±0.0273 mas
Distance	5,500 ± 300 ly (1,700 ± 80 pc)
Absolute magnitude (M_{V})	−5

Details
Radius	60 R_{☉}
Luminosity	9,120 L_{☉}
Temperature	7,250 K

Other designations
- RY Sgr, CD−33 14076, HD 180093, HIP 94730, HR 7296, SAO 211117

Database references
SIMBAD	data

RY Sagittarii is a yellow supergiant and an R Coronae Borealis type variable star in the constellation Sagittarius. Although it ostensibly has the spectrum of a G-type star, it differs markedly from most in that it has almost no hydrogen and much carbon.

== Discovery ==
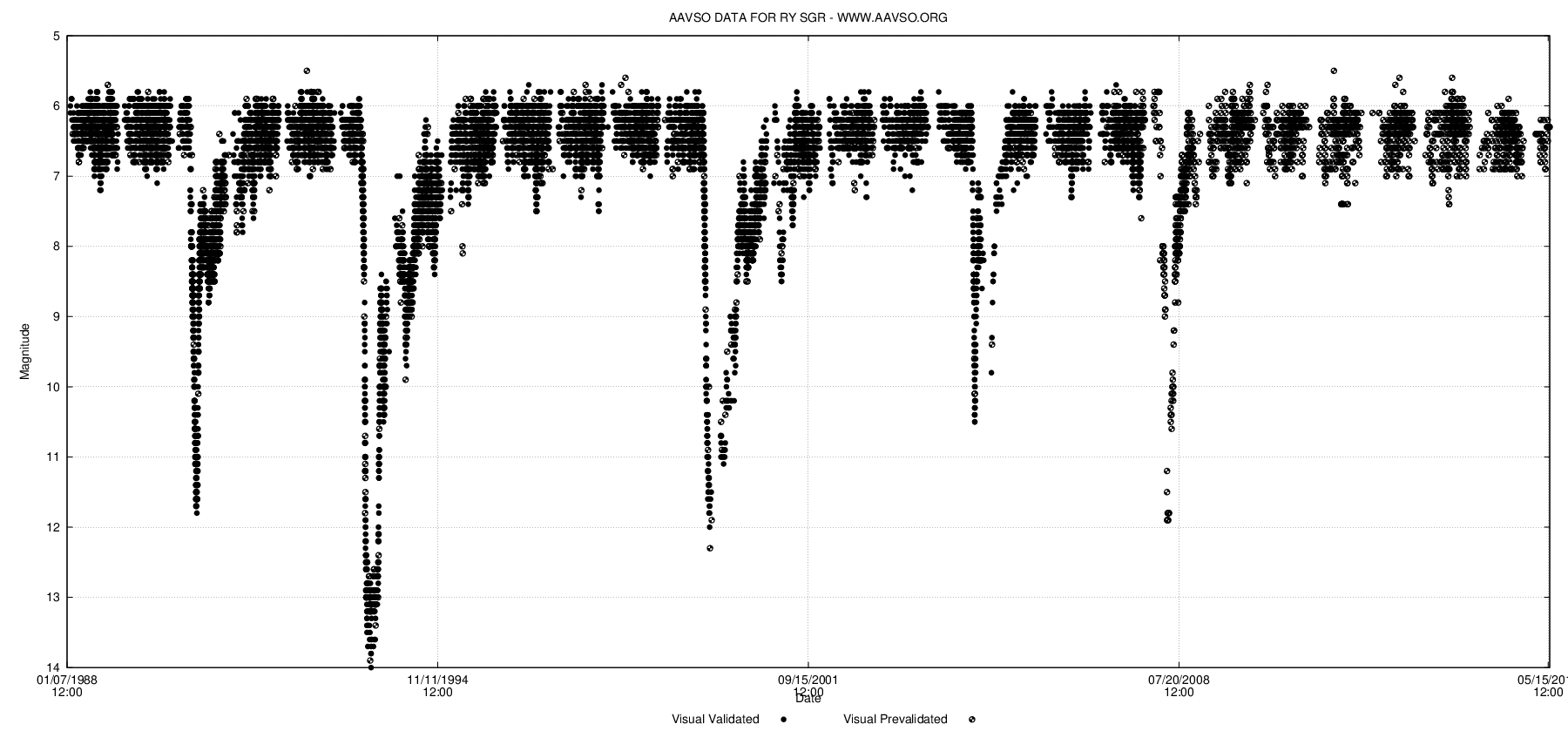
RY Sgr light curve

Colonel Ernest Elliott Markwick first came across what became known as RY Sagittarii during searches for variable stars while posted in Gibraltar. He recorded it dimming from magnitude 7 in July 1893 to fainter than 11 by 23 October that year, and brightening to magnitude 6.4 by November 1894. Edward Charles Pickering wrote that it was a "remarkable object", and "nearly got away". The spectrum was first noted to be peculiar at the time, and by 1953 it was classified as a R Coronae Borealis variable, along with a handful of other stars.

Mystified by its origins, Danziger postulated possible explanations as forming from a helium cloud, an aged star that had exhausted its hydrogen, or a star that had somehow thrown off its hydrogen envelope, though noted there was no evidence of such an envelope. He conceded that knowledge of star evolution was not advanced enough to come up with an explanation.

== Variability ==
It is one of the three brightest R Coronae Borealis stars visible to Earth observers, along with R Coronae Borealis and V854 Centauri, and the brightest in the southern hemisphere. It is also a pulsating variable, with a semiregular period of 38 days. Its light curve has been studied for over a hundred years and is typical for the class, characterised by a sudden drop in brightness of several magnitudes over a few weeks before gradually brightening over the following several months. The timing between these dimmings is irregular. The cause of the drop in magnitude is the presence of dust clouds of carbon obscuring (and most likely ejected from) the star, though the mechanism how this might occur is not known. Extensive clouds have been detected with ESO's Very Large Telescope Interferometer.

== Properties ==
The star is so remote that its parallax, distance and hence luminosity were impossible to calculate with any accuracy. The Hipparcos satellite calculated its parallax at 1.29 milliarcseconds, yielding a distance of 1,716.6 light-years (526.32 parsecs) from Earth. Its parallax from the Gaia EDR3 is much smaller at 0.56 mas, indicating a much larger distance consistent with non-parallax estimates of the distance. The distance derived indirectly by comparison with similar stars, is around 2,000 parsecs. Its effective temperature has been calculated at 7,250 K and its size at 60 R_{☉} based on an assumed luminosity of 9,120 L_{☉}.
