= Z Ursae Minoris =

Star in the constellation Ursa Minor

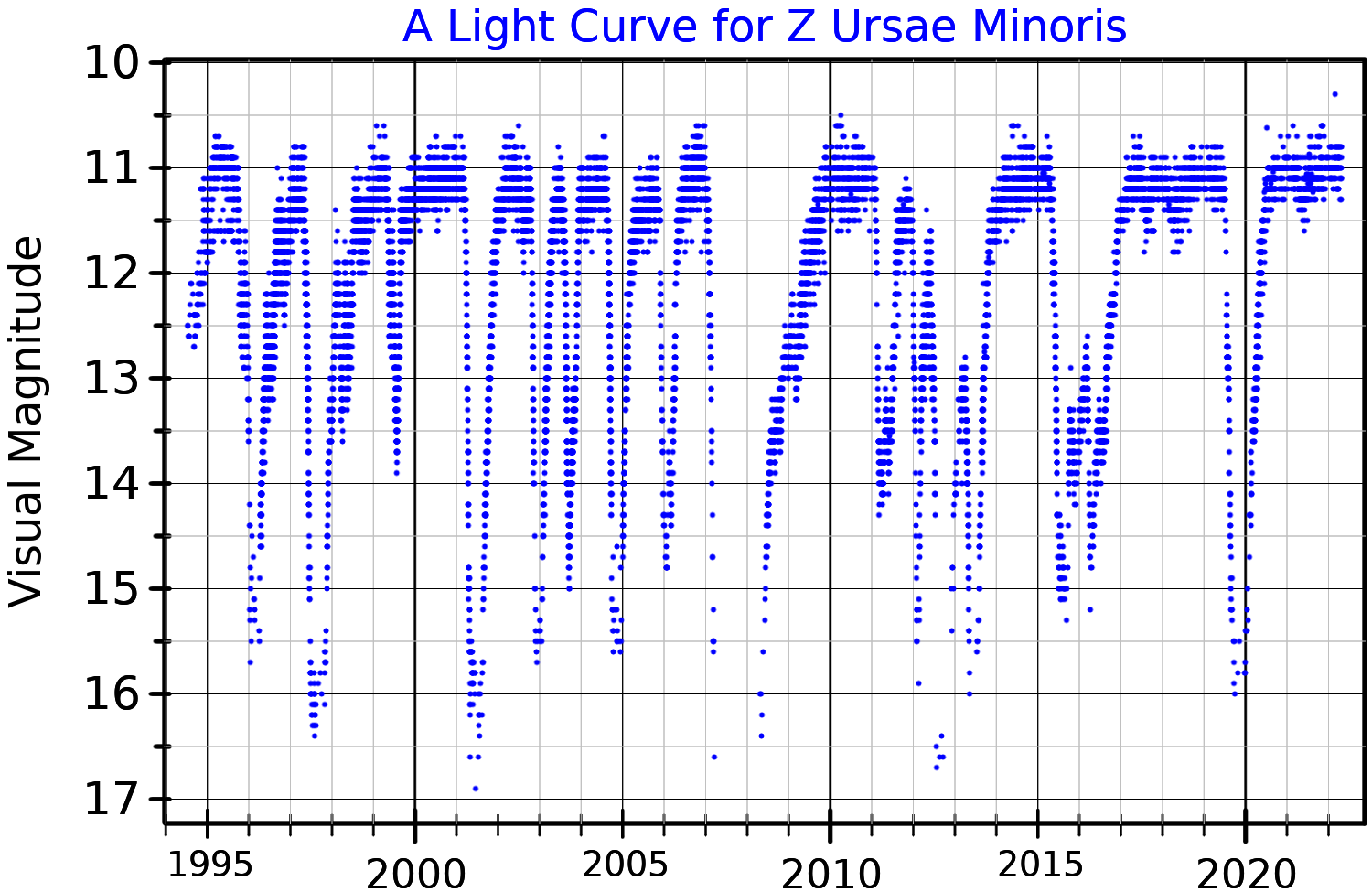
- A visual band light curve for Z Ursae Minoris, plotted from AAVSO data

Observation data Epoch J2000.0 Equinox ICRS
- Constellation: Ursa Minor
- Right ascension: 15^{h} 02^{m} 01.36335^{s}
- Declination: +83° 03′ 48.6299″
- Apparent magnitude (V): 10.8 - 19.0

Characteristics
- Spectral type: C (R)
- Variable type: R CrB

Astrometry
Radial velocity (R_{v})	−36.07±0.98 km/s
Proper motion (μ)	RA: −7.346 mas/yr Dec.: +4.322 mas/yr
Parallax (π)	0.2159±0.0231 mas
Distance	approx. 15,000 ly (approx. 4,600 pc)

Details
Mass	0.7±0.2 M_{☉}
Luminosity	7,900+12,000 −4,800 L_{☉}
Surface gravity (log g)	0.5±0.3 cgs
Temperature	5,250±250 K
Metallicity [Fe/H]	−1.85 dex

Other designations
- Z UMi, TYC 4634-1727-1, 2MASS J15020132+8303485

Database references
SIMBAD	data

Z Ursae Minoris (Z UMi) is a carbon star and R Coronae Borealis variable in the constellation Ursa Minor located about 15000 light-years away.

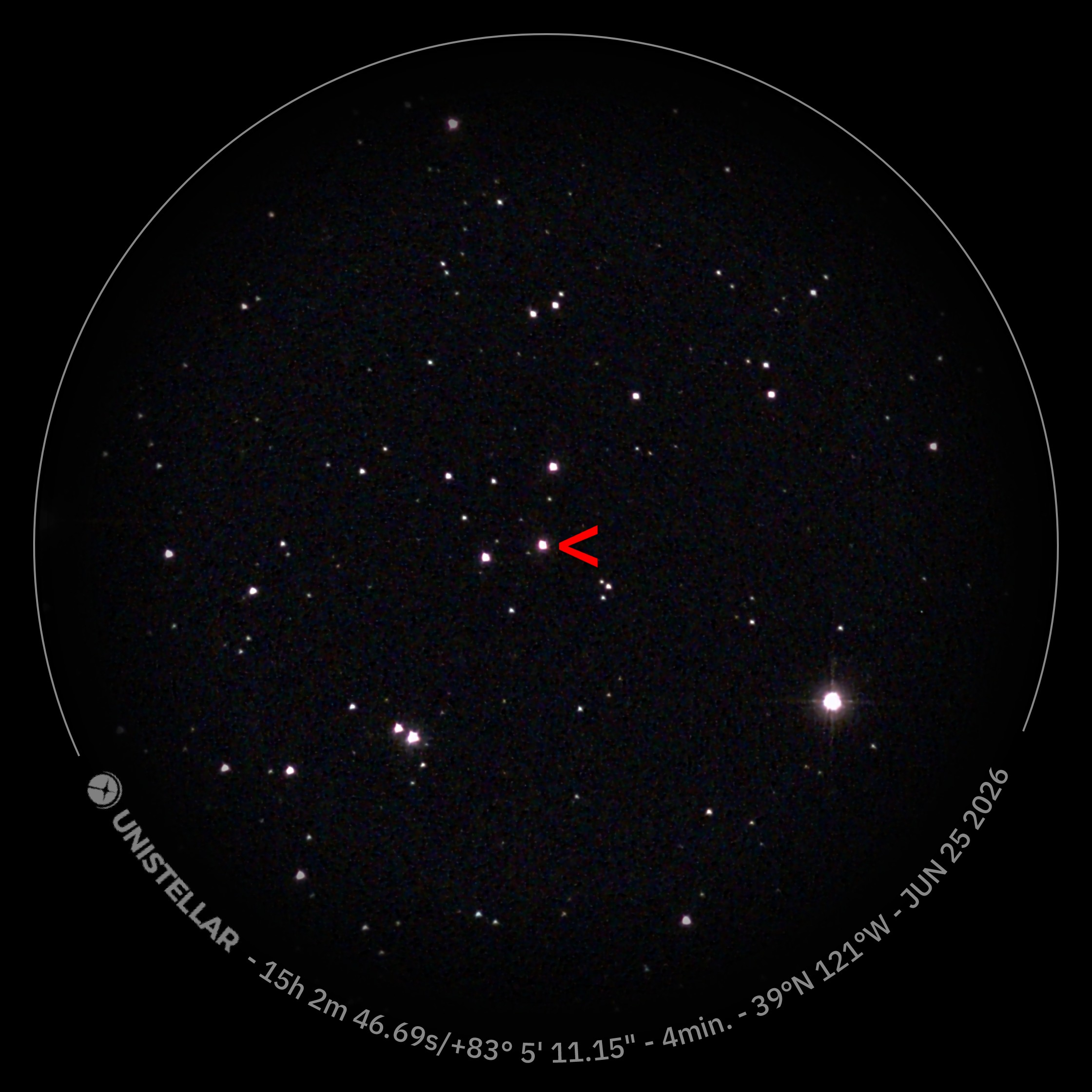
Z Ursae Minoris (Z Umi) imaged on 25 June 2026 with a Unistellar 114mm smart telescope (north is towards the right, field of view about 0.5°)

Z Ursae Minoris was discovered to be a variable star in 1934. It was catalogued as a probable Mira variable, due to its red colour and variations over several hundred days. It was discovered to be a carbon star in a survey published in 1985, and subsequently found also to be hydrogen-deficient. After fading by almost six magnitudes in 1992, it was classified as an R Coronae Borealis variable. It was confirmed as an R Coronae Borealis variable, one of the coolest in the class, after its spectrum was analysed in 2006.

Its apparent magnitude varies between 10.8 and 19.0, representing a nearly 2000–fold change in brightness. Since Z UMi is located less than 7 degrees away from the North Celestial Pole, it is a circumpolar star for mid-northern latitudes allowing year round tracking.
