= PV Telescopii variable =

Type of variable star

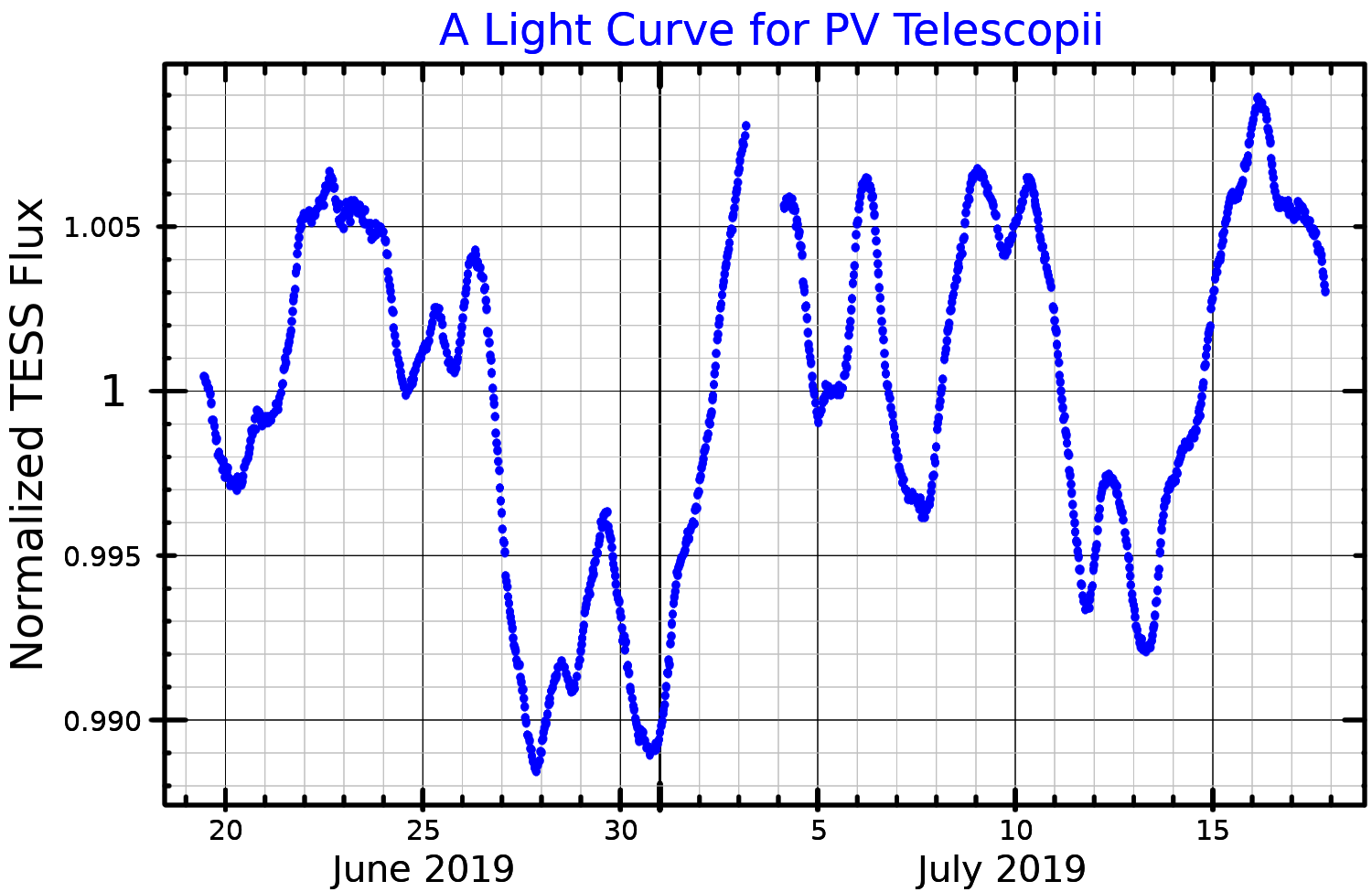
A light curve for PV Telescopii, adapted from Jeffery et al. (2020)

PV Telescopii variable is a type of variable star that is established in the General Catalogue of Variable Stars with the acronym PVTEL. This class of variables are defined as "helium supergiant Bp stars with weak hydrogen lines and enhanced lines of He and C". That is, the hydrogen spectral lines of these stars are weaker than normal for a star of stellar class B, while the lines of helium and carbon are stronger. They are a type of extreme helium star.

The prototype for this category of variable is PV Telescopii, which undergoes small but complex luminosity variations and radial velocity fluctuations. The PV Tel stars are extremely hydrogen-deficient compared to other B-class stars and vary in luminosity on time scales ranging from a few hours to several years. As of 2008, there are twelve confirmed PV Tel variables in the General Catalogue of Variable Stars.

PV Telescopii variables are subdivided into three distinct types on the basis of spectral type: type I represents late B and A stars, type II represents O and early B, and type III represents F and G stars. The type III stars are always carbon-rich and hydrogen-deficient, while the type I and II stars do not necessarily have an excess of carbon. The hotter types pulsate more quickly than the cooler types.

== List ==
The following list contains selected PV Telescopii variable that are of interest to amateur or professional astronomy. Unless otherwise noted, the given magnitudes are in the V-band.

Star	Maximum magnitude	Minimum magnitude	Type	Spectral type
Upsilon Sagittarii	4.43	4.65	I (Note: also a spectroscopic binary, possibly eclipsing)	F2p
HD 182040	6.95	7.17	III	C...
HM Librae	7.42	7.63	III	C
KS Persei	7.60	7.85	I	A5Iap
PV Telescopii	9.24	9.40	I	B5p
BD +1 4381	9.47	9.60	I	F
CD -35 11760	9.62	9.83	I	B4Ibe
HD 160641	9.78	10.08	II	sdOC9.5II-III_He40
DN Leonis	9.91	10.00	II	Bp
HD 124448	9.94	10.03	II	B3p
NO Serpentis	10.27	10.39	I	B
V1920 Cygni	10.30	10.41	I	B2/3
CPD -58 2721	10.40	10.60	I	B+...
BD -9 4395	10.44	10.63	II	B
LS IV -1 2	10.95	11.05	I	OB+
