= R Coronae Borealis =

Variable star in the constellation Corona Borealis

- Location of R Coronae Borealis (circled)

Observation data Epoch J2000.0 Equinox ICRS
- Constellation: Corona Borealis
- Right ascension: 15^{h} 48^{m} 34.4147^{s}
- Declination: +28° 09′ 24.295″
- Apparent magnitude (V): 5.71 - 14.8

Characteristics
- Spectral type: G0Iep
- U−B color index: 0.13
- B−V color index: 0.60
- V−R color index: 0.45
- J−H color index: 0.275
- J−K color index: 0.800
- Variable type: R CrB

Astrometry
Radial velocity (R_{v})	27.83 km/s
Proper motion (μ)	RA: −2.10 mas/yr Dec.: −11.52 mas/yr
Parallax (π)	0.73±0.27 mas
Distance	4,560 ly (1,400 pc)
Absolute magnitude (M_{V})	−5

Details
Mass	0.8-0.9 M_{☉}
Radius	85 R_{☉}
Luminosity	~10,000 L_{☉}
Surface gravity (log g)	0.5 cgs
Temperature	6,750 K

Other designations
- R Coronae Borealis, R CrB, GSC2 N1330022410, 2MASS J15483440+2809242, AG+28°1513, GSC 02039-01605, BD+28°2477, HD 141527, PLX 3581, TYC 2039-1605-1, CDS 886, PPM 104338, GC 21257, HIP 77442, RAFGL 4219, GCRV 9116, HR 5880, AAVSO 1544+28A, IRAS 15465+2818, SAO 84015.

Database references
SIMBAD	data

R Coronae Borealis is a low-mass yellow supergiant star in the constellation of Corona Borealis. It is the prototype of the R Coronae Borealis variable of variable stars, which fade by several magnitudes at irregular intervals. R Coronae Borealis itself normally shines at approximately magnitude 6, just about visible to the naked eye, but at intervals of several months to many years fades to as faint as 15th magnitude. Over successive months it then gradually returns to its normal brightness, giving it the nickname "reverse nova", after the more common type of star which rapidly increases in brightness before fading.

== Nomenclature ==
R Coronae Borealis is a faint naked eye star, but does not have any traditional names. Johann Bayer did not give it a Greek letter designation although it is marked on his map. John Flamsteed numbered all the Bayer stars but did not add any additional designations for fainter stars, so R Coronae Borealis does not appear in either of these two catalogues.

At its discovery it was described simply as "the variable in the Northern crown". It was later referred to as Variabilis Coronae, "Variable (star) of Corona (Borealis)". It has also been called a "reverse nova" because of its habit of fading from sight. The variable star designation R Coronae Borealis was introduced, as "Coronae R" by Friedrich Wilhelm Argelander in 1850.

== Variability ==
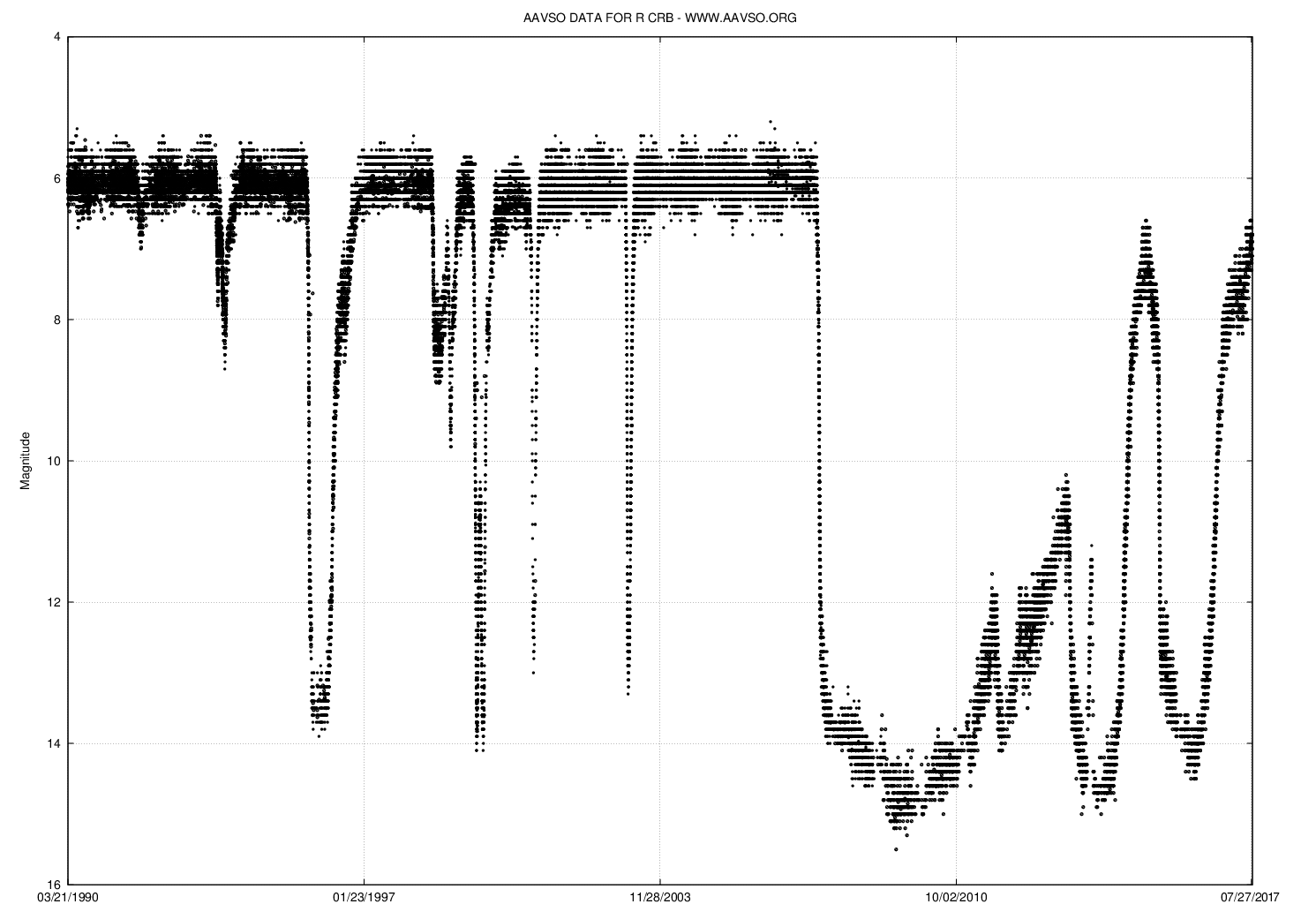
Light curve of R Coronae Borealis from 1990 to 2017, showing the unprecedented deep minimum

The variability of R Coronae Borealis was discovered by English astronomer Edward Pigott in 1795. In 1935 it was the first star shown to have a different chemical composition to the Sun via spectral analysis.

R Coronae Borealis is the prototype of the R Coronae Borealis class of variable stars. It is one of only two R Coronae Borealis variables bright enough to be seen with the naked eye, along with RY Sagittarii. Much of the time it shows variations of around a tenth of a magnitude with poorly defined periods that have been reported as 40 and 51 days. These correspond to the first overtone and fundamental radial pulsation modes for an extreme helium star slightly under one M_{☉}.

At irregular intervals a few years or decades apart R Coronae Borealis fades from its normal brightness near 6th magnitude for a period of months or sometimes years. There is no fixed minimum, but the star can become fainter than 15th magnitude in the visual range. The fading is less pronounced at longer wavelengths. Typically the star starts to return to maximum brightness almost immediately from its minimum, although occasionally this is interrupted by another fade. The cause of this behaviour is believed to be a regular build-up of carbon dust in the star's atmosphere. The sudden drop in brightness may be caused by a rapid condensation of carbon-rich dust similar to soot, resulting in much of the star's light being blocked. The gradual restoration to normal brightness results from the dust being dispersed by radiation pressure.

In August 2007, R Coronae Borealis began a fade to an unprecedented minimum. It fell to 14th magnitude in 33 days, then continued to fade slowly, dropping below 15th magnitude in June 2009. It then began an equally slow rise, not reaching 12th magnitude until late 2011. This was an unusually deep and exceptional long minimum, longer even than a deep five year minimum which had occurred in 1962–7. It then faded again to near 15th magnitude, and by August 2014 it had been below 10th magnitude for 7 years. In late 2014, it brightened quickly to 7th magnitude but then began to fade again. By mid-2017, it had been below its "normal" brightness for ten years. It also reached a new record faintest at magnitude 15.2.

== Spectrum ==
R Coronae Borealis at maximum light shows the spectrum a late F or early G yellow supergiant, but with marked peculiarities. Hydrogen lines are weak or absent, while carbon lines and molecular bands of cyanogen (CN) and C_{2} are exceptionally strong. Helium lines and metals such as calcium are also present. The spectrum is variable, most obviously during the brightness fades. The normal absorption spectrum is replaced by emission lines, especially He_{I}, Ca_{II}, Na_{I}, and other metals. The lines are typically very narrow at this stage. Helium emission lines sometimes show P Cygni profiles. In deep minima, many of the metal lines disappear although the Ca doublet remains strong. Forbidden "nebular" lines of [O_{I}], [O_{II}], and [N_{II}] can be detected at times.

The spectrum at maximum indicates that hydrogen in R Coronae Borealis is strongly depleted, helium is the dominant element, and carbon is strongly enhanced. At minimum, the spectrum shows the development of carbon clouds that obscure the photosphere, leaving chromospheric lines visible at times.

== Properties ==
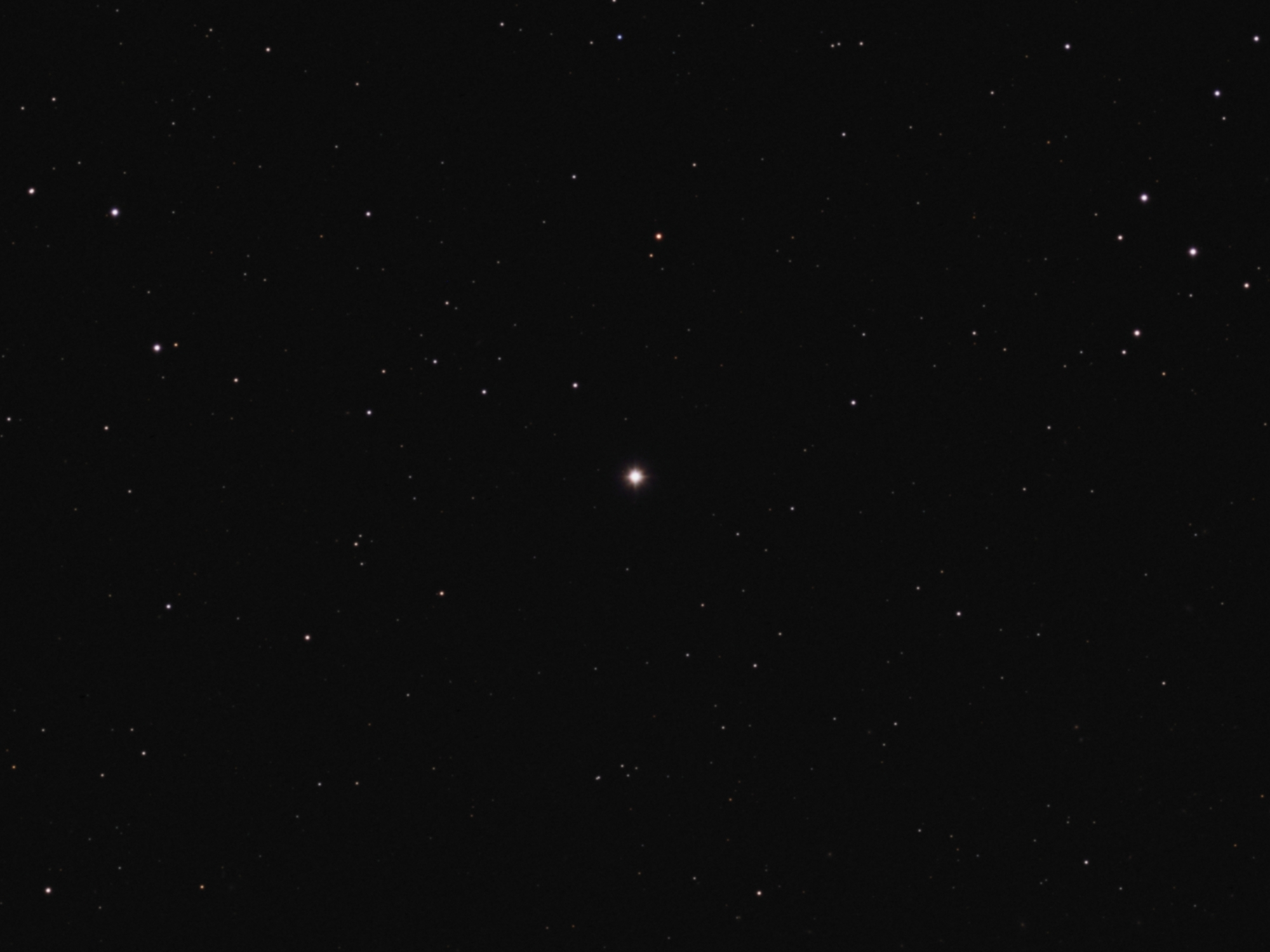
R Coronae Borealis in optical light

R Coronae Borealis is about 90% helium and less than 1% hydrogen. The majority of the remainder is carbon. This classifies it as a carbon-enhanced extreme helium star. Modelling the pulsations suggests that the star's mass is 0.8-0.9 M_{☉}. The temperature at maximum is reasonably well known at 6,900K and appears to decrease during the fades as the photosphere is obscured by condensing dust.

The distance of R Coronae Borealis is not known exactly, but is estimated at 1.4 kiloparsecs from assumptions about its intrinsic brightness. The absolute magnitude of −5 is calculated by comparison with R CrB variables in the Large Magellanic Cloud whose distances are known quite accurately. The luminosity is estimated from helium star models to be 19,000 L_{☉} and the star has a radius around 100 R_{☉}. The Gaia data release 1 parallax also gives a distance of 1.4 kpc although with a considerable margin of error.

There is a fainter star 3" away from R Coronae Borealis, but it is believed to be a distant class K dwarf. Its colour and apparent magnitude are not consistent with being at the same distance as R Coronae Borealis.

== Formation ==
There are two main models for the formation of R CrB stars: the merger of two white dwarfs; or a very late helium flash in a post-AGB star. Models of post-AGB stars calculate that a star with the appearance of R CrB would have a mass around 0.6 M_{☉} so it is thought to have formed by the merger of a carbon-oxygen white dwarf and a helium white dwarf. The detection of significant lithium in the atmosphere is not easily explained by the merger model, but is a natural consequence of a late helium flash. Evolutionary models of post-AGB stars give a mass of 0.66 M_{☉} for R CrB, but with a considerable margin of error.

== Circumstellar material ==
Direct imaging with the Hubble Space Telescope shows extensive dust clouds out to a radius of around 2000 astronomical units from R Coronae Borealis, corresponding to a stream of fine dust (composed of grains about 5 nm in diameter) associated with the star's stellar wind, and coarser dust (composed of grains with a diameter of around 0.14 μm) ejected periodically. The obscuration appears to happen closer to the star as clouds of carbon condense at shock regions in an expanding front. "Puffs" of dust emitted from the star condense at about 85 R_{☉} from the surface, and are visible as cometary knots when they lie to side of the star. There is also a 2 M_{☉} shell about 4 pc wide containing dust at 25 K, which may be a fossil planetary nebula.
