= NGC 5030 =

Spiral galaxy in the constellation Virgo

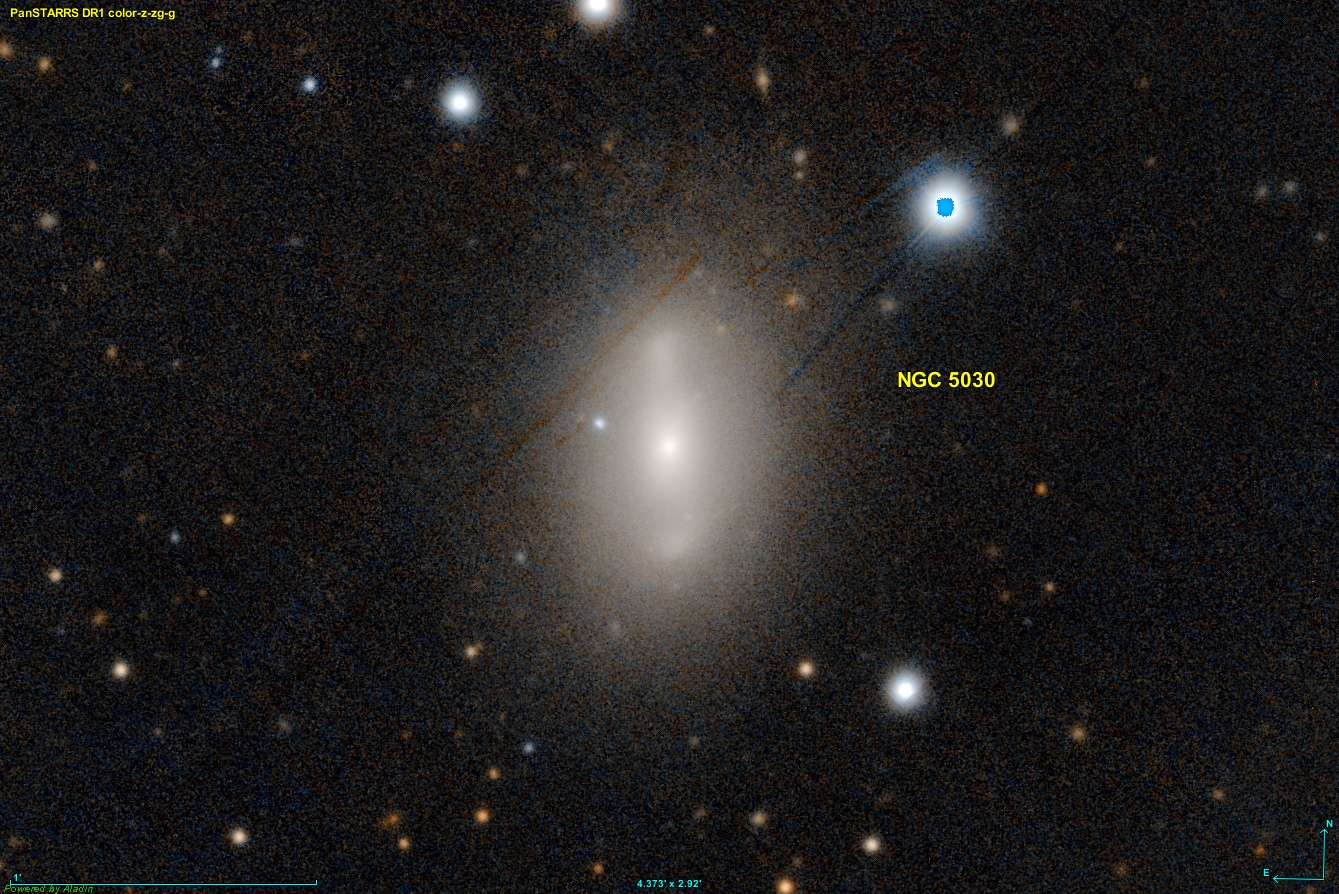

Observation data (J2000 epoch)
- Constellation: Virgo
- Right ascension: 13^{h} 13^{m} 54.144^{s}
- Declination: −16° 29′ 27.43″
- Redshift: 2397 km/s
- Heliocentric radial velocity: 0.007996
- Distance: 118.7 Mly (36.39 Mpc)
- Apparent magnitude (B): 14.2

Characteristics
- Type: SB0^{+}(r)?
- Size: 56,500 ly (17,330 pc) (Note: RC3 D_{25}; R_{25} (blue) values used.)
- Apparent size (V): 1.8′ × 1.3′

Other designations
- NGC 5030, MCG -03-34-023, PGC 45991

NGC 5030 is a barred spiral galaxy in the constellation Virgo. The object was discovered on 17 March 1881 by the American astronomer Edward Singleton Holden.

== See also ==
- List of NGC objects
