= HD 37519 =

Star in the constellation Auriga

- Location of HD 37519 (circled in red)

Observation data Epoch J2000 Equinox ICRS
- Constellation: Auriga
- Right ascension: 05^{h} 40^{m} 35.90734^{s}
- Declination: +31° 21′ 29.5183″
- Apparent magnitude (V): 6.04

Characteristics
- Spectral type: B9.5III-IV(p)? (Hg?)
- Apparent magnitude (G): 6.00
- U−B color index: −0.21
- B−V color index: +0.05
- Variable type: suspected

Astrometry
Radial velocity (R_{v})	−10.2±3.4 km/s
Proper motion (μ)	RA: −5.014±0.085 mas/yr Dec.: −7.671±0.042 mas/yr
Parallax (π)	4.1237±0.0612 mas
Distance	790 ± 10 ly (243 ± 4 pc)
Absolute magnitude (M_{V})	−0.43

Details
Mass	2.8 M_{☉}
Radius	6.2 R_{☉}
Luminosity	221 L_{☉}
Surface gravity (log g)	3.88 cgs
Temperature	10,677 K
Rotational velocity (v sin i)	195 km/s
Age	375 Myr

Other designations
- NSV 2537, BD+31°1048, FK5 2425, HD 37519, HIP 26712, HR 1938, SAO 58319, Gaia DR3 3447703809100726400

Database references
SIMBAD	data

HD 37519 is a star in the northern constellation Auriga. It has a blue-white hue and is dimly visible to the naked eye with an apparent visual magnitude of 6.04. The distance to HD 37519 is approximately 790 light years based on parallax, but it is drifting closer with a radial velocity of −10 km/s. It has been called Andrews' Star, after astronomer A. David Andrews.

Anne Cowley in 1972 found a stellar classification of B9.5III-IV(p)? (Hg?) for this star, suggesting it is an evolved B-type star and a suspected chemically peculiar star of the mercury-manganese type. It is estimated to be 375 million years old and with a high rate of spin, showing a projected rotational velocity of 195 km/s. In March 1964, a suspected flare of HD 37519 was detected that increased the star's brightness by about three magnitudes. Smaller variations of up to two magnitudes were detected a few days later, suggesting there might be a flare star companion. However, follow-up observations failed to confirm the variability. The star is radiating 221 times the luminosity of the Sun from its photosphere at an effective temperature of 10,677 K.
