= A. David Andrews =

Irish astronomer

Asteroids discovered: 1
1727 Mette	25 January 1965

A. David Andrews (born 1933) is an Irish astronomer. He studied at Oriel College, Oxford and University of Dublin. He spent the early 1960s in Denmark working with astrophysicist M. Rudkjobing at the Aarhus Observatory. He moved on in 1963 to Armagh Observatory in Northern Ireland where he spent the next 35 years. Andrews discovered the minor planet 1727 Mette (named after Andrews' Danish wife) whilst at the Boyden Observatory located in Bloemfontein, South Africa, where he was acting director. It was while at Boyden Observatory that he commenced his lifelong work on flare stars. He was the first to make full use of computers, in 1968, at Armagh Observatory. Andrews was Editor of the Irish Astronomical Journal following Ernst Öpik, and in 1967 became a founder member of Commission 27 Working Group on Flare Stars of the International Astronomical Union.

The Boyden Station was created by Harvard University in 1889 in Arequipa, Peru, using Uriah A. Boyden's bequest to Harvard. In 1927 the renamed Boyden Observatory moved across continents to its present location in South Africa. This became the site of the Armagh-Dunsink-Harvard 36-inch Baker-Schmidt telescope utilized by E. M. Lindsay (Harvard & Armagh) and other Irish and international astronomers. In 1976 the Observatory was handed over to the University of the Orange Free State and the famous ADH telescope was dismantled. Some of its optical parts, including a 32-inch prism, were transferred to Dunsink Observatory, Dublin. Andrews then turned his attention to the new international astronomical facilities in Chile, and to available satellite technologies.

In the Irish Astronomical Journal Andrews reported a suspected outburst of a B7 spectral type star in Auriga, BD +31 1048. This enigmatic object was referred to by Guillermo Haro as "Andrews' Star". This was a discovery made in his earliest work on flare stars and solar-related phenomena which he pioneered at Armagh Observatory. Andrews collaborated with several groups in the United Kingdom and United States, especially with D. J. Mullan (Armagh & Bartol Research Inst.), and S.America, Russia, Armenia, Italy and Greece. He cooperated with G.Haro, director at the Tonantzintla Observatory in Mexico on stellar flares in young stellar clusters. Collaboration with W.E.Kunkel (Univ.Texas) and Sir Bernard Lovell at the Jodrell Bank radio telescope led to one of the earliest detections of large radio flares in UV Ceti-type stars, in the dMe star YZ CMi. What Andrews had observed at Armagh in 1968 turns out to have been what is now termed a stellar megaflare.

In 1981 Andrews published from the Armagh Observatory his multi-colour (UBVI) measurements of over 16000 stars in a region rich in flare stars on Schmidt photographic plates, "A Photometric Atlas of the Orion Nebula". He used material from the SRC/UK Schmidt in Australia and the European Southern Observatory (ESO) and the Las Campanas Observatory (Univ. Toronto) in Chile. In the Irish Astronomical Journal he published a "Cyclopaedia of Telescope Makers" in seven parts in the 1990s. From 1984 he was actively engaged in the search for quasi-periodic ultraviolet and infrared variations in flare stars indicative of active regions and stellar rotation. He also collaborated with the Armagh astronomers, C.J.Butler, P.B.Byrne, J.G.Doyle and P.Panagi, and Japanese, Italian, UK and US astronomers, especially J.Linsky, in observations of the chromospheric rotation of RS CVn and BY Dra stars with the International Ultraviolet Explorer satellite. Andrews, now retired, and his wife, Mette, live in Dore, a village on the outskirts of the S.Yorkshire and Derbyshire border, near Sheffield, UK.
