= R Coronae Borealis variable =

Type of eruptive variable star

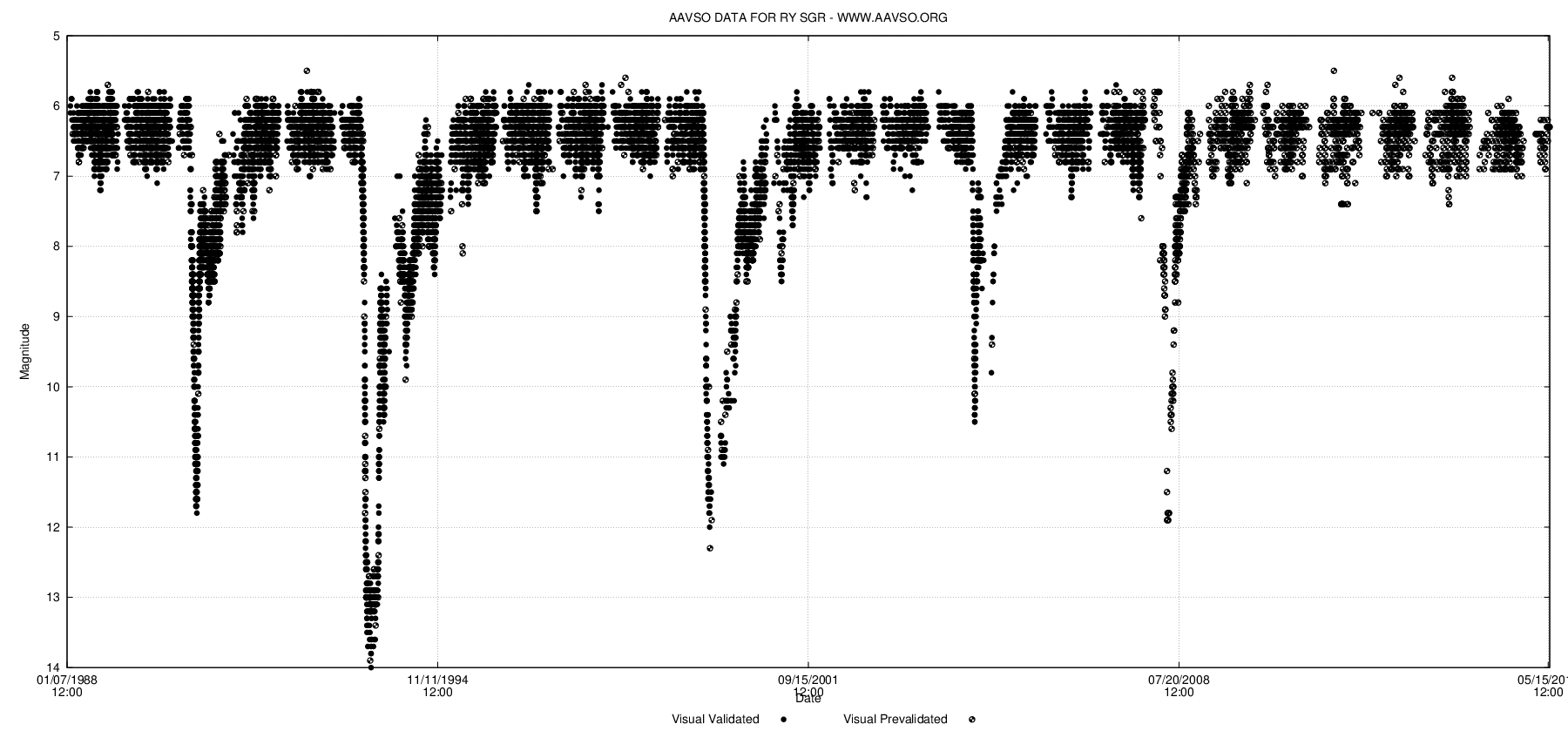
Visual light curve for RY Sagittarii, 1988–2015, showing classic behaviour for this type of variable

An R Coronae Borealis variable (abbreviated RCB, R CrB) is an eruptive variable star that varies in luminosity in two modes, one low amplitude pulsation (a few tenths of a magnitude), and one irregular, unpredictably-sudden fading by 1 to 9 magnitudes. The prototype star R Coronae Borealis was discovered by the English amateur astronomer Edward Pigott in 1795, who first observed the enigmatic fadings of the star. Only about 150 RCB stars are currently known in the Milky Way galaxy while up to 1000 were expected, making this class a very rare kind of star.

It is increasingly suspected that RCB stars – rare hydrogen-deficient and carbon-rich supergiant stars – are the product of mergers of white-dwarfs in the intermediary mass regime (total mass between 0.6 and 1.2 M_{☉}). The fading is caused by condensation of carbon to soot, making the star fade in visible light while measurements in infrared light exhibit no real luminosity decrease. R Coronae Borealis variables are typically supergiant stars in the spectral classes F and G (by convention called "yellow"), with typical C_{2} and CN molecular bands, characteristic of yellow supergiants. RCB star atmospheres do however lack hydrogen by an abundance of 1 part per 1,000 down to 1 part per 1,000,000 relative to helium and other chemical elements, while the universal abundance of hydrogen is about 3 to 1 relative to helium.

== Diversity ==
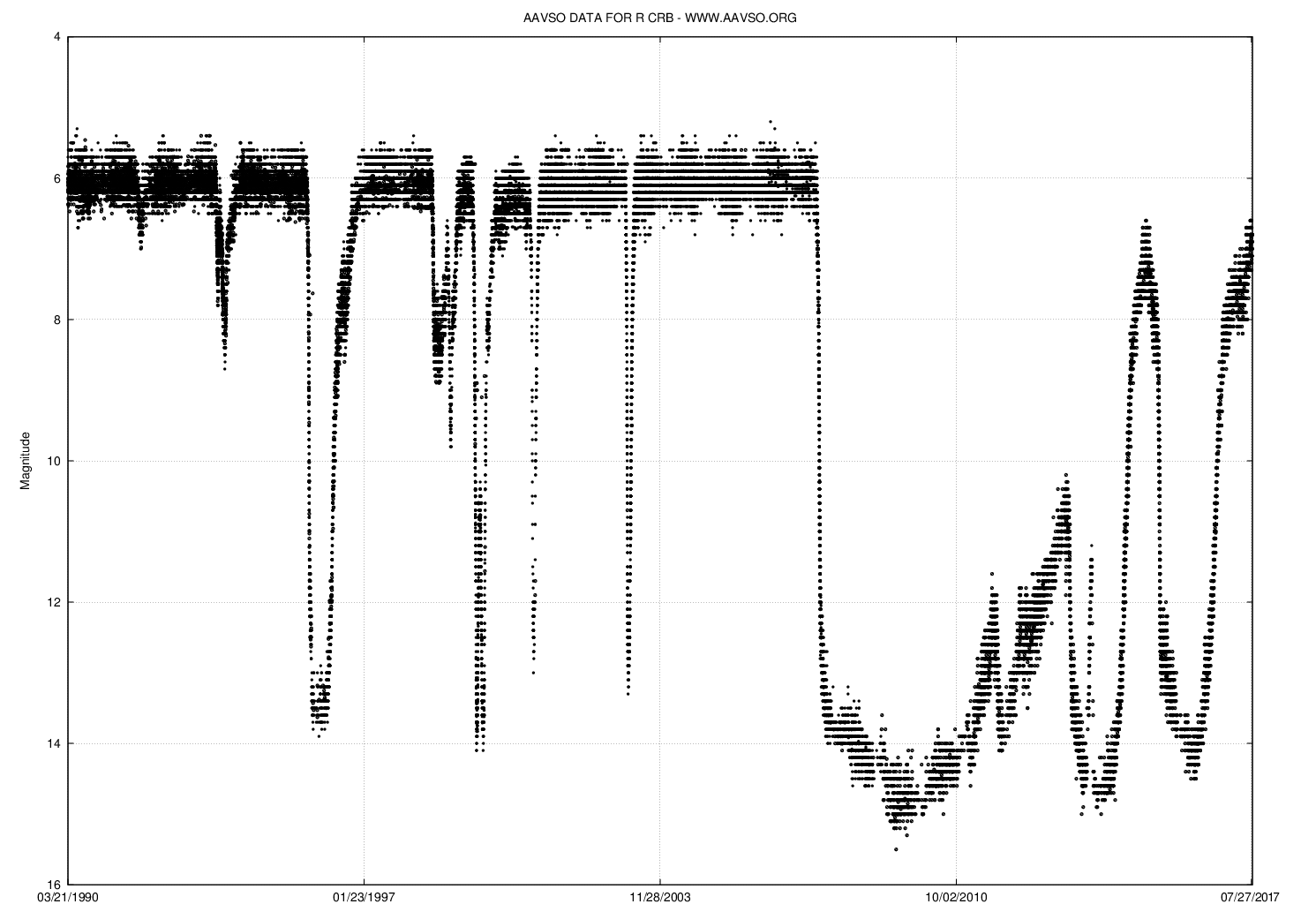
Light curve of R Coronae Borealis from 1990 to 2017, showing the unprecedented deep minimum

There is a considerable variation in spectrum between various RCB specimens. Most of the stars with known spectrum are either F to G class ("yellow") supergiants, or a comparatively cooler C-R type carbon star supergiant. Three of the stars are however of the "blue" B type, for example VZ Sagittarii. Four stars—V854 Cen, V CrA, VZ Sgr, and V3795 Sgr— are unusually and inexplicably poor in iron absorption lines in the spectrum. The constant features are prominent carbon lines, strong atmospheric hydrogen deficiencies, and obviously the intermittent fadings.

The DY Persei variables have been considered a sub-class of R CrB variable, although they are less luminous carbon-rich AGB stars and may be unrelated.

== Physics ==
Two main models for carbon dust formation near the R Coronae Borealis stars have been proposed, one model that presumes the dust forms at a distance of 20 star radii from the center of the star, and one model that presumes that the dust forms in the photosphere of the star. The rationale for the 20 radii formation is that the carbon condensation temperature is 1,500 K, while the photospheric dust model was formulated by the 20 radii model's failure to explain the fast decline of the RCBs' light curves just before reaching minimum. The 20 radii model requires a large and thereby long-time buildup of the obstructing dust cloud, making the fast light decline hard to comprehend.

The alternative theory of photospheric buildup of carbon dust in a 4,500–6,500 K temperature environment could be explained by condensations in the low pressure parts of shock fronts – being detected in the atmosphere of RY Sagittarii – a condensation that causes local runaway cooling, allowing carbon dust to form.

The formation of the stars themselves is also unclear. Standard stellar evolution models do not produce large luminous stars with essentially zero hydrogen. The two main theories to explain these stars are both somewhat exotic, perhaps befitting such rare stars. In one, a merger occurs between two white dwarf stars, one a Helium white dwarf and the other a carbon-oxygen white dwarf. White dwarfs are naturally lacking in hydrogen and the resultant star would also lack that element. The second model postulates a massive convective event at the onset of burning of an outer helium shell, causing the little remaining atmospheric Hydrogen to be turned over into the interior of the star. It is possible that the diversity of R CrB stars is caused by a diversity of formation mechanisms, relating them to extreme helium stars and hydrogen-deficient carbon stars.

== List of stars ==
This list contains all the R CrB stars listed in the GCVS, as well as other notable examples.

Designation (name) (Note: DY Persei is not included although it may be a related type of variable.)	Constellation	Discoverer	Discovery year	Apparent magnitude (Maximum) (Note: (visual magnitude, unless marked (B) (= blue) or (p) (= photographic)))	Apparent magnitude (Minimum)	Range of magnitude	Spectral class	Comment
UX Antliae	Antlia	Kilkenny & Westerhuys	1990	11^{m}.85	<18^{m}.0	>6.15	C	
S Apodis	Apus	Fleming	1896	9^{m}.6	15^{m}.2	5.6	C(R3)	
U Aquarii	Aquarius	Peters	1881	10^{m}.8	18^{m}.2	7.6	C	proposed Thorne–Żytkow object.
UV Cassiopeiae	Cassiopeia	D'Esterre	1913	11^{m}.8	16^{m}.5	4.7	F0Ib-G5Ib	
DY Centauri	Centaurus	Dorrit Hoffleit	1930	12^{m}.0	16^{m}.4	4.4	C-Hd/B5-6Ie	hot RCB and getting hotter. Binary?
UW Centauri	Centaurus	Henrietta Leavitt	1906	9^{m}.1	14^{m}.5	5.4	K	in variable reflection nebula
V504 Centauri	Centaurus	McLeod	1941	12^{m}.0	18^{m}.0	6.0	?	now considered to be an NL/VY Scl variable
V803 Centauri	Centaurus	Elvius	1975	13^{m}.2	17^{m}.7	4.5	pec	now listed as AM CVn variable
V854 Centauri	Centaurus	Dawes	1964	7^{m}.1	15^{m}.2	8.1	Ce	
AE Circini	Circinus	Swope	1931	12^{m}.2	16^{m}.0	3.8	?	symbiotic variable, not RCB
V Coronae Australis	Corona Australis	Evelyn Leland	1896	9^{m}.4	17^{m}.9	7.5	C (R0)	"minority" RCB, iron-deficient
WX Coronae Australis	Corona Australis	Ida Woods	1928	10^{m}.25	<15^{m}.2	>4.95	C (R5)	
R Coronae Borealis	Corona Borealis	Piggott	1795	5^{m}.71	14^{m}.8	9.09	G0Iab:pe	prototype
V482 Cygni	Cygnus	Whitney	1936	11^{m}.8	15^{m}.5	3.7	C-Hd	
LT Draconis	Draco	Sergio Messina	2000	10^{m}.8	19^{m}.0	8.2	K5III	probably not an RCB star
W Mensae	Mensa	W. J. Luyten	1927	13^{m}.4	<18^{m}.3	>5.1	F8:Ip	located in LMC
Y Muscae	Musca	Henrietta Leavitt	1906	10^{m}.5	12^{m}.1	1.6	Fp	
RT Normae	Norma	Cannon	1910	10^{m}.6	16^{m}.3	5.8	C(R)	
RZ Normae	Norma	Gaposchkin	1952	10^{m}.6	13^{m}.0	2.4	C-Hd	
V409 Normae	Norma	Elena V. Kazarovets	2011	11^{m}.8	19^{m}.0	7.2	C(R)	
V2552 Ophiuchi	Ophiuchus	Erica Hesselbach	2002	10^{m}.5	13^{m}.6	3.1	C-Hd	
SV Sagittae	Sagitta	Vladimir Albitsky	1929	11^{m}.5	16^{m}.2	4.7	C0-3,2-3(R2)	
GU Sagittarii	Sagittarius	Luyten	1927	11^{m}.33	15^{m}.0	3.67	C(R0)	
MV Sagittarii	Sagittarius	Ida Woods	1928	12^{m}.0	16^{m}.05	6.05	B2p(HDCe)	hot RCB with metal emission lines
RY Sagittarii	Sagittarius	Markwick	1893	5^{m}.8	14^{m}.0	8.2	G0Iaep	weak emission lines
VZ Sagittarii	Sagittarius	Henrietta Leavitt	1904	10^{m}.8	15^{m}.0	4.2	C	
V618 Sagittarii	Sagittarius	Swope	1935	11^{m}.0	16^{m}.5	5.5	Me	symbiotic variable?
V3795 Sagittarii	Sagittarius	Dorrit Hoffleit	1972	11^{m}.5	15^{m}.5	4.0	pec	
V5639 Sagittarii	Sagittarius	Greaves	2007	11^{m}.2	13^{m}.9	2.7	Ic	
FH Scuti	Scutum	Luyten	1937	13^{m}.4	16^{m}.8	3.4	?	
SU Tauri	Taurus	Cannon	1908	9^{m}.1	16^{m}.86	7.76	G0-1Iep	
RS Telescopii	Telescopium	Evelyn Leland	1910	9^{m}.6	16^{m}.5	6.9	C (R4)	
Z Ursae Minoris	Ursa Minor	Priscilla Benson	1994	10^{m}.8	19^{m}.0	8.2	C	

== See also ==
- Thorne–Żytkow object
