= W Mensae =

Variable star in the constellation Mensa

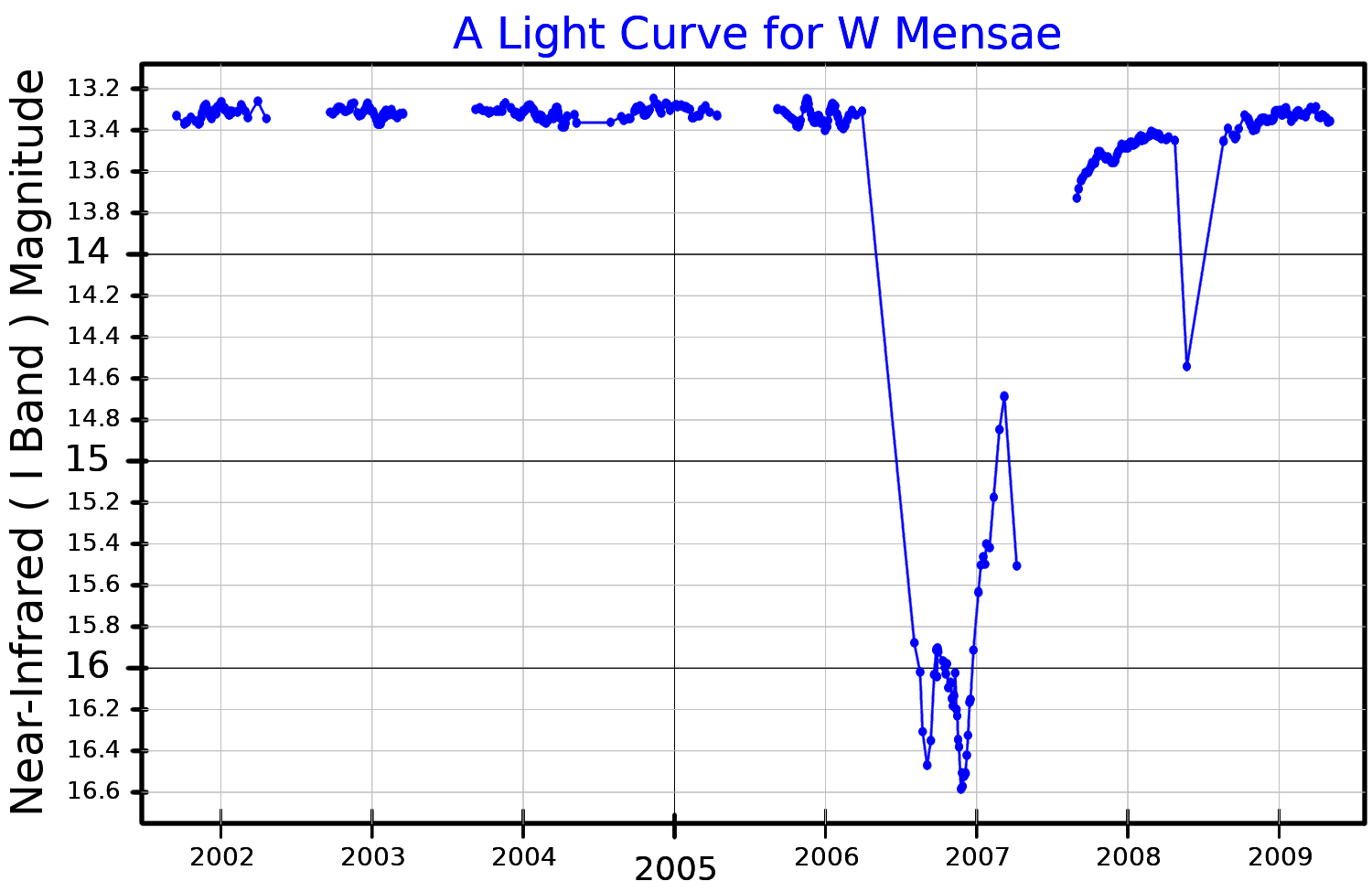
- A near-infrared (I band) light curve for W Mensae, plotted from OGLE data

Observation data Epoch J2000.0 Equinox J2000.0
- Constellation: Mensa
- Right ascension: 05^{h} 26^{m} 24.516^{s}
- Declination: −71° 11′ 11.79″
- Apparent magnitude (V): 13.90 (13.4_{pg} - <18.3_{pg})

Characteristics
- Spectral type: F5Ipec
- Apparent magnitude (R): 13.700
- Apparent magnitude (J): 13.032
- Apparent magnitude (H): 12.831
- Apparent magnitude (K): 12.296
- Apparent magnitude (L (3.4um)): 9.998±0.022
- Apparent magnitude (M (4.6um)): 9.138±0.020
- Apparent magnitude (Q (22um)): 7.577±0.078
- U−B color index: −0.24
- B−V color index: +0.45
- J−H color index: 0.201
- J−K color index: 0.736
- Variable type: R CrB

Astrometry
Radial velocity (R_{v})	+260 km/s
Distance	~168,000 ly (~51,500 pc)
Absolute magnitude (M_{V})	−4.8

Details
Radius	61 R_{☉}
Luminosity	7,700 L_{☉}
Surface gravity (log g)	0.5 cgs
Temperature	6,700 K

Other designations
- W Mensae, HV 966, RMC 102, 2MASS J05262451-7111117, AAVSO 0527-71, OGLE LMC-RCB-13

Database references
SIMBAD	data

W Mensae (W Men) is an unusual yellow supergiant star in the Large Magellanic Cloud in the southern constellation Mensa. It is an R Coronae Borealis variable and periodically decreases in brightness by several magnitudes.

W Men is very distant, being located in the neighboring galaxy Large Magellanic Cloud, where it lies on the southern metal-deficient edge. Despite its high luminosity, the star has a maximum apparent brightness of +13.8^{m}, too dim to be visible in a small telescope. Its radius has been calculated to be 61 times that of the Sun.

The variability of W Men was discovered in 1927 by W. J. Luyten. It belongs to the very rare R Coronae Borealis class of variables which are often called "inverse novae" since they experience occasional very large drops in brightness. At minimum brightness, W Men has a photographic (blue) magnitude less than +18.3, being undetectable on photographic plates at the time. The drop in brightness is less pronounced at longer wavelengths, and the overall luminosity of the star is thought to be largely unchanged. The variations are caused by condensation of dust which temporarily obscures the star. Short wavelengths of light are absorbed and re-emitted as infra-red. Many R CrB variables show small amplitude pulsations and W Mensae has a pulsation period of approximately 67 days.
