= V Coronae Australis =

Variable star in the constellation Corona Australis

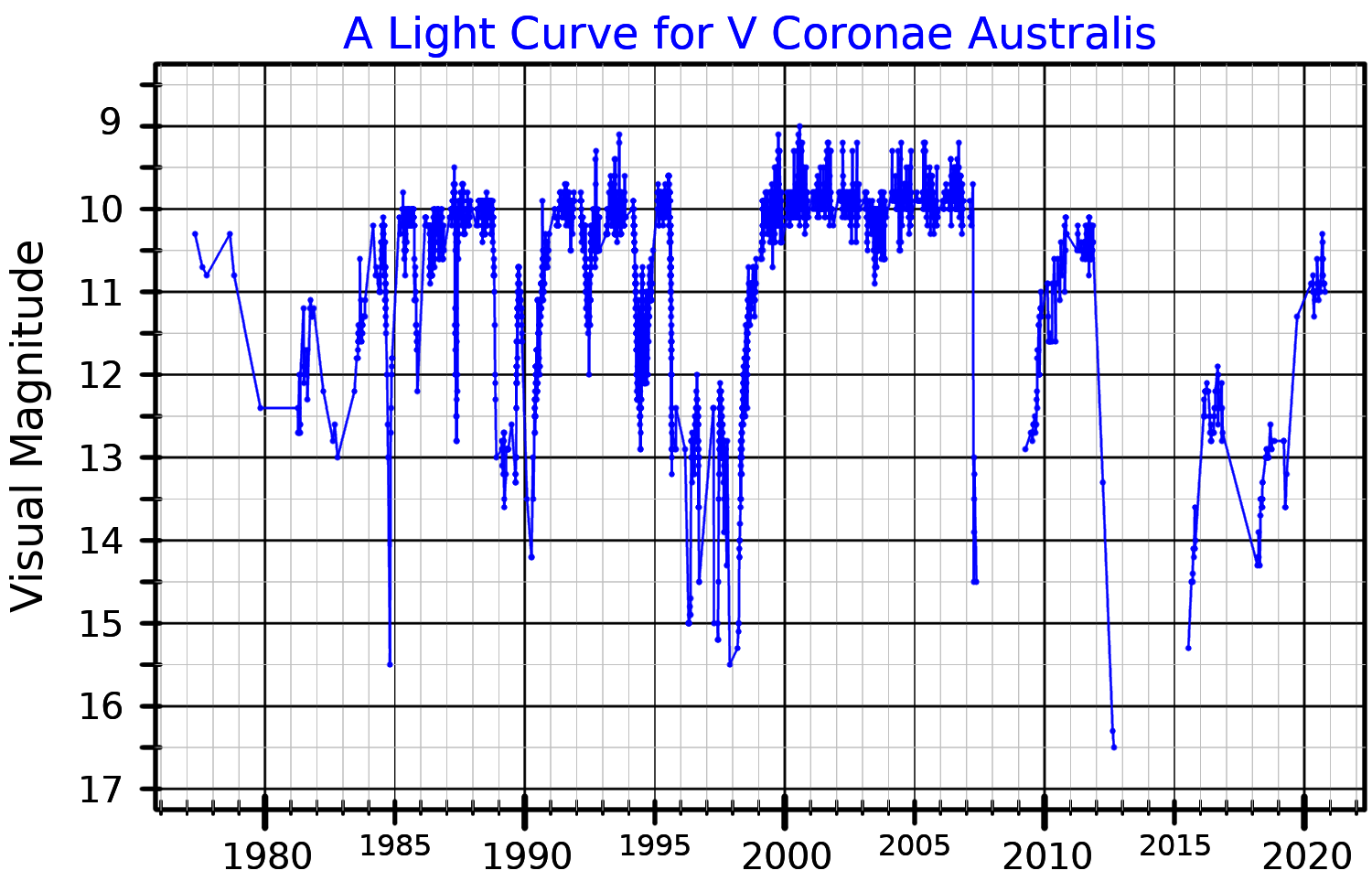
- A visual band light curve for V Coronae Australis, from AAVSO data

Observation data Epoch J2000.0 Equinox J2000.0 (ICRS)
- Constellation: Corona Australis
- Right ascension: 18^{h} 47^{m} 32.30962^{s}
- Declination: −38° 09′ 32.3079″
- Apparent magnitude (V): 9.4 - 17.9

Characteristics
- Spectral type: R0
- Variable type: R CrB

Astrometry
Proper motion (μ)	RA: −1.104 mas/yr Dec.: −7.531 mas/yr
Parallax (π)	−0.3793±0.1513 mas
Distance	5,500 pc

Details
Mass	0.6 M_{☉}
Luminosity	6,550 L_{☉}
Surface gravity (log g)	0.5 cgs
Temperature	6,250 K

Other designations
- V CrA, CD−38°13089, HD 173539, HIP 92207

Database references
SIMBAD	data

V Coronae Australis (V CrA) is a R Coronae Borealis variable (RCB) star in the constellation Corona Australis. These are extremely hydrogen-deficient supergiants thought to have arisen as the result of the merger of two white dwarfs; fewer than 100 have been discovered as of 2012. V Coronae Australis dimmed in brightness from 1994 to 1998.

In 1896 it was announced that Evelyn Leland and Williamina Fleming had discovered that the star is a variable star. The visual apparent magnitude of V CrA has been observed to vary between magnitudes 9.4 and 17.9. A maximum magnitude of 8.3 has been estimated from photographic plates. It has around 60% the mass of the Sun and an effective (surface) temperature of around 6250 K.

The spectral class of R0 is typical of a carbon star, but the RCB stars are considered to a separate class of hydrogen-deficient stars, not normal asymptotic giant branch giants.
