= HD 124448 =

Star in the constellation Centaurus

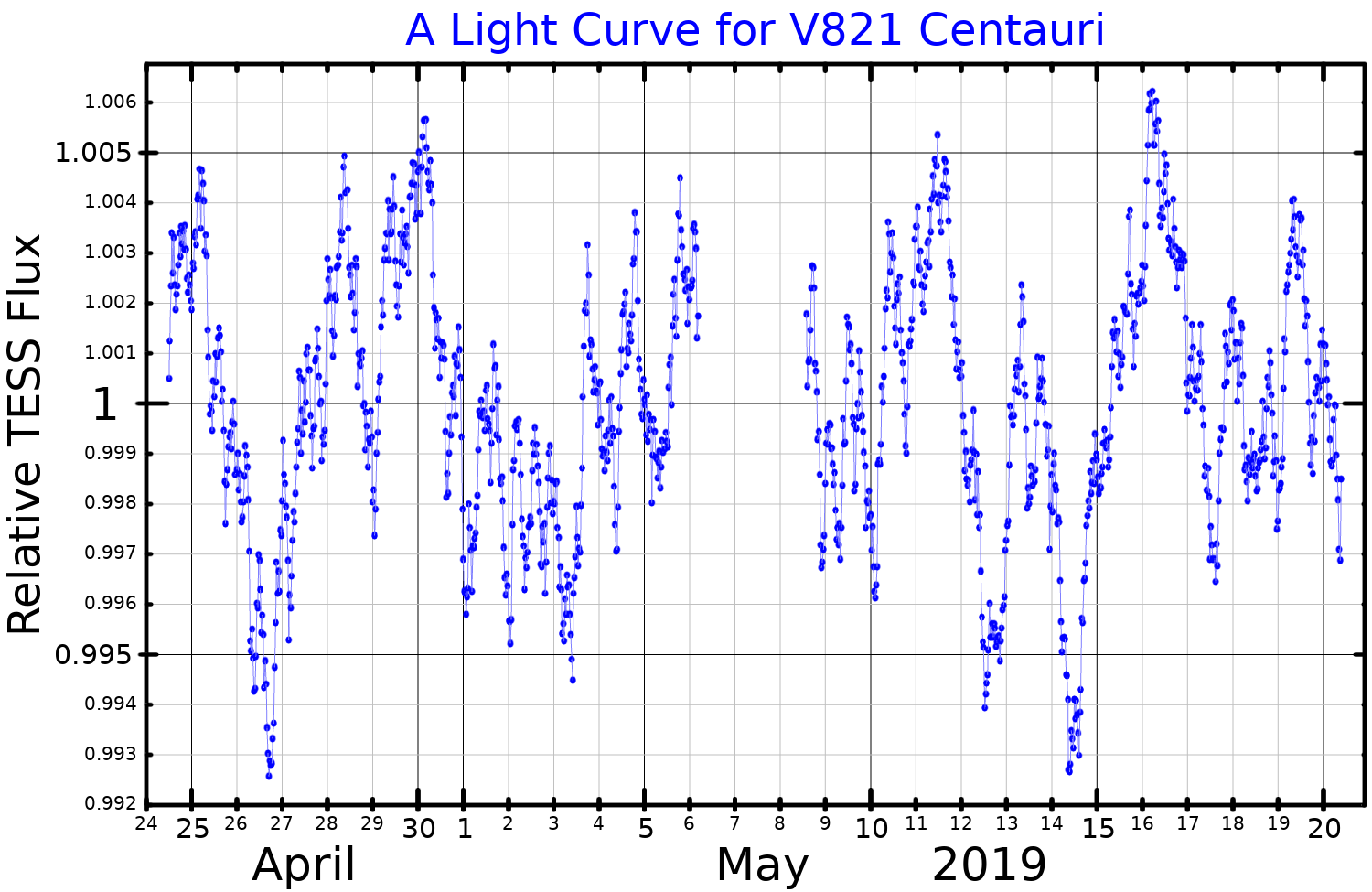
- A light curve for V821 Centauri, plotted from TESS data. Adapted from Jeffery et al. (2020)

Observation data Epoch J2000 Equinox ICRS
- Constellation: Centaurus
- Right ascension: 14^{h} 14^{m} 58.6293^{s}
- Declination: −46° 17′ 19.294″
- Apparent magnitude (V): 9.94 - 10.03

Characteristics
- Spectral type: B(p)
- Variable type: PV Tel?

Astrometry
Proper motion (μ)	RA: −6.544±0.038 mas/yr Dec.: −0.049±0.032 mas/yr
Parallax (π)	0.6240±0.0312 mas
Distance	5,200 ± 300 ly (1,600 ± 80 pc)

Details
Mass	6.7 M_{☉}
Radius	5.2 R_{☉}
Luminosity	1,282 L_{☉}
Surface gravity (log g)	3.86 cgs
Temperature	15,481 K
Metallicity [Fe/H]	−0.55 dex

Other designations
- V821 Cen, HD 124448, HIP 69619, 2MASS J14145863-4617192

Database references
SIMBAD	data

HD 124448, also called Popper's Star and V821 Centauri, is an extreme helium star in the constellation Centaurus. Discovered by astronomer Daniel Popper, this star has a spectral classification of B2-B3.

Peter M. Corben et al. announced that the star is a variable star, in 1972. It was given its variable star designation, V821 Centauri, in 1981.
