= Extreme helium star =

Low-mass supergiant that is almost devoid of hydrogen

An extreme helium star (abbreviated EHe) is a low-mass supergiant that is almost devoid of hydrogen, the most common chemical element of the Universe. Since there are no known conditions where stars devoid of hydrogen can be formed from molecular clouds, it is theorized that they are the product of the mergers of helium-core and carbon-oxygen core white dwarfs.

== Properties ==
Extreme helium stars form a sub-group within the broader category of hydrogen-deficient stars. The latter includes cool carbon stars like R Coronae Borealis variables, helium-rich spectral class O or B stars, population I Wolf–Rayet stars, AM CVn stars, white dwarfs of spectral type WC, and transition stars like PG 1159.

The first known extreme helium star, HD 124448, was discovered in 1942 by Daniel M. Popper at the McDonald Observatory near Fort Davis, Texas, United States. This star displayed no lines of hydrogen in its spectrum, but strong helium lines as well as the presence of carbon and oxygen. The second, PV Telescopii, was discovered in 1952, and the class of PV Telescopii variables are all extreme helium stars. By 1996 a total of 25 candidates had been found. (This list was narrowed to 21 by 2006.) A common characteristic of these stars is that the abundance ratio of carbon to helium is always in the range of 0.3 to 1%. This is despite wide variation of other abundance ratios in EHe stars.

The known extreme helium stars are supergiants where hydrogen is underabundant by a factor of 10,000 or more. The surface temperatures of these stars range from 9,000–35,000 K. They are primarily composed of helium, with the second most abundant element, carbon, forming about one atom per 100 atoms of helium. The chemical composition of these stars implies that they have undergone both hydrogen and helium burning at some stage of their evolution.

== Theoretical models ==
Two possible scenarios were proposed to explain the composition of extreme helium stars.

1. The double-degenerate (DD) model explained the stars as forming in a binary system consisting of a smaller helium white dwarf and a more massive carbon-oxygen white dwarf. Both stars had ceased to produce energy through nuclear fusion and were now compact objects. The emission of gravitational radiation caused their orbit to decay until they merged. If the combined mass does not exceed the Chandrasekhar limit, the helium will accrete onto the C-O dwarf and ignite to form a supergiant. Later this will become an EHe star before cooling to become a white dwarf.
2. The final-flash (FF) model suggested that an EHe star could form as a late evolutionary stage of a star after it had left the asymptotic giant branch. As the star is cooling to form a white dwarf, helium ignites in a shell around the core, causing the outer layers to expand rapidly. If the hydrogen in this envelope is consumed, the star becomes hydrogen-deficient and it contracts to form an EHe.

Examination of element abundances from seven EHe stars agreed with those predicted by the DD model.

== See also ==
- PG 1159 star
- R Coronae Borealis variable
