= List of stars in Telescopium =

This is the list of notable stars in the constellation Telescopium, sorted by decreasing brightness.

Name	B	Var	HD	HIP	RA	Dec	vis. mag.	abs. mag.	Dist. (ly)	Sp. class	Notes
α Tel	α		169467	90422	18^{h} 26^{m} 58.43^{s}	−45° 58′ 06.0″	3.49	−0.93	249	B3IV	
ζ Tel	ζ		169767	90568	18^{h} 28^{m} 49.74^{s}	−49° 04′ 12.1″	4.10	1.14	127	G8/K0III	
ε Tel	ε		166063	89112	18^{h} 11^{m} 13.78^{s}	−45° 57′ 15.6″	4.52	−0.97	409	G5III	
λ Tel	λ		175510	93148	18^{h} 58^{m} 27.76^{s}	−52° 56′ 19.0″	4.85	−1.21	531	A0V	
ι Tel	ι		184127	96341	19^{h} 35^{m} 12.99^{s}	−48° 05′ 56.8″	4.88	−0.55	398	G9III	
δ^{1} Tel	δ^{1}		170465	90830	18^{h} 31^{m} 45.44^{s}	−45° 54′ 53.1″	4.92	−2.02	795	B6IV	
ξ Tel	ξ		190421	99120	20^{h} 07^{m} 23.17^{s}	−52° 52′ 50.9″	4.93	−3.00	1254	M1II	slow irregular variable, V_{max} = 4.89^{m}, V_{min} = 4.94^{m}
η Tel	η		181296	95261	19^{h} 22^{m} 51.18^{s}	−54° 25′ 25.4″	5.03	1.64	155	A0Vn	has a debris disk and brown dwarf companion
δ^{2} Tel	δ^{2}		170523	90853	18^{h} 32^{m} 01.94^{s}	−45° 45′ 26.5″	5.07	−2.60	1116	B3III	
ρ Tel	ρ		177171	93815	19^{h} 06^{m} 19.92^{s}	−52° 20′ 26.3″	5.17	1.57	171	F7V	variable star, ΔV = 0.011^{m}, P = 4.73687 d
κ Tel	κ		174295	92646	18^{h} 52^{m} 39.61^{s}	−52° 06′ 25.7″	5.18	0.41	293	G8/K0III	
ν Tel	ν		186543	97421	19^{h} 48^{m} 01.10^{s}	−56° 21′ 44.2″	5.33	1.75	170	A9Vn	
QV Tel		QV	167128	89605	18^{h} 17^{m} 07.54^{s}	−56° 01′ 24.0″	5.36	−1.43	743	B3IIIpe	
HD 179886			179886	94712	19^{h} 16^{m} 21.74^{s}	−45° 27′ 57.8″	5.38	−0.69	534	K3III	
HD 169405			169405	90414	18^{h} 26^{m} 54.01^{s}	−48° 07′ 01.6″	5.44	−0.61	529	K0/K1III+..	
HD 174387			174387	92630	18^{h} 52^{m} 27.21^{s}	−46° 35′ 42.4″	5.51	−1.83	956	M0III	suspected variable
PW Tel		PW	183806	96178	19^{h} 33^{m} 21.63^{s}	−45° 16′ 18.1″	5.61	−0.04	436	A0p	α² CVn variable, ΔV = 0.011^{m}, P = 2.9213 d
HD 191829	(π) (Note: Labelled Pi Indi by Bode in an expanded version of Indus, though this is no longer used)		191829	99747	20^{h} 14^{m} 19.01^{s}	−52° 26′ 44.3″	5.65	−1.59	916	K4III	
HD 170069	τ		170069	90662	18^{h} 29^{m} 55.92^{s}	−47° 13′ 13.8″	5.69	−0.61	594	K2III	Labelled τ by Lacaille but designation dropped by Gould
HD 182509			182509	95690	19^{h} 27^{m} 48.12^{s}	−54° 19′ 31.1″	5.70	−0.55	579	K4III	
HD 183552			183552	96141	19^{h} 32^{m} 53.79^{s}	−53° 11′ 08.2″	5.76	0.29	405	Am	
HD 187420			187420	97816	19^{h} 52^{m} 37.70^{s}	−54° 58′ 15.7″	5.76	0.58	354	G8/K0III	
HD 173791			173791	92367	18^{h} 49^{m} 27.34^{s}	−45° 48′ 36.4″	5.80	0.20	360	G8III	
HD 171819			171819	91461	18^{h} 39^{m} 14.27^{s}	−47° 54′ 35.3″	5.84	0.82	329	A3V	
HD 187086			187086	97598	19^{h} 50^{m} 14.05^{s}	−47° 33′ 26.5″	5.91	−1.76	1116	M1III	variable star, ΔV = 0.023^{m}, P = 7.68049 d
HD 176664			176664	93624	19^{h} 03^{m} 57.52^{s}	−51° 01′ 05.7″	5.93	1.17	292	K0/K1III	
HD 177406			177406	93862	19^{h} 06^{m} 55.60^{s}	−48° 17′ 56.8″	5.95	0.80	349	A0V	
GC 25149			169326		18^{h} 27^{m} 04.22^{s}	−53° 06′ 36.8″	5.96	0.06	494	K2III	Brightest non-variable single * wNoHR(YBSCat) NoHRsup, Gould, m6 maps <2001
HD 167257			167257	89597	18^{h} 17^{m} 00.92^{s}	−51° 04′ 05.7″	6.06	0.85	359	B9V	
HD 166006	φ (Note: Labelled Phi Telescopii (φ Tel/φ Telescopii) by Bode in his Uranographia)		166006	89096	18^{h} 11^{m} 04.41^{s}	−47° 30′ 47.0″	6.07	0.18	490	K1III-IV	
HD 178845	χ (Note: Labelled Chi Telescopii (χ Tel/χ Telescopii) by Bode in his Uranographia)		178845	94398	19^{h} 12^{m} 46.10^{s}	−50° 29′ 10.7″	6.12	0.39	457	G8III	
HD 192886			192886	100184	20^{h} 19^{m} 17.68^{s}	−47° 34′ 47.4″	6.13	3.78	96	F5V	
HD 182893			182893	95866	19^{h} 29^{m} 52.59^{s}	−55° 26′ 29.7″	6.14	0.93	359	K0/K1III	
HD 174500			174500	92669	18^{h} 52^{m} 59.90^{s}	−46° 35′ 10.9″	6.17	−0.79	803	A1IV/V	
HD 174474			174474	92676	18^{h} 53^{m} 02.36^{s}	−48° 21′ 38.6″	6.17	1.43	290	A2V	
HD 189080			189080	98482	20^{h} 00^{m} 25.40^{s}	−49° 21′ 03.4″	6.18	1.35	302	K0III	
HD 170873			170873	91062	18^{h} 34^{m} 31.13^{s}	−52° 53′ 29.1″	6.21	0.08	550	K2III	
HD 173047			173047	92072	18^{h} 45^{m} 55.99^{s}	−50° 52′ 21.6″	6.24	−1.64	1226	B8/B9II	
QQ Tel		QQ	185139	96721	19^{h} 39^{m} 41.80^{s}	−45° 16′ 42.8″	6.24	1.25	324	Am	δ Sct variable
HD 185075			185075	96781	19^{h} 40^{m} 18.64^{s}	−54° 25′ 03.9″	6.24	0.97	370	K0III	
HD 190422			190422	99137	20^{h} 07^{m} 35.07^{s}	−55° 00′ 58.0″	6.26	4.43	76	F8V	
HD 193307			193307	100412	20^{h} 21^{m} 41.36^{s}	−49° 59′ 55.7″	6.26	3.71	106	G2IV-V	
HD 186756			186756	97491	19^{h} 48^{m} 55.07^{s}	−52° 53′ 16.8″	6.27	−0.64	786	K1III	
HD 193002	(ξ) (Note: Labelled Xi Indi (ξ Ind/ξ Indi) by Bode in his Uranographia)		193002	100300	20^{h} 20^{m} 32.30^{s}	−55° 03′ 02.9″	6.27	−0.71	811	M0/M1III	suspected variable
HD 192827			192827	100151	20^{h} 18^{m} 55.97^{s}	−47° 42′ 38.8″	6.28	−0.30	675	M1III	suspected variable
HD 177365			177365	93860	19^{h} 06^{m} 54.81^{s}	−50° 19′ 23.0″	6.29	0.28	520	B9V	
μ Tel	μ		183028	95932	19^{h} 30^{m} 34.57^{s}	−55° 06′ 36.1″	6.29	3.47	120	F5V	
HD 174430			174430	92687	18^{h} 53^{m} 12.00^{s}	−51° 55′ 53.1″	6.30	−2.45	1831	B4III	
HD 180134			180134	94858	19^{h} 18^{m} 09.76^{s}	−53° 23′ 12.8″	6.36	3.07	149	F7V	
HD 181295			181295	95239	19^{h} 22^{m} 37.68^{s}	−51° 13′ 52.5″	6.42	2.16	232	F0V	
HD 177693			177693	94054	19^{h} 08^{m} 52.27^{s}	−55° 43′ 12.5″	6.44	0.97	405	K1IV	
HD 168871			168871	90223	18^{h} 24^{m} 33.11^{s}	−49° 39′ 09.0″	6.45	4.20	92	G2V	
RX Tel		RX	177456		19^{h} 06^{m} 58.21^{s}	−48° 58′ 13.6″	6.45–7.47		7136^{+1783}_{−1245}	M3Iab/Ib	slow irregular variable, V_{max} = 6.45^{m}, V_{min} = 7.47^{m}, one of the largest known stars
HD 190879			190879	99270	20^{h} 09^{m} 03.81^{s}	−47° 04′ 04.0″	6.46	0.39	533	K5III	
HD 172223			172223	91662	18^{h} 41^{m} 30.69^{s}	−48° 05′ 39.9″	6.47	0.78	447	K3III	suspected variable, ΔV = 0.05^{m}
HD 190580			190580	99188	20^{h} 08^{m} 09.57^{s}	−52° 34′ 39.9″	6.47	2.66	188	G3V	
HD 191732			191732	99666	20^{h} 13^{m} 32.38^{s}	−47° 42′ 47.3″	6.47	0.77	449	K2III	
HD 187421			187421	97819	19^{h} 52^{m} 39.11^{s}	−54° 58′ 35.2″	6.50	1.86	276	A2V	
HD 181327			181327	95270	19^{h} 22^{m} 58.94^{s}	−54° 32′ 17.0″	7.04		168.9	F6V	may have an analogue to the Kuiper belt
BL Tel		BL	177300	93844	19^{h} 06^{m} 38.11^{s}	−51° 25′ 03.2″	7.10			F0Iab/Ib	Algol and semiregular variable, V_{max} = 7.09^{m}, V_{min} = 9.08^{m}, P = 778.0 d
HD 191760			191760	99661	20^{h} 13^{m} 26.75^{s}	−46° 12′ 03.7″	8.26		277	G3IV/V	two unconfirmed planets
HO Tel		HO	187418	97756	19^{h} 51^{m} 58.93^{s}	−46° 51′ 42.4″	8.31		1090	A7IIIm...	Algol variable, V_{max} = 8.22^{m}, V_{min} = 8.73^{m}, P = 1.613101 d
PZ Tel		PZ	174429	92680	18^{h} 53^{m} 05.88^{s}	−50° 10′ 49.9″	8.34		167.9	G9IV	T Tau star, ΔV = 0.032^{m}, P = 0.9457 d
HD 176387		MT	176387	93476	19^{h} 02^{m} 12^{s}	−46° 39′ 12.1″	8.94		2810	A0w	RR Lyr variable, V_{max} = 8.70^{m}, V_{min} = 9.25^{m}, P = 0.3169011 d
HD 168476		PV	168476	90099	18^{h} 23^{m} 14.66^{s}	−56° 37′ 44.2″	9.30	-5.47	7600	B5p	prototype PV Tel variable, V_{max} = 9.24^{m}, V_{min} = 9.40^{m}
RS Tel		RS		89739	18^{h} 18^{m} 51.22^{s}	−46° 32′ 53.4″	9.6		876	Rv...	R CrB variable, V_{max} = 9.6^{m}, V_{min} = <16.5^{m}, P = 48.6 d
KELT-10					18^{h} 58^{m} 11.61^{s}	−47° 00′ 11.91″	10.62	4.23	618	G0V	has a planet (b)
RR Tel		RR			20^{h} 04^{m} 18.54^{s}	−55° 43′ 33.2″	10.81		8500	M5III+WD	symbiotic nova
Gliese 754					19^{h} 20^{m} 48.0^{s}	−45° 33′ 28.3″	12.23		19.3	M4.5	
KK Tel		KK			20^{h} 28^{m} 30.46^{s}	−52° 18′ 45.6″	13.5				SU UMa variable, V_{max} = 13.5^{m}, V_{min} = 19.6^{m}, P = 0.0845 d
EC 20058-5234		QU			20^{h} 09^{m} 40.1^{s}	−52° 25′ 17″	14.93			DB	V777 Her variable, ΔV = 0.05^{m}, P = 0.00297287 d
QS Tel		QS			19^{h} 38^{m} 35.81^{s}	−46° 12′ 57.0″	15.25			CV	AM Her variable, V_{max} = 15.25^{m}, V_{min} = 17.4^{m}, P = 0.097187 d
Table legend: • Name = Proper name • B = Bayer designation • F or/and G. = Flamsteed designation or Gould designation • Var = Variable star designation • HD = Henry Draper Catalogue designation number • HIP = Hipparcos Catalogue designation number • RA = Right ascension for the Epoch/Equinox J2000.0 • Dec = Declination for the Epoch/Equinox J2000.0 • vis. mag. = visual magnitude (m or m_{v}), also known as apparent magnitude • abs. mag. = absolute magnitude (M_{v}) • Dist. (ly) = Distance in light-years from Earth • Sp. class = Spectral class of the star in the stellar classification system • Notes = Common name(s) or alternate name(s); comments; notable properties [for example: multiple star status, range of variability if it is a variable star, exoplanets, etc.]

== See also ==
- List of stars by constellation
