= List of star systems within 75–80 light-years =

This is a list of star systems within 75–80 light years of Earth.

The closest B-type star, Regulus, is in this list.

== List ==
Key
#	Visible to the unaided eye
$	Bright star (absolute magnitude of +8.5 or brighter)
‡	White dwarf
§	Brown dwarf or sub-brown dwarf
*	Nearest in constellation

System	Star or (sub-) brown dwarf	Distance (ly)	Constellation	Coordinates: RA, Dec (Ep J2000, Eq J2000)	Stellar class	Apparent magnitude (V)	Parallax (mas)	Notes and additional references
WISE 0305+3954		75.0			T6			
HIP 12961 (Koeia)		75 ± 3	Eridanus	02^{h} 46^{m} 42.8869^{s} −23° 05′ 11.802″	M0V	9.7		has 1 planet
Alpha Coronae Borealis (Alphecca)	A$	75.0 ± 0.5	Corona Borealis	15^{h} 34^{m} 41.268^{s} +26° 42′ 52.89″	A0V	2.21- 2.32#		
Alpha Coronae Borealis (Alphecca)	B	75.0 ± 0.5	Corona Borealis	15^{h} 34^{m} 41.268^{s} +26° 42′ 52.89″	G5V			
Delta Herculis (Sarin)$		75.1 ± 0.3	Hercules	17^{h} 15^{m} 01.9106^{s} +24° 50′ 21.135″	A3IV	3.12		
HD 212168		75.17	Octans	22^{h} 25^{m} 51.15504^{s} −75° 00′ 56.4763″	G3IV			
Chi Ceti		75.6 ± 0.5	Cetus	01^{h} 49^{m} 35.10277^{s} −10° 41′ 11.0719″	F3III	4.66		
Gamma Tucanae$		75.20	Tucana	23^{h} 17^{m} 25.77222^{s} −58° 14′ 08.6287″	F4V	3.99#		
Omega Draconis		75.6 ± 0.3	Draco	17^{h} 36^{m} 57.09431^{s} +68° 45′ 28.6815″	F5V	4.80		
Alpha² Librae (Zubenelgenubi)$		75.8 ± 0.3	Libra	14^{h} 50^{m} 41.18097^{s} −15° 59′ 50.0482″	kA2hA5mA4 IV-V	2.74#		
HD 101177	A	75.83			G0V			
HD 101177	B	75.83			K2V			
Sigma Coronae Borealis	Ca	76.1 ± 0.7	Corona Borealis	16^{h} 14^{m} 40.854^{s} +33° 51′ 31.02″	M2.5V	12.22		
Sigma Coronae Borealis	Cb	76.1 ± 0.7	Corona Borealis	16^{h} 14^{m} 40.854^{s} +33° 51′ 31.02″	M			
HD 127334		76.29	Boötes	14^{h} 29^{m} 36.80877^{s} +41° 47′ 45.2854″	G5VCH0.3	6.36		
Omega Sagittarii (Terebellum)		76.4 ± 1	Sagittarius	19^{h} 55^{m} 50.36255^{s} −26° 17′ 57.6933″	G5IV	4.70		
Gliese 7		76.47			M0V			
HD 1461		76.5 ± 0.1	Cetus	00^{h} 18^{m} 41.8677^{s} −08° 03′ 10.804″	G3VFe0.5	6.47		has 2 confirmed planets and 2 candidates
64 Piscium	A	76.5 ± 0.5	Pisces	00^{h} 48^{m} 58.70805^{s} +16° 56′ 26.3132″	F8V	5.07		
64 Piscium	B	76.5 ± 0.5	Pisces	00^{h} 48^{m} 58.70805^{s} +16° 56′ 26.3132″	F8V			
HD 167425		76.5 ± 0.1			F9V	6.19		
HD 42618		76.65	Orion	06^{h} 12^{m} 00.567^{s} +06° 46′ 59.06″	G4V			has 1 confirmed planet
Zeta Serpentis		76.8 ± 0.6	Serpens	18^{h} 00^{m} 29.0^{s} −03° 41′ 25″	F2V	4.61		
2MASS J08304878+0128311		77			T4.5			
EX Ceti		77	Cetus		G5V	7.9		
HIP 70849		77	Lupus	14^{h} 29^{m} 18.56436^{s} −46° 27′ 49.7378″	K7Vk	10.36		
Mu² Cancri		77.0	Cancer	08^{h} 07^{m} 45.856^{s} +21° 34′ 54.53″	G2IV	5.30		
HD 214953		77.0			G0			
HD 26491		77.07			G3V			
88 Leonis	A	77.2	Leo	11^{h} 31^{m} 44.94416^{s} +14° 21′ 52.2107″	F9.5V	6.27/9.22		
88 Leonis	B	77.2	Leo	11^{h} 31^{m} 44.94416^{s} +14° 21′ 52.2107″	G5			
KU Librae		77.23	Libra	14^{h} 50^{m} 41.18097^{s} −15° 59′ 50.0482″	G8V			
WISE 0135+1715		77.3			T6			
Kappa Phoenicis		77.7 ± 0.3	Phoenix	00^{h} 26^{m} 12.20183^{s} −43° 40′ 47.3929″	A5IVn	3.94		
23 Ursae Majoris		77.7 ± 0.3	Ursa Major	09^{h} 31^{m} 31.70873^{s} +63° 03′ 42.7013″	F0IV	3.65		
HD 202628		77.73 ± 0.08	Microscopium	21^{h} 18^{m} 27.26962^{s} −43° 20′ 04.7431″	G1.5V	6.74		has 1 candidate planet and protoplanetary disc
KOBE-1		77.89 ± 0.04	Pisces		K7V			Has two confirmed exoplanet (KOBE-1b & c).
27 Cygni		78.1 ± 0.2	Cygnus	20^{h} 06^{m} 21.76743^{s} +35° 58′ 20.8875″	G8.5IVa	5.38		
Lambda Sagittarii (Kaus Borealis)$		78.2	Sagittarius	18^{h} 27^{m} 58.24072^{s} −25° 25′ 18.1146″	K0IV	2.82#		
WISE 0733+7544		78.3			T6			
HD 134060		78.4	Circinius	15^{h} 10^{m} 44.74301^{s} −61° 25′ 20.3607″	G0V Fe+0.4 or G3IV	6.29		has 2 known planets
HD 3765		78.5	Andromeda	00^{h} 40^{m} 49.270^{s} +40° 11′ 13.82″	K2V	7.36		has 1 planet
HD 190422		78.6	Telescopium	20^{h} 07^{m} 35.09061^{s} −55° 00′ 57.6492″	F8V	6.26		
Eta Indi		78.8 ± 0.5	Indus	20^{h} 44^{m} 02.33404^{s} −51° 55′ 15.4970″	A9IV	4.52		
Wolf 1106		78.84			sdM1.5			
12 Persei	A	78.9 ± 0.8	Perseus	02^{h} 42^{m} 14.91569^{s} +40° 11′ 38.1898″	F9V			
12 Persei	B	78.9 ± 0.8	Perseus	02^{h} 42^{m} 14.91569^{s} +40° 11′ 38.1898″	F			
2MASSW J1728114+394859	A	79			L5			Binary, 3.7 AUs separated
2MASSW J1728114+394859	B	79			L7			Binary, 3.7 AUs separated
HD 62644		79			G5IV	5.04		
HD 121560		79			F6V	6.16		
Iota Leonis	A	79 ± 2	Leo	11^{h} 23^{m} 55.45273^{s} +10° 31′ 46.2195″	F3IV	4.00		
Iota Leonis	B	79 ± 2	Leo	11^{h} 23^{m} 55.45273^{s} +10° 31′ 46.2195″	GV			
WISE 1019+6529	A	79 ± 3	Ursa Major	10^{h} 19^{m} 05.75^{s} +65° 29′ 52.70″	T5.5			Radio emission
WISE 1019+6529	B	79 ± 3	Ursa Major	10^{h} 19^{m} 05.75^{s} +65° 29′ 52.70″	T7			Radio emission
Regulus (Alpha Leonis)	B	79.02 ± 0.05	Leo	10^{h} 08^{m} 12.788^{s} +11° 59′ 49.06″	K2V	8.13/13.50		
Regulus (Alpha Leonis)	C	79.02 ± 0.05	Leo	10^{h} 08^{m} 12.788^{s} +11° 59′ 49.06″	M4V			
HD 76653		79.1 ± 0.2	Vela	08^{h} 55^{m} 11.782^{s} −54° 57′ 56.77″	F6V	5.71		
Regulus (Alpha Leonis)	A$	79.3 ± 0.7	Leo	10^{h} 08^{m} 22.311^{s} +11° 58′ 01.95″	B8IV	1.40#		The closest B-type star.
Regulus (Alpha Leonis)	Ab	79.3 ± 0.7	Leo	10^{h} 08^{m} 22.311^{s} +11° 58′ 01.95″	D			The closest B-type star.
MT Pegasi		79.31 ± 0.09	Pegasus	23^{h} 03^{m} 04.977^{s} +20° 55′ 06.86″	G1V	6.61		
HD 156668		79.34 ± 0.03	Herculus	17^{h} 17^{m} 40.48961^{s} +29° 13′ 38.0184″	K3V	8.24		has 2 planets
GJ 2097		79.4			M2V			
37 Ceti		79.49	Cetus	01^{h} 14^{m} 23.97^{s} −07° 55′ 24.6″	F5V	5.14		
BZ Ceti		79.55	Cetus		K2.5Vk			
7 Andromedae (Honores)		79.6 ± 0.4	Andromeda	23^{h} 12^{m} 33.00351^{s} +49° 24′ 22.3459″	F1V	4.52		
HD 195564		79.6 ± 0.6	Capricornus	20^{h} 32^{m} 23.695^{s} −09° 51′ 12.18″	G2V	5.65		
Merak (Beta Ursae Majoris)$		79.7 ± 0.3	Ursa Major	11^{h} 01^{m} 50.47654^{s} +56° 22′ 56.7339″	A1IVps	2.37#		
System	Star or (sub-) brown dwarf	Distance (ly)	Constellation	Coordinates: RA, Dec (Ep J2000, Eq J2000)	Stellar class	Apparent magnitude (V)	Parallax (mas)	Notes and additional references

== See also ==
- Lists of stars
- List of star systems within 70–75 light-years
- List of star systems within 80–85 light-years
- List of nearest stars and brown dwarfs
