= HD 174430 =

B-type giant in the constellation Telescopium

- Location of HD 174430 and κ Tel (circled)

Observation data Epoch J2000.0 Equinox J2000.0 (ICRS)
- Constellation: Telescopium
- Right ascension: 18^{h} 53^{m} 12.00295^{s}
- Declination: −51° 55′ 53.1748″
- Apparent magnitude (V): 6.29±0.01

Characteristics
- Spectral type: B3/5 III
- B−V color index: −0.09

Astrometry
Radial velocity (R_{v})	−23.0±4.3 km/s
Proper motion (μ)	RA: +2.869 mas/yr Dec.: −12.640 mas/yr
Parallax (π)	2.8731±0.0531 mas
Distance	1,140 ± 20 ly (348 ± 6 pc)
Absolute magnitude (M_{V})	−1.80

Details
Mass	4.05 M_{☉}
Radius	5.72±0.29 R_{☉}
Luminosity	696 L_{☉}
Surface gravity (log g)	3.56 cgs
Temperature	14,824 K
Metallicity [Fe/H]	−0.01 dex
Age	76 Myr

Other designations
- 32 G. Telescopii, CD−52°8861, CPD−52°11273, GC 25871, HD 174430, HIP 92687, HR 7093, SAO 245783

Database references
SIMBAD	data

HD 174430, also designated as HR 7093 or rarely 32 G. Telescopii, is a solitary blue-hued star located in the southern constellation Telescopium near Kappa Telescopii. It has an apparent magnitude of 6.29, placing it near the limit for naked eye, even under ideal conditions. The object is located relatively far at a distance of 1,140 light-years based on Gaia DR3 parallax measurements, but it is drifting closer with a heliocentric radial velocity of −23 km/s. At its current distance, HD 174430's brightness is diminished by 0.32 magnitudes due to interstellar extinction and it has an absolute magnitude of −1.80.

HD 174430 has a stellar classification of B3/5 III, indicating that it is an evolved B-type star with the characteristics of a B3 and B5 giant star. It has also been given a less evolved class of B6 V. It has 4.05 times the mass of the Sun and 5.72 times the radius of the Sun. It radiates 696 times the luminosity of the Sun from its photosphere at an effective temperature of 14,824 K. HD 174430 has a near solar metallicity of [Fe/H] = −0.01 and it is estimated to be 76 million years old.
