= HD 192827 =

Suspected variable; Telescopium

- Location of HD 192827 and HD 192886 (circled)

Observation data Epoch J2000.0 Equinox ICRS
- Constellation: Telescopium
- Right ascension: 20^{h} 18^{m} 55.97916^{s}
- Declination: −47° 42′ 38.8042″
- Apparent magnitude (V): 6.28±0.01

Characteristics
- Evolutionary stage: AGB
- Spectral type: M1 III
- B−V color index: +1.47
- Variable type: suspected

Astrometry
Radial velocity (R_{v})	−43.7±0.9 km/s
Proper motion (μ)	RA: +14.547 mas/yr Dec.: −3.934 mas/yr
Parallax (π)	2.4785±0.0638 mas
Distance	1,320 ± 30 ly (400 ± 10 pc)
Absolute magnitude (M_{V})	−1.07

Details
Mass	1.21 M_{☉}
Radius	119±6 R_{☉}
Luminosity	1242±71 L_{☉}
Surface gravity (log g)	0.57 cgs
Temperature	3,786±122 K
Metallicity [Fe/H]	−0.24 dex

Other designations
- 83 G. Telescopii, NSV 25083, CD−48°13509, CPD−48°10371, FK5 1528, GC 28202, HD 192827, HIP 100151, HR 7745, SAO 230144

Database references
SIMBAD	data

HD 192827, also known as HR 7745 or rarely 83 G. Telescopii, is a solitary red hued star located in the southern constellation Telescopium. It has an apparent magnitude of 6.28, placing it near the limit for naked eye visibility. The object is located relatively far at a distance of 1,320 light years based on Gaia DR3 parallax measurements, but it is approaching with a heliocentric radial velocity of −43.7 km/s. At its current distance, HD 192827's brightness is diminished by 0.19 magnitudes due to interstellar dust and it has an absolute magnitude of −1.07.

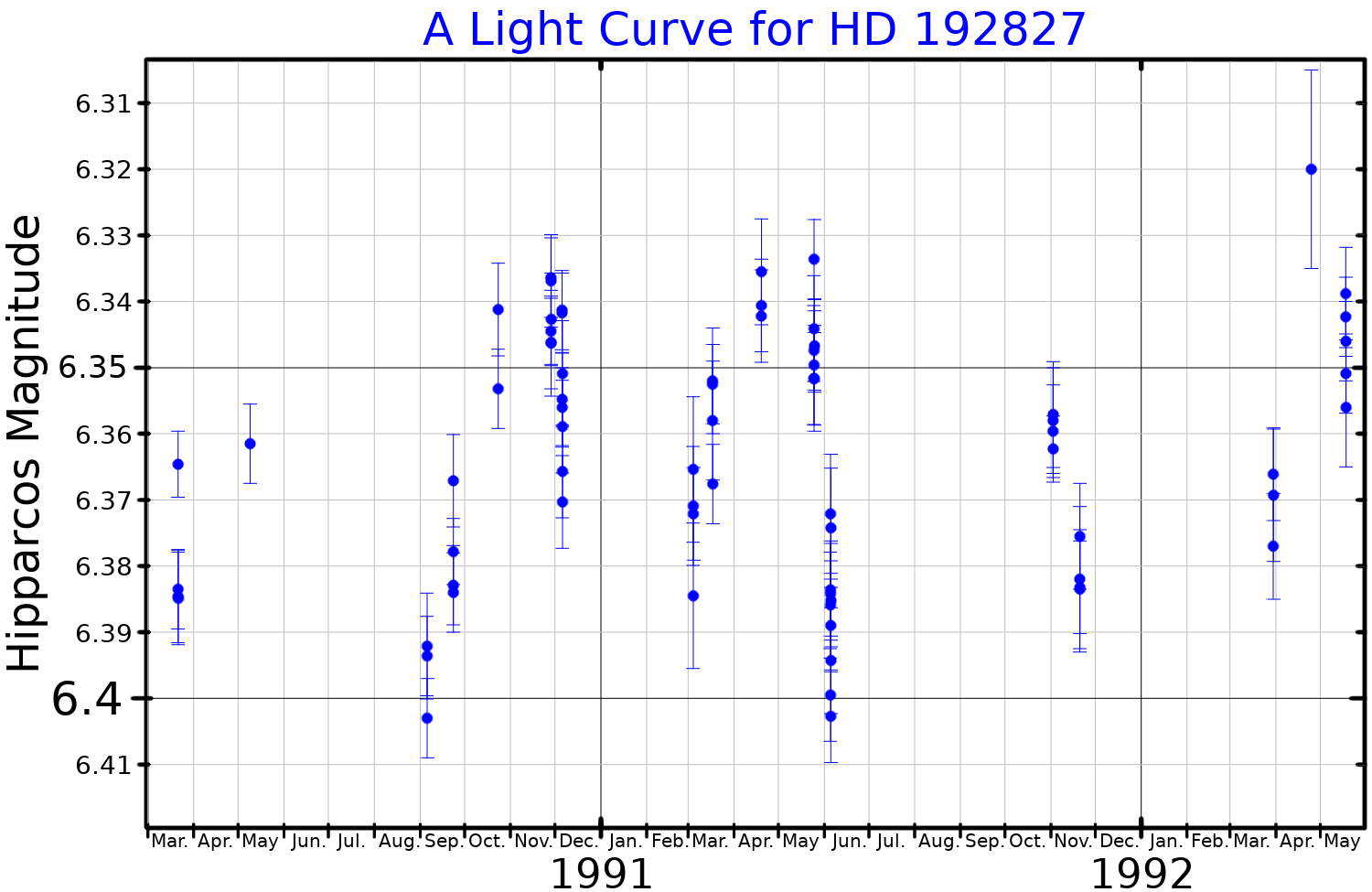
A light curve for HD 192827, plotted from Hipparcos data

HD 192827 has a stellar classification of M1 III, indicating that it is an evolved red giant. It is currently on the asymptotic giant branch, generating energy by fusing hydrogen and helium shells around an inert carbon core. Having exhausted hydrogen at its core, HD 192827 has expanded to 119 times the radius of the Sun and now radiates 1,242 times the luminosity of the Sun from its enlarged photosphere at an effective temperature of 3,786 K. It has a comparable mass to the Sun and has a metallicity of [Fe/H] = −0.24, making it metal deficient.

HD 192827 was first suspected to be variable in 1997 by the Hipparcos satellite. It fluctuates between magnitudes 6.34 and 6.40 in the Hipparcos passband. As of 2004 however, HD 192827 has not been confirmed to be variable.

== See also ==
- HD 192886, an F-type main-sequence star located 519.4" away
