= HD 174500 =

Star in the constellation of Telescopium

- Location of HD 174500 and HD 174387 (circled)

Observation data Epoch J2000.0 Equinox J2000.0
- Constellation: Telescopium
- Right ascension: 18^{h} 52^{m} 59.90009^{s}
- Declination: −46° 35′ 10.7923″
- Apparent magnitude (V): 6.16±0.01

Characteristics
- Evolutionary stage: subgiant
- Spectral type: A1 IV/V
- U−B color index: +0.05
- B−V color index: +0.04

Astrometry
Radial velocity (R_{v})	35.1±1.7 km/s
Proper motion (μ)	RA: +3.439 mas/yr Dec.: +10.006 mas/yr
Parallax (π)	4.7156±0.035 mas
Distance	692 ± 5 ly (212 ± 2 pc)
Absolute magnitude (M_{V})	−0.82

Details
Mass	3.00±0.09 M_{☉}
Radius	5.05±0.26 R_{☉}
Luminosity	273^{+57}_{−47} L_{☉}
Surface gravity (log g)	3.47^{+0.08}_{−0.05} cgs
Temperature	9,594^{+134}_{−132} K
Metallicity [Fe/H]	+0.02 dex
Rotational velocity (v sin i)	214 km/s
Age	370 Myr

Other designations
- 34 G. Telescopii, CD−46°12676, CPD−46°9517, GC 25873, HD 174500, HIP 92669, HR 7097, SAO 229343

Database references
SIMBAD	data

HD 174500, also designated as HR 7097 or rarely 34 G. Telescopii, is a solitary white-hued star located in the southern constellation Telescopium. It has an apparent magnitude of 6.16, placing it near the limit for naked eye visibility. Gaia DR3 parallax measurements place the object 692 light years away, and it is currently receding with a heliocentric radial velocity of 35 km/s. At its current distance, HD 174500's brightness is diminished by 0.39 magnitudes due to interstellar dust. It has an absolute magnitude of −0.82.

HD 174500 has a stellar classification of A1 IV/V, indicating that it is an evolved A-type star with the blended luminosity class of a subgiant and a main sequence star. It has 3 times the mass of the Sun and an enlarged radius of 5.05 R_{☉}. It radiates 273 times the luminosity of the Sun from its photosphere at an effective temperature of 9,594 K. At the age of 370 million years HD 174500 is currently on the subgiant track and is 1.8% past its main sequence lifetime. Like many hot stars it spins rapidly, having a projected rotational velocity of 214 km/s. It has a solar metallicity with [Fe/H] = +0.02.

This object is located close to the 5th magnitude star HD 174387. However, they do not form a double star.
