= HIP 70849 b =

Extrasolar planet in the constellation Lupus

Discovery
- Discovered by: Segransan et al.
- Discovery site: La Silla Observatory
- Discovery date: October 19, 2009
- Detection method: radial velocity (HARPS)

Orbital characteristics
- Semi-major axis: 3.99+0.06 −0.07 AU
- Eccentricity: 0.65+0.02 −0.01
- Orbital period (sidereal): 3,649 ± 18 days (9.990 ± 0.049 a)
- Inclination: 96°±16°
- Longitude of ascending node: 35°±6°
- Argument of periastron: 182°±1°
- Star: HIP 70849

Physical characteristics
- Mass: 4.5+0.4 −0.3 M_{J}

HIP 70849 b is an extrasolar planet which orbits the K-type main sequence star HIP 70849, located approximately 79 light years away in the constellation Lupus. This planet was detected by HARPS and announced on October 19, 2009, together with 31 other planets. Its parameters were initially poorly constrained, estimated to have a minimum mass of 3-15 M_{J} and take anywhere from 5-90 years to orbit the star at a semimajor axis of 4.5-36 AU, with the eccentricity and inclination being unknown. This was significantly updated in a December 2022 paper, which found much better constrained parameters including a high eccentricity, and in a January 2023 paper which determined the planet's inclination and true mass via astrometry.
