= HD 127334 =

Star in the constellation Boötes

- Location of HD 127334 (circled)

Observation data Epoch J2000.0 Equinox ICRS
- Constellation: Boötes
- Right ascension: 14^{h} 29^{m} 36.80877^{s}
- Declination: +41° 47′ 45.2854″
- Apparent magnitude (V): 6.36

Characteristics
- Spectral type: G5V CH0.3
- B−V color index: 1.010
- J−H color index: 0.258
- J−K color index: 0.369

Astrometry
Radial velocity (R_{v})	−0.401±0.0007 km/s
Proper motion (μ)	RA: 161.373 mas/yr Dec.: −220.361 mas/yr
Parallax (π)	42.7526±0.0174 mas
Distance	76.29 ± 0.03 ly (23.390 ± 0.010 pc)
Absolute magnitude (M_{V})	+4.48

Details
Mass	1.02±0.02, 1.07 M_{☉}
Radius	1.2 R_{☉}
Luminosity	1.4 L_{☉}
Surface gravity (log g)	4.37±0.13 cgs
Temperature	5758±76, 5635±50 K
Metallicity [Fe/H]	0.24±0.06, 0.19±0.04 dex
Rotational velocity (v sin i)	7.1 km/s
Age	8.6±1.3, 10.5–10.7, ~7.1 Gyr

Other designations
- AG+42°1283, BD+42°2508, GC 19550, GJ 3852, HD 127334, HIP 70873, HR 5423, SAO 45075, PPM 54166, TIC 27525457, TYC 3039-237-1, 2MASS J14293678+4147456, Gaia DR2 1491593733326694912

Database references
SIMBAD	data

HD 127334 is a solitary Sun-like star in the northern constellation of Boötes. With an apparent magnitude of 6.36, it can be faintly seen by the naked eye from Earth as a yellow-hued dot of light. As such, it is listed in the Bright Star Catalogue as HR 5423. It is located at a distance of 76.29 light-years (23.39 parsecs) according to Gaia EDR3 parallax measurements.

== Stellar properties ==
This is a G-type main-sequence star much like the Sun, with a spectral type of G5V CH0.3, where the suffix notation indicates an anomalous overabundance of the methylidyne radical. It is slightly more massive than the Sun but marginally cooler at 5,758 K (5,485 °C; 9,905 °F) or 5,635 K (5,362 °C; 9,683 °F). The Sun's effective temperature, for comparison, is 5,772 K (5,499 °C; 9,930 °F).

The star belongs to the thin disk population of the Milky Way and is thought to be ancient: its age estimate varies between publications, but generally lies between 7–11 Gyr, much older than the Solar System (aged 4.568 Gyr). Despite its old age, it is enriched in heavy elements, possessing a super-solar metallicity of 0.24±0.06 or 0.19±0.04 dex.

It has a low or very low level of surface activity, unlike some other similar stars such as Toliman (Alpha Centauri B).

HD 127334 has been a long-term target of the California Planet Search, but no exoplanets have been discovered to orbit the star.

== See also ==
- Solar analog
- List of star systems within 75–80 light-years
