= HD 191829 =

High proper motion red giant star in the constellation of Telescopium

Observation data Epoch J2000.0 Equinox ICRS
- Constellation: Telescopium
- Right ascension: 20^{h} 14^{m} 19.0252^{s}
- Declination: −52° 26′ 44.755″
- Apparent magnitude (V): 5.632±0.009

Characteristics
- Spectral type: K4 III
- B−V color index: +1.5

Astrometry
Radial velocity (R_{v})	14±3 km/s
Proper motion (μ)	RA: +25.493 mas/yr Dec.: −54.246 mas/yr
Parallax (π)	4.5849±0.1152 mas
Distance	710 ± 20 ly (218 ± 5 pc)
Absolute magnitude (M_{V})	−0.95

Details
Mass	1.17 M_{☉}
Radius	46.44 R_{☉}
Luminosity	561 L_{☉}
Surface gravity (log g)	1.13 cgs
Temperature	3,800 K
Metallicity [Fe/H]	+0.13 dex
Rotational velocity (v sin i)	2.2±1.2 km/s

Other designations
- 81 G. Telescopii, CPD−52°11643, GC 28063, HD 191829, HIP 99747, HR 7714, SAO 246495

Database references
SIMBAD	data

HD 191829 (HR 7714) is a solitary star located in the southern constellation Telescopium. It has an apparent magnitude of 5.632, making it faintly visible to the naked eye if viewed under ideal conditions. The star is situated at a distance of 710 light years but is receding with a heliocentric radial velocity of 14 km/s.

HD 191829 has a stellar classification of K4 III, indicating that the object is an ageing K-type giant. It has an angular diameter of 1.98±0.16, yielding a diameter 47 times that of the Sun at its estimated distance. At present it has 117% the mass of the Sun and shines at 561 L_{☉} from its enlarged photosphere at an effective temperature of 3,800 K, giving it an orange glow. HD 191829 has a metallicity 135% that of the Sun and spins modestly with a projected rotational velocity of 2.4 km/s.
