= HD 173047 =

B-type bright giant in the constellation Telescopium

Observation data Epoch J2000.0 Equinox J2000.0 (ICRS)
- Constellation: Telescopium
- Right ascension: 18^{h} 45^{m} 55.99514^{s}
- Declination: −50° 52′ 21.7342″
- Apparent magnitude (V): 6.24±0.01

Characteristics
- Spectral type: B8/9 II
- B−V color index: −0.080±0.006

Astrometry
Radial velocity (R_{v})	−10.7±0.4 km/s
Proper motion (μ)	RA: +3.697 mas/yr Dec.: −15.975 mas/yr
Parallax (π)	3.1031±0.0499 mas
Distance	1,050 ± 20 ly (322 ± 5 pc)
Absolute magnitude (M_{V})	−1.52

Details
Mass	4.00±0.11 M_{☉}
Radius	5.54^{+0.15}_{−0.14} R_{☉}
Luminosity (bolometric)	692 L_{☉}
Surface gravity (log g)	3.43 cgs
Temperature	11,843±156 K
Metallicity [Fe/H]	+0.10 dex
Age	194 Myr

Other designations
- 28 G. Telescopii, CD−50°12122, CPD−50°10815, GC 25645, HD 173047, HIP 92072, SAO 245693

Database references
SIMBAD	data

HD 173047 is a solitary, bluish-white hued star located in the southern constellation Telescopium. It has an apparent magnitude of 6.24, placing it near the limit for naked eye visibility, even under ideal conditions. The object is located relatively far at a distance of 1,050 light-years based on Gaia DR3 parallax measurements, but it is drifting closer with a heliocentric radial velocity of −10.7 km/s. At its current distance, HHD 173047's brightness is heavily diminished by 0.44 magnitudes due to interstellar extinction and it has an absolute magnitude of −1.52

HD 173047 has a stellar classification of B8/9 II, indicating that it is an evolved B-type star with the characteristics of a B8 and B9 bright giant. It has 4 times the mass of the Sun and a slightly enlarged radius that is 5.54 times that of the Sun. It radiates a bolometric luminosity 692 times that of the Sun from its photosphere at an effective temperature of 11,843 K. HD 173047 is metal enriched with an iron abundance of 126% that of the Sun ([Fe/H] = +0.10) and it is estimated to be 194 million years old.
