= HD 181295 =

Astrometric binary in the constellation Telescopium

Observation data Epoch J2000.0 Equinox ICRS
- Constellation: Telescopium
- Right ascension: 19^{h} 22^{m} 37.74947^{s}
- Declination: −51° 13′ 52.6099″
- Apparent magnitude (V): 6.42±0.01

Characteristics
- Evolutionary stage: main sequence star
- Spectral type: F0 V
- B−V color index: 0.328±0.007

Astrometry
Radial velocity (R_{v})	−35.7±0.5 km/s
Proper motion (μ)	RA: 73.087 mas/yr Dec.: −8.778 mas/yr
Parallax (π)	12.9643±0.4818 mas
Distance	252 ± 9 ly (77 ± 3 pc)
Absolute magnitude (M_{V})	+2.14

Details
Mass	1.74 M_{☉}
Radius	2.35±0.15 R_{☉}
Luminosity	13.3^{+0.9}_{−0.8} L_{☉}
Surface gravity (log g)	3.84 cgs
Temperature	6,850±69 K
Metallicity [Fe/H]	−0.27 dex
Rotation	2.7 d
Rotational velocity (v sin i)	56.9±1.9 km/s
Age	1.41 Gyr

Other designations
- 56 G. Telescopii, CD−51°12054, CPD−51°11215, GC 22691, HD 181295, HIP 95239, SAO 246053, TIC 424748146

Database references
SIMBAD	data

HD 181295 is a star located in the southern constellation Telescopium. It has an apparent magnitude of 6.42, placing it near the limit of naked eye visibility, even under ideal conditions. The object is located relatively close at a distance of approximately 252 light-years based on Gaia DR3 parallax measurements, and it is currently drifting closer with a heliocentric radial velocity of −35.7 km/s. At its current distance, HD 181295's brightness is diminished by 0.22 magnitudes due to interstellar extinction and it has an absolute magnitude +2.14.

Proper motion variations from this star was first detected in a 2005 Hipparcos proper motion survey. These variations indicated the presence of an unseen companion tugging on the star. As of the follow up survey published in 2006, it is considered a probable astrometric binary with a 97% chance.

The visible component has a stellar classification of F0 V, indicating that it is an ordinary F-type main-sequence star that is generating energy via hydrogen fusion at its core. It has 1.74 times the mass of the Sun and 2.35 times the radius of the Sun. It radiates 13.3 times the luminosity of the Sun from its photosphere at an effective temperature of 6,850 K, giving it the typical yellowish-white of a F-type star. At the age of 1.41 billion years, HD 181295A is a rather evolved star for its class, having completed 77.3% of its main sequence lifetime. The star has an iron abundance of [Fe/H] = −0.27 and it spins modestly with a projected rotational velocity of 56.9 km/s within 2.7 days.
