= HD 168871 =

G-type main sequence star; Telescopium

Observation data Epoch J2000.0 Equinox J2000.0 (ICRS)
- Constellation: Telescopium
- Right ascension: 18^{h} 24^{m} 33.13773^{s}
- Declination: −49° 39′ 10.3588″
- Apparent magnitude (V): 6.45±0.01

Characteristics
- Evolutionary stage: main sequence
- Spectral type: G1/2 V or G0- V
- U−B color index: +0.05
- B−V color index: +0.58

Astrometry
Radial velocity (R_{v})	+35.10±0.69 km/s
Proper motion (μ)	RA: +32.659 mas/yr Dec.: −149.822 mas/yr
Parallax (π)	36.5735±0.0221 mas
Distance	89.18 ± 0.05 ly (27.34 ± 0.02 pc)
Absolute magnitude (M_{V})	+4.19

Details
Mass	1.03±0.03 M_{☉}
Radius	1.25±0.03 R_{☉}
Luminosity	1.659^{+0.005}_{−0.006} L_{☉}
Surface gravity (log g)	4.23±0.04 cgs
Temperature	5994±29 K
Metallicity [Fe/H]	−0.09±0.01 dex
Rotational velocity (v sin i)	3.1 km/s
Age	6.05±1.40 Gyr

Other designations
- 9 G. Telescopii, CD−49 12105, CPD−49 10555, GC 29505, HD 168871, HIP 90223, SAO 228983, TIC 160991902

Database references
SIMBAD	data

HD 168871 (HIP 90223; 9 G. Telescopii) is a star located in the southern constellation Telescopium. It has an apparent magnitude of 6.45, placing it near the limit for naked eye visibility. The object is located relatively close at a distance of 89.2 light-years based on Gaia DR3 parallax measurements, but it is drifting away with a heliocentric radial velocity of 35.1 km/s. At its current distance, HD 168871’s brightness is diminished by an interstellar extinction of 0.14 magnitudes and it has a visual absolute magnitude of +4.19. It has a relatively high proper motion across the celestial sphere, moving at a rate of 153.34 mas/yr.

HD 168871 has a stellar classification of G1/2 V, indicating that it is a G-type main-sequence star with the characteristics of a G1 and G2 main sequence star. Gray et al. (2006) gives a classification of G0- V, indicating that it is a slightly hotter main sequence star. It has 1.03 times the mass of the Sun and 1.25 times the radius of the Sun. It radiates 1.66 times the luminosity of the Sun from its photosphere at an effective temperature of 5,994 K, giving it a whitish-yellow hue when viewed in the night sky. HD 168871 is slightly metal deficient with an iron abundance 81.3%of the Sun's. It is older than the Sun at the age of 6.05 billion years and it spins slowly with a projected rotational velocity of 3.1 km/s, which is slightly faster than the Sun's rotational velocity of 2 km/s.
