= HD 186756 =

K-type giant; Telescopium

- Location of HD 186756 (circled)

Observation data Epoch J2000.0 Equinox ICRS
- Constellation: Telescopium
- Right ascension: 19^{h} 48^{m} 55.08814^{s}
- Declination: −52° 53′ 17.1953″
- Apparent magnitude (V): 6.25

Characteristics
- Spectral type: K1 III
- U−B color index: +1.12
- B−V color index: +1.13

Astrometry
Radial velocity (R_{v})	−21.2±0.4 km/s
Proper motion (μ)	RA: +14.802 mas/yr Dec.: −48.522 mas/yr
Parallax (π)	4.3872±0.0275 mas
Distance	743 ± 5 ly (228 ± 1 pc)
Absolute magnitude (M_{V})	−0.96

Details
Mass	1.23 M_{☉}
Radius	21.01±1.07 R_{☉}
Luminosity	177±2 L_{☉}
Surface gravity (log g)	1.83 cgs
Temperature	4,747±122 K
Metallicity [Fe/H]	−0.13 dex
Rotational velocity (v sin i)	<1 km/s

Other designations
- 68 G. Telescopii, CD−53°8294, CPD−53°9678, FK5 3581, GC 27384, HD 186756, HIP 97491, HR 7521, SAO 246277

Database references
SIMBAD	data

HD 186756, also known as HR 7521 or rarely 68 G. Telescopii, is a solitary orange hued star located in the southern constellation Telescopium. It has an apparent magnitude of 6.25, placing it near the limit for naked eye visibility, even under ideal conditions. Gaia DR3 parallax measurements imply a distance of 743 light years; it is currently approaching with a heliocentric radial velocity of −21.2 km/s. At its current distance, HD 186756's brightness is diminished by 0.34 magnitudes due to extinction from interstellar dust and it has an absolute magnitude of −0.96.

This is an evolved red giant star with a stellar classification of K1 III. It has 123% the mass of the Sun but it has expanded to 21.01 times the radius of the Sun. The object radiates 177 times the luminosity of the Sun from its enlarged photosphere at an effective temperature of 4,747 K. HD 186756 is slightly metal deficient with an iron abundance of [Fe/H] = −0.13 (74% solar) and it spins too slowly for its projected rotational velocity to be measured accurately.
