= HIP 70849 =

Star in the constellation Lupus

Observation data Epoch J2000.0 Equinox J2000.0
- Constellation: Lupus
- Right ascension: 14^{h} 29^{m} 18.56436^{s}
- Declination: −46° 27′ 49.7378″
- Apparent magnitude (V): 10.36

Characteristics
- Evolutionary stage: main sequence
- Spectral type: K7Vk
- Apparent magnitude (B): 11.787
- Apparent magnitude (J): 7.639±0.023
- Apparent magnitude (H): 7.006±0.061
- Apparent magnitude (K): 6.790±0.027
- B−V color index: 1.427±0.019
- Variable type: 8.50

Astrometry
Radial velocity (R_{v})	−0.134±0.001 km/s
Proper motion (μ)	RA: −44.051±0.017 mas/yr Dec.: −201.577±0.020 mas/yr
Parallax (π)	41.4618±0.0175 mas
Distance	78.66 ± 0.03 ly (24.12 ± 0.01 pc)
Absolute magnitude (M_{V})	8.5

Details
Mass	0.647±0.013 M_{☉}
Radius	0.62±0.02 R_{☉}
Luminosity (bolometric)	0.0892±0.0005 L_{☉}
Surface gravity (log g)	3.70±0.09 cgs
Temperature	4,103±25 K
Metallicity [Fe/H]	0.00±0.03 dex
Rotation	41.2 d
Rotational velocity (v sin i)	1.93 km/s 0.30±0.30 km/s
Age	3.6±0.15 Gyr

Other designations
- NSV 6678, CD−45°9206, GJ 550.3, HIP 70849, PPM 760399, LTT 5717, NLTT 37446

Database references
SIMBAD	data
Exoplanet Archive	data

HIP 70849 is a star with two non-stellar companions in the southern constellation Lupus. It is a 10th magnitude star, making it too faint to be visible to the naked eye. The system is located at a distance of 78.7 light-years from the Sun based on parallax measurements.

This is a K-type main-sequence star with a stellar classification of K7Vk, where the 'k' indicates interstellar absorption features in the spectrum. The star is magnetically active with a 10.1±1.4 yr starspot cycle. It appears about 3.6 billion years old and the light emission shows a 41.2 day periodicity, which is likely the rotation period. This star, which resembles a brighter red dwarf, is smaller and less massive than the Sun. It is radiating just 9% of the luminosity of the Sun from its photosphere at an effective temperature of 4,103 K.

The companion is a T4.5 brown dwarf companion orbiting it at a separation around ~9,000 AU.

== Planetary system ==
In 2009, a gas giant planet was found in orbit around it. Designated HIP 70849 b, it has 4.55 times the mass of Jupiter and takes 10.05 years to orbit at a semimajor axis of 4.04 AU, with a high eccentricity.

The HIP 70849 planetary system
Companion (in order from star)	Mass	Semimajor axis (AU)	Orbital period (years)	Eccentricity	Inclination (°)	Radius
b	4.55±0.51 M_{J}	4.037±0.030	10.046+0.054 −0.046	0.584+0.070 −0.079	130+14 −26	—
