= Rho Telescopii =

Star in the constellation Telescopium

Observation data Epoch J2000.0 Equinox J2000.0 (ICRS)
- Constellation: Telescopium
- Right ascension: 19^{h} 06^{m} 19.95580^{s}
- Declination: −52° 20′ 27.2757″
- Apparent magnitude (V): +5.17

Characteristics
- Spectral type: F6 V
- B−V color index: +0.53

Astrometry
Radial velocity (R_{v})	+0.1±0.7 km/s
Proper motion (μ)	RA: +32.47 mas/yr Dec.: −115.24 mas/yr
Parallax (π)	17.63±0.59 mas
Distance	185 ± 6 ly (57 ± 2 pc)
Absolute magnitude (M_{V})	1.69

Details
Mass	1.97 M_{☉}
Luminosity	25.6 L_{☉}
Surface gravity (log g)	3.51 cgs
Temperature	6,303±80 K
Metallicity [Fe/H]	+0.01 dex
Rotational velocity (v sin i)	68.5±4.0 km/s
Age	1.30 Gyr

Other designations
- ρ Tel, CPD−52°11356, HD 177171, HIP 93815, HR 7213, SAO 245921

Database references
SIMBAD	data

Rho Telescopii (ρ Tel, ρ Telescopii) is an astrometric binary star system in the southern constellation of Telescopium. It is visible to the naked eye, with an apparent visual magnitude of +5.17. Based upon an annual parallax shift of 17.63 mas as measured from Earth, it is located approximately 185 light years from the Sun.

This appears to be a single-lined spectroscopic binary as it displays radial velocity variation with a period of 1.7 days. The visible component is an F-type main sequence star with a stellar classification of F6 V. It has about double the mass of the Sun and is radiating 25.6 times the solar luminosity from its photosphere at an effective temperature of 6,303 K. The star is a bright X-ray source with a luminosity of 65.76×10^{29} ergs s^{−1}.

Relative to neighboring stars, Rho Telescopii has a peculiar velocity of 17.2 km s^{−1}. It may be a member of the Tucana-Horologium association.

Various age estimates
Age	Source
1.5±0.2 Myr	Tetzlaff et al. (2011)
30 Myr	Lagrange et al. (2013)
0.20 Gyr	Ballering et al. (2013)
1.30 Gyr	Casagrande et al. (2011)
