= HD 183552 =

Star in the constellation of Telescopium

Observation data Epoch J2000.0 Equinox ICRS
- Constellation: Telescopium
- Right ascension: 19^{h} 32^{m} 53.82390^{s}
- Declination: −53° 11′ 08.2148″
- Apparent magnitude (V): 5.74±0.01

Characteristics
- Evolutionary stage: main sequence
- Spectral type: kA6 hF2 mF2 (II)
- U−B color index: +0.19
- B−V color index: +0.30

Astrometry
Radial velocity (R_{v})	14.00±13.8 km/s
Proper motion (μ)	RA: +36.270 mas/yr Dec.: −7.392 mas/yr
Parallax (π)	9.6769±0.1128 mas
Distance	337 ± 4 ly (103 ± 1 pc)
Absolute magnitude (M_{V})	+0.45

Details
Mass	1.68±0.29 M_{☉}
Radius	4.7 R_{☉}
Luminosity	45 L_{☉}
Surface gravity (log g)	3.26 cgs
Temperature	7,317±282 K
Age	733±8 Myr

Other designations
- 62 G. Telescopium, CPD−53°9585, GC 26959, HD 183552, HIP 96141, HR 7411, SAO 246151

Database references
SIMBAD	data

HD 183552, also known as HR 7411, is a probable spectroscopic binary located in the southern constellation Telescopium. The system has a combined apparent magnitude of 5.74, allowing it to be faintly visible to the naked eye. Based on parallax measurements from the Gaia spacecraft, it is estimated to be 337 light years distant. The value is horribly constrained, but it appears to receding with a radial velocity of 14 km/s.

This object is an Am star with a spectral classification of kA6hF2mF2 (II), an evolved F-type star having the calcium K-line of an A6 star plus the hydrogen and metallic lines of an F2 star. Its current mass is 1.68 M_{☉} and is estimated to be 733 million years old, having completed 83.1% of its main sequence lifetime. It has expanded to 4.7 times the radius of the Sun and now radiates 45 times the luminosity of the Sun from its photosphere at an effective temperature of 7,317 K.
