= HD 174474 =

High proper motion star; Telescopium

- Location of HD 174474 (circled)

Observation data Epoch J2000.0 Equinox ICRS
- Constellation: Telescopium
- Right ascension: 18^{h} 53^{m} 02.34680^{s}
- Declination: −48° 21′ 39.2965″
- Apparent magnitude (V): 6.17±0.01

Characteristics
- Spectral type: A2 V
- U−B color index: +0.08
- B−V color index: +0.14

Astrometry
Radial velocity (R_{v})	−44±4 km/s
Proper motion (μ)	RA: −17.178 mas/yr Dec.: −77.772 mas/yr
Parallax (π)	13.3771±0.0444 mas
Distance	243.8 ± 0.8 ly (74.8 ± 0.2 pc)
Absolute magnitude (M_{V})	+1.61

Details
Mass	2.05±0.04 M_{☉}
Radius	1.89±0.10 R_{☉}
Luminosity	18.14 L_{☉}
Surface gravity (log g)	4.21^{+0.09}_{−0.06} cgs
Temperature	8664±295 K
Metallicity [Fe/H]	−0.11 dex
Age	630 Myr

Other designations
- 35 G. Telescopii, CD−48°12769, CPD−48°9971, GC 25872, HD 174474, HIP 92676, HR 7095, SAO 229342

Database references
SIMBAD	data

HD 174474, also designated as HR 7095 or rarely 35 G. Telescopii, is a solitary white-hued star located in the southern constellation Telescopium. It has an apparent magnitude of 6.17, placing it near the limit for naked eye visibility. The object is located relatively close at a distance of 244 light years based on Gaia DR3 parallax measurements but is drifting closer with a heliocentric radial velocity of −44 km/s. At its current distance, HD 174474's brightness is diminished by 0.26 magnitudes due to interstellar dust. It has an absolute magnitude of +1.61.

This is an ordinary A-type main-sequence star with a stellar classification of A2 V. It has double the mass of the Sun and 1.89 times the Sun's radius. It radiates 18.1 times the luminosity of the Sun from its photosphere at an effective temperature of 8,664 K. HD 174474 is slightly metal deficient with an iron abundance 22% below solar levels ([Fe/H] = −0.11). It is estimated to be 630 million years old based on stellar evolution models from David & Hillenbrand (2015).
