= HD 171819 =

Star in the constellation Telescopium

- Location of HD 171819 (circled)

Observation data Epoch J2000.0 Equinox J2000.0 (ICRS)
- Constellation: Telescopium
- Right ascension: 18^{h} 39^{m} 14.29289^{s}
- Declination: −47° 54′ 35.1520″
- Apparent magnitude (V): 5.84±0.01

Characteristics
- Evolutionary stage: main sequence
- Spectral type: A7 IV/V or A3 V
- B−V color index: +0.23

Astrometry
Radial velocity (R_{v})	−9±4.3 km/s
Proper motion (μ)	RA: +25.426 mas/yr Dec.: +13.951 mas/yr
Parallax (π)	10.4348±0.1045 mas
Distance	313 ± 3 ly (95.8 ± 1.0 pc)
Absolute magnitude (M_{V})	+0.65

Details
Mass	1.73^{+0.37}_{−0.19} M_{☉}
Radius	3.37±0.17 R_{☉}
Luminosity	33.3±0.1 L_{☉}
Surface gravity (log g)	3.60±0.08 cgs
Temperature	7,512 K
Metallicity [Fe/H]	−0.02 dex
Age	855 Myr

Other designations
- 22 G. Telescopii, CD−48°12644, CPD−48°9900, FK5 3482, GC 25474, HD 171819, HIP 91461, HR 6986, SAO 229165

Database references
SIMBAD	data

HD 171819, also known as HR 6986 or rarely 22 G. Telescopii, is a solitary star located in the southern constellation Telescopium. It is faintly visible to the naked eye as a white-hued object with an apparent magnitude of 5.84. The object is located relatively close at a distance of 313 light years based on Gaia DR3 parallax measurements, but it is approaching the Solar System with a heliocentric radial velocity of −9 km/s. At its current distance, HD 171819's brightness is diminished by one-quarter of a magnitude due to interstellar dust and it has an absolute magnitude of +0.65.

HD 171819 has a stellar classification of A7 IV/V, indicating that the object is a late A-type star with the blended luminosity class of a main sequence star and subgiant. However, astronomer William Buscombe gave it a class of A3 V, instead making it an ordinary A-type main-sequence star. Evolutionary models give it an age of 855 million years and place it towards the end of its main-sequence life. At present it has 1.73 times the mass of the Sun and a slightly enlarged radius 3.37 times that of the Sun. It radiates 33.3 times the luminosity of the Sun from its photosphere at an effective temperature of 7,512 K. HD 171819 has a near solar metallicity at [Fe/H] = −0.02.
