= HD 167257 =

Star in the constellation Telescopium

Observation data Epoch J2000 Equinox ICRS
- Constellation: Telescopium
- Right ascension: 18^{h} 17^{m} 00.9195^{s}
- Declination: –51° 04′ 05.7597″
- Apparent magnitude (V): 6.05±0.01

Characteristics
- Evolutionary stage: main sequence
- Spectral type: B9V
- B−V color index: −0.06

Astrometry
Radial velocity (R_{v})	−5.1±4.3 km/s
Proper motion (μ)	RA: +1.260 mas/yr Dec.: −9.497 mas/yr
Parallax (π)	7.7579±0.0512 mas
Distance	420 ± 3 ly (128.9 ± 0.9 pc)
Absolute magnitude (M_{V})	+0.64

Details
Mass	2.63±0.06 M_{☉}
Radius	2.8±0.1 R_{☉}
Luminosity	64.6+7.7 −8.7 L_{☉}
Surface gravity (log g)	3.97±0.06 cgs
Temperature	10,139 K
Metallicity [Fe/H]	0.00 dex
Rotational velocity (v sin i)	61 km/s
Age	239 Myr

Other designations
- 7 G. Telescopii, CD–51°11460, CPD−51°10795, GC 24909, HD 167257, HIP 89597, HR 6821, SAO 245372

Database references
SIMBAD	data

HD 167257 (HR 6821) is a solitary star in the southern constellation Telescopium. It has an apparent magnitude of 6.05, making it faintly visible to the naked eye. Parallax measurements place the star at a distance of 420 light years and has a radial velocity of −5.1 km/s, which is poorly constrained. This indicates that it is drifting towards the Solar System.

HD 167257 has a stellar classification of B9 V, indicating that it is an ordinary B-type main-sequence star. It has 2.63 times the mass of the Sun, and 2.8 times the radius of the Sun. It shines with a luminosity of about 65 L_{☉} from its photosphere at an effective temperature of 10,139 K, giving it a bluish white hue. HD 167257 is estimated to be about 240 million years old – 58.6% through its main sequence lifetime – and spins modestly with a projected rotational velocity of 61 km/s; it has a solar metallicity.
