= HD 166006 =

Double star in the constellation Telescopium

Observation data Epoch J2000 Equinox J2000
- Constellation: Telescopium
- Right ascension: 18^{h} 11^{m} 04.40^{s}
- Declination: −47° 30′ 47.2″
- Apparent magnitude (V): 6.07±0.01

Characteristics
- Spectral type: K1 III CN2
- B−V color index: +1.20

Astrometry
Radial velocity (R_{v})	−14.9±2.9 km/s
Proper motion (μ)	RA: −3.69±0.39 mas/yr Dec.: −29.50±0.23 mas/yr
Parallax (π)	5.6048±0.0652 mas
Distance	582 ± 7 ly (178 ± 2 pc)
Absolute magnitude (M_{V})	−0.12

Details
Mass	1.24 M_{☉}
Radius	20.1 R_{☉}
Luminosity	165 L_{☉}
Surface gravity (log g)	1.89 cgs
Temperature	4,529±93 K
Metallicity [Fe/H]	−0.07 dex
Rotational velocity (v sin i)	<1 km/s

Other designations
- CD−47 12098, HD 166006, HIP 89096, HR 6778, WDS J18111-4731A

Database references
SIMBAD	data

HD 166006, also known as HR 6778, is a solitary orange-hued star located in the southern constellation Telescopium. It has an apparent magnitude of 6.07, making it barely visible to the naked eye. Based on Gaia DR2 parallax measurements, the object is located 582 light years away. It is currently approaching the Solar System with a somewhat constrained heliocentric radial velocity of −15 km/s.

HD 166006 has a stellar classification of K1 III CN2, which indicates that it is an evolved red giant with a strong overabundance of cyano radicals in its spectrum, making it a CN star. At the estimated distance of HD 166006, the star has an angular diameter of 1.05 mas. This yields a radius of 20.1 R_{☉}. It has 1.24 times the mass of the Sun and radiates 165 times the luminosity of the Sun from its enlarged photosphere at an effective temperature of 4,529 K. The star is slightly metal deficient ([Fe/H] = −0.07) and spins a little too slowly to be accurately measured.HD 166006 has an optical 11th magnitude companion located 1.8" away along a position angle of 271° as of 2015.
