= 64 Piscium =

Star in the constellation Pisces

Observation data Epoch J2000 Equinox ICRS
- Constellation: Pisces
- Right ascension: 00^{h} 48^{m} 58.70805^{s}
- Declination: +16° 56′ 26.3132″
- Apparent magnitude (V): 5.07

Characteristics
- Spectral type: F8 V + F8 V
- B−V color index: 0.502

Astrometry
Radial velocity (R_{v})	+3.76±0.08 km/s
Proper motion (μ)	RA: −2.87 mas/yr Dec.: −202.05 mas/yr
Parallax (π)	42.64±0.27 mas
Distance	76.5 ± 0.5 ly (23.5 ± 0.1 pc)
Absolute magnitude (M_{V})	3.22

Orbit
Period (P)	13.8244906±0.000043 d
Semi-major axis (a)	6.545±0.0133 mas (0.073953±0.000048 AU)
Eccentricity (e)	0.23657±0.00063
Inclination (i)	73.92±0.80°
Longitude of the node (Ω)	207.41±0.65°
Periastron epoch (T)	50905.984 ± 0.015 MJD
Argument of periastron (ω) (secondary)	203.057±0.073°
Semi-amplitude (K_{1}) (primary)	57.552±0.037 km/s
Semi-amplitude (K_{2}) (secondary)	59.557±0.038 km/s

Details

64 Psc Aa
Mass	1.223±0.021 M_{☉}
Radius	1.25±0.08 R_{☉}
Luminosity	2.12 L_{☉}
Temperature	6,250±150 K
Metallicity [Fe/H]	0.00 dex
Age	6.81 Gyr

64 Psc Ab
Mass	1.170±0.018 M_{☉}
Radius	1.18±0.10 R_{☉}
Luminosity	1.85 L_{☉}
Temperature	6,200±200 K

Other designations
- 64 Psc, BD+16° 76, FK5 1020, GJ 9031, HD 4676, HIP 3810, HR 225, SAO 92099, WDS J00490+1656A

Database references
SIMBAD	data

64 Piscium is the Flamsteed designation for a close binary star system in the zodiac constellation of Pisces. It can be viewed with the naked eye, with the components having a combined apparent visual magnitude of 5.07. An annual parallax shift of 42.64 mas provides a distance estimate of 46.5 light years. The system is moving further from the Sun with a radial velocity of +3.76 km/s.

This is a double-lined spectroscopic binary system consisting of two similar components designated Aa and Ab. The initial orbital elements were determined by Abt and Levy (1976), giving an orbital period of 13.8 days. In Boden et al. (1999), the full set of orbital elements were derived using measurements with the Palomar Testbed Interferometer. Nadal et al. (1979) suggested that some variation in the measurements may be caused by a third component in the system, but this was not supported by the results from Boden et al. (1999). In 2005, Maciej Konacki pioneered a new technique for accurately determining the radial velocity of a double-lined binary system, which allowed the elements to be further refined. This yielded an orbital period of 13.82449 days, an eccentricity of 0.2366, and an angular semimajor axis of 6.55 mas.

Both stars in this system have a spectrum matching a stellar classification of F8 V, indicating they are ordinary F-type main-sequence stars that are generating energy via hydrogen fusion at their cores. The orbital measurements of this system allows the masses of the two stars to be determined accurately: the primary component has 1.22 times the mass of the Sun while the secondary has 1.17 times the Sun's mass. Both stars are larger and brighter than the Sun, with higher temperature photospheres − having effective temperatures of around 6,200 K compared to 5,772 K for the Sun. The age of the system is estimated as 6.8 billion years and they have a similar element abundance as the Sun.

In 2010, the system was identified as a debris disk candidate based upon the detection of an infrared excess at a wavelength of 24 μm. This dust has a mean temperature of 300 K and is orbiting at a radius of 1.7 AU, compared to a projected linear separation of 0.23 AU for the components.

The Washington Double Star Catalog lists two additional visual components. Component B is a magnitude 12.6 star at an angular separation of 77 arcseconds from the primary system. Component C is magnitude 13.0 and is located 71 arcseconds away. It is unknown if either is gravitationally bound to 64 Piscium Aab, but if they are then the projected separations are about 1,800 AU with an orbital period of around 50,000 years.
