= HD 193307 =

Star in the constellation Telescopium

- Location of HD 193307 (circled)

Observation data Epoch J2000.0 Equinox ICRS
- Constellation: Telescopium
- A
- Right ascension: 20^{h} 21^{m} 41.03652^{s}
- Declination: −49° 59′ 57.9001″
- Apparent magnitude (V): 6.27
- B
- Right ascension: 20^{h} 21^{m} 39.11678^{s}
- Declination: −49° 59′ 47.2058″
- Apparent magnitude (V): 12.8

Characteristics

A
- Spectral type: F9 V
- U−B color index: –0.02
- B−V color index: +0.55

B
- Spectral type: M2.5

Astrometry

A
Radial velocity (R_{v})	16.9±0.65 km/s
Proper motion (μ)	RA: −357.855 mas/yr Dec.: −250.604 mas/yr
Parallax (π)	32.0547±0.0415 mas
Distance	101.7 ± 0.1 ly (31.20 ± 0.04 pc)
Absolute magnitude (M_{V})	+3.80

B
Radial velocity (R_{v})	18.33±0.39 km/s
Proper motion (μ)	RA: −350.120 mas/yr Dec.: −252.474 mas/yr
Parallax (π)	32.0177±0.0193 mas
Distance	101.87 ± 0.06 ly (31.23 ± 0.02 pc)

Details

A
Mass	1.15±0.16 M_{☉}
Radius	1.49±0.07 R_{☉}
Luminosity	2.605±0.006 L_{☉}
Surface gravity (log g)	4.11±0.03 cgs
Temperature	6,059+96 −59 K
Metallicity [Fe/H]	−0.34±0.06 dex
Rotational velocity (v sin i)	<5 km/s
Age	7.55^{+0.62}_{−0.85} Gyr

Other designations
- WDS J20217-5000AB
- A: 86 G. Telescopii, CD–50°12929, CPD−50°11341, FK5 3630, GC 28291, GJ 9691, HD 193307, HIP 100412, HR 7766, SAO 246546
- B: WT 703

Database references
SIMBAD	A
- B

HD 193307 (HR 7766; Gliese 9691) is the primary of a binary star located the southern constellation Telescopium. It has an apparent magnitude of 6.27, placing it near the limit for naked eye visibility, even under ideal conditions. The star is located relatively close at a distance of 102 light years based on Gaia DR3 parallax measurements, but it is receding with a heliocentric radial velocity of 16.9 km/s. At its current distance, HD 193307's brightness is diminished by 0.18 magnitudes due to extinction from interstellar dust and it has an absolute magnitude of +3.80. HD 193307 has a relatively high proper motion, moving at a rate of 437 mas/yr.

There have been disagreements in the stellar classification of the object. Two sources give a class of F9 V, indicating that it is an ordinary F-type main-sequence star. David Stanley Evans gave it a slightly more evolved class of G2 IV-V, meaning that it is a G-type star with a luminosity class intermediate between a subgiant and main sequence star. Nancy Houk's spectral classification catalog lists HD 193307 as G0 V.

The accepted class for HD 193307 is F9 V. The object's current luminosity is 1.49 magnitudes above the ZAMS, indicating that HD 193307 is somewhat evolved. has 1.15 times the Sun's mass and a slightly enlarged radius of 1.49 R_{☉}. It radiates 2.61 times the luminosity of the Sun from its photosphere at an effective temperature of 6,059 K, which gives it the typical whitish-yellow hue of a late F-type star. At the age of 7.55 billion years, HD 193307 has nearly twice the Sun's age. The star is metal-deficient with an iron abundance 46% that of the Sun ([Fe/H] = −0.34) and it spins slowly with a projected rotational velocity lower than 5 km/s.

WT 703 is a 12th magnitude star located 21.3" away along a position angle of 300°. It has a class of M2.5, indicating that it is a M-type star. WT 703 is located around the same distance as HD 193307 and it has a similar proper motion.
