= HD 177406 =

Star in the constellation of Telescopium

- Location of HD 177406 (circled)

Observation data Epoch J2000.0 Equinox ICRS
- Constellation: Telescopium
- Right ascension: 19^{h} 06^{m} 55.60698^{s}
- Declination: −48° 17′ 56.9195″
- Apparent magnitude (V): 5.95±0.01

Characteristics
- Evolutionary stage: main sequence star
- Spectral type: A0 V
- U−B color index: −0.02
- B−V color index: −0.01

Astrometry
Radial velocity (R_{v})	−6.2±1.6 km/s
Proper motion (μ)	RA: +13.500 mas/yr Dec.: −12.738 mas/yr
Parallax (π)	8.8414±0.0541 mas
Distance	369 ± 2 ly (113.1 ± 0.7 pc)
Absolute magnitude (M_{V})	+0.60

Details
Mass	2.64^{+0.43}_{−0.28} M_{☉}
Radius	2.55±0.13 R_{☉}
Luminosity	62.4^{+1.5}_{−1.4} L_{☉}
Surface gravity (log g)	4.00 cgs
Temperature	10,275^{+229}_{−194} K
Metallicity [Fe/H]	0.00 dex
Rotation	27.2 d
Rotational velocity (v sin i)	50 - 100 km/s
Age	286±9 Myr

Other designations
- 47 G. Telescopii, CD−48°12901, CPD−48°10045, FK5 3523, GC 26272, HD 177406, HIP 93862, HR 7223, SAO 229493

Database references
SIMBAD	data

HD 177406, also known as HR 7223 or rarely 47 G. Telescopii, is a solitary star located in the southern constellation Telescopium. It is faintly visible to the naked eye as a white-hued point of light with an apparent magnitude of 5.95. Gaia DR3 parallax measurements imply a distance of 369 light years and it is currently approaching the Solar System with a heliocentric radial velocity of −6.2 km/s. At its current distance, HD 177406's brightness is diminished by 0.23 magnitudes due to interstellar dust and it has an absolute magnitude of +0.60.

HD 177406 has a stellar classification of A0 V, indicating that it is an ordinary A-type main-sequence star that is generating energy via hydrogen fusion at its core. It has 2.64 times the mass of the Sun and a radius 2.55 times that of the Sun. It radiates 62.4 times the luminosity of the Sun from its photosphere at an effective temperature of 10,275 K. It has a solar metallicity at [Fe/H] = +0.00 and it is estimated to be 286 million years old, having completed 58.66% of its main sequence lifetime.
