= HD 193002 =

Suspected variable; Telescopium

- Location of HD 193002 (circled)

Observation data Epoch J2000.0 Equinox J2000.0 (ICRS)
- Constellation: Telescopium
- Right ascension: 20^{h} 20^{m} 32.31401^{s}
- Declination: −55° 03′ 03.1837″
- Apparent magnitude (V): 6.26±0.01

Characteristics
- Evolutionary stage: AGB
- Spectral type: M0/1 III
- U−B color index: +2.01
- B−V color index: +1.59
- Variable type: suspected

Astrometry
Radial velocity (R_{v})	−9.1±0.4 km/s
Proper motion (μ)	RA: +9.106 mas/yr Dec.: −33.290 mas/yr
Parallax (π)	3.1785±0.0411 mas
Distance	1,030 ± 10 ly (315 ± 4 pc)
Absolute magnitude (M_{V})	−0.93

Details
Mass	1.08 M_{☉}
Radius	84.5±4.3 R_{☉}
Luminosity	711 L_{☉}
Surface gravity (log g)	0.87 cgs
Temperature	3,972±122 K
Metallicity [Fe/H]	+0.07 dex

Other designations
- 85 G. Telescopii, NSV 25094, CPD−55°9365, FK5 3626, GC 28241, HD 193002, HIP 100300, HR 7758, SAO 246535

Database references
SIMBAD	data

HD 193002 (HR 7758; NSV 25094) is a solitary red hued star located in the southern constellation Telescopium. It has an apparent magnitude of 6.26, placing it near the limit for naked eye visibility, even under ideal conditions. The object is located relatively far at a distance of 1,030 light years based on Gaia DR3 parallax measurements, but it is approaching the Solar System with a heliocentric radial velocity of −9.1 km/s. At its current distance, HD 193002's brightness is diminished by 0.17 magnitudes due to interstellar dust and it has an absolute magnitude of −0.93.

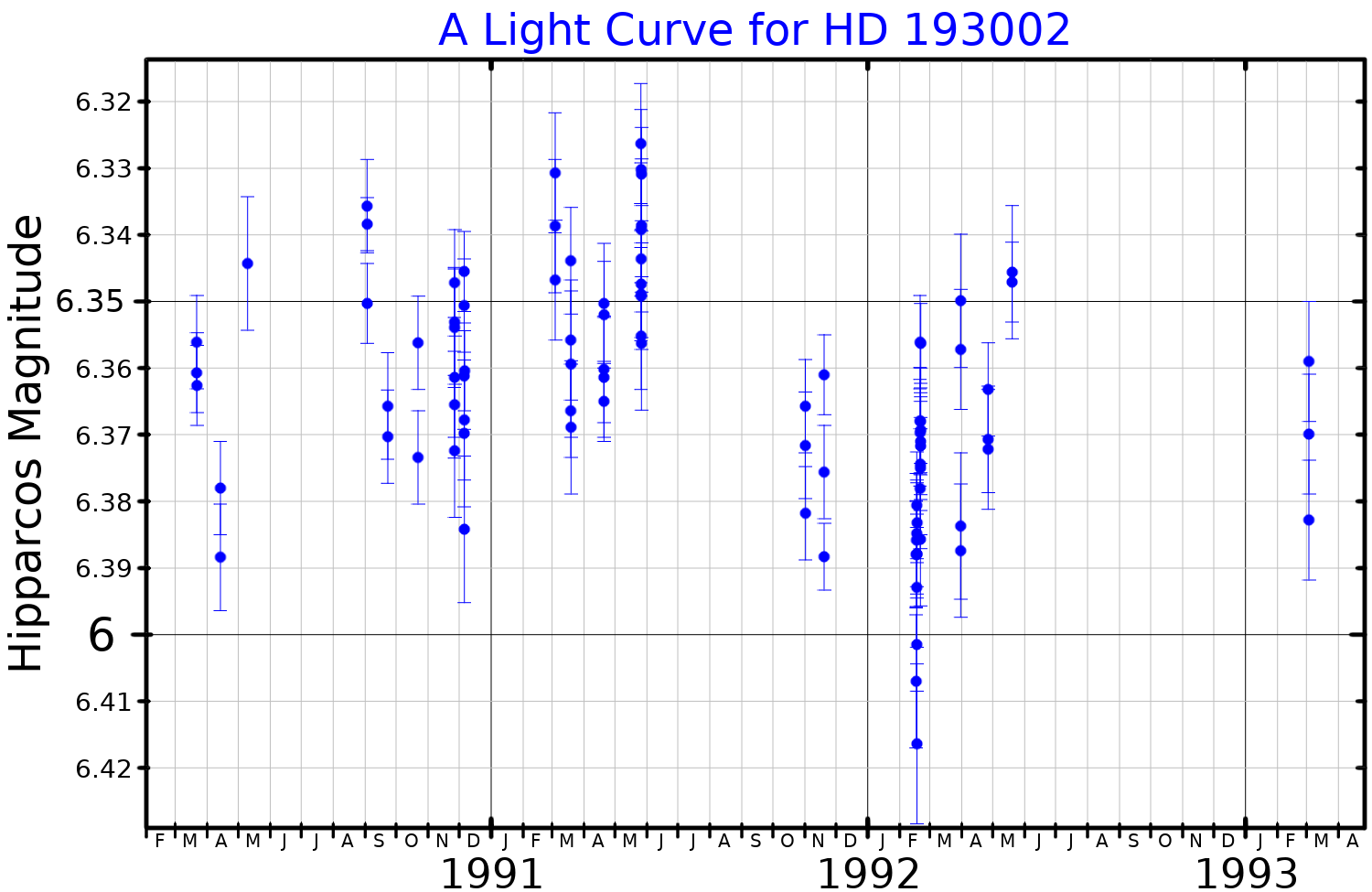
A light curve for HD 193002, plotted from Hipparcos data

HD 193002 has a stellar classification of M0/1 III, indicating that it is an evolved red giant with the characteristics of an M0 and M1 giant star. It is currently on the asymptotic giant branch, generating fusion via hydrogen and helium shells around an inert carbon core. It has a comparable mass to the Sun but it has expanded to 84.5 times the radius of the Sun. It radiates 711 times the luminosity of the Sun from its enlarged photosphere at an effective temperature of 3,972 K. HD 193002 is slightly metal enriched with an iron abundance 118% that of the Sun's or [Fe/H] = +0.07.

HD 193002 was first suspected to be variable in 1997 by the Hipparcos satellite. It fluctuates between 6.34 and 6.39 in the Hipparcos passband.
