= HD 177365 =

Binary star in the constellation Telescopium

Observation data Epoch J2000.0 Equinox ICRS
- Constellation: Telescopium
- Right ascension: 19^{h} 06^{m} 54.81838^{s}
- Declination: −50° 19′ 23.3136″
- Apparent magnitude (V): 6.27±0.01

Characteristics
- Spectral type: B9 V
- B−V color index: −0.10

Astrometry
Radial velocity (R_{v})	15.5±0.7 km/s
Proper motion (μ)	RA: −2.721 mas/yr Dec.: −31.275 mas/yr
Parallax (π)	8.7497±0.1414 mas
Distance	373 ± 6 ly (114 ± 2 pc)
Absolute magnitude (M_{V})	+0.16

Details
Mass	3.05^{+0.45}_{−0.33} M_{☉}
Radius	3.33^{+0.12}_{−0.15} R_{☉}
Luminosity	119 L_{☉}
Surface gravity (log g)	3.88^{+0.09}_{−0.05} cgs
Temperature	11,557^{+275}_{−352} K
Metallicity [Fe/H]	−0.11 dex
Age	226 Myr

Other designations
- 46 G. Telescopii, CD−50°12326, CPD−50°10955, GC 26265, HD 177365, HIP 93860, SAO 245925, WDS 19070-5019

Database references
SIMBAD	data

HD 177365 is a visual binary located in the southern constellation Telescopium. It has an apparent magnitude of 6.27, placing it near the limit for naked eye visibility, even under ideal conditions. Gaia DR3 parallax measurements imply a distance of 373 light-years and it is currently receding with a heliocentric radial velocity of 15.5 km/s. At its current distance, HD 177365's brightness is diminished by two-tenths of a magnitude due to interstellar extinction and it has an absolute magnitude of +0.16.

The binarity of the system was first noticed in a 1996 United States Naval Observatory survey. A Hipparcos proper motion survey published in 2006 catalogued the primary as a probable astrometric binary with an 89.6% chance. HD 177365 B, the companion, is a 16th magnitude star located 101.3" away along a position angle of 218° as of 2015.

The visible component has a stellar classification of B9 V, indicating that it is an ordinary B-type main-sequence star that is generating energy via hydrogen fusion. It has 3.05 times the mass of the Sun and 3.33 times the radius of the Sun. It radiates 119 times the luminosity of the Sun from its photosphere at an effective temperature of 11,557 K. HD 177365 A is slightly metal deficient with an iron abundance 78% that of the Sun's ([Fe/H] = −0.11) and it is estimated to be 226 million years old.
