= HO Telescopii =

Star in the constellation Telescopium

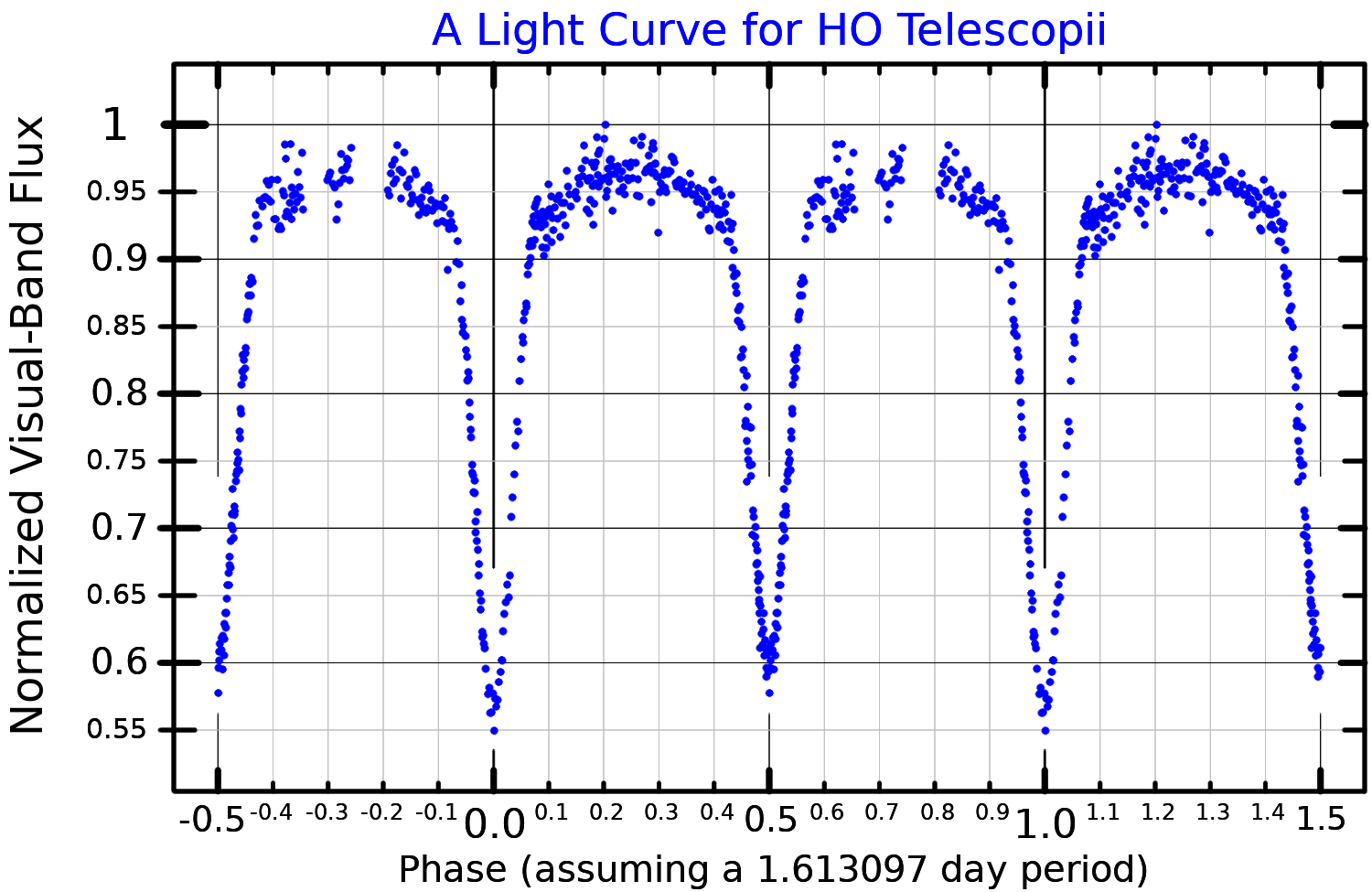
- A visual band light curve for HO Telescopii, adapted from Sürgit et al. (2017)

Observation data Epoch J2000.0 Equinox ICRS
- Constellation: Telescopium
- Right ascension: 19^{h} 51^{m} 58.93159^{s}
- Declination: −46° 51′ 42.4354″
- Apparent magnitude (V): 8.22 (Max)

Characteristics
- Spectral type: A7III(m)
- Variable type: Algol

Astrometry
Radial velocity (R_{v})	−5.91±0.09 km/s
Proper motion (μ)	RA: +1.814 mas/yr Dec.: −33.369 mas/yr
Parallax (π)	3.5831±0.0796 mas
Distance	910 ± 20 ly (279 ± 6 pc)

Orbit
Period (P)	1.613097 d
Semi-major axis (a)	≥0.019±0.0001 AU
Eccentricity (e)	0.00
Inclination (i)	82.7±0.5°
Periastron epoch (T)	2,451,875.06581±0.00027 HJD
Semi-amplitude (K_{1}) (primary)	131.11±0.18 km/s
Semi-amplitude (K_{2}) (secondary)	142.35±0.18 km/s

Details

A
Mass	1.88±0.04 M_{☉}
Radius	2.28±0.15 R_{☉}
Age	1.1 Gyr

B
Mass	1.73±0.04 M_{☉}
Radius	2.08±0.16 R_{☉}

Other designations
- HO Tel, CD−47°13121, HD 187418, HIP 97756, SAO 229902

Database references
SIMBAD	data

HO Telescopii is an eclipsing binary star system located in the southern constellation of Telescopium. The maximum apparent visual magnitude of 8.22 is too faint to be visible to the naked eye. The system is located at a distance of approximately 910 light years based on parallax. The combined stellar classification of the system is A7III(m), matching an evolved A-type star that is possibly metallic-lined. The system is around 1.1 billion years old and consists of two stars of similar mass and size.

The variability of this system was discovered by W. Strohmeier, R. Knigge, and H. Ott in 1965. It is a detached binary system with both components filling three-fourths of their respective Roche lobes. Their orbital period is 1.613097 days with a circularized orbit, and the orbital plane is inclined by 83° to the line of sight from the Earth; close to edge-on. As a consequence, they form an Algol-like eclipsing binary with a magnitude decrease of 0.51 during the primary eclipse and 0.45 during the secondary eclipse.
