= HD 185075 =

Star in the constellation Telescopium

- Location of HD 185075 (circled)

Observation data Epoch J2000.0 Equinox ICRS
- Constellation: Telescopium
- Right ascension: 19^{h} 40^{m} 18.71944^{s}
- Declination: −54° 25′ 04.0417″
- Apparent magnitude (V): 6.26

Characteristics
- Spectral type: K0 III
- B−V color index: +1.00

Astrometry
Radial velocity (R_{v})	14.8±0.4 km/s
Proper motion (μ)	RA: +76.081 mas/yr Dec.: −11.563 mas/yr
Parallax (π)	7.7297±0.0224 mas
Distance	422 ± 1 ly (129.4 ± 0.4 pc)
Absolute magnitude (M_{V})	+0.92

Details
Mass	1.34±0.06 M_{☉}
Radius	12.6±0.6 R_{☉}
Luminosity	79.8^{+0.2}_{−0.1} L_{☉}
Surface gravity (log g)	2.63±0.11 cgs
Temperature	4,785±25 K
Metallicity [Fe/H]	−0.42±0.02 dex
Rotational velocity (v sin i)	<1 km/s
Age	414 Myr

Other designations
- 65 G. Telescopii, CD−54°8939, CPD−54°9438, GC 27177, HD 185075, HIP 96781, HR 7459, SAO 246204

Database references
SIMBAD	data

HD 185075, also known as HR 7459 or rarely 65 G. Telescopii, is a solitary star located in the southern constellation Telescopium. It has an apparent magnitude of 6.26, placing it near the limit for naked eye visibility, even under ideal conditions. Gaia DR3 parallax measurements imply a distance of 422 light years and it is currently receding with a heliocentric radial velocity of 14.8 km/s. At its current distance, HD 185075's brightness is diminished by 0.23 magnitudes due to interstellar dust and it has an absolute magnitude of +0.92.

This is an evolved red giant with a stellar classification of K0 III. It has 1.34 times the mass of the Sun but it has expanded to 12.6 times the Sun's radius. It radiates 79.8 times the luminosity of the Sun from its enlarged photosphere at an effective temperature of 4,785 K, giving it an orange hue. HD 185075 is particularly metal deficient with an iron abundance 38% that of the Sun's ([Fe/H] = −0.42) and it spins too slowly for its projected rotational velocity to be measured accurately.
