= HD 170873 =

K-type giant; Telescopium

- Location of HD 170873 (circled)

Observation data Epoch J2000.0 Equinox ICRS
- Constellation: Telescopium
- Right ascension: 18^{h} 34^{m} 31.11856^{s}
- Declination: −52° 53′ 29.4756″
- Apparent magnitude (V): 6.20±0.01

Characteristics
- Evolutionary stage: red giant branch
- Spectral type: K2 III
- B−V color index: +1.27

Astrometry
Radial velocity (R_{v})	23.8±0.4 km/s
Proper motion (μ)	RA: −16.944 mas/yr Dec.: −42.325 mas/yr
Parallax (π)	5.9179±0.0283 mas
Distance	551 ± 3 ly (169.0 ± 0.8 pc)
Absolute magnitude (M_{V})	−0.31

Details
Mass	3.20±0.04 M_{☉}
Radius	22.6±1.2 R_{☉}
Luminosity	170±2 L_{☉}
Surface gravity (log g)	1.86 cgs
Temperature	4,473±122 K
Metallicity [Fe/H]	−0.01 dex
Rotational velocity (v sin i)	<1 km/s
Age	318^{+30}_{−31} Myr

Other designations
- 19 G. Telescopii, CD−52°8714, CPD−52°11158, GC 25324, HD 170873, HIP 91062, HR 6954, SAO 245559

Database references
SIMBAD	data

HD 170873, also known as HR 6954 or rarely 19 G. Telescopii, is a solitary orange-hued star located in the southern constellation Telescopium. It has an apparent magnitude of 6.20, placing it near the limit for naked eye visibility. Gaia DR3 parallax measurements imply a distance of 551 light years and it is currently receding with a heliocentric radial velocity of 23.8 km/s. At its current distance, HD 170873's brightness is diminished by 0.39 magnitudes due to interstellar dust, and it has an absolute magnitude of −0.31.

HD 170873 is an evolved red giant with a stellar classification of K2 III. It has 3.2 times the mass of the Sun but at the age of 318 million years, it has expanded to 22.6 times the Sun's radius. It radiates 170 times the luminosity of the Sun from its enlarged photosphere at an effective temperature of 4,473 K. It has a near-solar metallicity at [Fe/H] = −0.01 and spins too slowly for its projected rotational velocity to be measured accurately.
