= HD 182893 =

Star in the constellation Telescopium

- Location of HD 182893 (circled)

Observation data Epoch J2000.0 Equinox J2000.0 (ICRS)
- Constellation: Telescopium
- Right ascension: 19^{h} 29^{m} 52.61028^{s}
- Declination: −55° 26′ 30.3051″
- Apparent magnitude (V): 6.13±0.01

Characteristics
- Evolutionary stage: red giant branch
- Spectral type: K0/1 III
- U−B color index: +0.81
- B−V color index: +0.98

Astrometry
Radial velocity (R_{v})	−27.1±0.4 km/s
Proper motion (μ)	RA: +23.472 mas/yr Dec.: −65.581 mas/yr
Parallax (π)	9.9485±0.0394 mas
Distance	328 ± 1 ly (100.5 ± 0.4 pc)
Absolute magnitude (M_{V})	+1.23

Details
Mass	2.42±0.04 M_{☉}
Radius	8.08±0.16 R_{☉}
Luminosity	36.9±0.8 L_{☉}
Surface gravity (log g)	2.94±0.08 cgs
Temperature	5,006±41 K
Metallicity [Fe/H]	+0.16±0.03 dex
Rotational velocity (v sin i)	1.4±1.2 km/s
Age	761±9 Myr

Other designations
- 60 G. Telescopii, CD−55°8180, CPD−55°9096, GC 26883, HD 182893, HIP 95866, HR 7388, SAO 246125

Database references
SIMBAD	data

HD 182893, also known as HR 7388 or rarely 60 G. Telescopii, is a solitary, yellowish-orange hued star located in the southern constellation Telescopium. It has an apparent magnitude of 6.13, making it barely visible to the naked eye even under ideal conditions. Based on Gaia DR3 parallax measurements, the object is estimated to be 328 light years away. However, it is approaching the Solar System with a heliocentric radial velocity of −27 km/s. At its current distance, HD 182893's brightness is diminished by 0.19 magnitudes due to interstellar dust. It has an absolute magnitude of +1.23.

HD 182893 has a stellar classification of K0/1 III, indicating that it is an evolved K-type star with the characteristics of a K0 and K1 giant star. It has 2.42 times the mass of the Sun but at the age of 761 million years, it has expanded to 8.08 times the radius of the Sun. It radiates 36.9 times the luminosity of the Sun from its enlarged photosphere at an effective temperature of 5,006 K. HD 182893 is particularly metal enriched with an iron abundance 145% that of the Sun's ([Fe/H] = +0.16). Like most giant stars it spins slowly, having a projected rotational velocity of 1.4 km/s.
