= HD 173791 =

Star in the constellation Telescopium

Observation data Epoch J2000.0 Equinox ICRS
- Constellation: Telescopium
- Right ascension: 18^{h} 49^{m} 27.3433^{s}
- Declination: –45° 48′ 36.360″
- Apparent magnitude (V): 5.80±0.01

Characteristics
- Evolutionary stage: Horizontal branch
- Spectral type: G8 III
- B−V color index: +0.9

Astrometry
Radial velocity (R_{v})	+9.7±2.9 km/s
Proper motion (μ)	RA: +74.263 mas/yr Dec.: +57.015 mas/yr
Parallax (π)	8.9671±0.0429 mas
Distance	364 ± 2 ly (111.5 ± 0.5 pc)
Absolute magnitude (M_{V})	+0.6

Details
Mass	1.31 M_{☉}
Radius	10.3 R_{☉}
Luminosity	63.6±0.9 L_{☉}
Surface gravity (log g)	2.46 cgs
Temperature	5,093±123 K
Metallicity [Fe/H]	−0.43 ± 0.16 dex
Rotational velocity (v sin i)	2.7±1.5 km/s

Other designations
- 30 G. Telescopii, CPD−45 9479, FK5 3495, HD 173791, HIP 92367, SAO 229306

Database references
SIMBAD	data

HD 173791 (HR 7065) is a solitary yellow hued star located in the southern constellation Telescopium. It has an apparent magnitude of 5.80, allowing it to be viewed with the naked eye under suitable viewing conditions. Parallax measurements place the object at a distance of 364 light years , and it is currently receding from the Solar System with a heliocentric radial velocity of 9.7 km/s.

This is a red giant with a stellar classification of G8 III. It is currently on the cool end of the horizontal branch, fusing helium at its core. At present it has 1.31 times the mass of the Sun but has expanded to 10.3 times its girth. It radiates at 63.6 L_{☉} from its enlarged photosphere at an effective temperature of 5,093 K. HD 173791 is metal deficient–with a metallicity only 37% that of the Sun; it spins modestly with a projected rotational velocity of 2.7 km/s.
