= HD 187086 =

Astrometric binary and suspected variable star

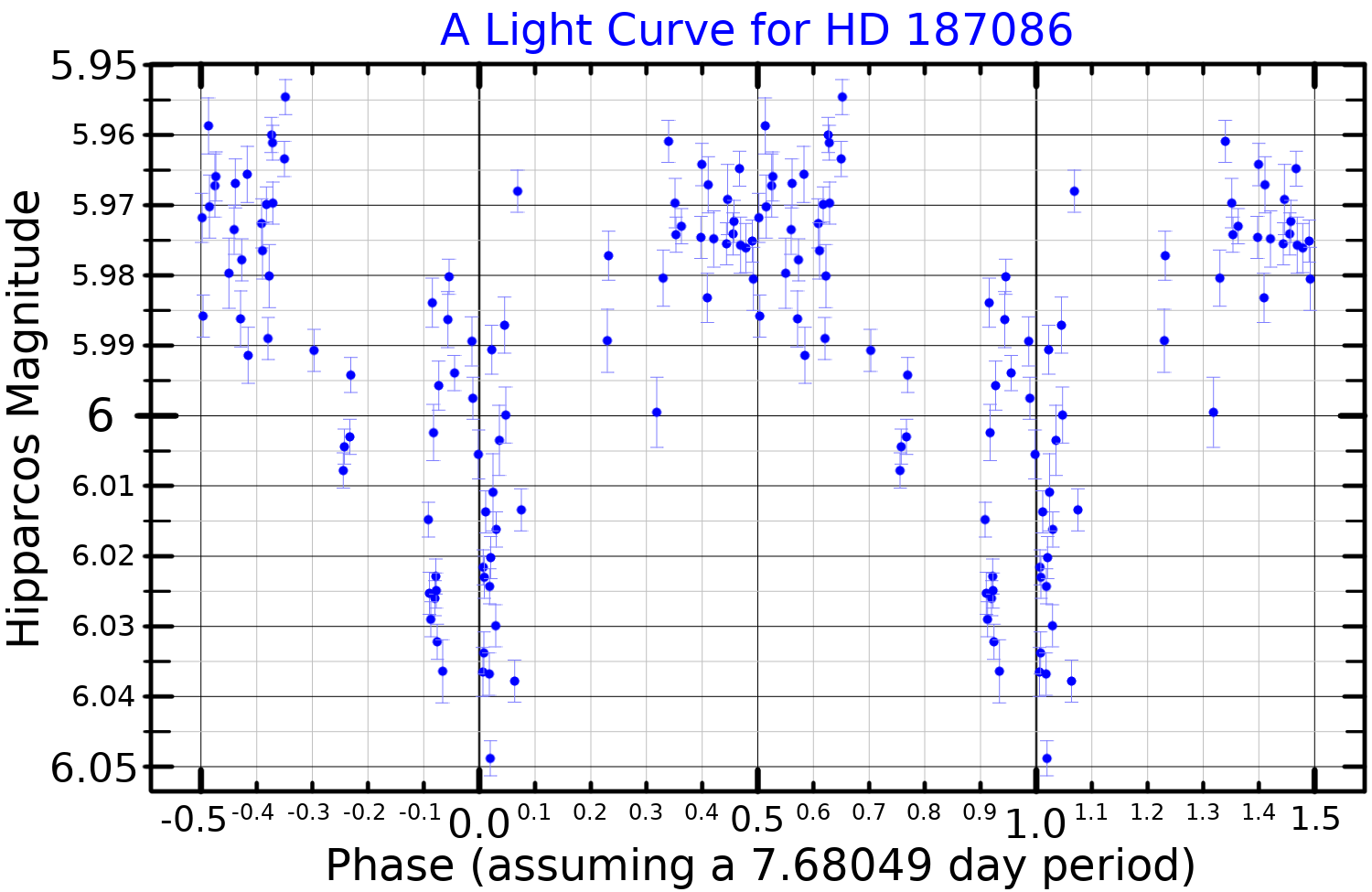
- A light curve for HD 187086, plotted from Hipparcos data

Observation data Epoch J2000.0 Equinox ICRS
- Constellation: Telescopium
- Right ascension: 19^{h} 50^{m} 14.05959^{s}
- Declination: −47° 33′ 26.6014″
- Apparent magnitude (V): 5.95 - 6.07

Characteristics
- Evolutionary stage: AGB
- Spectral type: M1 III
- B−V color index: +1.67
- Variable type: suspected

Astrometry
Radial velocity (R_{v})	−64±1 km/s
Proper motion (μ)	RA: +9.424 mas/yr Dec.: −10.867 mas/yr
Parallax (π)	3.1998±0.0655 mas
Distance	1,020 ± 20 ly (313 ± 6 pc)
Absolute magnitude (M_{V})	−0.80

Details
Mass	1.76±0.09 M_{☉}
Radius	111±6 R_{☉}
Luminosity	1,031±56 L_{☉}
Surface gravity (log g)	1.5±1 cgs
Temperature	3,821±122 K
Metallicity [Fe/H]	+0.24 dex

Other designations
- 69 G. Telescopii, NSV 12432, CD−47°13103, CPD−47°9366, GC 27427, HD 187086, HIP 95798, HR 7537, SAO 229887

Database references
SIMBAD	data

HD 187086, also known as HR 7537, is a probable astrometric binary (87% chance) located in the southern constellation Telescopium. It has an average apparent magnitude of 5.9, making it faintly visible to the naked eye. The star is located relatively far at a distance of 1,020 light years based on Gaia DR3 parallax measurements but is rapidly drifting closer with a heliocentric radial velocity of −64 km/s. At its current distance, HD 187086's brightness is diminished by 0.27 magnitudes due to interstellar dust. It has an absolute magnitude of −0.8.

The primary has a stellar classification of M1 III, indicating that it is a red giant. It is currently on the asymptotic giant branch, fusing hydrogen and helium shells around an inert carbon core. It has 1.76 times the mass of the Sun but it has expanded to 111 times the solar radius. It radiates 1,031 times the luminosity of the Sun from its enlarged photosphere at an effective temperature of 3,821 K, giving it a red hue. HD 187086 is particularly metal enriched ([Fe/H] = +0.24).

HD 187086 fluctuates between 5.95 and 6.07 and its variability was first noticed by P.M. Corben in 1971 after being listed as an ordinary M-type giant a year prior. In 2002, Chris Koen and Laurent Eyer reported that the Hipparcos data shows periodic fluctuations with an amplitude of 0.023 magnitudes, and a period of 7.6805 days. As of 2004 however, it is not confirmed to be variable.
