= MT Pegasi =

Star in the constellation Pegasus

- Visual light curve of MT Pegasi from observations by the All Sky Automated Survey between 2003 and 2009.

Observation data Epoch J2000 Equinox ICRS
- Constellation: Pegasus
- Right ascension: 23^{h} 03^{m} 04.977^{s}
- Declination: +20° 55′ 06.86″
- Apparent magnitude (V): 6.616

Characteristics
- Evolutionary stage: main sequence
- Spectral type: G1 V
- U−B color index: +0.115
- B−V color index: +0.633
- Variable type: BY Dra

Astrometry
Radial velocity (R_{v})	+2.084±0.005 km/s
Proper motion (μ)	RA: −117.123 mas/yr Dec.: −28.530 mas/yr
Parallax (π)	41.1604±0.0232 mas
Distance	79.24 ± 0.04 ly (24.30 ± 0.01 pc)
Absolute magnitude (M_{V})	4.65±0.03

Details
Mass	1.066+0.020 −0.030 M_{☉}
Radius	1.01+0.04 −0.02 R_{☉}
Luminosity	1.07+0.12 −0.10 L_{☉}
Surface gravity (log g)	4.47+0.02 −0.04 cgs
Temperature	5,885±44 K
Metallicity [Fe/H]	−0.03±0.03 dex
Rotation	5.82±1.47 days
Rotational velocity (v sin i)	3.2±0.05 km/s
Age	1.20+2.16 −1.20 Gyr

Other designations
- MT Peg, BD+20° 5264, HD 217813, HIP 113829, SAO 90973

Database references
SIMBAD	data

MT Pegasi is a single, yellow-hued star in the northern constellation of Pegasus. It has the designation HD 217813 in the Henry Draper Catalogue; MT Pegasi is the variable star designation. With an apparent visual magnitude of 6.616, it is a dim star that is at or below the nominal limit for visibility with the naked eye. Based upon an annual parallax shift of 41.16 mas as measured from Earth's orbit, it is located 79.24 light years away. This star is a member of the Ursa Major Moving Group, a collection of stars that originated in the same open cluster and now share a common motion through space.

This is a G-type main-sequence star with a stellar classification of G1 V. Harlan and Taylor (1970) had assigned it a class of G5 V, but this gives a poor match to the color index. HD 217813 was found to be variable in 1995 and hence it was given the variable star designation MT Pegasi (MT Peg). It displays brightness variations with a period of several days, which is caused by star spots that are modulated by the star's rotation period. MT Peg is classified as a BY Draconis variable.

MT Peg is considered a young solar analog, which means it is a solar-type star representative of how a young, more active Sun may have appeared when it was less than 1.5 billion years old. The estimated age based upon the chromospheric activity level is 397 million years, per Gray et al. (2015). Marsden et al. (2014) gave a larger age estimate of 1.2 billion years, but with a margin of error that overlaps the younger value. Age estimates of the Ursa Major group are around 300 million years old.

The star has 1.07 times the mass of the Sun and 1.01 times the Sun's radius. It is spinning with a projected rotational velocity of 3.2 km/s, giving it a rotation period of 5.8 days. The elemental composition of the stellar atmosphere is similar to the Sun. MT Peg is radiating 1.07 times the Sun's luminosity from its photosphere at an effective temperature of 5,885 K.
