= HD 182509 =

Star in the constellation of Telescopium

Observation data Epoch J2000.0 Equinox ICRS
- Constellation: Telescopium
- Right ascension: 19^{h} 27^{m} 48.11739^{s}
- Declination: −54° 19′ 30.9786″
- Apparent magnitude (V): 5.69±0.01

Characteristics
- Evolutionary stage: red giant branch
- Spectral type: K4 III
- U−B color index: +1.68
- B−V color index: +1.40

Astrometry
Radial velocity (R_{v})	−5±4.3 km/s
Proper motion (μ)	RA: −5.554 mas/yr Dec.: +9.807 mas/yr
Parallax (π)	5.1371±0.0763 mas
Distance	635 ± 9 ly (195 ± 3 pc)
Absolute magnitude (M_{V})	−0.38

Details
Mass	1.12 M_{☉}
Radius	32.6 R_{☉}
Luminosity	329 L_{☉}
Surface gravity (log g)	1.35 cgs
Temperature	4,316±122 K
Metallicity [Fe/H]	−0.02 dex
Rotational velocity (v sin i)	<1 km/s

Other designations
- 59 G. Telescopii, CD−54°8308, CPD−54°9371, FK5 1504, GC 26834, HD 182509, HIP 95690, HR 7370, SAO 246110, WDS J19278-5420A

Database references
SIMBAD	data

HD 182509, also designated as HR 7370, is an orange hued star located in the southern constellation Telescopium. It has an apparent magnitude of 5.69, making it faintly visible to the naked eye if viewed under ideal conditions. Parallax measurements place the object at a distance of 635 light years. It has a poorly constrained heliocentric radial velocity of −5 km/s, indicating that it is drifting towards the Solar System.

HD 182509 has a stellar classification of K4 III, indicating that it is a red giant. Gaia DR3 stellar evolution models place it on the red giant branch. It has 1.12 times the mass of the Sun but has expanded to 32.6 times its girth. It shines with a luminosity of 329 L_{☉} from its enlarged photosphere at an effective temperature of 4,316 K. HD 182509 iron abundance is 95% that of the Sun, placing it at solar metallicity. Like most giants, it spins slowly with a projected rotational velocity of <1 km/s.

HD 182466 is a high proper motion star located 76.1″ away along a position angle of 236°. Eggleton and Tokovonin (2008) list the pair as a binary star. However, its parallax and proper motion indicate that it is instead a foreground object. Components C and D are instead faint optical background objects, while the E component is probably non-existent.
