= Mu Telescopii =

Star in the constellation Telescopium

μ Telescopii
Observation data Epoch J2000.0 Equinox ICRS
- Constellation: Telescopium
- Right ascension: 19^{h} 30^{m} 34.6118^{s}
- Declination: −55° 06′ 36.190″
- Apparent magnitude (V): 6.28±0.01

Characteristics
- Evolutionary stage: main sequence
- Spectral type: F5 V
- B−V color index: +0.45

Astrometry
Radial velocity (R_{v})	8.6±0.3 km/s
Proper motion (μ)	RA: +38.548 mas/yr Dec.: −11.540 mas/yr
Parallax (π)	27.6727±0.0284 mas
Distance	117.9 ± 0.1 ly (36.14 ± 0.04 pc)
Absolute magnitude (M_{V})	+3.61

Details
Mass	1.28 M_{☉}
Radius	1.40^{+0.07}_{−0.05} R_{☉}
Luminosity	3.22±0.01 L_{☉}
Surface gravity (log g)	4.3±0.1 cgs
Temperature	6,570±136 K
Metallicity [Fe/H]	−0.06 dex
Rotational velocity (v sin i)	6.9±0.5 km/s
Age	2.12 Gyr

Other designations
- μ Tel, 61 G. Telescopii, CPD−55°8188, HD 183028, HIP 95932, HR 7393, SAO 246131

Database references
SIMBAD	data

Mu Telescopii, Latinized from μ Telescopii is a solitary star in the southern constellation Telescopium. It has an apparent visual magnitude of 6.28, placing it near the limit of naked eye visibility. The object is relatively close at a distance of 118 light years but is receding with a heliocentric radial velocity of 8.6 km/s.

Mu Telescopii has a stellar classification of F5 V, indicating that it is an ordinary F-type main sequence star. It has been noted to be chromospherically active. The star is 2.12 billion years old with a current mass of 1.28 M_{☉}, and has a diameter 1.4 times that of the Sun. It is radiating 3.22 times the luminosity of the Sun from its photosphere at an effective temperature of 6,570 K, giving a yellow white hue. Mu Telescopii is slightly metal deficient with an iron abundance 87% that of the Sun and spins with a projected rotational velocity of 6.9 km/s.

It has been observed for infrared excess suggesting the presence of a debris disk but so far, none has been found.
