= HD 179886 =

Binary star system in the constellation Telescopium

- Location of HD 179886 (circled)

Observation data Epoch J2000.0 Equinox ICRS
- Constellation: Telescopium
- Right ascension: 19^{h} 16^{m} 21.7422^{s}
- Declination: −45° 27′ 57.704″
- Apparent magnitude (V): 5.371 (5.59 + 8.63)

Characteristics
- Evolutionary stage: red giant branch
- Spectral type: K3 III
- B−V color index: +1.35

Astrometry
Radial velocity (R_{v})	6.3±0.8 km/s
Proper motion (μ)	RA: −3.013 mas/yr Dec.: +10.017 mas/yr
Parallax (π)	4.6441±0.1537 mas
Distance	700 ± 20 ly (215 ± 7 pc)
Absolute magnitude (M_{V})	−0.7

Details
Mass	1.11 M_{☉}
Radius	36.75 R_{☉}
Luminosity	365 L_{☉}
Surface gravity (log g)	1.3 cgs
Temperature	4,622 K
Metallicity [Fe/H]	+0.15 dex
Rotational velocity (v sin i)	2.4±1.1 km/s

Other designations
- 51 G. Telescopii, CD−45°13072, CPD−45°9660, GC 26526, HD 179886, HIP 94712, HR 7289, SAO 229584, WDS J19164-4528AB

Database references
SIMBAD	data

HD 179886 (HR 7289) is a binary star located in the southern constellation Telescopium. It has a combined apparent magnitude of 5.37, making it faintly visible to the naked eye if viewed under ideal conditions. The system is situated at a distance of 700 light years but is receding with a heliocentric radial velocity of 6.3 km/s.

As of 2018, the two stars have a separation of 0.4 arcseconds along a position angle of 205°

The brighter component has a stellar classification of K3 III, indicating that the object is an ageing K-type giant. Models show it to be on the red giant branch, a stage of stellar evolution where the star is fusing hydrogen in a shell around an inert core of helium. It has an angular diameter of 1.95±0.03, yielding a diameter 37 times that of the Sun at its estimated distance. At present it has 111% the mass of the Sun and radiates at 365 L_{☉} from its enlarged photosphere at an effective temperature of 4,622 K, giving it an orange glow. HD 179886A has a metallicity 141% that of the Sun and spins modestly with a projected rotational velocity of 2.4 km/s.
