= PW Telescopii =

Α2 CVn variable; Telescopium

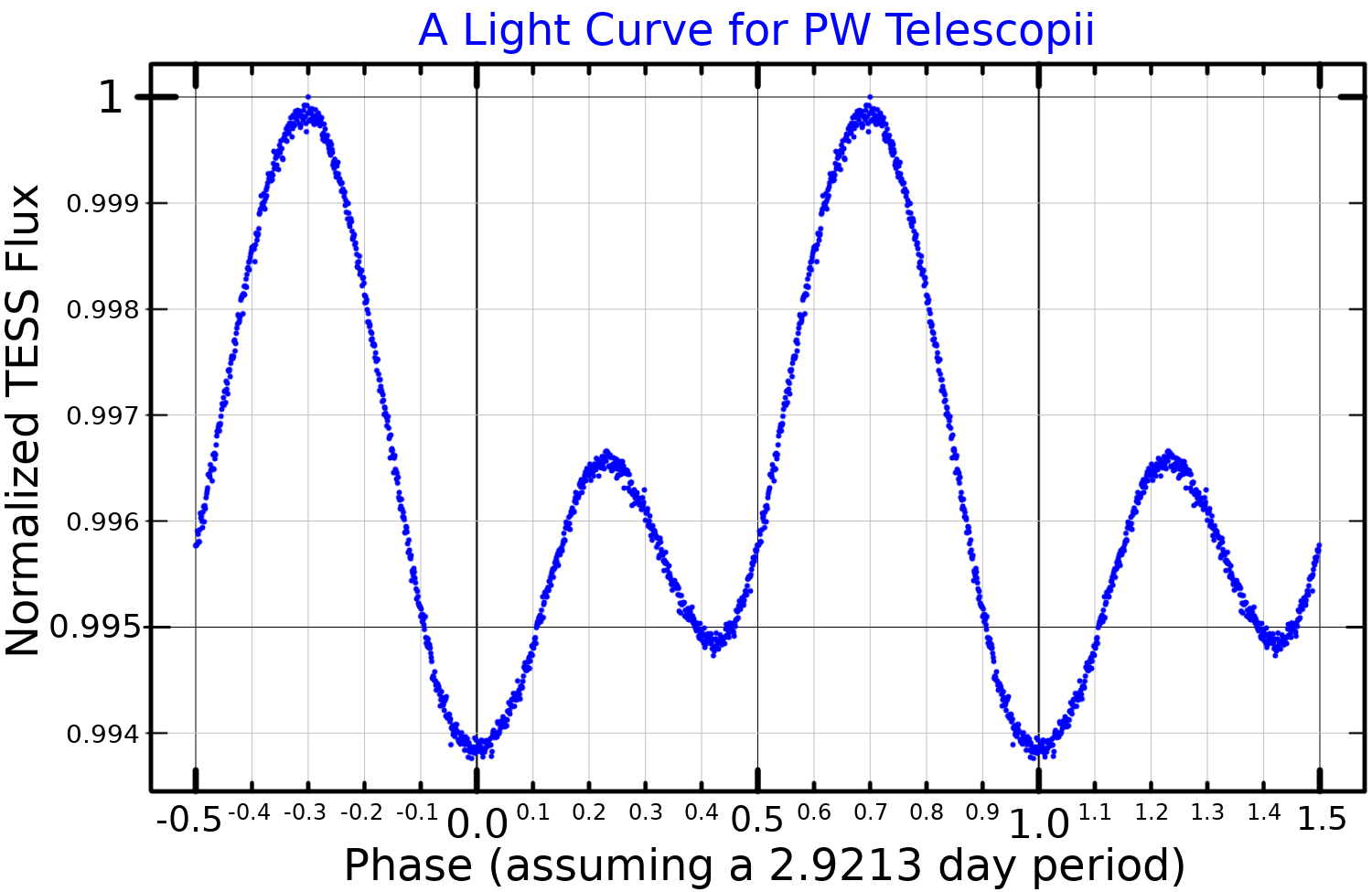
- A light curve for PW Telescopii, plotted from TESS data

Observation data Epoch J2000 Equinox ICRS
- Constellation: Telescopium
- Right ascension: 19^{h} 33^{m} 21.62239^{s}
- Declination: −45° 16′ 18.3946″
- Apparent magnitude (V): 5.58±0.01

Characteristics
- Evolutionary stage: main sequence
- Spectral type: A0 Vp (SrCr)
- B−V color index: −0.04
- Variable type: α^{2} CVn

Astrometry
Radial velocity (R_{v})	−10.3±2.7 km/s
Proper motion (μ)	RA: −17.146 mas/yr Dec.: −24.625 mas/yr
Parallax (π)	8.2532±0.1701 mas
Distance	395 ± 8 ly (121 ± 2 pc)
Absolute magnitude (M_{V})	+0.17

Details
Mass	2.79±0.14 M_{☉}
Radius	3.41 R_{☉}
Luminosity	100^{+26}_{−21} L_{☉}
Surface gravity (log g)	3.68 cgs
Temperature	10,070 K
Metallicity [Fe/H]	+1.09 dex
Rotational velocity (v sin i)	55±6 km/s
Age	363 Myr

Other designations
- 63 G. Telescopii, PW Tel, CD−45°13296, CPD−45°9740, FK5 3558, GC 29681, HD 183806, HIP 96178, HR 7416, SAO 229741

Database references
SIMBAD	data

PW Telescopii, also known as HD 183806 or simply PW Tel, is a solitary variable star located in the southern constellation Telescopium. It has an average apparent magnitude of 5.58, making it faintly visible to the naked eye. Based on parallax measurements from the Gaia satellite, the star is estimated to be 395 light years distant. It appears to be approaching the Solar System with a heliocentric radial velocity of −10 km/s. The value is somewhat constrained, having an uncertainty of 26%. At its current distance, PW Tel's brightness is diminished by 0.05 magnitudes due to interstellar dust.

PW Tel was first noticed to vary in brightness in observations taken in 1978 by Pierre Renson. The star was confirmed as a variable and given the variable star designation PW Telescopii in 1981. Further observations by Jean Manfroid in 1985 improved earlier data, including the star's period. PW Tel is an α^{2} CVn variable with an amplitude of 0.011 magnitudes within the visual passband and a period of 2.92 days.

With a stellar classification of A0 Vp (SrCr), PW Tel is a chemically peculiar A-type main-sequence star. It has been recognised as an Ap star, as indicated by the "p" suffix, since the early 20th century, and it shows an overabundance of strontium and chromium in its spectrum. The abundance of some metals in the spectrum is several hundred times higher than in the Sun, and it has an overall metallicity of [Fe/H] = 1.09, but this only reflects levels of those elements in the photosphere, not the whole star. Like most such stars, it spins relatively slowly, with a projected rotational velocity of 55 km/s.

With 2.8 times the mass of the Sun and 3.4 times its radius, PV Tel radiates 100 times the luminosity of the Sun from its photosphere at an effective temperature of 10,070 K, giving it a bluish-white hue. PW Tel is metal-enriched, having an iron abundance over 10 times that of the Sun.
