= HD 180134 =

F-type star with a circumstellar disk

- Location of HD 180134

Observation data Epoch J2000.0 Equinox ICRS
- Constellation: Telescopium
- Right ascension: 19^{h} 18^{m} 09.78130^{s}
- Declination: −53° 23′ 13.5119″
- Apparent magnitude (V): 6.36±0.01

Characteristics
- Evolutionary stage: main sequence
- Spectral type: F7 V
- B−V color index: +0.49

Astrometry
Radial velocity (R_{v})	−22.5±0.3 km/s
Proper motion (μ)	RA: +24.761 mas/yr Dec.: −81.714 mas/yr
Parallax (π)	21.9768±0.0272 mas
Distance	148.4 ± 0.2 ly (45.50 ± 0.06 pc)
Absolute magnitude (M_{V})	+3.09

Details
Mass	1.32 M_{☉}
Radius	1.90±0.07 R_{☉}
Luminosity	4.93±0.01 L_{☉}
Surface gravity (log g)	4.07±0.04 cgs
Temperature	6,230±55 K
Metallicity [Fe/H]	−0.03±0.05 dex
Rotational velocity (v sin i)	10±3 km/s
Age	3.28±0.51 Gyr

Other designations
- 52 G. Telescopii, CD−53°8089, CPD−53°9513, GC 26573, HD 180134, HIP 94858, HR 7297, SAO 246017

Database references
SIMBAD	data

HD 180134 (HR 7297; 52 G. Telescopii) is a solitary star located in the southern constellation Telescopium. It has an apparent magnitude of 6.36, placing it near the limit for naked eye visibility, even under ideal conditions. The object is located relatively close at a distance of 148.4 light-years based on Gaia DR3 parallax measurements, and it is drifting closer with a heliocentric radial velocity of −22.5 km/s. At its current distance, HD 180134's brightness is diminished by two-tenths of a magnitude due to interstellar extinction and it has an absolute magnitude of +3.09.

HD 180134 has a stellar classification of F7 V, indicating that it is an ordinary F-type main-sequence star that is currently generating energy via hydrogen fusion at its core. It has 1.32 times the mass of the Sun and 1.9 times the radius of the Sun. It radiates 4.93 times the luminosity of the Sun from its photosphere at an effective temperature of 6,230 K, giving a whitish-yellow hue when viewed in the night sky. HD 180134 is slightly metal deficient with an iron abundance 93% that of the Sun or [Fe/H] = −0.03, and it spins modestly with a projected rotational velocity of approximately 10 km/s. At the age of 3.28 billion years, it is 1.49 magnitudes above the zero age main sequence, meaning that it is evolved.

In 2006, an infrared excess was detected around the star, which could indicate the presence of a circumstellar disk. The disk has a temperature less than 145 K, making it a cool disk; it has an angular separation greater than 0.19 arcseconds or a physical separation greater than 8.6 astronomical units.
