= HD 170069 =

Star in the constellation Telescopium

Observation data Epoch J2000.0 Equinox ICRS
- Constellation: Telescopium
- Right ascension: 18^{h} 29^{m} 55.9414^{s}
- Declination: −47° 13′ 13.950″
- Apparent magnitude (V): 5.68±0.01

Characteristics
- Spectral type: K2 III
- B−V color index: +1.26

Astrometry
Radial velocity (R_{v})	−18±4.3 km/s
Proper motion (μ)	RA: +28.685 mas/yr Dec.: −12.434 mas/yr
Parallax (π)	5.5748±0.1894 mas
Distance	590 ± 20 ly (179 ± 6 pc)
Absolute magnitude (M_{V})	−0.78

Details
Mass	4.08 M_{☉}
Radius	23.69 R_{☉}
Luminosity	217 L_{☉}
Surface gravity (log g)	1.46 cgs
Temperature	4490±125 K
Rotational velocity (v sin i)	<1 km/s

Other designations
- 15 G. Telescopii, CD−47°12319, CPD−47°8894, GC 25216, HD 170069, HIP 90662, HR 6922, SAO 229064

Database references
SIMBAD	data

HD 170069 (HR 6922) is a solitary star in the southern constellation Telescopium. It has an apparent magnitude of 5.68, allowing it to be faintly seen with the naked eye. The star is located at a distance of 590 light years but is approaching closer with a heliocentric radial velocity of −18 km/s. HD 170069 was designated as Tau Telescopii (τ Telescopii) before Benjamin Apthorp Gould dropped the title.

HD 170069 has a stellar classification of K2 III, indicating that it is a red giant. It has 4.08 times the mass of the Sun but has expanded to 23.69 times its girth. It radiates at 217 times the luminosity of the Sun from its enlarged photosphere at an effective temperature of 4,490 K, giving an orange hue. Due to its evolved state, it has a projected rotational velocity that is less than 1 km/s.
