= HD 189080 =

Star in the constellation of Telescopium

- Location of HD 189080 (circled)

Observation data Epoch J2000.0 Equinox ICRS
- Constellation: Telescopium
- Right ascension: 20^{h} 00^{m} 25.32793^{s}
- Declination: −49° 21′ 03.4019″
- Apparent magnitude (V): 6.18±0.01

Characteristics
- Evolutionary stage: red giant branch
- Spectral type: K0 III
- U−B color index: +0.92
- B−V color index: +1.06

Astrometry
Radial velocity (R_{v})	66.9±0.4 km/s
Proper motion (μ)	RA: −77.932 mas/yr Dec.: −2.298 mas/yr
Parallax (π)	9.1277±0.0321 mas
Distance	357 ± 1 ly (109.6 ± 0.4 pc)
Absolute magnitude (M_{V})	+1.10

Details
Mass	1.19^{+0.16}_{−0.29} M_{☉}
Radius	9.9±0.5 R_{☉}
Luminosity	43.6±1.0 L_{☉}
Surface gravity (log g)	2.46^{+0.09}_{−0.10} cgs
Temperature	4,742±49 K
Metallicity [Fe/H]	−0.11±0.03 dex
Rotational velocity (v sin i)	<1 km/s
Age	4.83^{+2.53}_{−3.22} Gyr

Other designations
- 74 G. Telescopii, CD−49°12949, CPD−49°11118, FK5 3595, GC 27678, HD 189080, HIP 98482, HR 7621, SAO 229973

Database references
SIMBAD	data

HD 189080, also known as HR 7621 or rarely 74 G. Telescopii, is a solitary orange-hued star located in the southern constellation Telescopium. It has an apparent magnitude of 6.18, placing it near the limit for naked eye visibility. Gaia DR3 parallax measurements place it at a distance of 357 light years and it is currently receding rapidly with a heliocentric radial velocity of 66.9 km/s. At its current distance, HD 189080's brightness is diminished by 0.17 magnitudes due to extinction from interstellar dust. It has an absolute magnitude of +1.1.

This is an evolved red giant with a stellar classification of K0 III. It is currently on the red giant branch, fusing a hydrogen shell around an inert helium core. It has 119% the mass of the Sun, but at the age of 4.83 billion years it has expanded to 9.9 times the radius of the Sun. It radiates 43.6 times the luminosity of the Sun from its enlarged photosphere at an effective temperature of 4,742 K. HD 189080 is slightly metal deficient with [Fe/H] = −0.11 and spins too slowly to be measured accurately.
