= Lambda Telescopii =

Star in the constellation Telescopus

λ Telescopii
- Location of λ Tel (circled)

Observation data Epoch J2000.0 Equinox J2000.0 (ICRS)
- Constellation: Telescopium
- Right ascension: 18^{h} 58^{m} 27.79251^{s}
- Declination: −52° 56′ 19.1999″
- Apparent magnitude (V): 4.84±0.01

Characteristics
- Evolutionary stage: main sequence
- Spectral type: B9.5 IV/V or B9 III
- B−V color index: −0.05

Astrometry
Radial velocity (R_{v})	−2±4.2 km/s
Proper motion (μ)	RA: +13.365 mas/yr Dec.: −8.805 mas/yr
Parallax (π)	6.6117±0.1718 mas
Distance	490 ± 10 ly (151 ± 4 pc)
Absolute magnitude (M_{V})	−1.51

Details
Mass	2.81^{+0.36}_{−0.38} M_{☉}
Radius	5.53±0.28 R_{☉}
Luminosity	260^{+13}_{−12} L_{☉}
Surface gravity (log g)	3.56 cgs
Temperature	10,139 K
Metallicity [Fe/H]	+0.19 dex
Rotational velocity (v sin i)	110 km/s
Age	268 Myr

Other designations
- λ Tel, 41 G. Telescopii, CPD−53°9402, FK5 708, GC 26016, HD 175510, HIP 93148, HR 7134, SAO 245834

Database references
SIMBAD	data

λ Telescopii, Latinized as Lambda Telescopii, is a solitary, bluish-white hued star located in the southern constellation of Telescopium. It has an apparent magnitude of 4.84, making it readily visible to the naked eye under ideal conditions. Gaia DR3 parallax measurements imply a distance of 490 light years, and it is currently approaching the Solar System with a somewhat constrained heliocentric radial velocity of −2 km/s. At its current distance, the visual magnitude of Lambda Telescopii is diminished by an extinction of 0.25 due to interstellar dust and it has an absolute magnitude of −1.51.

The object has been given several stellar classifications over the years. Lambda Telescopii has been classified as B9 III (evolved giant star), A0 V (A-type main-sequence star), and B9 .5 IV/V.

The accepted classification for Lambda Telescopii is B9.5 IV/V, indicating that it is a late B-type star with the blended luminosity class of a subgiant and a main sequence star. Gaia DR3 stellar evolution models place it near the end of its main sequence lifetime. The star is 268 million years old with a relatively high rate of spin, showing a projected rotational velocity of 110 km/s. Lambda Telescopii is metal enriched with an iron abundance 155% that of the Sun, or [Fe/H] = +0.19. The star has 2.81 times the mass of the Sun and it radiates 260 times the luminosity of the Sun from its photosphere – which is 5.53 times the size of the Sun's – at an effective temperature of 10,193 K.
