= HD 177693 =

K-type giant in the constellation Telescopium

- Location of HD 177693 on the map (circled)

Observation data Epoch J2000.0 Equinox ICRS
- Constellation: Telescopium
- Right ascension: 19^{h} 08^{m} 52.32474^{s}
- Declination: −55° 43′ 13.5297″
- Apparent magnitude (V): 6.45±0.01

Characteristics
- Spectral type: K1 III or K1 IV
- B−V color index: +1.10

Astrometry
Radial velocity (R_{v})	−20.9±2.9 km/s
Proper motion (μ)	RA: +56.586 mas/yr Dec.: −115.876 mas/yr
Parallax (π)	8.6669±0.0269 mas
Distance	376 ± 1 ly (115.4 ± 0.4 pc)
Absolute magnitude (M_{V})	+1.03

Details
Mass	1.25 M_{☉}
Radius	10.6 R_{☉}
Luminosity	50.2^{+0.4}_{−0.3} L_{☉}
Surface gravity (log g)	2.52 cgs
Temperature	4,750±122 K
Metallicity [Fe/H]	−0.10 dex
Rotational velocity (v sin i)	<1.3 km/s

Other designations
- 48 G. Telescopii, CPD−55°9001, GC 26319, HD 177693, HIP 94054, HR 7233, SAO 245937, TIC 230953185

Database references
SIMBAD	data

HD 177693 (HR 7233; 48 G. Telescopii) is a solitary orange-hued star located in the southern constellation Telescopium. It has an apparent magnitude of 6.45, placing it near the limit for naked eye visibility, even under ideal conditions. Gaia DR3 parallax measurements imply a distance of 376 light-years, and it is drifting closer with a heliocentric radial velocity of −20.9 km/s. At its current distance, HD 177693's brightness is diminished by 0.24 magnitudes due to interstellar extinction and it has an absolute magnitude of +1.03.

HD 177693 has a stellar classification of K1 III, indicating that it is an evolved orange giant. David Stanley Evans gave a less evolved class of K1 IV, instead indicating that it is a slightly evolved subgiant. It has 1.25 times the mass of the Sun but it has expanded to 10.6 times the radius of the Sun. It radiates 50.2 times the luminosity of the Sun from its enlarged photosphere at an effective temperature of 4,750 K. HD 177693 is slightly metal deficient with an iron abundance of [Fe/H] = −0.10 and it spins with a projected rotational velocity lower than 1.3 km/s.
