= HD 176664 =

High proper motion star; K-type giant

- Location of HD 176664 (circled)

Observation data Epoch J2000.0 Equinox J2000.0 (ICRS)
- Constellation: Telescopium
- Right ascension: 19^{h} 03^{m} 57.55905^{s}
- Declination: −51° 01′ 06.9715″
- Apparent magnitude (V): 5.93±0.01

Characteristics
- Evolutionary stage: red giant branch
- Spectral type: K0/1 III
- B−V color index: +1.24

Astrometry
| Radial velocity (R_{v}) | −60.2±0.4 km/s |
| Proper motion (μ) | RA: +40.300 mas/yr Dec.: −147.992 mas/yr |
| Parallax (π) | 11.1536±0.0456 mas |
| Distance | 292 ± 1 ly (89.7 ± 0.4 pc) |
| Absolute magnitude (M_{V}) | +0.94 |

Details
| Mass | 1.17 M_{☉} |
| Radius | 12.4±0.6 R_{☉} |
| Luminosity | 49.9±0.4 L_{☉} |
| Surface gravity (log g) | 2.42 cgs |
| Temperature | 4,546±122 K |
| Metallicity [Fe/H] | +0.25 dex |
| Rotational velocity (v sin i) | <1 km/s |
| Age | 377 Myr |

Other designations
- 43 G. Telescopii, CD−51°11893, CPD−51°11104, HD 176664, HIP 93624, HR 7190, SAO 245899, CCDM J19040-5101A, WDS J19040-5101A

Database references
| SIMBAD | data |

HD 176664 (HR 7190; 43 G. Telescopii) is a solitary star located in the southern constellation Telescopium. It is faintly visible to the naked eye as an orange-hued star with an apparent magnitude of 5.93. The object is located relatively close at a distance of 292 light years based on Gaia DR3 parallax measurements but is rapidly approaching the Solar System with a heliocentric radial velocity of −60 km/s. At its current distance, HD 176664's brightness is diminished by two-tenths of a magnitude due to interstellar dust, and it has an absolute magnitude of +0.94.

HD 176664 has a stellar classification of K0/1 III, indicating that it is an evolved K-type star with a spectrum intermediate of a K0 and K1 giant star. It has a comparable mass to the Sun but it has expanded to 12.4 times its girth. It radiates 49.9 times the luminosity of the Sun from its enlarged photosphere at an effective temperature of 4,546 K. HD 176664 is metal enriched ([Fe/H] = +0.25), and it spins too slowly to be measured accurately. A 1993 paper by Olin J. Eggen lists HD 176664 as a member of the Milky Way's old disk population.

The star has two optical companions designated CD −51°11893B and CD −51°11893C. B is a distant 13th magnitude star located 19.4" away along a position angle of 9° while C is a 12th magnitude star located 27.5" away along a position angle of 29°.
