= HD 192886 =

High proper motion star; F-type dwarf

- Location of HD 192886 and HD 192827 (circled)

Observation data Epoch J2000.0 Equinox ICRS
- Constellation: Telescopium
- Right ascension: 20^{h} 19^{m} 17.85169^{s}
- Declination: −47° 34′ 49.0453″
- Apparent magnitude (V): 6.13

Characteristics
- Evolutionary stage: main sequence
- Spectral type: F5 V or F6 IV-V
- U−B color index: +0.01
- B−V color index: +0.46

Astrometry
Radial velocity (R_{v})	−29.6±0.6 km/s
Proper motion (μ)	RA: +192.878 mas/yr Dec.: −183.183 mas/yr
Parallax (π)	31.657±0.028 mas
Distance	103.03 ± 0.09 ly (31.59 ± 0.03 pc)
Absolute magnitude (M_{V})	+3.69

Details
Mass	1.32^{+0.27}_{−0.16} M_{☉}
Radius	1.39±0.07 R_{☉}
Luminosity	2.92±0.01 L_{☉}
Surface gravity (log g)	4.32 cgs
Temperature	6,459±52 K
Metallicity [Fe/H]	+0.02 dex
Rotational velocity (v sin i)	11.6±1.1 km/s
Age	2.23 Gyr

Other designations
- 84 G. Telescopii, CD−47°13340, CPD−47°9478, GC 28213, HD 192886, HIP 100184, HR 7749, SAO 230150, LTT 8083

Database references
SIMBAD	data

HD 192886, also known as HR 7749 or rarely 84 G. Telescopii, is a solitary, yellowish-white hued star located in the southern constellation Telescopium. It has an apparent magnitude of 6.13, making it barely visible to the naked eye, even in ideal conditions. The object is located relatively close at a distance of only 103 light years but is drifting closer with a heliocentric radial velocity of −29.6 km/s. At its current distance, HD 192886's brightness is diminished by 0.13 magnitudes due to extinction from interstellar dust. It has an absolute magnitude of +3.69.

HD 192886 has a stellar classification of F5 V, making it an ordinary F-type main-sequence star. However, Richard O. Gray and colleagues give it a class of F6 IV-V, indicating that it is slightly cooler and more evolved. It has 1.32 times the mass of the Sun and 1.39 times the Sun's radius. It radiates 2.92 times the luminosity of the Sun from its photosphere at an effective temperature of 6,459 K. It has a solar metallicity ([Fe/H] = +0.02) and is estimated to be 2.23 billion years old. HD 192886 is more likely a main sequence star because it is only 0.24 magnitudes above the main sequence. The star spins modestly with a projected rotational velocity of 11.6 km/s.
