= HD 174387 =

Star in the constellation of Telescopium

- Location of HD 174837 and HD 174500 (circled)

Observation data Epoch J2000.0 Equinox ICRS
- Constellation: Telescopium
- Right ascension: 18^{h} 52^{m} 27.2298^{s}
- Declination: −46° 35′ 42.433″
- Apparent magnitude (V): 5.49±0.01

Characteristics
- Spectral type: M0 III
- B−V color index: +1.63
- Variable type: suspected

Astrometry
Radial velocity (R_{v})	−28.1±0.9 km/s
Proper motion (μ)	RA: +28.229 mas/yr Dec.: −0.941 mas/yr
Parallax (π)	4.0175±0.1091 mas
Distance	810 ± 20 ly (249 ± 7 pc)
Absolute magnitude (M_{V})	−1.97

Details
Mass	1.14 M_{☉}
Radius	82.63 R_{☉}
Luminosity	902 L_{☉}
Surface gravity (log g)	0.79 cgs
Temperature	3929±122 K
Metallicity [Fe/H]	−0.04 dex

Other designations
- 33 G. Telescopii, NSV 24617, CD−46°12669, CPD−46°9512, GC 25861, HD 174387, HIP 92630, HR 7092, SAO 229336

Database references
SIMBAD	data

HD 174387 (HR 7092) is a solitary star in the southern constellation Telescopium. With an apparent magnitude of 5.49, it is faintly visible to the naked eye if viewed under dark skies. Parallax measurements put the object at a distance of 810 light years and it is currently approaching the Solar System with a heliocentric radial velocity of −28.1 km/s.

HD 174387 has a stellar classification of M0 III, indicating that it is an ageing red giant. Due to its evolved state, the star has expanded to a diameter of 82.63 R_{☉}. At present it has 114% the mass of the Sun and shines 902 times the luminosity of the Sun from its enlarged photosphere at an effective temperature of 3,929 K, giving a red hue when viewed. HD 174387's metallicity is estimated to be 91% that of the Sun. The star is suspected to be variable, ranging from magnitudes 5.59 to 5.63 in the Hipparcos passband.
