= HD 190422 =

F-type main-sequence star; Telescopium

- Location of HD 190422(circled)

Observation data Epoch J2000.0 Equinox ICRS
- Constellation: Telescopium
- Right ascension: 20^{h} 07^{m} 35.09061^{s}
- Declination: −55° 00′ 57.6492″
- Apparent magnitude (V): 6.25±0.01

Characteristics
- Evolutionary stage: main sequence
- Spectral type: F9 V CH−0.4
- B−V color index: +0.53

Astrometry
Radial velocity (R_{v})	12.7±0.3 km/s
Proper motion (μ)	RA: +18.283 mas/yr Dec.: +35.310 mas/yr
Parallax (π)	41.5069±0.028 mas
Distance	78.58 ± 0.05 ly (24.09 ± 0.02 pc)
Absolute magnitude (M_{V})	+4.41

Details
Mass	1.25 M_{☉}
Radius	1.09±0.05 R_{☉}
Luminosity	1.534^{+0.006}_{−0.005} L_{☉}
Surface gravity (log g)	4.42 cgs
Temperature	6,235±100 K
Metallicity [Fe/H]	−0.13±0.03 dex
Rotation	27.2 d
Rotational velocity (v sin i)	15.6±0.8 km/s
Age	400 Myr

Other designations
- 77 G. Telescopii, CD−55°8393, CPD−55°9317, GC 27884, HD 190422, HIP 99137, HR 7674, SAO 246444

Database references
SIMBAD	data

HD 190422, also known as HR 7674 or rarely 77 G. Telescopii, is a solitary star located in the southern constellation Telescopium. It has an apparent magnitude of +6.25, placing it near the limit for naked eye, even under ideal conditions. At its current distance, HD 190422's brightness is diminished by 0.11 magnitudes due to extinction from interstellar dust and it has an absolute magnitude of +4.41.

The star is located relatively close at a distance of 79 light years based on Gaia DR3 parallax measurements but it is receding with a heliocentric radial velocity of 12.7 km/s. Approximately 1.6 million years ago, HD 190422 was located 7.806 parsecs (25.46 ly) away from the Sun.

HD 190422 has a stellar classification of F9 V CH−0.4, indicating that it is a F-type main-sequence star with a mild underabundance of the CH radical in its spectrum. It has 125% the mass of the Sun and 109% of the Sun's radius. It radiates 1.534 times the luminosity of the Sun from its photosphere at an effective temperature of 6,235 K, giving it a whitish-yellow hue. HD 190422 is slightly metal deficient with a metallicity of [Fe/H] = −0.13 and it spins modestly with a projected rotational velocity of 15.6 km/s. The star is estimated to be 400 million years old, less than a tenth the age of the Sun.
