= Kappa Telescopii =

Star in the constellation Telescopium

Observation data Epoch J2000.0 Equinox J2000.0 (ICRS)
- Constellation: Telescopium
- Right ascension: 18^{h} 52^{m} 39.64405^{s}
- Declination: −52° 06′ 26.5372″
- Apparent magnitude (V): +5.20

Characteristics
- Evolutionary stage: red clump
- Spectral type: G8/K0 III
- B−V color index: +0.96

Astrometry
Radial velocity (R_{v})	−44.3 km/s
Proper motion (μ)	RA: +39.92 mas/yr Dec.: −96.17 mas/yr
Parallax (π)	12.00±0.27 mas
Distance	272 ± 6 ly (83 ± 2 pc)
Absolute magnitude (M_{V})	+0.41±0.14

Details
Mass	1.92 M_{☉}
Radius	10.51 R_{☉}
Luminosity	77.6 L_{☉}
Surface gravity (log g)	2.79 cgs
Temperature	4,968 K
Metallicity [Fe/H]	−0.25 dex
Rotational velocity (v sin i)	2.63 km/s
Age	1.25 Gyr

Other designations
- κ Tel, CPD−52°11268, FK5 3499, HD 174295, HIP 92646, HR 7087, SAO 245772

Database references
SIMBAD	data

Kappa Telescopii (κ Telescopii) is a solitary, yellow-hued star in the southern constellation of Telescopium. With an apparent visual magnitude of +5.20, it is visible to the naked eye. Based upon an annual parallax shift of 12.00 mas as seen from Earth, it is located around 272 light years from the Sun.

At the age of around 1.25 billion years, this an evolved giant star with a stellar classification of G8/K0 III, showing a spectrum with characteristics intermediate between a G-type and a K-type star. It has an estimated 1.9 times the mass of the Sun and 10.5 times the Sun's radius. The star is radiating 77.6 times the solar luminosity from its photosphere at an effective temperature of 4,968 K. It is unclear whether it is cooling or heating up on its evolutionary pathway through the red clump.
