= V1794 Cygni =

FK Comae Berenices variable in the constellation Cygnus

Observation data Epoch J2000.0 Equinox ICRS
- Constellation: Cygnus
- Right ascension: 20^{h} 53^{m} 53.652^{s}
- Declination: +44° 23′ 11.08″
- Apparent magnitude (V): 7.23

Characteristics
- Evolutionary stage: Hertzsprung gap
- Spectral type: G7III-IVne
- B−V color index: 0.785±0.015
- Variable type: FK Com

Astrometry
| Radial velocity (R_{v}) | −30.76±0.33 km/s |
| Proper motion (μ) | RA: 26.451 mas/yr Dec.: −0.877 mas/yr |
| Parallax (π) | 8.8912±0.0147 mas |
| Distance | 366.8 ± 0.6 ly (112.5 ± 0.2 pc) |
| Absolute magnitude (M_{V}) | 2.21 |

Details
| Mass | 1.65 M_{☉} |
| Radius | 6.1 R_{☉} |
| Luminosity | 12.9 L_{☉} |
| Temperature | 5,180±92 K |
| Rotation | 3.32 d |
| Rotational velocity (v sin i) | 84.3±4.5 km/s |
| Age | 2.014 Gyr |

Other designations
- V1794 Cyg, BD+43°3759, GC 29168, HD 199178, HIP 103144, SAO 50198

Database references
| SIMBAD | data |

V1794 Cygni is a single variable star in the northern constellation Cygnus. It has the identifier HD 199178 from the Henry Draper Catalogue; V1794 Cygni is its variable star designation. With an apparent visual magnitude of 7.24, it's too dim to be visible with the naked eye but can be seen with binoculars. V1794 is located at a distance of 367 light-years (113 pc) based on parallax measurements, but is drifting closer to the Sun with a radial velocity of −31 km/s. It lies superimposed over a region of faint nebulosity to the west of the North America Nebula.

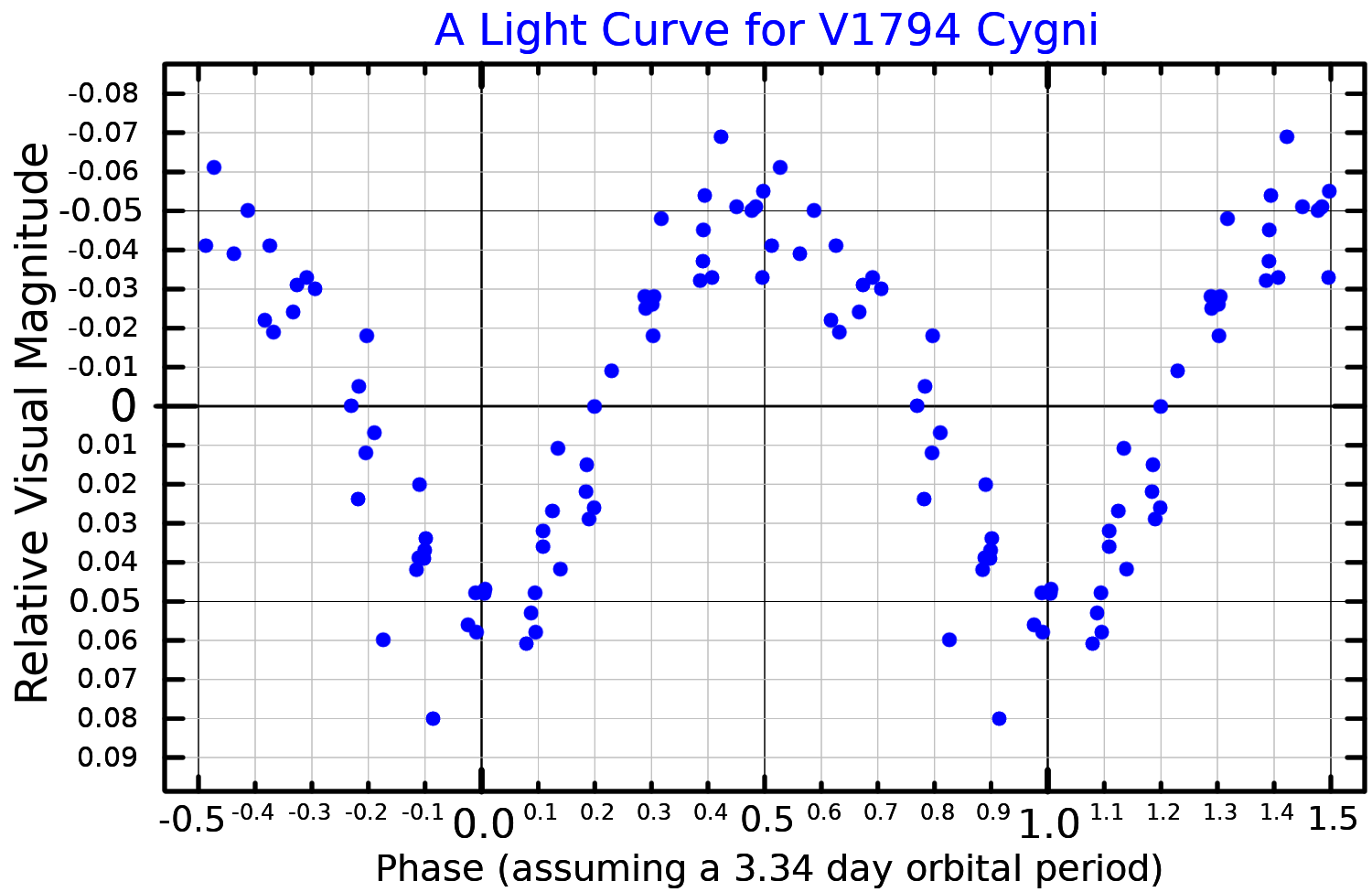
A visual band light curve for V1794 Cygni, adapted from Strassmeier et al. (1999)

Spectrographs of HD 199178 taken in 1926 showed unusually diffuse lines for a star of its type. In 1981, a broad, variable emission of Hydrogen alpha was noted, and the star showed a photometric variability with a period a few days. It showed extreme rotational broadening of the absorption lines but no variation in radial velocity. The existence of a class of single, cool, rapidly rotating giant stars such as FK Com and HD 199178 presented a puzzle for astronomers. The star showed a variable polarization with a period of four days, suggesting chromospheric activity with an asymmetric distribution of star spots and faculae, modulated by rotation. Photometric measurements established a rotation period of 3.337 days by 1983.

V1794 Cygni was classified as a Herbig Ae/Be star in 1999 in a catalog of UX Orionis stars. However, this proved incorrect because of the star's its fast rotation compared to other giants and it is now classified as a FK Comae Berenices variable. The stellar classification of V1794 Cygni is G7III-IVne, matching an evolved subgiant/giant star with emission lines (e) plus "nebulous" lines (n) due to rapid rotation. It is currently crossing the Hertzsprung gap, which indicates it has ceased core hydrogen burning.

This star has 165% of the mass and 6.1 times the radius of the Sun, but, with an age of around 2 billion years is younger than the latter. It is spinning with a projected rotational velocity of 84 km/s. V1794 Cygni is radiating 13 times the luminosity of the Sun from its enlarged photosphere at an effective temperature of 5,180 K, which gives it a yellow hue. For a giant star it has an exceptionally high X-ray emission, which suggests there is a high surface density of active regions.
