= DY Persei =

Variable carbon star in the constellation Perseus

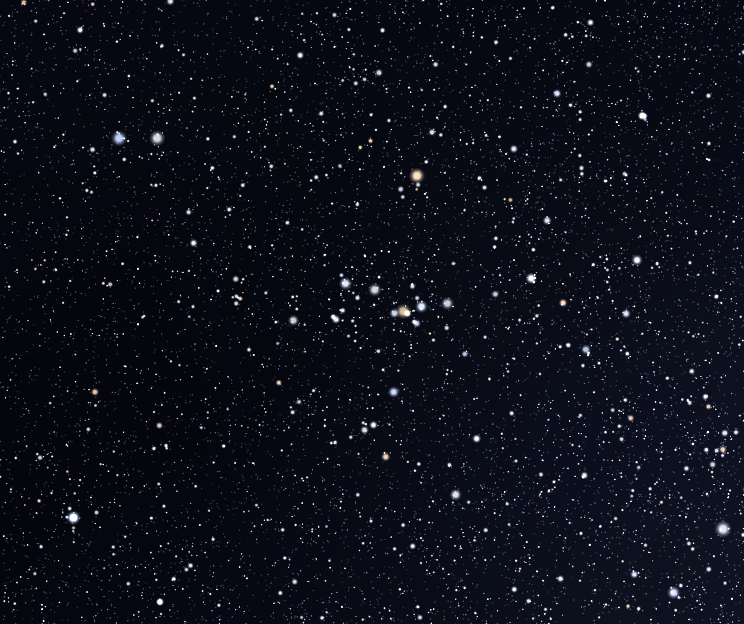
- Location of DY Persei (circled) near Trumpler 2 (Stellarium-generated image)

Observation data Epoch J2000.0 Equinox ICRS
- Constellation: Perseus
- Right ascension: 02^{h} 35^{m} 17.127^{s}
- Declination: +56° 08′ 44.72″
- Apparent magnitude (V): 10.5 - 16.0

Characteristics
- Spectral type: C5,4pJ: C-R4+ C_{2}5.5
- B−V color index: 1.79
- V−R color index: 1.12
- J−H color index: 0.185
- J−K color index: 1.963
- Variable type: DY Per

Astrometry
Radial velocity (R_{v})	−38 km/s
Proper motion (μ)	RA: +2.264 mas/yr Dec.: −0.675 mas/yr
Parallax (π)	0.6718±0.0251 mas
Distance	1,500 pc
Absolute magnitude (M_{V})	−2.5 (max)

Details
Radius	87 R_{☉}
Luminosity	522 L_{☉}
Surface gravity (log g)	0.0 cgs
Temperature	2,900-3,100 K
Metallicity [Fe/H]	−2.0 to −0.5 dex

Other designations
- DY Persei, DY Per, 2MASS J02351713+5608446, AAVSO 0228+55, IRAS 02316+5555, TYC 3691-1782-1

Database references
SIMBAD	data

DY Persei is a variable star and carbon star in the constellation Perseus. At maximum it is 11th magnitude and at its faintest it drops to 16th magnitude. DY Persei is the prototype of the very rare DY Persei class of variables that pulsate like red variables but also fade from sight like R Coronae Borealis variables.

== Location ==
DY Persei is located on the outskirts of the Trumpler 2 open cluster, near the famous Double Cluster. At 1,500 pc, DY Persei is thought to be much further away than Trumpler 2 and not a member.

== Variability ==
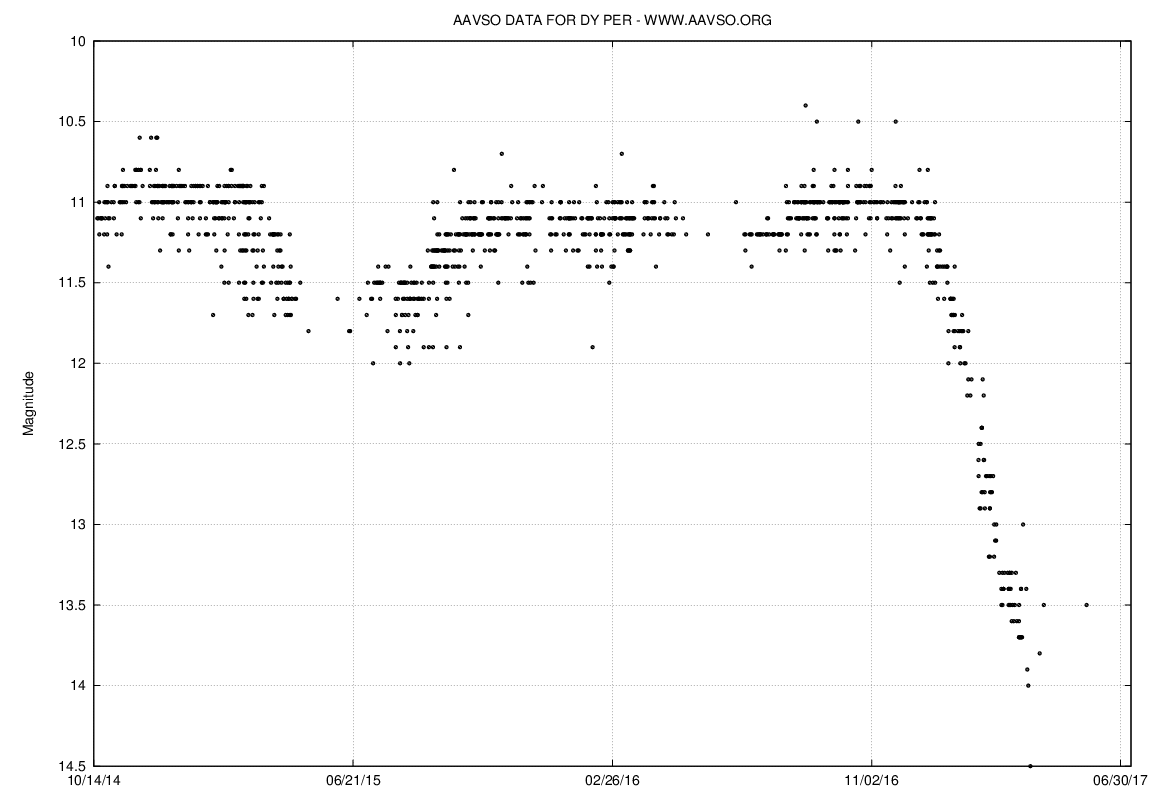
Light curve of DY Persei from 2014 to 2017, showing pulsations interrupted by a deep decline

DY Persei was reported to be variable in 1947. It was initially classified as a semiregular variable star with a brightness range of magnitude 10.6 to 13.2 and an approximate period of 900 days. Further study revealed that it showed deep declines every few years as well as continuous variations with a rough period of 792 days. The deep declines were considered to be related to the declines seen in R CrB stars, but DY Persei was a unique example, being a cool carbon star and showing large amplitude semiregular variations when not in decline.

DY Persei is now classed as a member of the very rare class of DY Persei variables, with only four known in the Milky Way and 13 more in the Magellanic Clouds. It has shown declines as deep as visual magnitude 16.0.

The deep declines of DY Persei occur much more regularly than those of most R CrB stars, and they are generally symmetrical with slower decline and recovery rates than other R CrB stars. It is unclear whether it is really a member of the class or a pulsating asymptotic giant branch star with unrelated veiling ejections, or just the cooler version of R CrB stars.

== Companion ==
There is a 14th magnitude star 2.5" from DY Persei, but it appears to be a chance alignment. It was not generally recognised until 2005, and would have strongly affected observations when DY Per was below maximum light. The companion is likely to be a G5 main sequence star much further away than DY Per. It had been reported that the colour of DY Persei became more blue during a deep decline, highly unexpected for a star of this type, but this has been explained as the relatively increased contribution to the light from the companion as DY Persei itself becomes fainter.

== Spectrum ==
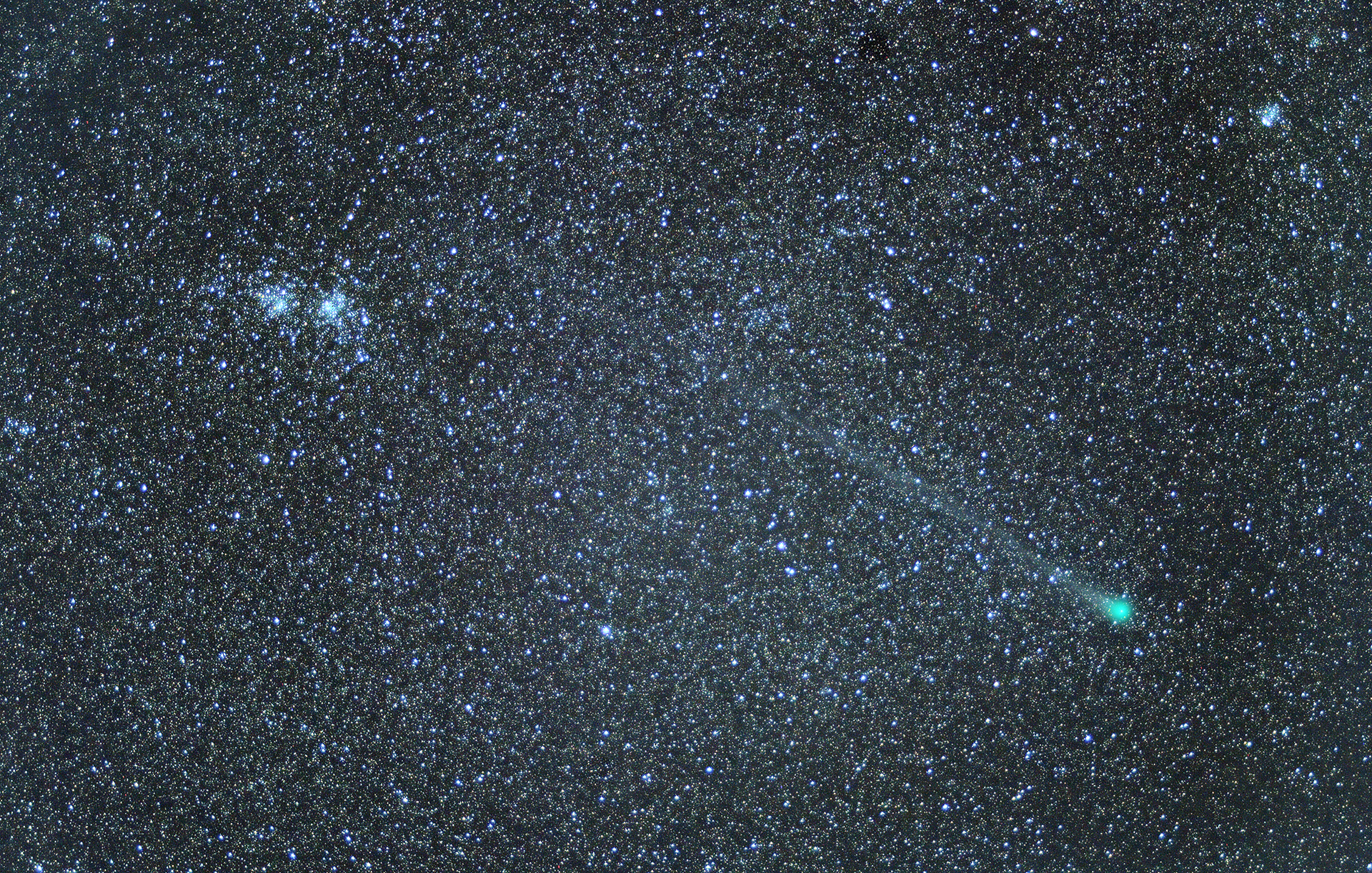
Image of the northwest corner of Perseus showing Comet Lovejoy and the Double Cluster. Trumpler 2 is on the left edge and DY Persei is visible as a faint red star nearby. (Juan lacruz)

DY Persei is a carbon star, with an excess of carbon relative to oxygen in its atmosphere. This causes dramatic changes in the atmospheric chemistry that are visible in the spectrum.

The spectral type under the original M-K carbon star system is C5,4pJ: (C5_{4}pJ:). This means that the spectrum overall is comparable to a late K or early M class, with strong C_{2} Swan bands. The "p" indicates that there are peculiarities and the "J" that there are isotopic bands from ^{13}C. In the revised M-K system, the spectral type is C-R4+ C_{2}5.5. This describes essentially the same spectral features, although the C-R type indicates that the isotopic bands are strong but not sufficiently so to merit a "J". The exact ^{13}C/^{12}C ratio for DY Persei is disputed. S-process metal spectral lines are weak compared to other carbon stars, suggesting that DY Persei is not a thermally-pulsing asymptotic giant branch star. Overall, hydrogen spectral features are weak and metal lines typical, showing that DY Persei is hydrogen-deficient but not metal-poor.

During deep minima, the carbon-related spectral bands become less prominent, and some emission lines are seen. In typical R CrB variables, the spectra at minimum show many strong emission lines of metals, but in DY Persei only a few are detected. A broad emission line of neutral sodium is seen, together with possible emission from neutral calcium and carbon.

== Properties ==
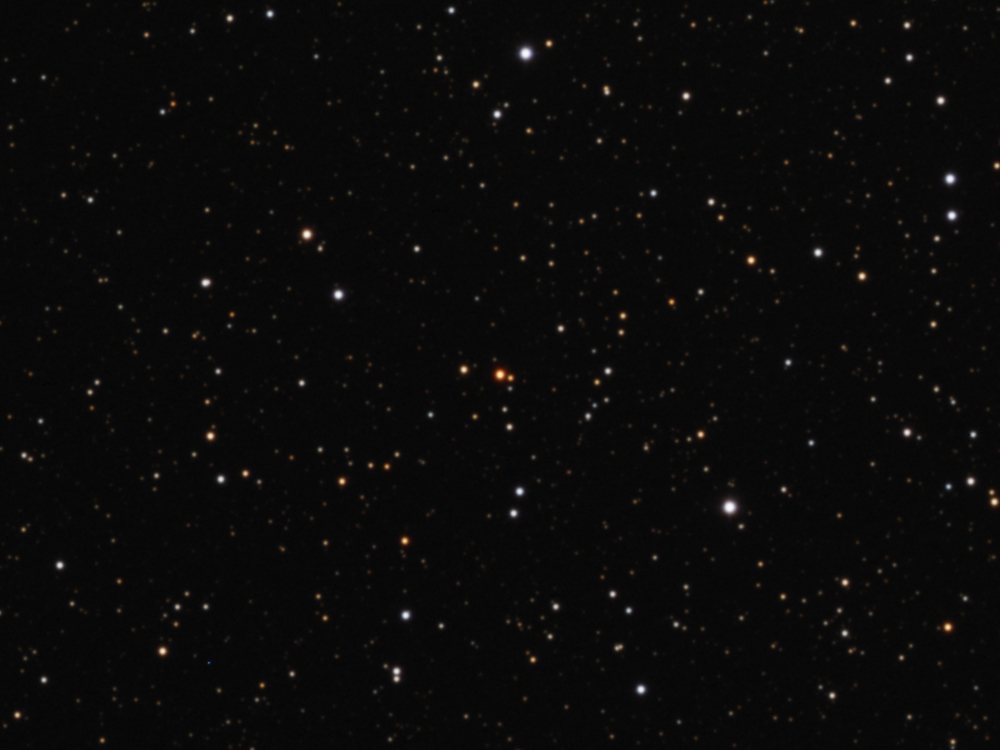
DY Persei is the larger of the two red stars in the center of this optical light image.

DY Persei has a temperature around 3,000 K, but at a deep minimum its spectrum has been best modelled as the sum of two black body objects, one of 1,700 K typical of dusty circumstellar material and one of 2,400 K typical of the coolest giant stars.

The size and luminosity of DY Persei, and other DY Persei and R Coronae Borealis stars, are very poorly known. The absolute magnitude is thought to be around −2.5, about 855 times brighter than the sun.

The metallicity of DY Persei has been reported to be much lower than solar, but other studies consider it to be near-solar.
