= RW Aurigae =

Young binary star system in the constellation Auriga

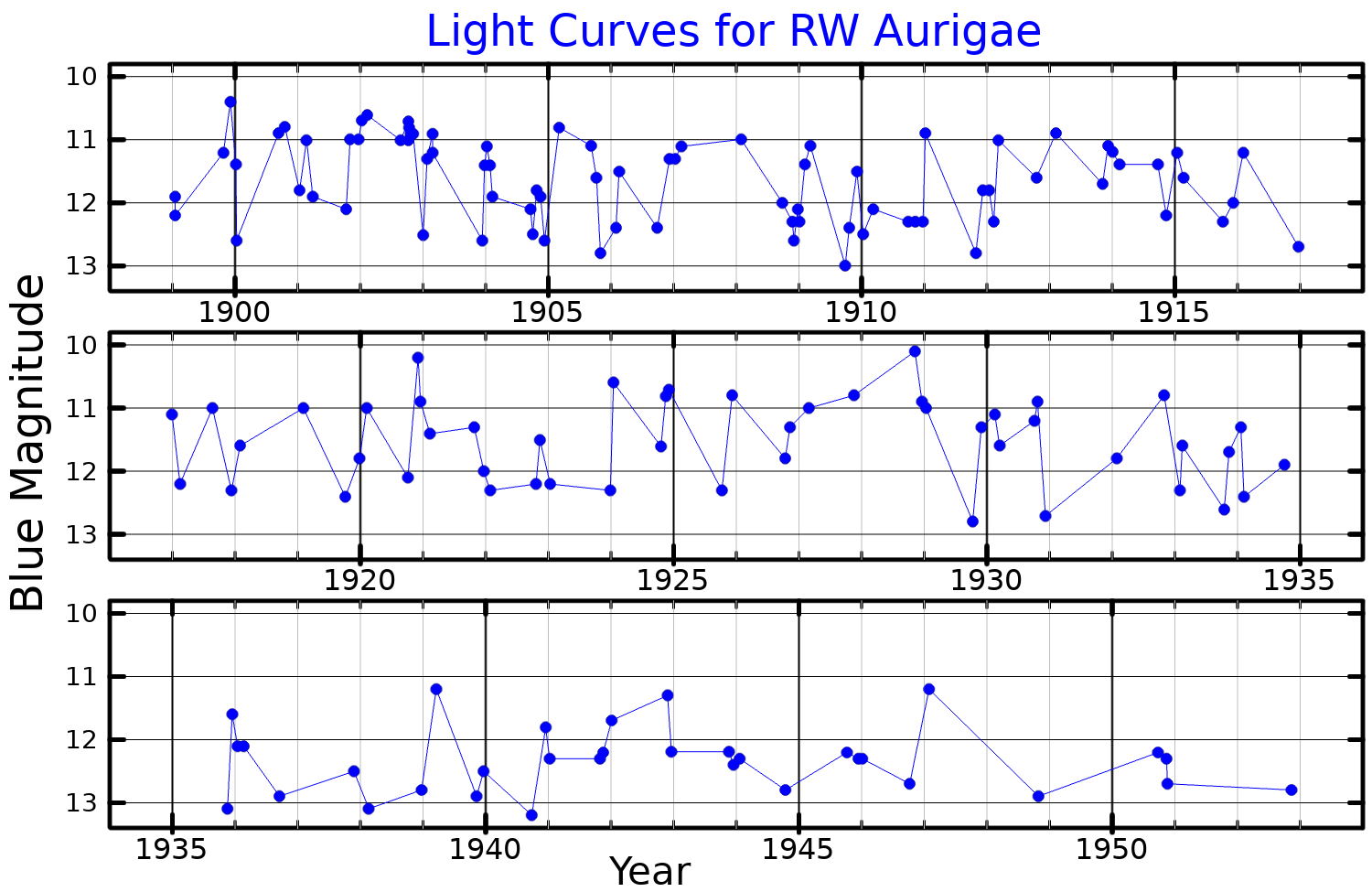
- Light curves for RW Aurigae derived from photographic plate data, adapted from Beck and Simon (2007)

Observation data Epoch J2000 Equinox ICRS
- Constellation: Auriga
- RW Aurigae A
- Right ascension: 05^{h} 07^{m} 49.4562^{s}
- Declination: +30° 24′ 04.774″
- Apparent magnitude (V): 9.6
- RW Aurigae B
- Right ascension: 05^{h} 07^{m} 49.5646^{s}
- Declination: +30° 24′ 05.131″

Characteristics

RW Aurigae A
- Spectral type: K1-K3
- Apparent magnitude (G): 12.1841±0.0086
- Variable type: T Tau

RW Aurigae B
- Spectral type: K5
- Apparent magnitude (G): 13.3051±0.0622

Astrometry

A
Radial velocity (R_{v})	−20.94±4.03 km/s
Proper motion (μ)	RA: +2.641±0.049 mas/yr Dec.: −27.398±0.036 mas/yr
Parallax (π)	6.4062±0.0441 mas
Distance	509 ± 4 ly (156 ± 1 pc)

B
Proper motion (μ)	RA: +4.906±0.329 mas/yr Dec.: −24.578±0.255 mas/yr
Parallax (π)	5.4541±0.3324 mas
Distance	600 ± 40 ly (180 ± 10 pc)

Position (relative to RW Aurigae A)
Component	RW Aurigae B
Epoch of observation	4/6/2007
Angular distance	1.448±0.005″
Position angle	255.9±0.3°
Projected separation	237 AU

Details

A
Mass	1.34±0.18 M_{☉}
Luminosity	0.59 L_{☉}
Temperature	5082 K
Rotation	5.6 d.
Age	3±1 Myr

B
Mass	0.9 M_{☉}
Radius	1.5 R_{☉}
Luminosity	0.6 L_{☉}
Temperature	4150±50 K
Age	3±1 Myr

Other designations
- BD+30 792, HD 240764, HIP 23873, TYC 2389-955-1, GSC 02389-00955, 2MASS J05074953+3024050
- RW Aurigae A: Gaia DR2 156430822114424576, Gaia DR3 156430822114424576
- RW Aurigae B: Gaia DR2 156430817820015232, Gaia DR3 156430817820015232

Database references
SIMBAD	data
- A
- B

RW Aurigae is a young binary system in the constellation of Auriga about 530 light years away, belonging to the Taurus-Auriga association of the Taurus Molecular Cloud. RW Aurigae B was discovered in 1944.

== System ==
The two stars of the RW Aurigae system are separated by 1.448″, equivalent to 237 AU at the distance of RW Aurigae. The primary is a pre-main sequence star with a mass of 1.4 M_{☉}, while the secondary has a mass of 0.9 M_{☉}. These are loosely bound, and their orbital trajectory is nearly parabolic, with an orbital period of 1000−1500 years as evidenced by the structure of the ejected dust jets. The star system's orbit is retrograde compared to the rotation direction of the disk orbiting the primary star. RW Aurigae A is also suspected to be a close binary since 1999.

== Properties ==
Both members of the binary are medium-mass objects still contracting towards the main sequence and accreting mass, RW Aurigae A at the rate of 0.1 M_{☉}/Myr, and RW Aurigae B at the rate of 0.005 M_{☉}/Myr. Their ages are equal to 3±1 million years.

The binary is surrounded by a complex accretion structure, containing a circumbinary shell, spiral arms, bow shocks and protoplanetary disks. RW Aur A is producing complex bipolar jets extending as far as 46 thousand AU from the star. Its protoplanetary disk is inclined to the line of sight by 45-60 degrees. It is not known if planetary formation in the disk has been arrested by stellar encounter or accelerated, as a wide range of debris sizes, consistent with both a collision cascade and ongoing planetesimal formation were detected. However, new work published in the 2018 - 2022 time period has shown strong evidence for the stochastic destruction of a large asteroid (approx. Vesta sized) differentiated planetesimal's Fe (iron) core at the inner edge of RW Aur A's accretion disk and the funneling of this material into the protostar's atmosphere and outflow jets. This implies both the creation of large asteroid-like bodies in far-out, cooler regions of the accretion disk and their migration into its innermost regions where they undergo catastrophic high energy collisions.

== Variability ==
In 1906, Vitold Tserasky discovered that BD+30 792 is a variable star. It was subsequently given the variable star designation RW Aurigae. RW Aurigae A varies in brightness. It is a T Tauri variable, and a prototype for the eponymous class of RW Aurigae variables, exhibiting irregular dips in its light curve due to the rapidly changing geometry of the protoplanetary disk, disturbed by the periastron passage of RW Aurigae B. A previous periastron passage happened about 400 years ago. The long-lasting brightness dips in 2010-2011 and 2014-2016 reduced the star's brightness to magnitude 12.5, before recovering to visual magnitude 10.5-11.0 by August 2016. In February 2025 a new major dimming event started.

The companion star is itself a variable of UX Orionis type, exhibiting both chaotic variations of brightness and short (less than one day) brightness dips due to continuing accretion and the inhomogeneity of the protoplanetary disk.

== See also ==
- FU Tauri
