= Stellar corona =

Outermost layer of a star's atmosphere

During a total solar eclipse, the Sun's corona and prominences are visible to the naked eye.

In astronomy, a corona (pl.: coronas or coronae) is the outermost layer of a star's atmosphere. It is a region filled with relatively hot, tenuous plasma that is structured by the star's magnetic field.

Scientists have greater access to the solar corona than they do to other stellar coronae, since it is inside our solar system. This means that the coronae of other stars are still relatively poorly understood.

Corona (Latin for 'crown') is, in turn, derived from Ancient Greek κορώνη (korṓnē) 'garland, wreath'.

== X-ray coronae ==
Coronal stars are ubiquitous among the stars in the cool half of the Hertzsprung–Russell diagram. These coronae can be detected using X-ray telescopes. Some stellar coronae, particularly in young stars, are much more luminous than the Sun's. For example, FK Comae Berenices is the prototype for the FK Com class of variable star. These are giants of spectral types G and K with an unusually rapid rotation and signs of extreme activity. Their X-ray coronae are among the most luminous (L_{x} ≥ 10^{32} erg·s^{−1} or 10^{25}W) and the hottest known with dominant temperatures up to 40 MK.

The astronomical observations planned with the Einstein Observatory by Giuseppe Vaiana and his group showed that F-, G-, K- and M-stars have chromospheres and often coronae much like the Sun. The O-B stars, which do not have surface convection zones, have a strong X-ray emission. However these stars do not have coronae, but the outer stellar envelopes emit this radiation during shocks due to thermal instabilities in rapidly moving gas blobs. Also A-stars do not have convection zones but they do not emit at the UV and X-ray wavelengths. Thus they appear to have neither chromospheres nor coronae.

== See also ==
- Geocorona
- Supernova
- X-ray astronomy
- Solar corona
- Accretion disk corona
