= R Hydrae =

Variable star in the constellation Hydra

- Location of R Hydrae (circled)

Observation data Epoch J2000 Equinox ICRS
- Constellation: Hydra
- Right ascension: 13^{h} 29^{m} 42.7819^{s}
- Declination: −23° 16′ 52.775″
- Apparent magnitude (V): 3.5 to 10.9 (variable)

Characteristics
- Evolutionary stage: AGB
- Spectral type: M6e/M9e:
- B−V color index: 1.317±0.254
- Variable type: Mira (period 388.87 days)

Astrometry
Radial velocity (R_{v})	−10.0±0.6 km/s
Proper motion (μ)	RA: −53.79 mas/yr Dec.: +16.15 mas/yr
Parallax (π)	7.93±0.18 mas
Distance	411 ± 9 ly (126 ± 3 pc)
Absolute magnitude (M_{V})	+0.95

Details
Mass	4.44 to 4.63 M_{☉}
Radius	421 to 445 R_{☉}
Luminosity	10,000 L_{☉}
Temperature	2,500 K
Age	0.5–1.0 Gyr

Other designations
- R Hya, BD−22° 3601, HD 117287, HIP 65835, HR 5080, SAO 181695, WDS 13297-2317A

Database references
SIMBAD	data

R Hydrae, abbreviated R Hya, is a single star in the equatorial constellation of Hydra, about 2.7° to the east of Gamma Hydrae. It is a Mira-type variable that ranges in apparent visual magnitude from 3.5 down to 10.9 over a period of 389 days. At maximum brightness the star can be seen with the naked eye, while at minimum a telescope of at least 5 cm is needed. This star is located at a distance of approximately 410 light-years from the Sun but is drifting closer with a radial velocity of −10 km/s.

This is an aging red giant star with a stellar classification of M6e/M9e:, currently near the thermal-pulsing tip of the asymptotic giant branch. The 1998 detection of weak technicium (Tc) lines in the spectrum suggests the star has recently gone through a third dredge-up. However, a 2010 study failed to detect technicium in the atmosphere, indicating this oxygen-rich AGB star is Tc-poor. O. J. Eggen found the star is a likely member of the Hyades supergroup, which suggests an age of 500 million to one billion years and a mass double that of the Sun.

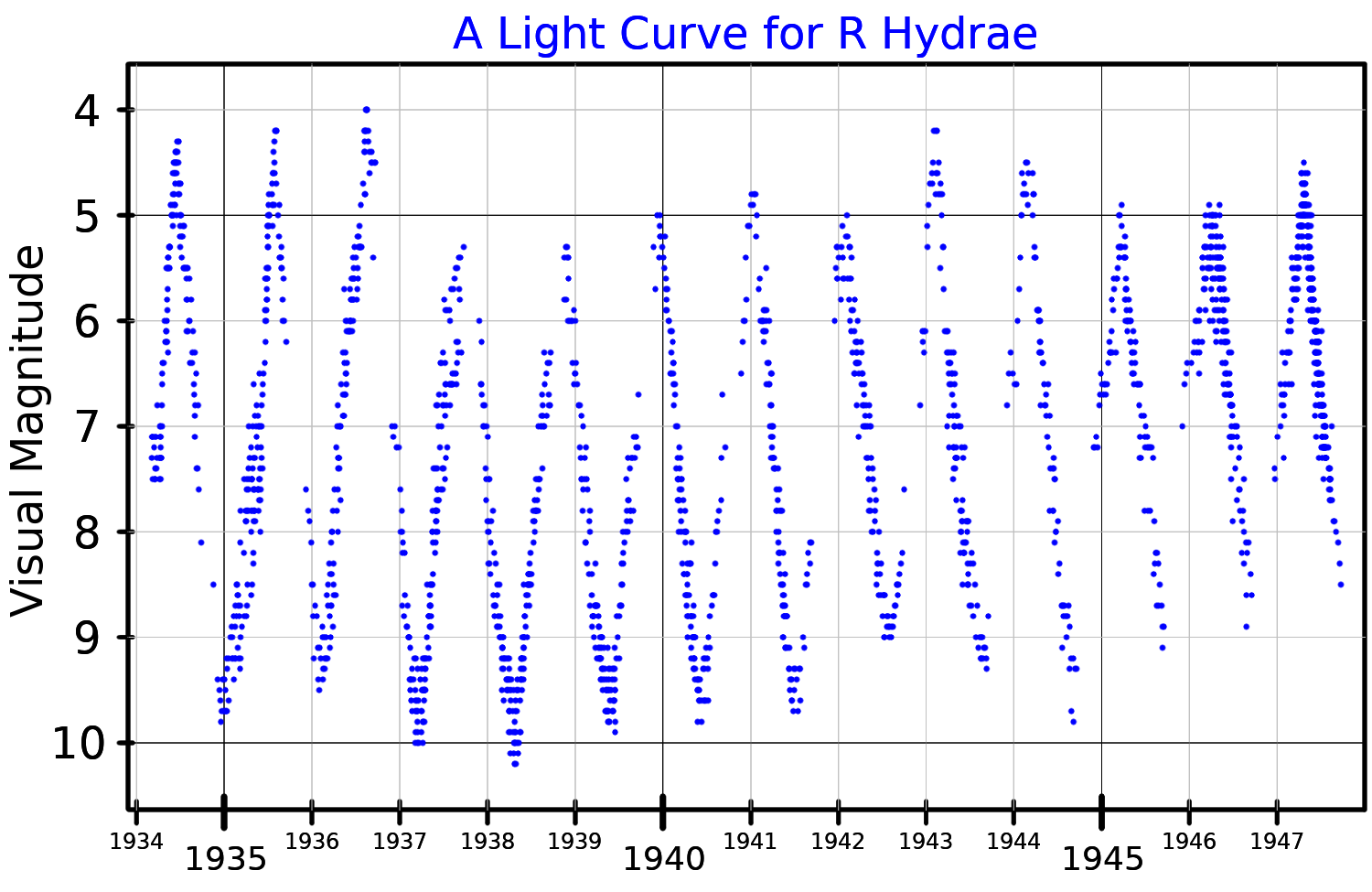
A visual band light curve for R Hydrae, from AAVSO data

The first record of observations for this star was in 1662 by Johannes Hevelius. It was found to be variable by Giacomo Filippo Maraldi in 1702; thereafter he tracked its various appearances until 1712. The evidence suggests the period of variability during this period was ~495 days. In between 1770 and 1950, the period declined linearly down to 385 days. It has remained fairly stable since that time. The decline may be due to a prior thermal pulse caused by a helium flash under a hydrogen-fusing shell. The period change would have been accompanied by a decrease in the stellar radius. An alternative explanation is a relaxation of the stellar envelope brought on by a change in the structure within the star.

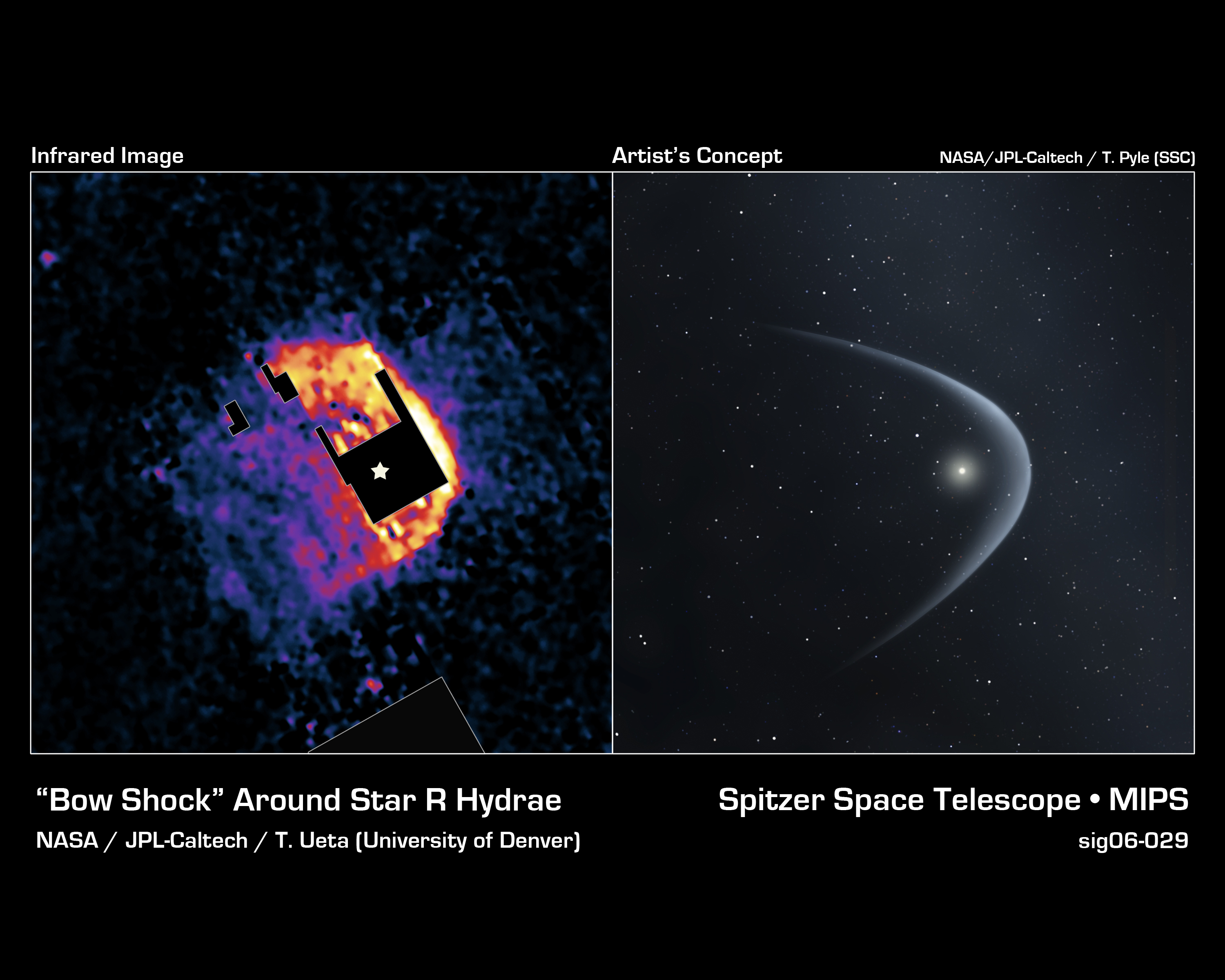
The bow shock around R Hya

An extended emission component has been detected in the infrared that indicates a detached, expanding dust shell surrounds the star. The inner boundary of this shell is located at 60–100 times the stellar radius, and it extends outward to at least 1,000 times the radius with an expansion velocity of ~8 km/s. The data indicate a mass loss rate of 2×10^{−7} M_{☉}·yr^{−1}, which declined by a factor of 20 around the year 1788. Observations using the Spitzer Space Telescope show an extended double shell with a spiral structure, which extends out to 300″. It forms a bow shock where it interacts with the surrounding interstellar medium. The orientation of this feature is consistent with the star's proper motion.
