= DY Persei variable =

Subclass of R Coronae Borealis variables

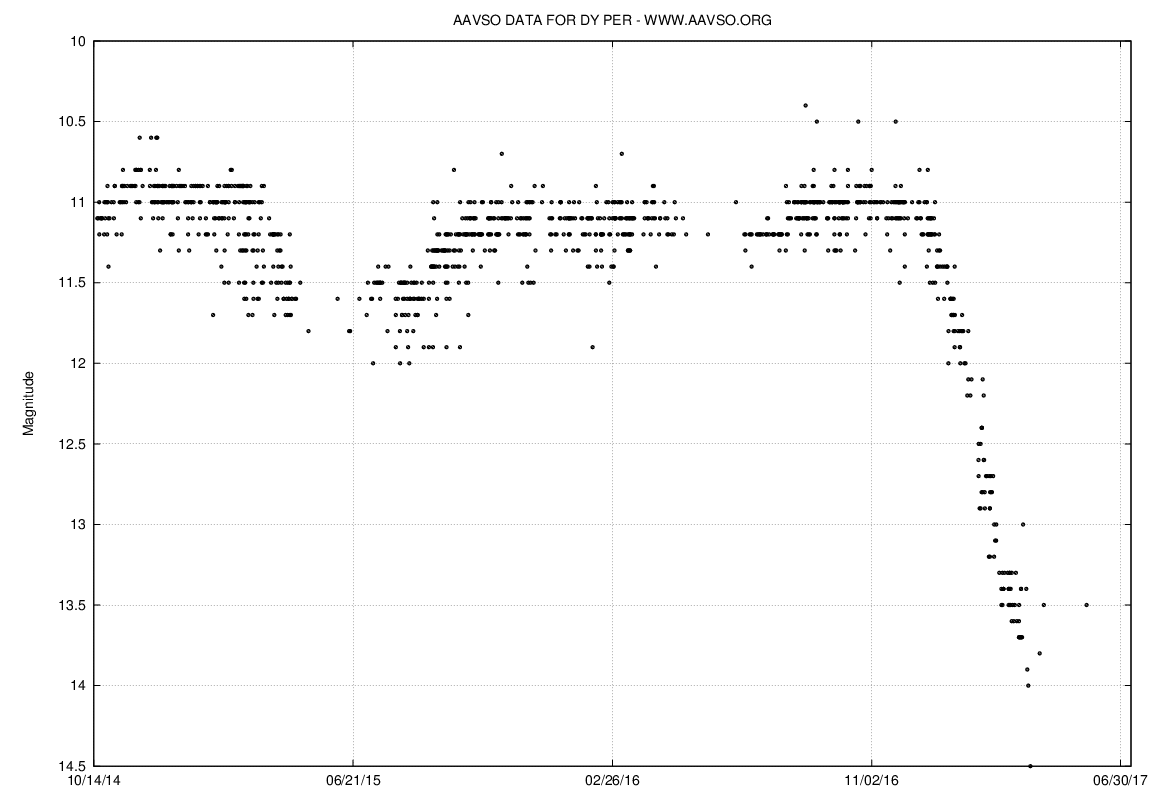
Light curve of DY Persei from 2014 to 2017, showing pulsations interrupted by a deep decline

DY Persei variables are a subclass of R Coronae Borealis (R CrB) variables. They are carbon-rich asymptotic giant branch (AGB) stars that exhibit pulsational variability of AGB stars and irregular fades similar to R CrB stars.

The star DY Persei is the prototype of this tiny class of variable stars. Only DY Persei itself was known in our galaxy until 2008 when systematic catalogue searches for R CrB variables discovered a 17th magnitude (at maximum) example. Since then automated searches have confirmed another four, including one of magnitude 6.9 at maximum. There are also several candidates that have not yet been observed to fade, and several DY Per stars in the Large Magellanic Cloud.

Although DY Persei variables have been considered a subset of the R CrB variables because of their irregular fades and carbon-rich spectra, they may simply be an unusual type of carbon star unrelated to the more massive and more luminous R CrB variables. The fades may be caused by obscuring ejection events rather than carbon condensation in the atmospheres of the stars.
