= NGC 957 =

Open cluster in the constellation Perseus

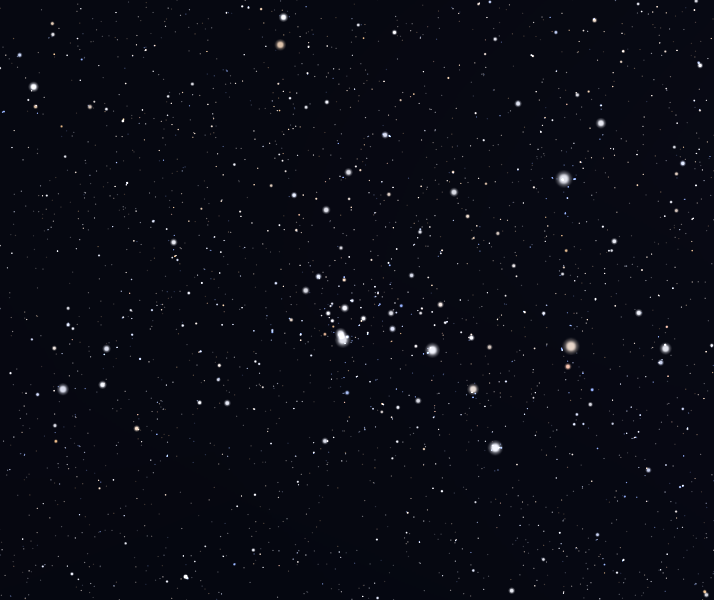
- Simulated image of NGC 957

Observation data (J2000.0 epoch)
- Right ascension: 02^{h} 33^{m} 21.0^{s}
- Declination: +57° 33′ 36″
- Distance: 5,920 ly (1,815 pc)
- Apparent magnitude (V): 7.6
- Apparent dimensions (V): 11'

Physical characteristics
- Other designations: Cr 28, OCL 362

Associations
- Constellation: Perseus

NGC 957 (also known as Collinder 28) is a loosely bound open cluster located in the constellation Perseus. It has an apparent magnitude of 7.6 and an approximate size of 11 arc-minutes. It is young at less than 11 million years old.

== Location ==
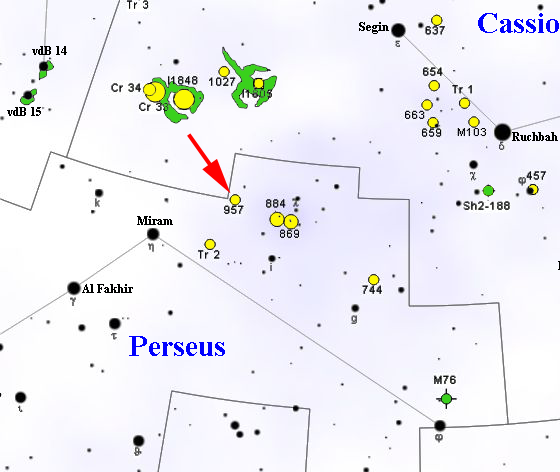
Location of NGC 957 in the night sky

NGC 957 lies in north of the celestial equator, and is therefore easier to be seen from the northern hemisphere.

NGC 957 lies 1.5º WNW of NGC 884, which itself is part of the larger Double Cluster. The stars Gamma Persei and Eta Persei point in the general direction of the open cluster.

== See also ==
- Trumpler 2 - a nearby open cluster
