= Trumpler 2 =

Open cluster in the constellation Perseus

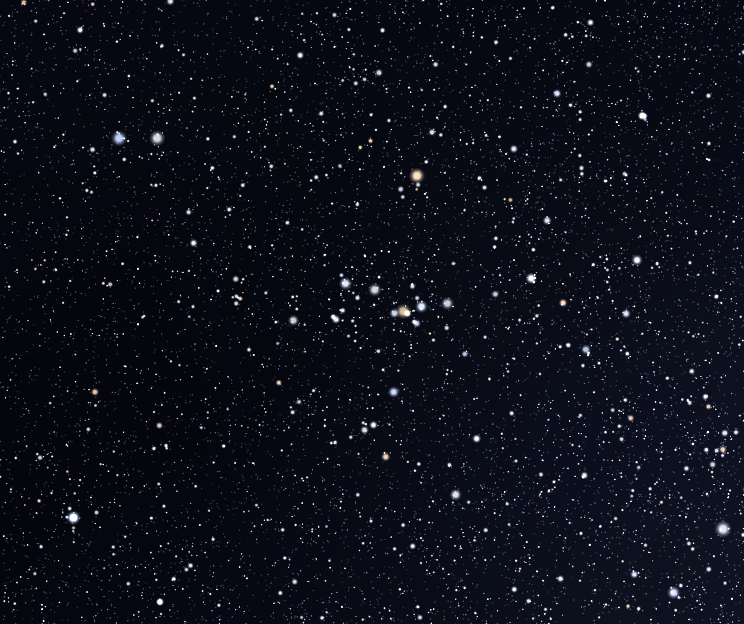
- Trumpler 2 as seen from the Stellarium Software

Observation data (J2000.0 epoch)
- Right ascension: 02^{h} 36^{m} 00^{s}
- Declination: +55° 50′ 00″
- Distance: 2,000
- Apparent magnitude (V): 5.9

Physical characteristics
- Other designations: Cr 29, C 0233+557

Associations
- Constellation: Perseus

Trumpler 2 is an open cluster located in the constellation Perseus. It is approximately 2000 light-years from Earth, placing its position within the Perseus Arm of the Milky Way Galaxy. Although at this large distance, it can be seen with the naked eye, at magnitude 6.

It has a central red star named HD 16068 of spectral type K3.5II-III, and is visually the brightest star of the cluster as seen from Earth.

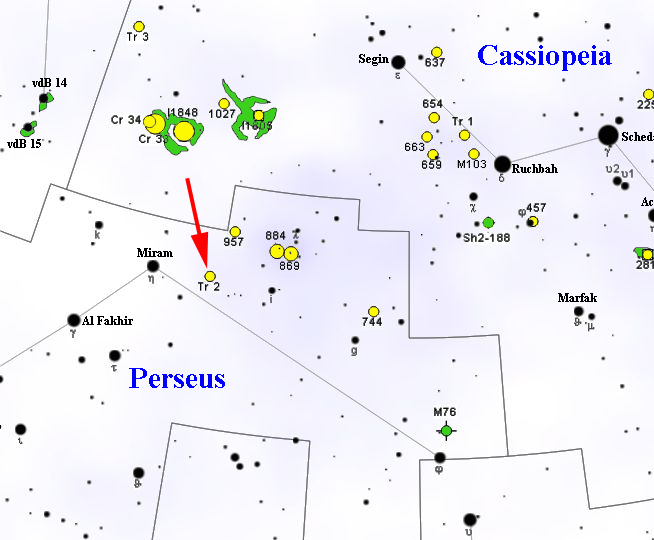
Trumpler 2's location in the constellation Perseus.

== See also ==
- NGC 957 - a nearby open cluster
