= FK Comae Berenices =

Star in the constellation of Coma Berenices

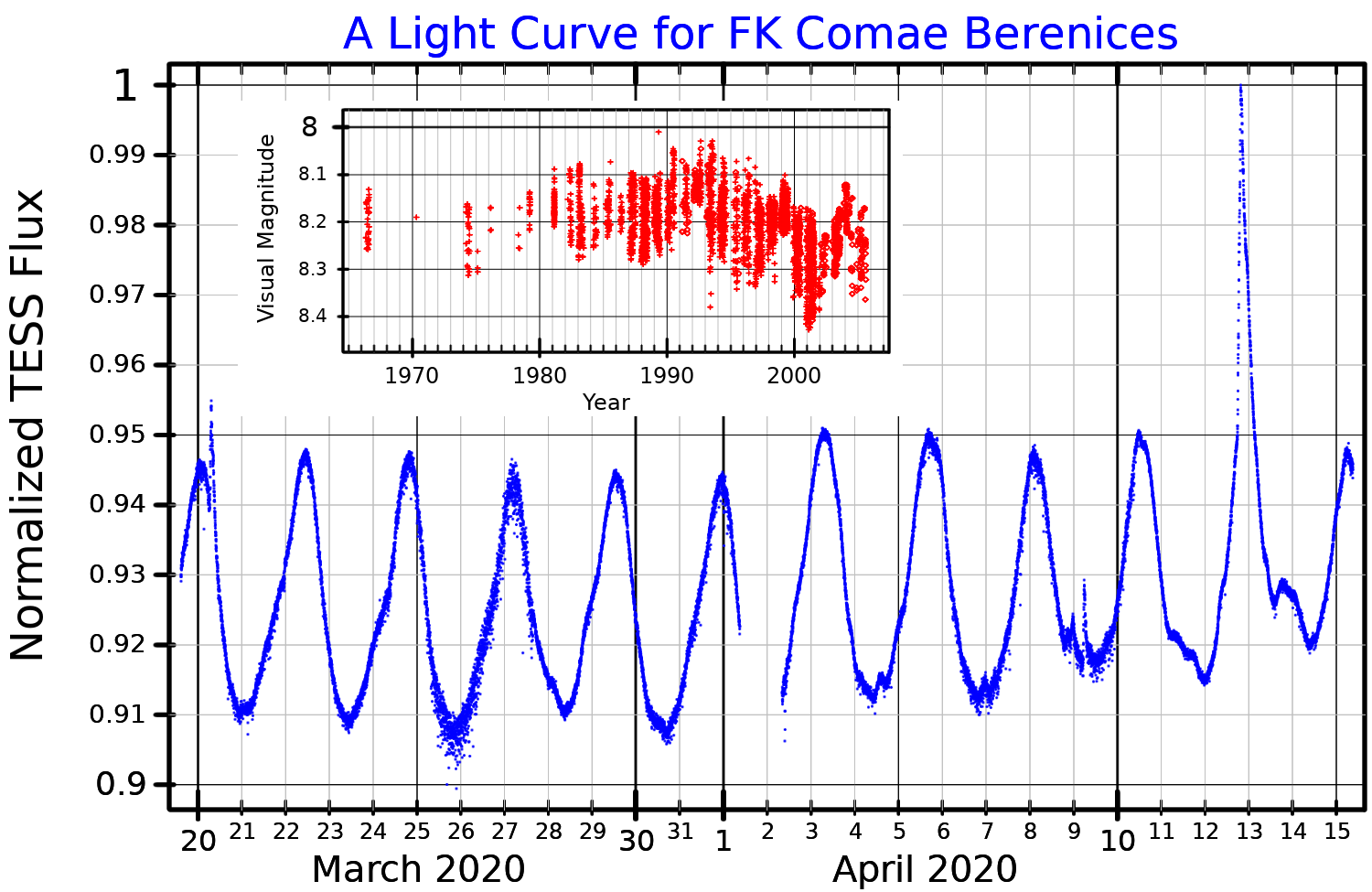
- Light curves for FK Comae Berenices. The main plot shows the short term variability plotted from TESS data; the inset, adapted from Panov and Dimitrov (2007), shows the long term variability.

Observation data Epoch J2000 Equinox ICRS
- Constellation: Coma Berenices
- Right ascension: 13^{h} 30^{m} 46.79937^{s}
- Declination: +24° 13′ 57.7862″
- Apparent magnitude (V): 8.14 – 8.33

Characteristics
- Evolutionary stage: red giant branch
- Spectral type: G4 III
- Variable type: FK Com

Astrometry
Radial velocity (R_{v})	−21.0±5.8 km/s
Proper motion (μ)	RA: −51.969 mas/yr Dec.: −22.262 mas/yr
Parallax (π)	4.6102±0.0446 mas
Distance	707 ± 7 ly (217 ± 2 pc)
Absolute magnitude (M_{V})	1.2

Details
Mass	1.1 M_{☉}
Radius	6.99 R_{☉}
Luminosity	26.8 L_{☉}
Surface gravity (log g)	2.359 cgs
Temperature	4,966 K
Metallicity [Fe/H]	−0.89 dex
Rotation	2.4 days
Rotational velocity (v sin i)	160 km/s

Other designations
- BD+24°2592, HD 117555, HIP 65915, SAO 82867

Database references
SIMBAD	data

FK Comae Berenices is a variable star that varies in apparent magnitude between 8.14 and 8.33 over a period of 2.4 days. In 1966, Pavel Fedorovich Chugainov discovered that the star, then called HD 117555, varied in brightness. It was given its variable star designation, FK Comae Berenices, in 1968. It is the prototype for the FK Comae Berenices (FK Com) class of variable stars. The variability of FK Com stars may be caused by large, cool spots on the rotating surfaces of the stars. This star is thought to be the result of a recent binary merger, resulting in a high rate of both spin and magnetic activity.

The spectral class of FK Comae Berenices is G4 III, although it is considered unusual in having very broad absorption lines as well as some emission lines. The broadened spectral lines are due to rapid rotation.

The rotation rate of FK Comae Berenices is unusually fast for a cool giant star. It is speculated that this is due to the merger of a contact binary pair of stars into a single star. The rotation produces extremely strong magnetic fields which are expected to brake the star to a slower rotation rate. Analysis of variability due to star spots on the surface show that the star rotates at different speeds at different latitudes.

FK Comae Berenices is listed as a companion to the slightly brighter HD 117567. The two are not thought to be physically associated, with HD 117567 being a much closer F2 main sequence star.
