= UX Orionis =

Variable star in the constellation Orion

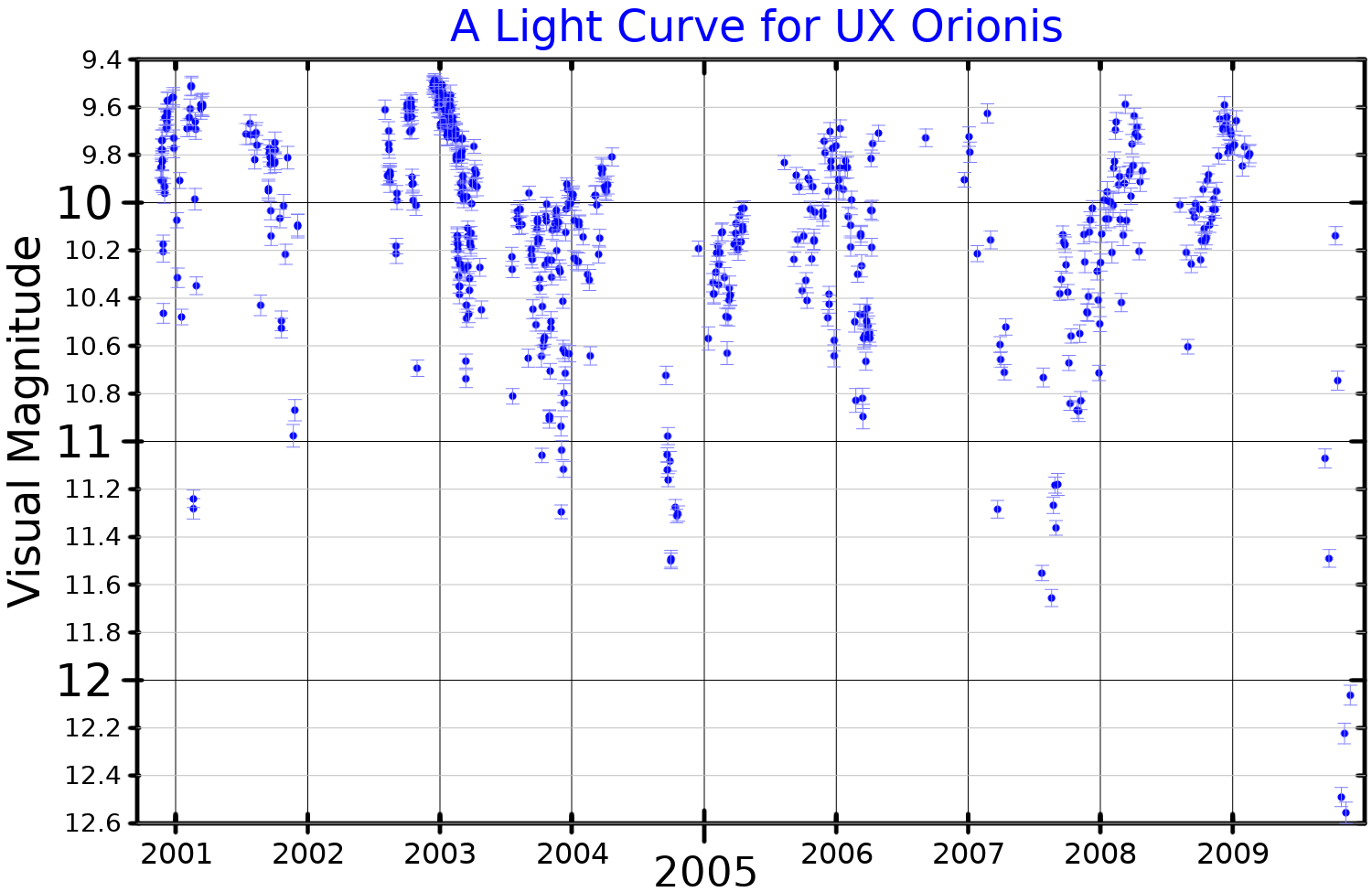
- A visual-band light curve for UX Orionis, plotted from ASAS data

Observation data Epoch J2000 Equinox ICRS
- Constellation: Orion
- Right ascension: 05^{h} 04^{m} 29.9879^{s}
- Declination: −03° 47′ 14.287″
- Apparent magnitude (V): 9.4 – 12.7

Characteristics
- Spectral type: A3ea
- Variable type: UX Ori

Astrometry
Proper motion (μ)	RA: 1.056±0.028 mas/yr Dec.: -3.998±0.019 mas/yr
Parallax (π)	3.1004±0.0285 mas
Distance	1,052 ± 10 ly (323 ± 3 pc)

Details
Mass	1.91+0.04 −0.00 M_{☉}
Radius	1.7 (Note: Calculated, using the Stefan-Boltzmann law and the star's effective temperature and luminosity, with respect to the solar nominal effective temperature of 5,772 K: $$\sqrt{\biggl(\frac{5,772}{8,500}\biggr)^4 \cdot 10^{1.12}} = 1.7\ R_\odot.$$) R_{☉}
Luminosity	13.2+5.0 −4.9 L_{☉}
Surface gravity (log g)	3.75±0.12 cgs
Temperature	8,500±250 K
Rotational velocity (v sin i)	143 km/s
Age	9.84+0.17 −0.00 Myr

Other designations
- HD 293782, HIP 23602, GSC 04758-00134, 2MASS J05042998-0347142, Gaia DR3 3212878018378138752

Database references
SIMBAD	data

UX Orionis is a variable star in the constellation of Orion. It is a Herbig Ae star, located about 1,000 light-years from Earth. At its brightest it is a magnitude 9.4 object, so it is too faint to be seen with the naked eye. UX Orionis is the prototype of the UX Orionis class of variable stars (often called "UXors"), which are young stellar objects that exhibit large (greater than 2.8 magnitude), irregular changes in visual-band brightness. UX Orionis was discovered by Henrietta Swan Leavitt.

UX Orionis is surrounded by a circumstellar disk, and the star's photometric variability appears to be caused by episodes during which the star is obscured by dusty material within the circumstellar disk.
