= Comet Peltier =

Comet Peltier, or Peltier's Comet, may refer to any of the ten comets discovered by American astronomer, Leslie C. Peltier, below:

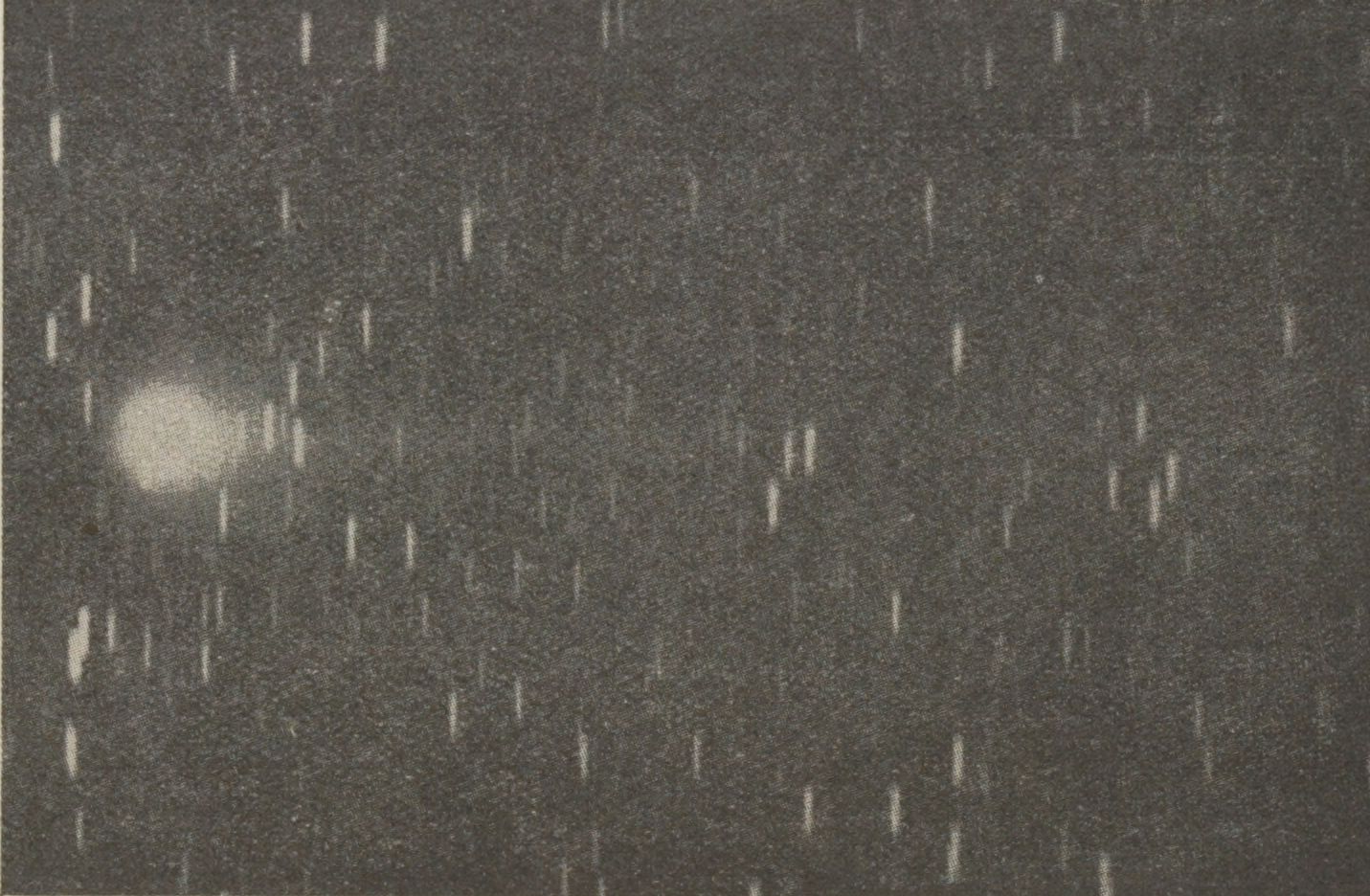
C/1925 V1 (Wilk–Peltier)

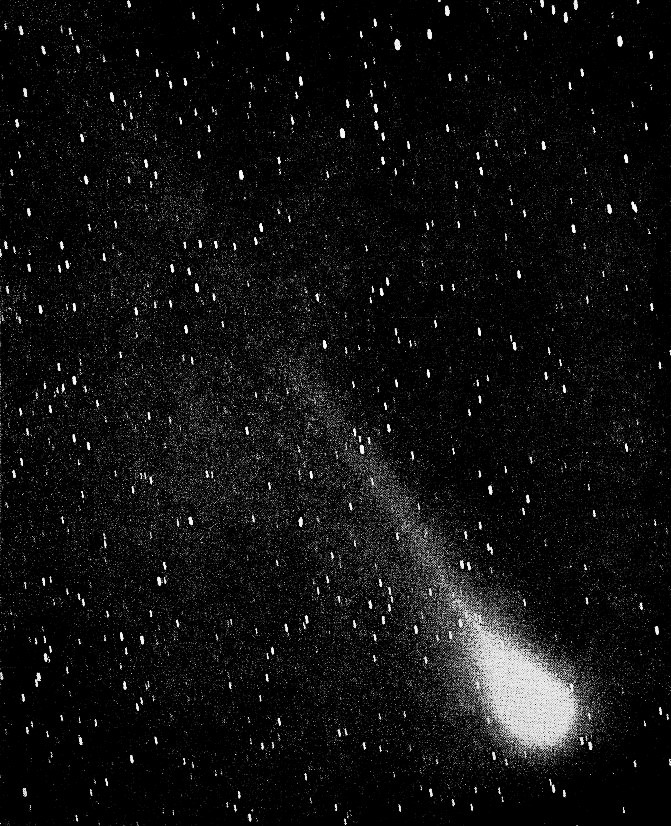
C/1936 K1 (Peltier)

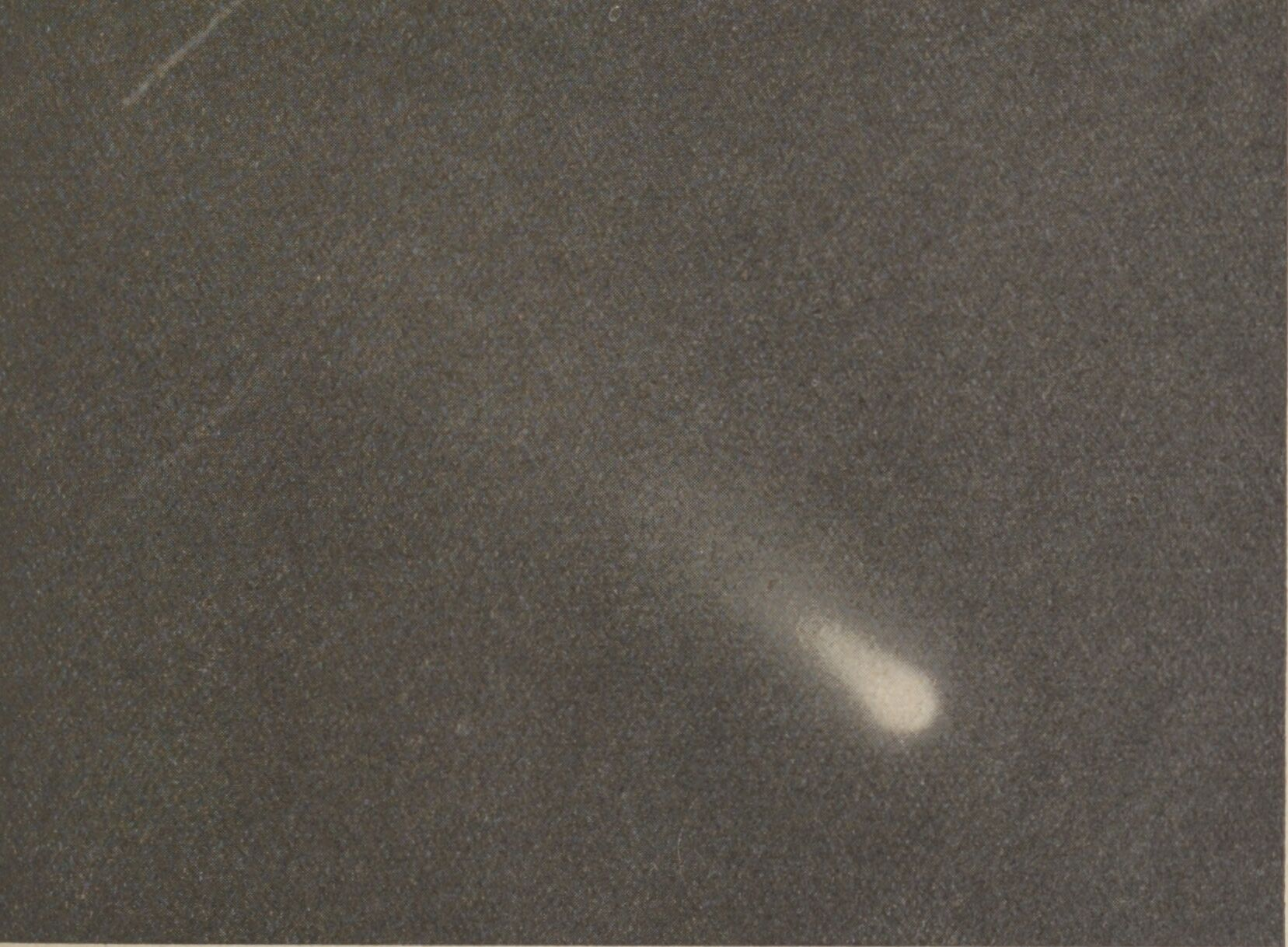
C/1939 B1 (Kozik–Peltier)

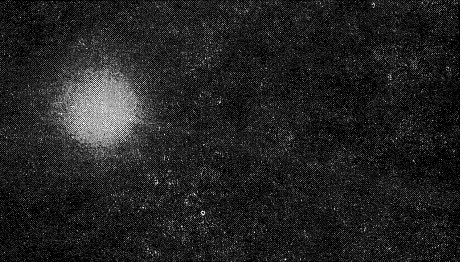
C/1943 W1 (van Gent–Peltier–Daimaca)

- C/1933 D1 (Peltier)
- C/1936 K1 (Peltier)
- C/1952 M1 (Peltier)

It may also be a partial reference to several comets he co-discovered with other astronomers:

- C/1925 V1 (Wilk–Peltier)
- C/1930 D1 (Peltier–Schwassmann–Wachmann)
- C/1932 P1 (Peltier–Whipple)
- C/1939 B1 (Kozik–Peltier)
- C/1943 W1 (van Gent–Peltier–Daimaca)
- C/1945 W1 (Friend–Peltier)
- C/1954 M2 (Kresák–Peltier)
