= Bredeick–Lang House =

Historic house in Ohio, United States

- U.S. National Register of Historic Places
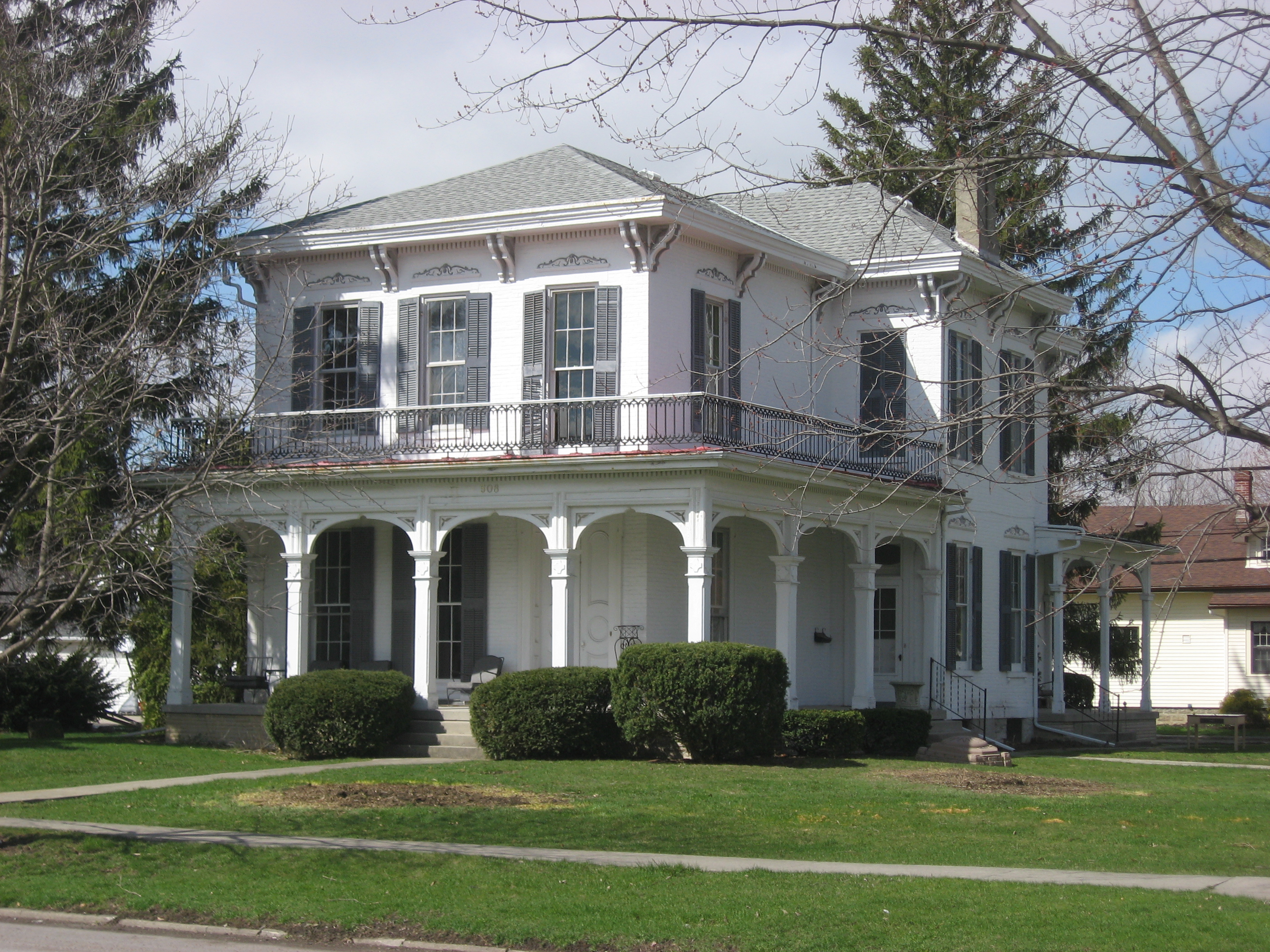
- Front and eastern side of the house

- Location within Ohio Location within the United States
- Location: 508 W. 2nd St., Delphos, Ohio
- Coordinates: 40°50′38″N 84°20′43″W
- Area: less than one acre
- Built: 1859
- Architectural style: Italian Villa
- NRHP reference No.: 82003663
- Added to NRHP: April 7, 1982

The Bredeick–Lang House (also known as the "James Lang House") is a historic house on the western (Van Wert County) side of Delphos, Ohio, United States. Built in 1859, it is one of western Ohio's best examples of the Italian Villa style of architecture. Members of the Bredeick family have been important throughout Delphos' history: brothers Ferdinand and John Otto Bredeick platted the community along the Miami and Erie Canal in 1845, naming the two sides "West Bredeick" and "East Bredeick" respectively. Few buildings from the city's earliest years have survived, making the Bredeick–Lang House one of the oldest extant buildings in Delphos as well as one of the most elegant. A brick building with iron elements, it has seen few changes since the time of its construction, thus retaining its mid-nineteenth-century appearance to the present time.

In 1982, the Bredeick–Lang House was listed on the National Register of Historic Places because of its well preserved historic architecture. Two other Delphos buildings – both of which lie on the Allen County side of the city – are listed on the National Register. Unlike the Bredeick–Lang House, neither of the other buildings features Italianate architecture: St. John's Catholic Church is a Romanesque Revival structure, while the Marks-Family House is a Queen Anne building.
