= HD 74180 =

Supergiant star in the constellation Vela

b Velorum
- Location of b Vel (circled)

Observation data Epoch J2000 Equinox ICRS
- Constellation: Vela
- Right ascension: 08^{h} 40^{m} 37.57121^{s}
- Declination: −46° 38′ 55.4644″
- Apparent magnitude (V): 3.81

Characteristics
- Evolutionary stage: Yellow supergiant or yellow hypergiant
- Spectral type: F0Ia or F0Ia^{+}
- U−B color index: +0.34
- B−V color index: +0.67
- Variable type: suspected α Cyg

Astrometry
Radial velocity (R_{v})	−25.3 km/s
Proper motion (μ)	RA: −6.124 mas/yr Dec.: +4.473 mas/yr
Parallax (π)	0.431±0.101 mas
Distance	5,400+110 −140 ly (1,657+33 −44 pc)
Absolute magnitude (M_{V})	−6.50

Details
Mass	21.4±2.3 M_{☉}
Radius	325±28 R_{☉}
Luminosity	316,000+73,000 −65,000 L_{☉}
Surface gravity (log g)	1.38 cgs
Temperature	7,839 K
Metallicity [Fe/H]	+0.56 dex
Rotational velocity (v sin i)	21.7±6 km/s
Age	7.4±0.8 Myr

Other designations
- b Velorum, HR 3445, HD 74180, CD−46°4438, FK5 1226, HIP 42570, SAO 220265

Database references
SIMBAD	data

HD 74180 (b Velorum) is a single star in the constellation Vela. It is a yellow-white F-type supergiant with a mean apparent magnitude of +3.81 and a spectral classification F8Ib.

== Properties ==
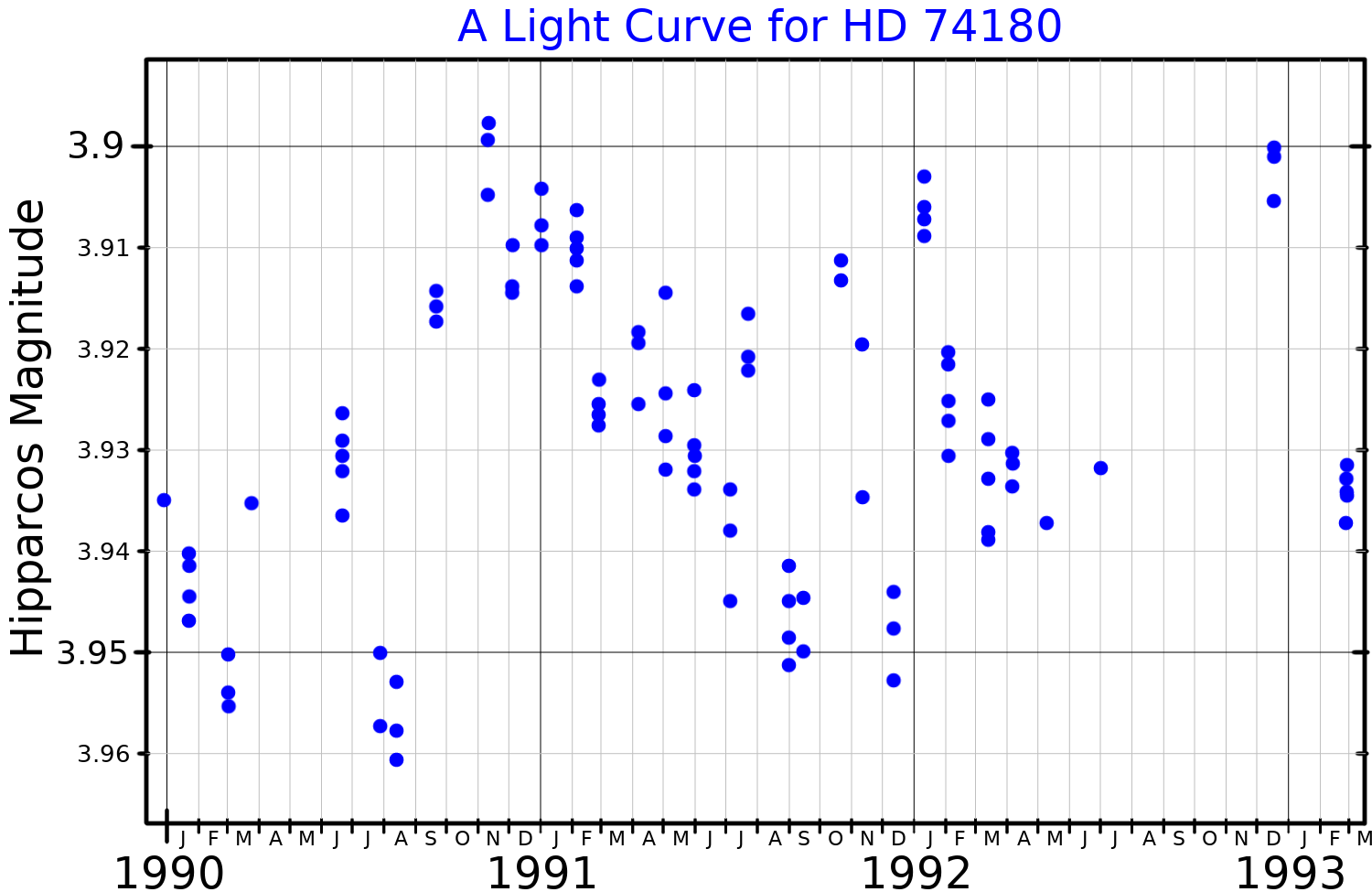
A light curve for HD 74180, adapted from van Leeuwen et al. (1998)

b Velorum has been classified as a suspected α Cygni variable star which varies by only 0.06 magnitude. There are possible periods near 53, 80, and 160 days, but the variation is largely irregular. It lies less than a degree from the small open cluster NGC 2645, but is not a member.

Several studies have considered b Velorum to be a highly luminous supergiant or hypergiant with an early F spectral type, for example F2 Ia^{+}, F0 Ia, and F4 I. There were corresponding luminosity estimates of several hundred thousand L_{☉}. Aidelman et al. (2015) used the Barbier-Chalonge-Divan (BCD) system to derive a luminosity of 34,000 L_{☉} and a cooler less luminous F8 Ib spectral type. Kasikov et al. (2026) arrived with a luminosity of 316,000 L_{☉} based on an stellar radius of 325±28 R_{☉} and an effective temperature of 7,540 K from the average of earlier spectroscopic measurements.

Parallax measurements by the Hipparcos and Gaia spacecraft imply distances of 1490±360 pc (4,860 ly) and 2,530+600
−397 pc (8,250 ly), respectively. Aidelman et al. (2015) give a distance of 990 pc (3,200 ly). Kasikov et al. (2026) estimated the distance using stars with similar proper motion and reliable Gaia parallaxes, giving a value of 1,657 parsecs (5,400 ly). This is consistent with the distance to NGC 2645, despite the star being not a member.

== In Chinese astronomy ==
In Chinese, 天社 (Tiān Shè), meaning Celestial Earth God's Temple, refers to an asterism consisting of Kappa Velorum, Gamma^{2} Velorum, b Velorum and Delta Velorum. Consequently, Kappa Velorum itself is known as 天社五 (Tiān Shè wǔ), "the Fifth Star of Celestial Earth God's Temple".
