= C/1939 B1 (Kozik–Peltier) =

Non-periodic comet

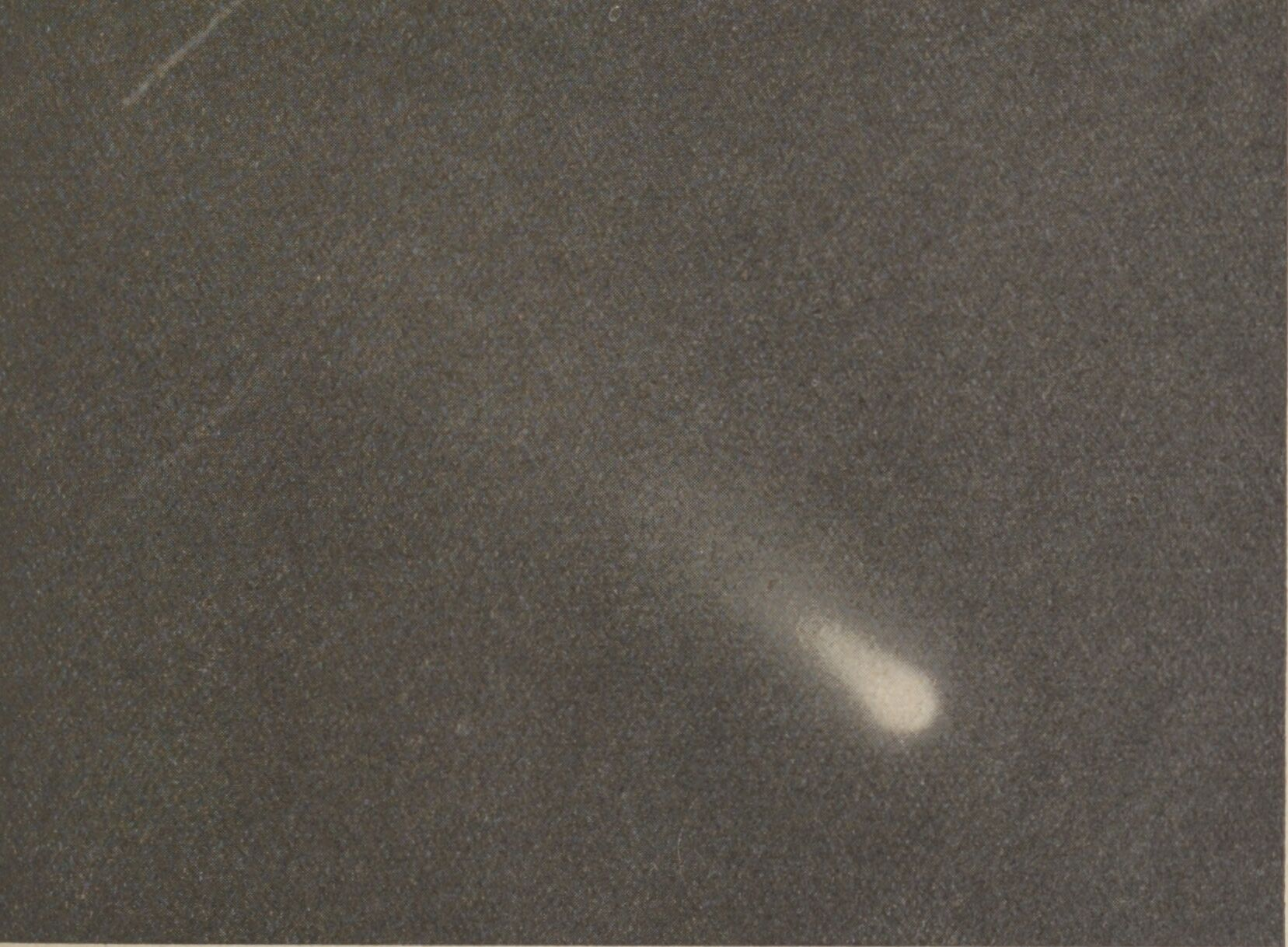
- Comet Kozik–Peltier photographed by Ferdinand Quénisset on 8 February 1939.

Discovery
- Discovered by: Stefan M. Kozik; Leslie C. Peltier
- Discovery site: Tashkent, Uzbek SSR; Delphos, Ohio, USA
- Discovery date: 17–20 January 1939

Designations
- Alternative designations: 1939 I, 1939a; Comet Cosik–Peltier

Orbital characteristics
- Observation arc: 30 days
- Number of observations: 53
- Aphelion: ~315 AU
- Perihelion: 0.716 AU
- Semi-major axis: ~160 AU
- Eccentricity: 0.99545
- Orbital period: ~1,980 years
- Inclination: 63.526°
- Longitude of ascending node: 289.61°
- Argument of periapsis: 169.02°
- Mean anomaly: 0.0006°
- Last perihelion: 6 February 1939
- T_{Jupiter}: 0.500
- Earth MOID: 0.259 AU
- Jupiter MOID: 2.588 AU

Physical characteristics
- Comet total magnitude (M1): 9.6
- Apparent magnitude: 5.7 (1939 apparition)

Comet Kozik–Peltier, formally designated as C/1939 B1, is a non-periodic comet that became barely visible to the naked eye in February 1939. It is the second comet discovered by Stefan M. Kozik and the sixth overall by Leslie C. Peltier.

== Observational history ==
=== Discovery ===
Stefan M. Kozik first discovered the comet on the night of 17 January 1939, where at the time it was a diffuse 8th-magnitude object within the constellation Cygnus. (Note: Reported initial position upon discovery was: α = 21^{h} 07.1^{m} , δ = 28° 20′) Sergey Belyavsky later confirmed the existence of Kozik's comet on 19 January, and he later sent an official announcement two days later, but not before Leslie C. Peltier independently discovered it on 20 January 1939. Yrjö Väisälä made additional observations on the same day as Peltier.

=== Follow-up observations ===
Several observatories later made follow-up observations of the comet throughout the remainder of January 1939. It made its closest approach to Earth at a distance of 0.551 AU (82.4 million km) on 11 February 1939.

It was last seen within the constellation Pictor on 21 April 1939, (Note: Positions upon final observation was: α = 5^{h} 22.7^{m} , δ = –47° 07′) when Harry Edwin Wood obtained a 15-minute exposure photograph of the comet from the Union Observatory.

== See also ==
- C/1936 O1 (Kaho–Kozik–Lis)
