= V1315 Aquilae =

Variable star in the constellation Aquila

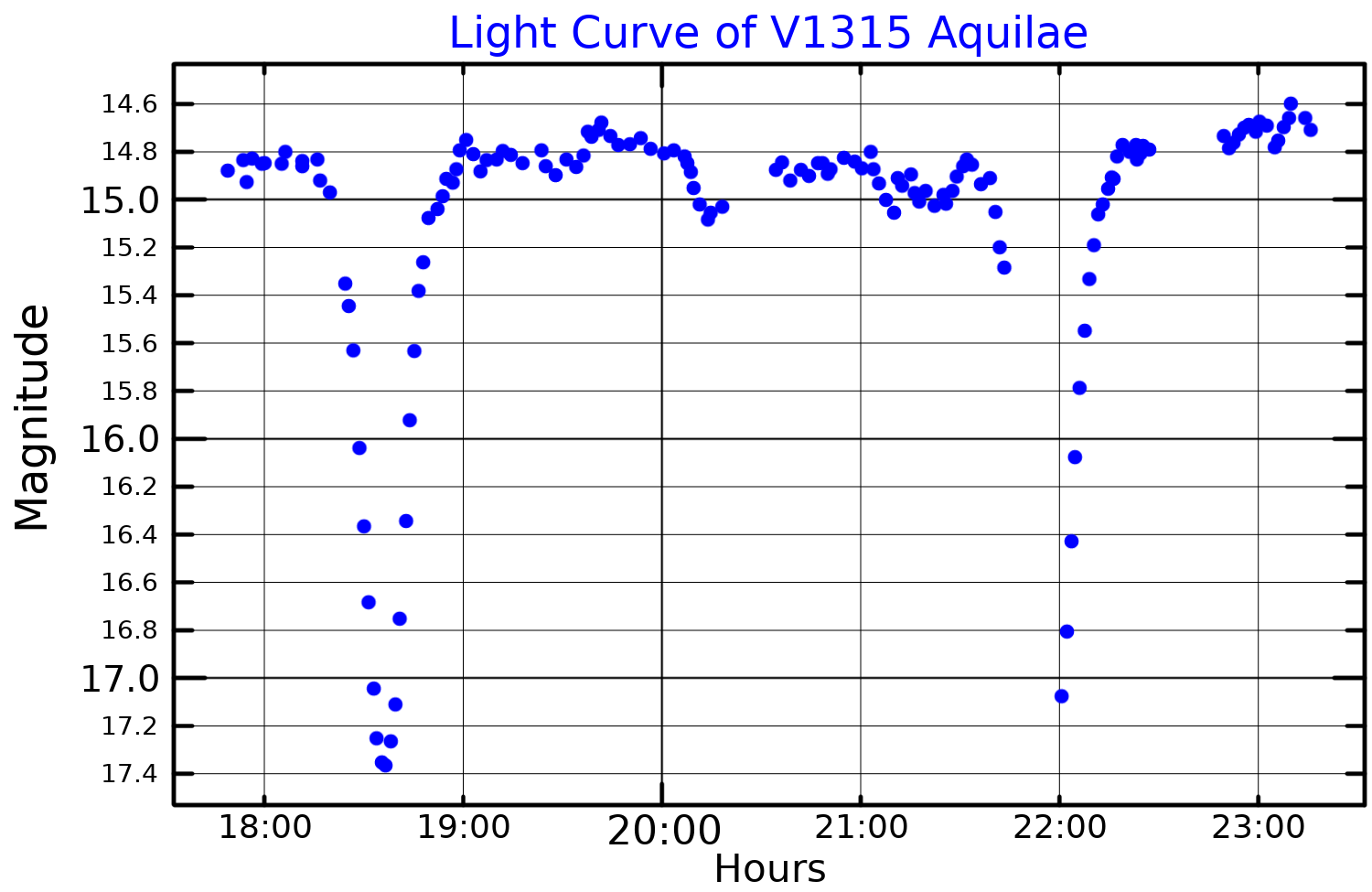
- A light curve for V1315 Aquilae, from data taken on 31 August 2004. Adapted from Papadaki et al. (2009)

Observation data Epoch 2015.5 Equinox ICRS
- Constellation: Aquila
- Right ascension: 19^{h} 13^{m} 54.531^{s}
- Declination: +12° 18′ 03.238″
- Apparent magnitude (V): 13.8

Characteristics
- Evolutionary stage: Nova-like Star
- B−V color index: 0.48
- J−H color index: 0.46
- J−K color index: 0.63
- Variable type: Eclipsing

Astrometry
| Radial velocity (R_{v}) | 38 km/s |
| Proper motion (μ) | RA: -2.381 mas/yr Dec.: -6.360 mas/yr |
| Parallax (π) | 2.2295±0.0314 mas |
| Distance | 1,460 ± 20 ly (449 ± 6 pc) |

Orbit
| Period (P) | 201 min |
| Inclination (i) | 78.2° |

Other designations
- V1315 Aql, 2MASS J19135453+1218033, CSV 8130

Database references
| SIMBAD | data |

V1315 Aquilae is a cataclysmic variable star in the north of the equatorial constellation of Aquila. It is in the sub-set of nova-like (NL) variables, specifically a SW Sextantis star (a type of white dwarf-donor star pair). These were characterized as having non-magnetic white dwarfs – thus that do not undergo dwarf-nova bright luminations ("eruptions"). There is countering evidence for some magnetism. Being a SW Sextantis star, V1315 Aquilae has a high rate of mass transfer, so it is in steady-state accretion and in a constant state of outburst. It emits most of its light in the visible range, and this comes from the accretion disk. The eclipse depth is 1.8 mag. No description of the donor star is made.

L. P. Metik discovered the star in 1961. Rather unusually, the discovery paper does not give the celestial coordinates of the object, but instead presents a map showing where the star is located in the sky relative to nearby stars. The star was given its variable star designation, V1315 Aquilae, in 1977.

== Nova shell ==
V1315 Aquilae has a roughly spherical shell of material around it with a maximal 1×10^{−5} solar masses (1/10000 M_{☉}), which is too small to be any starburst nebula or more advanced supernova remnant. It is consistent with models of a remnant of a nova-scale eruption roughly 500 to 1200 years old (that is, plus the time for the light from this system to travel to the Earth). V1315 Aquilae is the first nova-like system to have been discovered with a nova shell.
