= Marks–Family House =

Historic house in Ohio, United States

- U.S. National Register of Historic Places
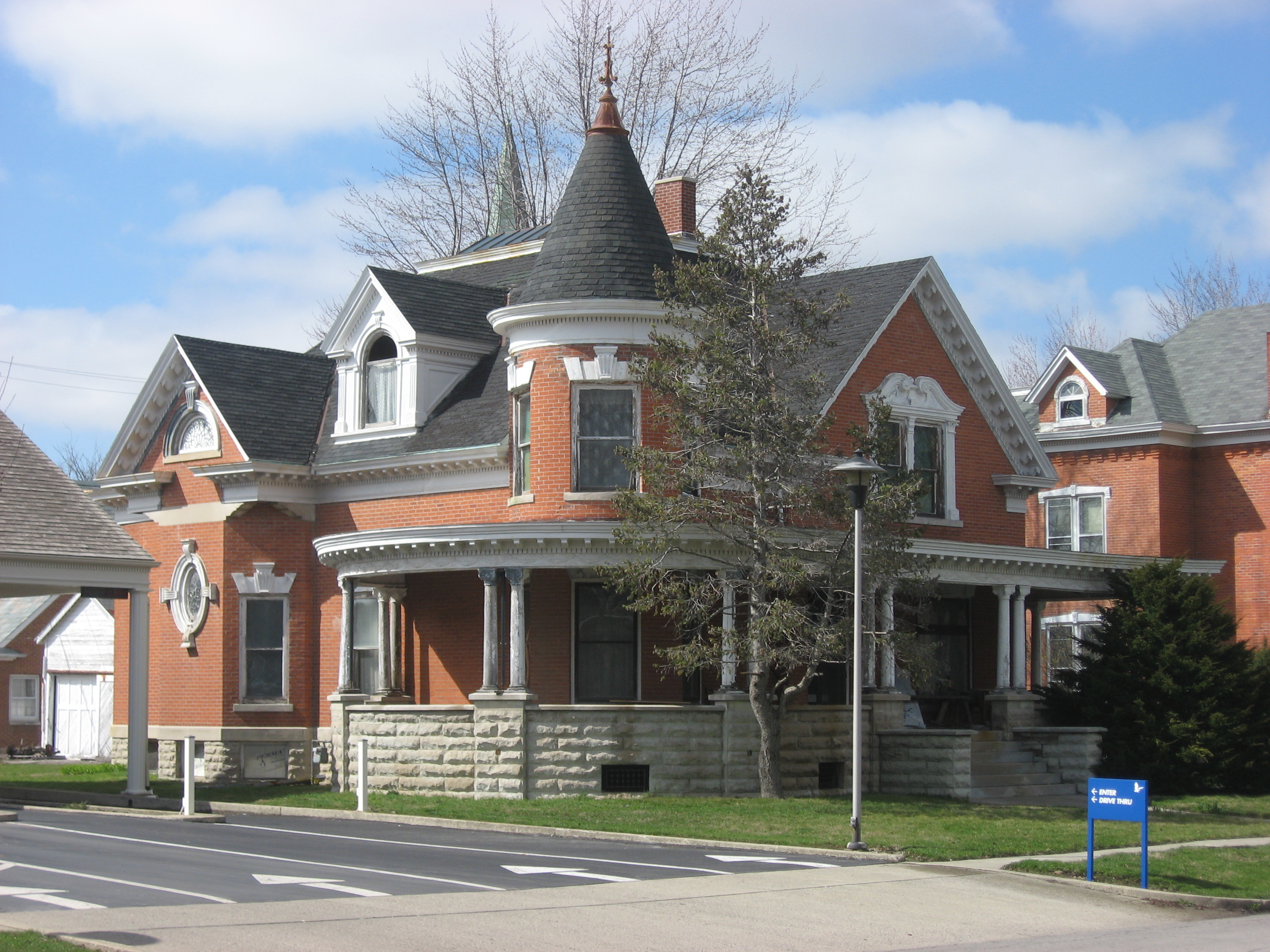
- Front and southern side of the house

- Location within Ohio Location within the United States
- Location: 233 N. Franklin St., Delphos, Ohio
- Coordinates: 40°50′39″N 84°20′14″W
- Area: less than one acre
- Built: 1902
- Architectural style: Queen Anne
- NRHP reference No.: 82003537
- Added to NRHP: April 1, 1982

The Marks–Family House is a historic house on the eastern (Allen County) side of Delphos, Ohio, United States. Erected along Franklin Street in 1902, it is a one-and-one-half-story house built in the Queen Anne style of architecture. Among its features are a tower in the corner of the house, a large wraparound porch with Ionic columns, and leaded glass windows of many shapes and sizes. Nearly every element of the interior is original, including the woodworking, the floors, the doors, the fireplace, the carvings, and much of the furniture.

In 1982, the Marks–Family House was listed on the National Register of Historic Places because of its historically significant architecture. Key to this significance was its well-preserved Queen Anne exterior and its original interior. Two other Delphos buildings are listed on the National Register: St. John's Catholic Church, which is also located on Franklin Street, and the Bredeick-Lang House on the western (Van Wert County) side of the city.
