= C/1936 K1 (Peltier) =

Non-periodic comet

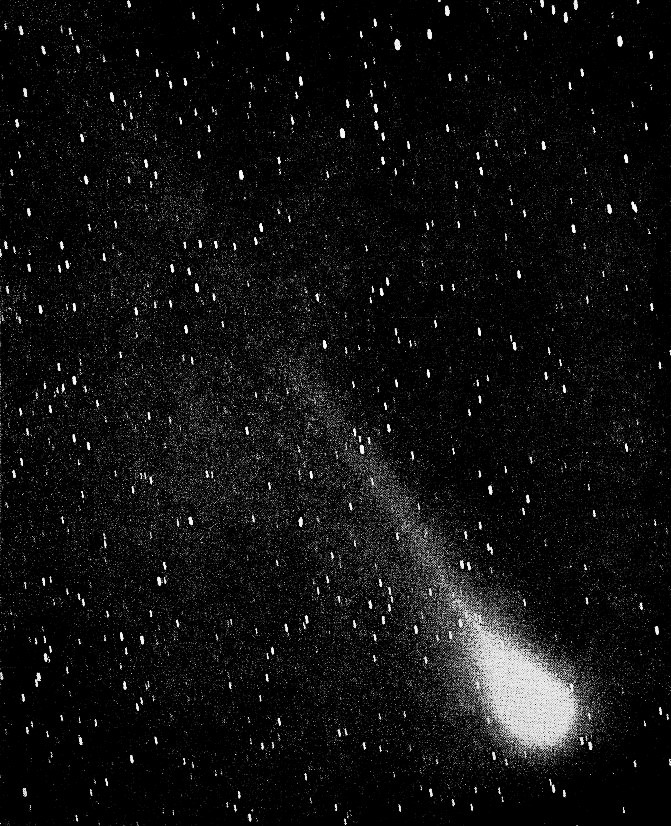
- Peltier's Comet photographed by George van Biesbroeck from the Yerkes Observatory, Wisconsin on 12 July 1936

Discovery
- Discovered by: Leslie C. Peltier
- Discovery site: Delphos, Ohio, USA
- Discovery date: 15 May 1936

Designations
- Alternative designations: 1936 II, 1936a

Orbital characteristics
- Epoch: 4 July 1936 (JD 2428353.5)
- Observation arc: 157 days
- Number of observations: 113
- Aphelion: ~272 AU
- Perihelion: 1.099 AU
- Semi-major axis: 136.71 AU
- Eccentricity: 0.99195
- Orbital period: ~1,600 years
- Inclination: 78.55°
- Longitude of ascending node: 134.94°
- Argument of periapsis: 148.48°
- Last perihelion: 8 July 1936
- T_{Jupiter}: 0.296
- Earth MOID: 0.166 AU
- Jupiter MOID: 1.837 AU

Physical characteristics
- Mean radius: 1.27 km (0.79 mi) (Note: Calculated mean radius using the formula: $\log_{10}\,(\,R\,)\ =\;0.9 +\;0.13 (\,H\,)$ Where $\,H\,$ is the comet's absolute total magnitude (M1))
- Comet total magnitude (M1): 6.13
- Comet nuclear magnitude (M2): 7.87
- Apparent magnitude: 2.9–4.1 (1936 apparition)

Peltier's Comet, formal designation C/1936 K1, is a non-periodic comet that became visible to the naked eye between July and August 1936. It is the fifth of 10 comets discovered by American astronomer, Leslie C. Peltier.
