= Edinburgh-Cape Blue Object Survey =

The Edinburgh-Cape Blue Object Survey (or EC in astronomical notation) is a major astronomical survey to discover blue stellar objects brighter than B~18 in the southern hemisphere, and is an extension of the earlier Palomar-Green survey. At the time of its initiation, the completed survey was expected to cover "around 10,000 square degrees at high galactic latitudes in the southern hemisphere to a limiting magnitude of B ~ 18 mag". The star EC 20058-5234, also known as QU Telescopii, was discovered during the survey. Other notable stars observed include BB Doradus, and the survey generally contributed to the number of known H-deficient stars.

The stellar objects to be observed were "selected by automatic techniques from U and B pairs of UK Schmidt Telescope plates scanned with the COSMOS measuring machine", with "follow-up photometry and spectroscopy" being obtained with the South African Astronomical Observatory telescopes.

== See also ==
- Deep Near Infrared Survey of the Southern Sky
