= PX Andromedae =

Star in the constellation Andromeda

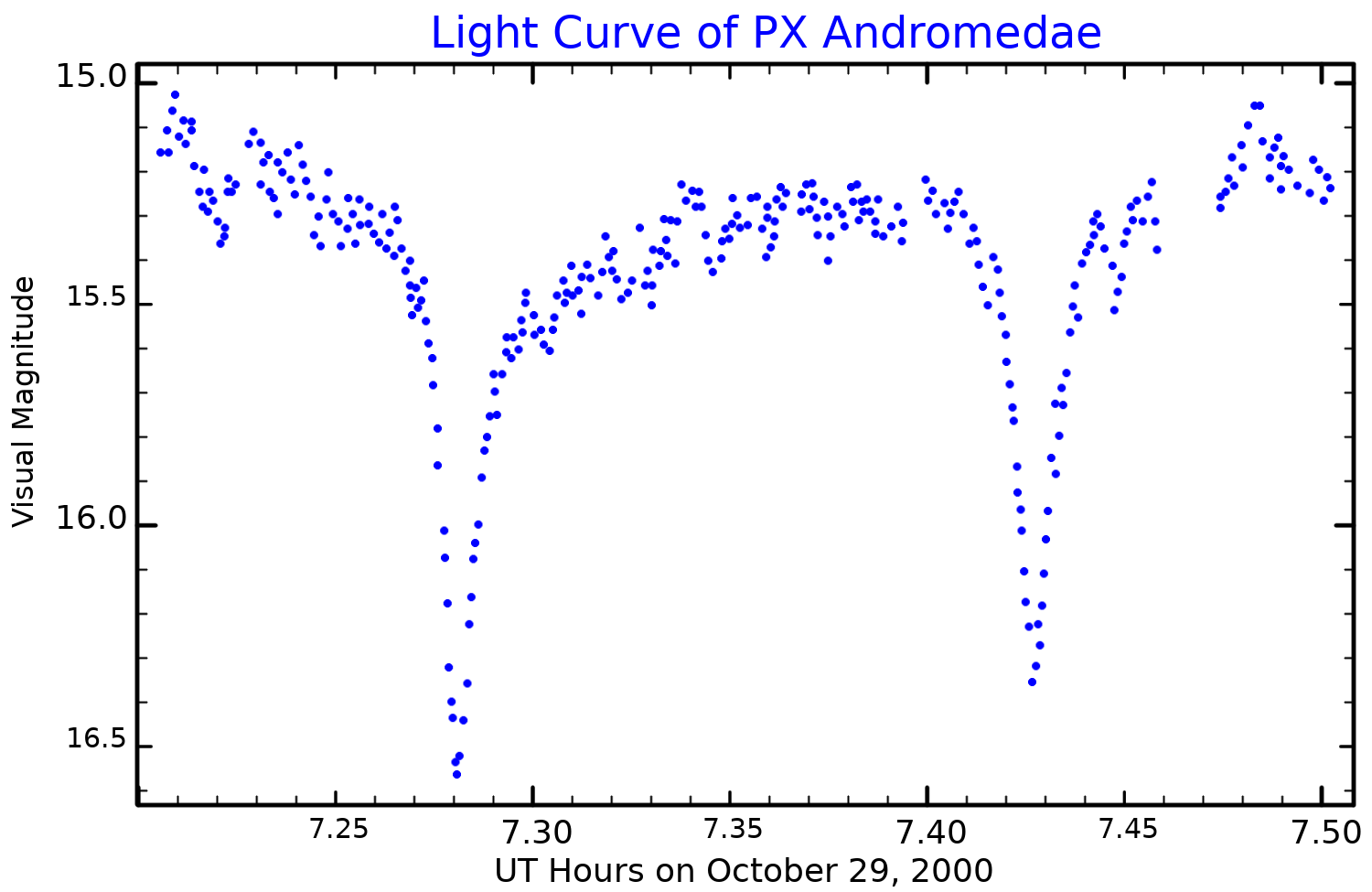
- A visual band light curve of PX Andromedae, adapted from Stanishev et al. (2002)

Observation data Epoch J2000 Equinox ICRS
- Constellation: Andromeda
- Right ascension: 00^{h} 30^{m} 05.8084^{s}
- Declination: +26° 17′ 26.439″
- Apparent magnitude (V): 14.04 – 17.00 variable

Characteristics
- Spectral type: pec(UG)
- Apparent magnitude (B): 11.84
- Apparent magnitude (R): 14.69
- Apparent magnitude (G): 14.8494
- Apparent magnitude (J): 14.652
- Apparent magnitude (H): 14.485
- Apparent magnitude (K): 14.344
- Variable type: SW Sex

Astrometry
Proper motion (μ)	RA: −10.924±0.081 mas/yr Dec.: −10.992±0.052 mas/yr
Parallax (π)	1.2323±0.0437 mas
Distance	2,650 ± 90 ly (810 ± 30 pc)

Orbit
Period (P)	3.5112 hours

Other designations
- 2MASS J00300581+2617264, AAVSO 0024+25, 2XMM J003005.7+261727, PG 0027+260

Database references
SIMBAD	data

PX Andromedae (often abbreviated to PX And) is an eclipsing cataclysmic variable star in the constellation Andromeda. It has been classified as a SW Sextantis variable, and its apparent visual magnitude varies between 14.04 and 17.

In 1982, Richard Green et al. listed PX Andromedae as a possible cataclysmic variable, based on spectra taken with the Hale Telescope. Observations in 1989 by Li Yong et al, at the Beijing Observatory detected rapid variations of the star's brightness of up to 0.2 magnitudes, as well as eclipses which occur every 3.5 hours. In 1992 the star was given the variable star designation PX Andromedae.

== Spectrum ==
The spectrum of PX Andromedae is variable, but typically shows a continuum with prominent broad emission lines of hydrogen and helium. Unlike many types of cataclysmic variable, the emission lines are generally single-peaked, although for a short time during each orbit they do show a double peak due to an absorption core within the emission lines. The single-peaked lines are shown in novae and dwarf novae outbursts, and PX Andromedae is often described as nova-like although it does not shown outbursts with large increases in brightness. However, it does have high and low states with the low states generally being fainter and showing weaker emission.

PX Andromedae is a very blue star with an ultraviolet excess, indicating that it includes very hot objects.

== Variability ==
PX Andromedae generally has a visual magnitude around 15 although there are continual rapid variations of up to a tenth of a magnitude on a timescale of minutes. Approximately every 3.5 hours the brightness drops by around a magnitude and then returns to the normal brightness in about half an hour, without a flat bottom, easily identifiable as partial eclipses. However, the depth of the eclipses varies from about 0.5 magnitudes to 1.5 magnitudes, and this appears to cycle every 4.8 days, coinciding with the negative superhump cycle. Deeper eclipses occur when the superhump cycle is near its minimum. Possible variations with a period of 0.207 days are likely to be an observational alias of the superhump period. PX Andromedae may have both high (brighter) and low (fainter) states for its mean brightness, but the timing of these is uncertain.

The eclipses have been timed to occur every 0.1463 days, assumed to be the orbital period. The negative superhump period is 4.43 days. Positive superhumps have sometimes been claimed, but are not always present.

Stars with this type of variation are classified as SW Sextantis variables and PX Andromedae is sometimes considered one of the prototypes for the class. Although they are considered to be cataclysmic variables and are often described as "nova-like", they do not show intermittent outbursts. Rather they are in a continuous outburst state with a spectrum similar to an ongoing nova.

== System ==
Since the spectral classification of PX Andromedae is peculiar and similar to U Geminorum, it is commonly accepted that in this system a white dwarf is accreting matter from a donor star, and an accretion disc has formed around the former. The negative superhumps show that the accretion disk is tilted with respect to the white dwarf rotation axis, and has a retrograde precession. Moreover, the donor star does not eclipse the central part of the disk – proven by modulation existing of the eclipse depth.
