= DW Ursae Majoris =

Variable star in the constellation Ursa Major

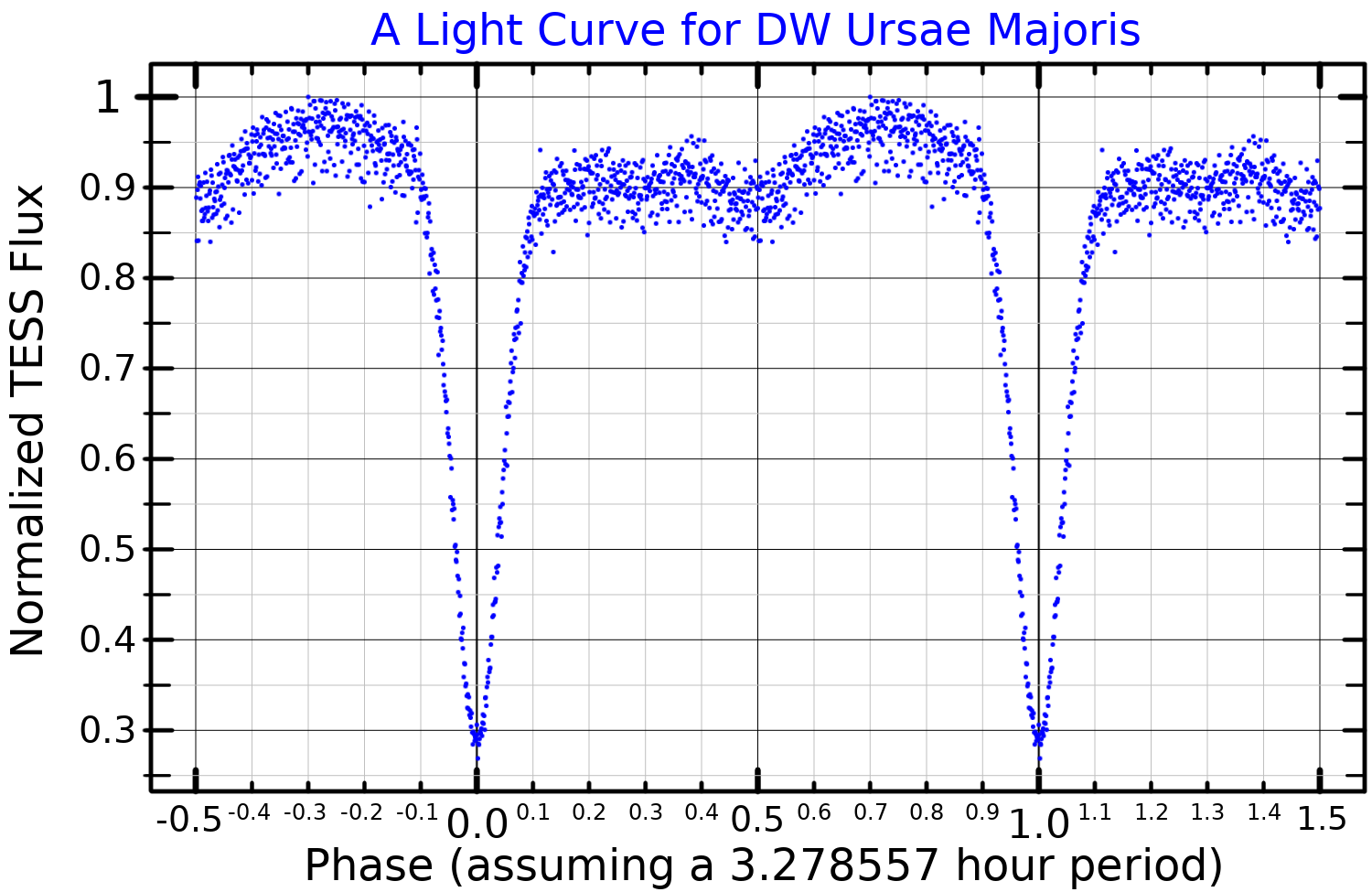
- A light curve for DW Ursae Majoris, plotted from TESS data

Observation data Epoch J2000 Equinox ICRS
- Constellation: Ursa Major
- Right ascension: 10^{h} 33^{m} 52.875^{s}
- Declination: +58° 46′ 54.72″
- Apparent magnitude (V): 13.6 to 18.0

Characteristics
- Spectral type: M7±2.0
- Variable type: Algol variable

Astrometry
Proper motion (μ)	RA: 0.974 mas/yr Dec.: 1.396 mas/yr
Parallax (π)	1.6958±0.0196 mas
Distance	1,920 ± 20 ly (590 ± 7 pc)

Orbit
Period (P)	3.2785566 h
Semi-major axis (a)	1.14±0.06 R_{☉}
Inclination (i)	82±4°

Details

White dwarf
Mass	0.77±0.07 M_{☉}
Radius	0.012±0.001 R_{☉}
Surface gravity (log g)	8 (assumed) cgs
Temperature	50,000±1,000 K

Red dwarf
Mass	0.25±0.05 M_{☉}
Radius	0.34±0.04 R_{☉}

Other designations
- PG 1030+590, DW UMa, AAVSO 1027+59, GSC 03822-00464, 2MASS J10335283+5846547

Database references
SIMBAD	data

DW Ursae Majoris is an eclipsing binary star system in the northern circumpolar constellation of Ursa Major, abbreviated DW UMa. It is a cataclysmic variable of the SX Sextanis type, consisting of a compact white dwarf that is accreting matter from an orbiting companion star. The brightness of this source ranges from an apparent visual magnitude of 13.6 down to magnitude 18, which is too faint to be viewed with the naked eye. The distance to this system is approximately 1,920 light years based on parallax measurements.

In 1982, R. F. Green and associates identified this star as a cataclysmic variable candidate with the Palomar–Green survey designation PG 1030+590. A. W. Shafter and F. V. Hessman in 1984 found this to be a close eclipsing binary system with a period of 3.27 hours. This is a nova-like binary where mass is being transferred from a late-type star to a white dwarf companion. This material is first accumulated in an accretion disk orbiting the white dwarf. Typically, the light curve for an eclipsing binary of this type should display a hump-like feature from where the stream of material interacts with the disk. However, during early observations, no such feature was observed before the eclipse.

The behavior of the emission lines in the spectrum of this star were found to resemble those of other SW Sextantis variables. In 2000, the system was observed with the Hubble Space Telescope and was found to be in a low state about three magnitudes fainter, unlike previous observations where it had been in a high state. Comparison of the ultraviolet spectrum in the two states suggested that the accretion disk is self-eclipsing and it can obscure the view of the white dwarf. The light output of the system undergoes a 13.6 year cycle of variation, probably because of precession of the accretion disk. Both positive and negative superhumps are observed that vary over time in a complex fashion. Mass is being transferred from the donor star at a rate of about 10^{−8} M_{☉}·yr^{−1}.
