= SW Sextantis variable =

Type of variable star

SW Sextantis variable stars are a kind of cataclysmic variable star; they are double-star systems in which there is mass transfer from a red dwarf to a white dwarf forming a stable accretion disc around the latter. Unlike other non-magnetic cataclysmic variables, the emission lines from hydrogen and helium are not doubled, except briefly near phase 0.5.

== Characteristics ==
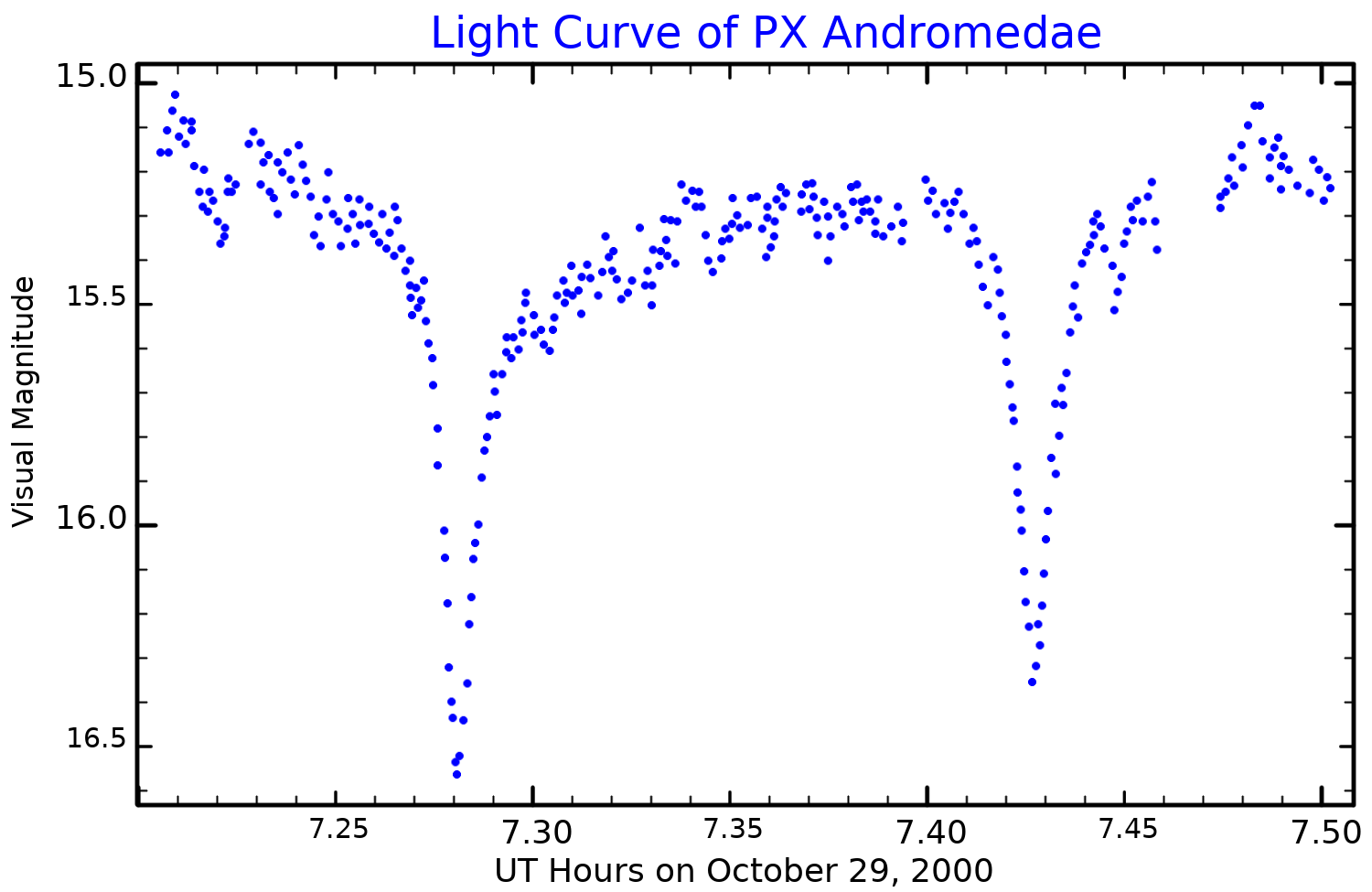
Light curve of PX Andromedae, a SW Sextantis variable

SW Sextantis stars have an orbital period between 2.8 and 4 hours; most systems were discovered by surveys of eclipsing variables, so the orbit is nearly edge-on with respect to the Earth. Their spectra resemble those of a dwarf nova in outburst, with signs of a permanently ionised accretion disc. Material is constantly flowing into the disc from the companion star, and friction within the disc causes it to emit optical light. It is more difficult to find SW Sextantis systems with low inclination, since it is necessary to examine many stellar spectra without being able to restrict to eclipsing variables; however, surveys have been performed, and suggest that some of the observed properties of SW Sextantis stars are accidental results of a sample restricted to high inclination systems

Emission lines of hydrogen (the Balmer series) and helium are observed, and are not doubled (as one would expect by Doppler shift of light emitted from the edges of a fast-rotating disc), but the wings are broadened to the point that the spread of source velocities can be as much as 4000 km/s. For a brief period near phase 0.5 of their orbits, SW Sextantis stars do show doubling of their emission lines and this is a defining character of the class. In eclipsing systems, the emission lines are scarcely detected at minimum light because the white dwarf and the central part of the accretion disc are hidden behind the red dwarf.

In the ultraviolet we observe emission lines from the white dwarf, which indicate an unusually high temperature and imply a high accretion rate. Furthermore, the radial velocity of an SW Sextantis star determined from the disc emission lines is not the same as that determined from the white dwarf.

The orbital period of SW Sextantis systems is always just above the period gap, suggesting a joint-development phase for these cataclysmic variables.

== Interpretation ==
Models of SW Sextantis stars must explain the high mass transfer rate and the period distribution just above the period-gap. The standard theory of cataclysmic variables suggests that the rate of mass transfer is determined by loss of angular momentum due to magnetic fields. The stellar wind of the red dwarf sends ionised plasma into space, which travels along magnetic field lines; indeed, it is trapped in the magnetic field lines and follows the rotation of the star. Since the magnetic field accelerates the escaping plasma, the rotation of the star is braked. This in turn reduces the total angular momentum of the double-star system, which along with the rearrangement of the matter in the system leads to the orbital radius getting smaller, which keeps the mass transfer rate steady.

Under this model, the core of the red dwarf is rotating faster than the orbital period. As mass transfer causes the radius of the star to shrink, conservation of angular momentum means that it spins faster, and this means the dynamo effect generates a stronger magnetic field. This increases the magnetic braking effect and accordingly the mass transfer rate.

Another interpretation of SW Sextantis stars is that the high mass transfer rate is only temporary. Some cataclysmic variables (e.g. the classical novae RR Pictoris, XX Tauri and V728 Scorpii) have periods just above the period gap, and this is interpreted as part of the hibernation model, where, after a nova eruption, the white dwarf is unusually hot; it heats the red dwarf, causing a higher mass transfer rate until the white dwarf has cooled down again. As it cools, the red dwarf shrinks and the mass transfer rate drops to quite low levels; eventually loss of orbital angular momentum causes the stars to get closer together again, and mass transfer resumes. In this model, SW Sextantis stars represent a stage in the life of a cataclysmic variable either shortly before or shortly after a nova eruption.

== Examples ==
- PX Andromedae
- DW Ursae Majoris
- LS Pegasi
- BB Doradus
- SW Sextantis (prototype)
- V533 Herculis

Donald W. Hoard at the Max Planck Institute for Astronomy in Heidelberg maintains a list of SW Sextantis stars mentioned in the literature, and a description of the characteristics used to identify them.
