= QU Telescopii =

Star in the constellation Telescopium

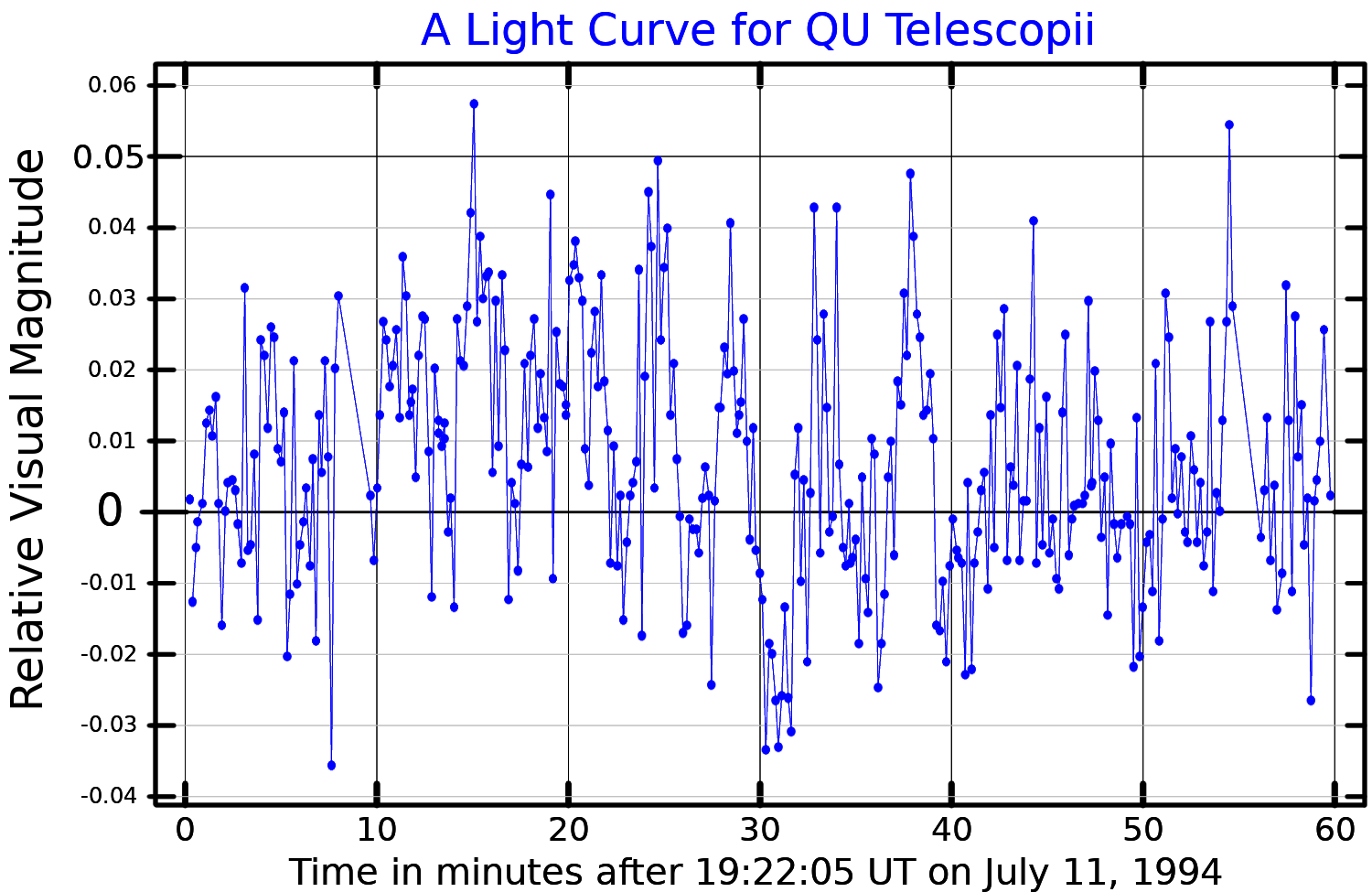
- A visual band light curve for QU Telescopii, adapted from Koen et al. (1995)

Observation data Epoch J2000.0 Equinox J2000.0(ICRS)
- Constellation: Telescopium
- Right ascension: 20^{h} 09^{m} 40.19^{s}
- Declination: −52° 25′ 15.86″
- Apparent magnitude (V): 15.03

Characteristics
- Evolutionary stage: white dwarf
- Spectral type: DB2
- U−B color index: −0.71
- B−V color index: −0.04
- Variable type: V777 Herculis

Astrometry
Proper motion (μ)	RA: +12.024 mas/yr Dec.: −76.714 mas/yr
Parallax (π)	8.4145±0.0650 mas
Distance	388 ± 3 ly (118.8 ± 0.9 pc)

Details
Mass	0.569±0.022 M_{☉}
Surface gravity (log g)	7.91±0.05 cgs
Temperature	24,843±1,363 K

Other designations
- QU Telescopii, Gaia DR2 6665910709364014336

Database references
SIMBAD	data

QU Telescopii, is a star in the constellation Telescopium. With an apparent magnitude of 15.03, it's impossible to detect with the naked eye and requires a powerful telescope to be seen; this degenerate object is located 388 light years from the Solar System based on parallax.

QU Telescopii has a classification of DB2, which states it's a white dwarf with He I lines present in its atmosphere. At the moment, it has 56.9% the mass of the Sun, but a high surface gravity suggests QU Telescopii has a low radius. It has an effective temperature of 24,843 K, which gives it a blue hue as opposed to a white hue. QU Telescopii belongs to a class of stars known as V777 Herculis variables or DBV stars. First noticed in the Edinburgh-Cape Blue Object Survey published in 1992, it was found to be variable in 1995.
