= C/1936 O1 (Kaho–Kozik–Lis) =

Long-period comet

Discovery
- Discovered by: Shigeru Kaho; Stefan M. Kozik; Władysław Lis
- Discovery date: 17 July 1936

Designations
- Alternative designations: 1936b 1936 III

Orbital characteristics
- Epoch: 11 July 1936 (JD 2428360.5)
- Observation arc: 129 days
- Number of observations: 65
- Aphelion: ~184 AU
- Perihelion: 0.518 AU
- Eccentricity: 0.99439
- Orbital period: ~888 years
- Inclination: 121.94°
- Longitude of ascending node: 265.01°
- Argument of periapsis: 45.850°
- Last perihelion: 15 July 1936
- Next perihelion: ~2820s
- T_{Jupiter}: –0.415

Physical characteristics
- Comet nuclear magnitude (M2): 8.4
- Apparent magnitude: 4.0–5.0 (1936 apparition)

Comet Kaho–Kosik–Lis, also known as C/1936 O1, is a long-period comet that became barely visible to the naked eye in July 1936. It is the parent body of the Psi Scorpiids meteor shower.

== Discovery and observations ==
The comet was simultaneously discovered by three astronomers, Shigeru Kaho (Japan), Stefan M. Kozik (Turkmen SSR) and Władysław Lis (Poland) on the night of 17 July 1936. It was a 6th-magnitude object located within the constellation Leo Minor at the time of its discovery, (Note: Reported initial position upon discovery was: α = 10^{h} 03.6^{m} , δ = 34° 26′) and had started its outbound flight upon reaching perihelion about two days earlier.

== See also ==
- C/1939 B1 (Kozik–Peltier)
