= BB Doradus =

Cataclysmic variable star in the constellation Dorado

BB Dor
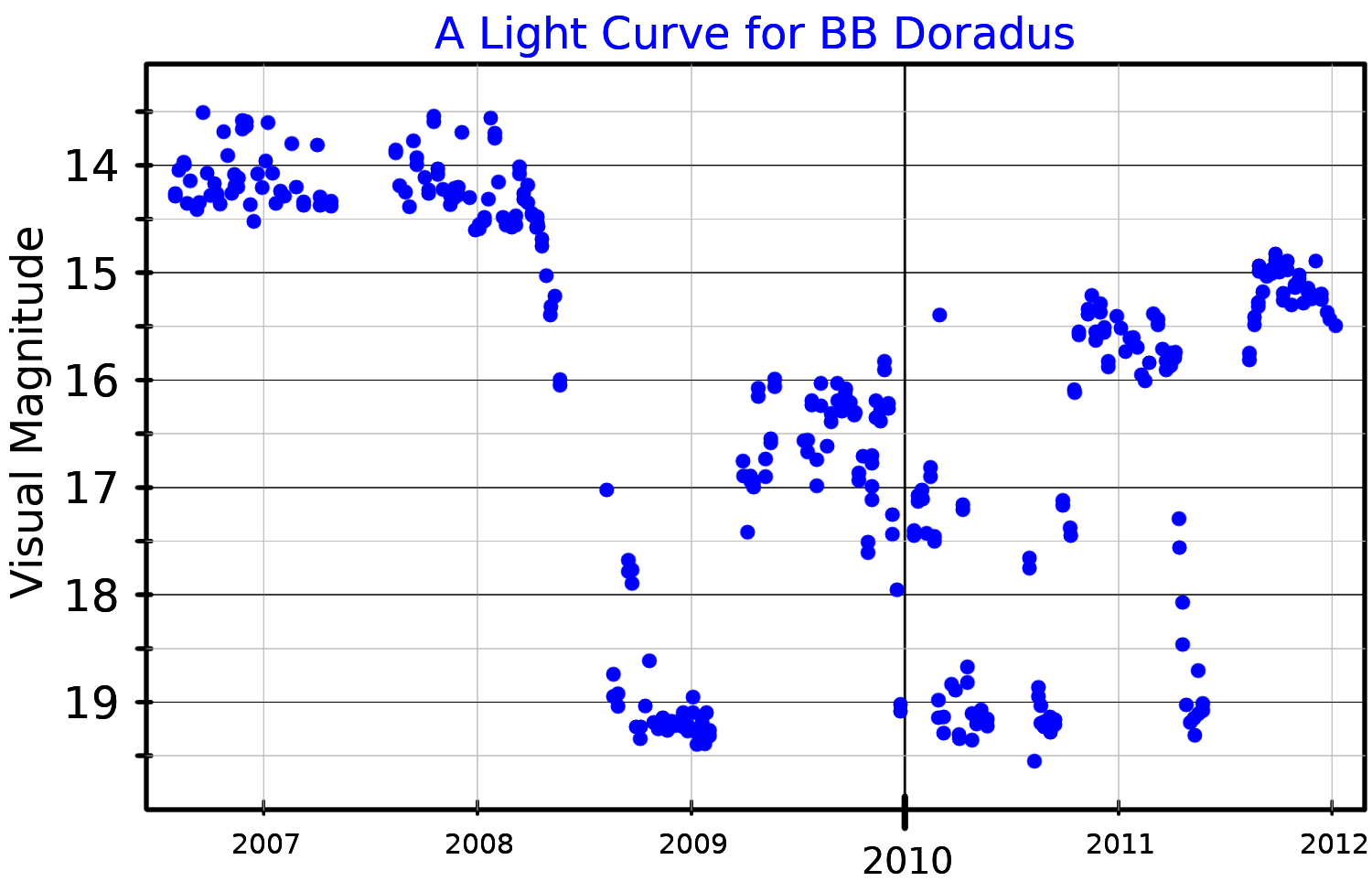
- A visual band light curve for BB Doradus, adapted from Rodríguez-Gil et al. (2012)

Observation data Epoch J2000 Equinox ICRS
- Constellation: Dorado
- Right ascension: 05^{h} 29^{m} 28.66^{s}
- Declination: −58° 54′ 46.7″
- Apparent magnitude (V): 14.3-19.3

Characteristics
- Spectral type: WD + M3-4V
- Variable type: SW Sex

Astrometry
| Parallax (π) | 1.0871±0.0263 mas |
| Distance | 3,000 ± 70 ly (920 ± 20 pc) |
| Absolute magnitude (M_{V}) | 15.52 |

Details
| Temperature | 9365 K |

Other designations
- BB Dor, GSC 08530-00528, AAVSO 0528-58, EC 05287-5857, 1RXS J0529-5854.

Database references
| SIMBAD | data |

BB Doradus or BB Dor is a cataclysmic variable, a pre-nova star, thus a close pair binary star system. It is composed of a red dwarf and a white dwarf. Observations of the white dwarf's faint but certain accretion disk are consistent with it being at ~10° inclination (to the line of sight from the Earth).

Its parallax (movement against background stars due to the Earth's orbit around the Sun) given by the Gaia space observatory's second data release puts the pair at about 3,000 light years away.
