= C/1943 W1 (van Gent–Peltier–Daimaca) =

Non-periodic comet

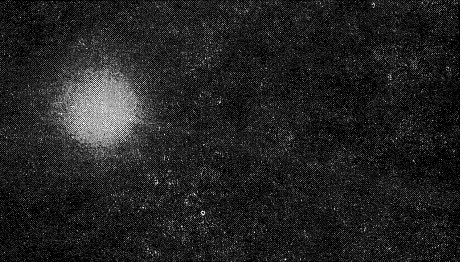
- C/1943 W1 photographed by George van Biesbroeck on 24 December 1943 from the Yerkes Observatory

Discovery
- Discovered by: Hendrik van Gent; Leslie C. Peltier; Victor Daimaca
- Discovery date: 27 November 1943

Designations
- Alternative designations: 1944 I, 1943g

Orbital characteristics
- Epoch: 3 December 1943 (JD 2431061.5)
- Observation arc: 10 days
- Number of observations: 12
- Aphelion: ~3,600 AU
- Perihelion: 0.874 AU
- Semi-major axis: ~1,800 AU
- Eccentricity: 0.9995
- Orbital period: ~76,000 years
- Inclination: 136.183°
- Longitude of ascending node: 58.630°
- Argument of periapsis: 33.092°
- Last perihelion: 12 January 1944
- T_{Jupiter}: –0.834
- Earth MOID: 0.0335 AU
- Jupiter MOID: 0.8510 AU

Physical characteristics
- Mean radius: 0.397 km (0.247 mi) (Note: Calculated mean radius using the formula: $\log_{10}\,(\,R\,)\ =\;0.9 +\;0.13 (\,H\,)$ Where $\,H\,$ is the comet's absolute total magnitude (M1))
- Comet total magnitude (M1): 10.0
- Apparent magnitude: 6.0 (1943 apparition)

Comet van Gent–Peltier–Daimaca, formally designated as C/1943 W1, is a non-periodic comet with a rather peculiar discovery. It was independently discovered by four astronomers, however the established system of naming comets by the International Astronomical Union only recognizes the names of the first three people who observed it.

== Discovery ==
It was first observed by Dutch astronomer Hendrik van Gent on 27 November 1943 as a diffuse magnitude 9.0 object in the constellation Puppis. However, due to the ongoing Second World War, the report of his discovery took longer than usual that various other astronomers had enough time to make independent discoveries. By the time it reached magnitude 6.0, it was then rediscovered by astronomers Leslie C. Peltier, Victor Daimaca, and Geoffrey Francis Kelloway on 16, 17, and 19 December, respectively, however they were not identified as the same object as van Gent's comet until its orbit was calculated in 22 December. As established by the IAU, only the names of the first three observers are recognized as the comet's co-discoverers.

== Possible meteor shower ==
The very small MOID with Earth has led various astronomers since 1948 to think that this comet is a potential parent body of a yet to be identified meteor shower. Analysis of past observations from 1925 and 1935 initially identified this hypothetical meteor shower as the Alpha Monocerotids, where it reaches its peak on 21 and 22 November each year. Follow-up studies from more recent observations however has concluded that the aforementioned meteor shower wasn't related to C/1943 W1 itself, but rather a still unidentified short-period comet yet to be discovered.
