= 3850 Peltier =

Main-belt asteroid

Discovery
- Discovered by: E. Bowell
- Discovery site: Anderson Mesa Stn.
- Discovery date: 7 October 1986

Designations
- Named after: Leslie Peltier (American amateur astronomer)
- Alternative designations: 1986 TK_{2} · 1949 PC; 1969 OC_{1} · 1979 OX_{13} 1982 OW
- Minor planet category: main-belt · Flora

Orbital characteristics
- Epoch 4 September 2017 (JD 2458000.5)
- Uncertainty parameter 0
- Observation arc: 47.47 yr (17,339 days)
- Aphelion: 2.5967 AU
- Perihelion: 1.8718 AU
- Semi-major axis: 2.2342 AU
- Eccentricity: 0.1622
- Orbital period (sidereal): 3.34 yr (1,220 days)
- Mean anomaly: 126.84°
- Mean motion: 0° 17^{m} 42.36^{s} / day
- Inclination: 5.2687°
- Longitude of ascending node: 124.13°
- Argument of perihelion: 207.30°

Physical characteristics
- Dimensions: 4.00 km (calculated)
- Synodic rotation period: 2.4287±0.0002 h (Note: Pravec (2013) web: rotation period 2.4287±0.0002 hours with a brightness amplitude of 0.09 mag. Summary figures for (3850) Peltier at Collaborative Asteroid Lightcurve Link (CALL) and Pravec, P.; Wolf, M.; Sarounova, L. (2013)); 2.4289±0.0001 h
- Geometric albedo: 0.4 (assumed)
- Spectral type: SMASS = V · V
- Absolute magnitude (H): 13.6 · 13.62±0.37

3850 Peltier, provisional designation 1986 TK_{2}, is a Florian asteroid and suspected interloper from the inner regions of the asteroid belt, approximately 4 kilometers in diameter. It was discovered on 7 October 1986, by American astronomer Edward Bowell at Lowell's Anderson Mesa Station, near Flagstaff, Arizona. The asteroid was named after American amateur astronomer Leslie Peltier.

== Orbit and classification ==
In the SMASS taxonomy, Peltier is a V-type asteroid but possesses the orbital characteristics of a member of the Flora family, which is one of the largest groups of stony S-type asteroids in the main-belt. It is therefore thought to be an unrelated interloper that does not origin from the Flora family's parent body. Peltier orbits the Sun in the inner main-belt at a distance of 1.9–2.6 AU once every 3 years and 4 months (1,220 days). Its orbit has an eccentricity of 0.16 and an inclination of 5° with respect to the ecliptic. In 1949, it was first identified as 1949 PC at Johannesburg. The body's observation arc begins at Crimea-Nauchnij in 1979, when it was identified as 1979 OX_{13}, 10 years prior to its official discovery observation at Anderson Mesa.

== Physical characteristics ==
=== Rotation period ===
A rotational lightcurve of Peltier was obtained by Czech astronomer Petr Pravec at Ondřejov Observatory in October 2006. (Note: Rotational lightcurve plot of (3850) Peltier by Petr Pravec, Ondrejov Asteroid Photometry Project) Lightcurve analysis gave a rotation period of 2.4287 hours with a brightness variation of 0.09 magnitude (U=2). In December 2013, photometric observations by Australian amateur astronomer Julian Oey gave a concurring period of 2.4289 hours and an amplitude of 0.10 magnitude (U=3).

=== Diameter and albedo ===
Peltier has not been observed by any space-based surveys such as the Infrared Astronomical Satellite IRAS, the Japanese Akari satellite, or NASA's Wide-field Infrared Survey Explorer with its subsequent NEOWISE mission. The Collaborative Asteroid Lightcurve Link assumes a standard albedo for V-type asteroids of 0.40 and calculates a diameter of 4.00 kilometers using an absolute magnitude of 13.6.

== Naming ==
This minor planet was named in memory of American amateur astronomer Leslie Peltier (1900–1980), who has discovered 12 comets and several novae including Nova Herculis 1963. Naming citation was provided by David H. Levy and published by the MPC on 20 May 1989 (M.P.C. 14633).
