= Lucienne Divan =

French astrophysicist (1920–2015)

- Born: 2 September 1920; Sainte-Radegonde-en-Touraine (Indre-et-Loire, France)
- Died: 21 December 2015 (aged 95)
- Occupation: Astrophysicist
- Honours: Legion of Honor (1988)

Lucienne Divan (September 2, 1920 – December 21, 2015) was a French astrophysicist, who spent her career at the Institut d'astrophysique de Paris. Divan worked on the spectral and luminosity classification of stars and on interstellar absorption.

== Early life and education ==
Divan was born in Sainte-Radegonde-en-Touraine, Indre-et-Loire. A student of the École normale supérieure de jeunes filles, Lucienne Divan passed her examination in physics (first, 1945), then pursued her career at the Institut d'astrophysique de Paris from 1949, where she joined Daniel Barbier and Daniel Chalonge. When she retired, she moved to the Haute-Provence Observatory; she died on December 21, 2015, at Saint-Michel-l'Observatoire.

== Career ==
With Barbier and Chalonge, Lucienne Divan contributed to the development of the three-dimensional stellar spectroscopic classification system called Classification of the IAP or BCD (for Barbier-Chalonge-Divan). This system was based on the spectro-photometric properties of the Balmer discontinuity in stellar spectra from a series of articles published in the Annals of Astrophysics entitled "Researches on stellar continuous spectra." The BCD classification system for stars is not utilized today, scientists prefer the MK spectral classification system. Divan also published on the spectral properties of particular stars like Be stars, and particular variable stars like V533 Hercules and FG Sagittae.

Lucienne Divan is the author and co-author of 74 articles listed in the NASA/ADS bibliography.

== Honors ==
- 1971 - Asteroid (1892) Lucienne, discovered and named by Paul Wild.
- 1973 - Prix Jules Janssen (vermeil)
- 1988 - Knight of the Legion of Honor
