= V533 Herculis =

Nova in the constellation Hercules

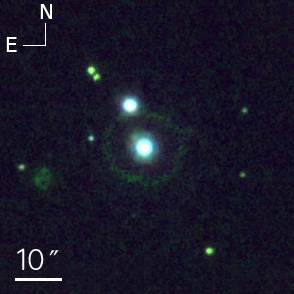
- RGB composite color image of the faint shell surrounding V533 Herculis, made from three narrow band images: Blue = 4800Å, green = Hα at 6563 Å and red = [NII] at 6583 Å. From Santamaria et al. 2020

Observation data Epoch J2000.0 Equinox J2000.0
- Constellation: Hecules
- Right ascension: 18^{h} 14^{m} 20.485^{s}
- Declination: +41° 51′ 22.07″
- Apparent magnitude (V): 3.0 - 15.0

Astrometry
Distance	1202+52 −41 pc

Characteristics
- Variable type: Classical Nova

Other designations
- V533 Her, Nova Her 1963, AAVSO 1811+41

Database references
SIMBAD	data

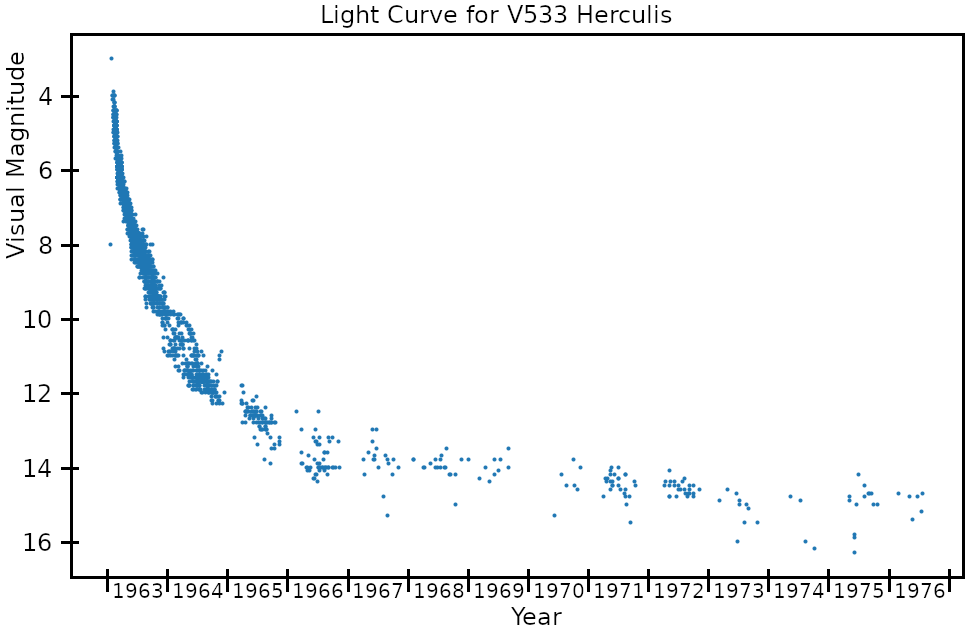
Visual band light curve of V533 Herculis, plotted using AAVSO data

V533 Herculis was a nova visible to the naked eye, which occurred in 1963 in the constellation of Hercules.

The nova was discovered by the Swedish amateur astronomer Elis Dahlgren on 6 February 1963, and independently by an American amateur, Leslie Peltier, on 7 February 1963. Both reported it to be a 4th magnitude star. Subsequent examination of pre-discovery images, taken by the Baker-Nunn satellite tracking group at the Tokyo Observatory, showed that the star had begun its nova event as early as 18:36 UT on 26 January 1963, when it had a magnitude of 8. It had attained its peak brightness, magnitude 3, by 17:38 UT on 30 January 1968.

All novae are binary stars, with a "donor" star transferring matter to a white dwarf. In the case of V533 Herculis, the pair's orbital period is 3.43 hours. Thorstensen and Taylor analysed spectra of the star in its quiescent state, and concluded that it is a non-eclipsing SW Sextantis variable, implying that the donor star is a red dwarf. Knigge derived a mass of 0.225 M_{☉}, and a radius of 0.333 R_{☉}, for the donor star.

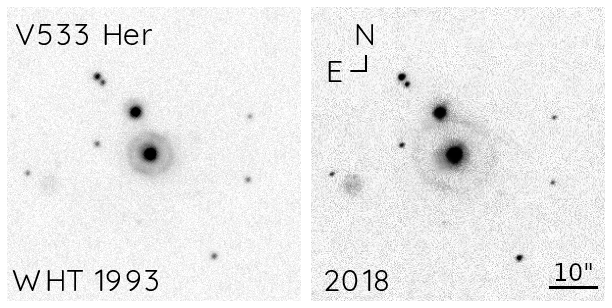
Two images of the shell surrounding V533 Hercules taken 25 years apart, showing the nebula's expansion. Both were taken with Hα filters, left at the William Herschel Telescope, and right with the Nordic Optical Telescope.

Images of V533 Herculis taken with the Hubble Space Telescope show a faint, approximately circular shell (nebula) with a diameter of 10±1.4 arcseconds, surrounding the star. The shell is expanding at 850±150 km/s. Santamaria et al. obtained similar results by comparing images of the shell taken in 1993 and 2018. They found that by 2018 the slightly elliptical shell had major and minor axis of 16.8×15.2 arc seconds, and it was expanding at a rate of 0.152×0.139 arc seconds per year, implying a physical expansion rate of 850×770 km/sec.

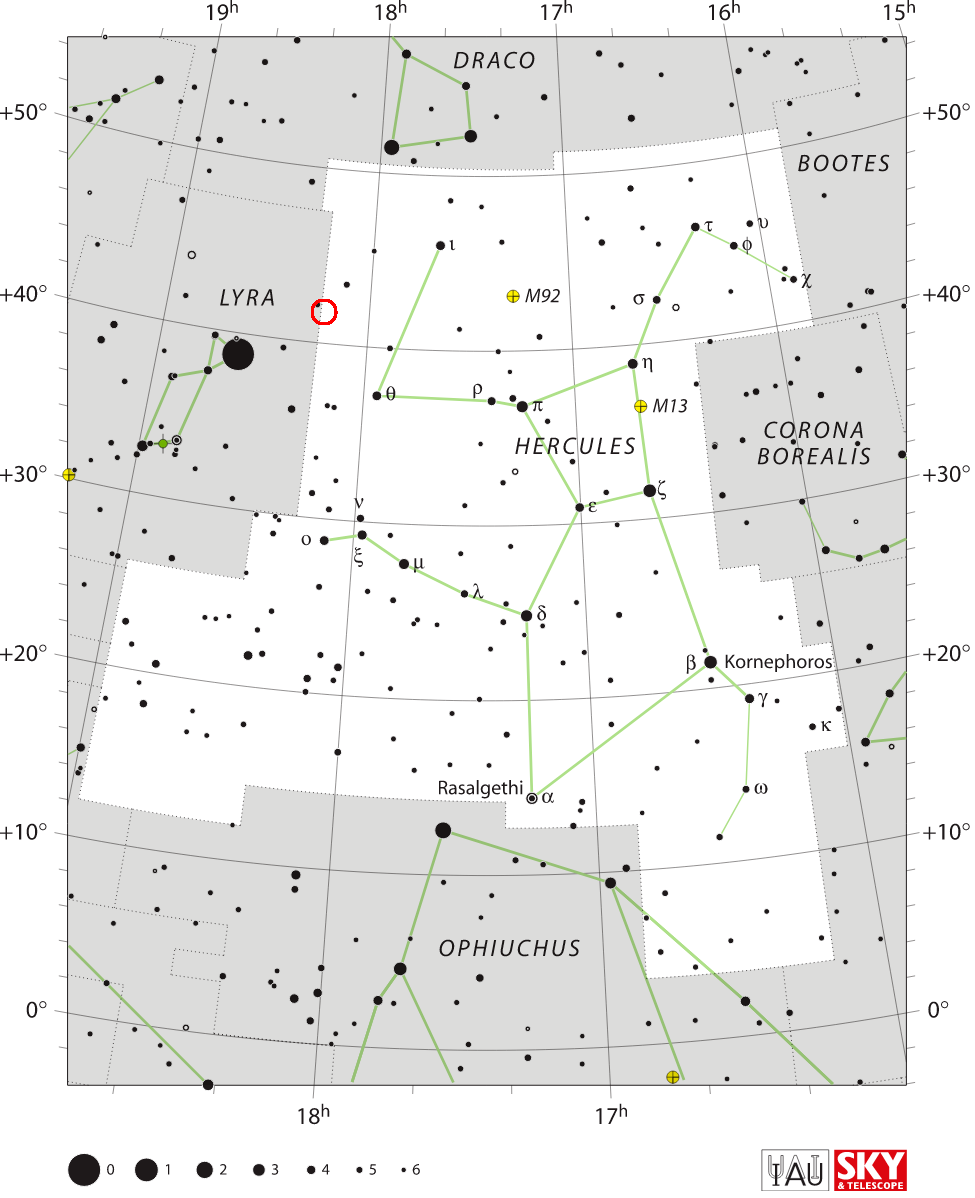
The location of V533 Herculis (circled in red)
