= XX Tauri =

1927 Nova seen in the constellation Taurus

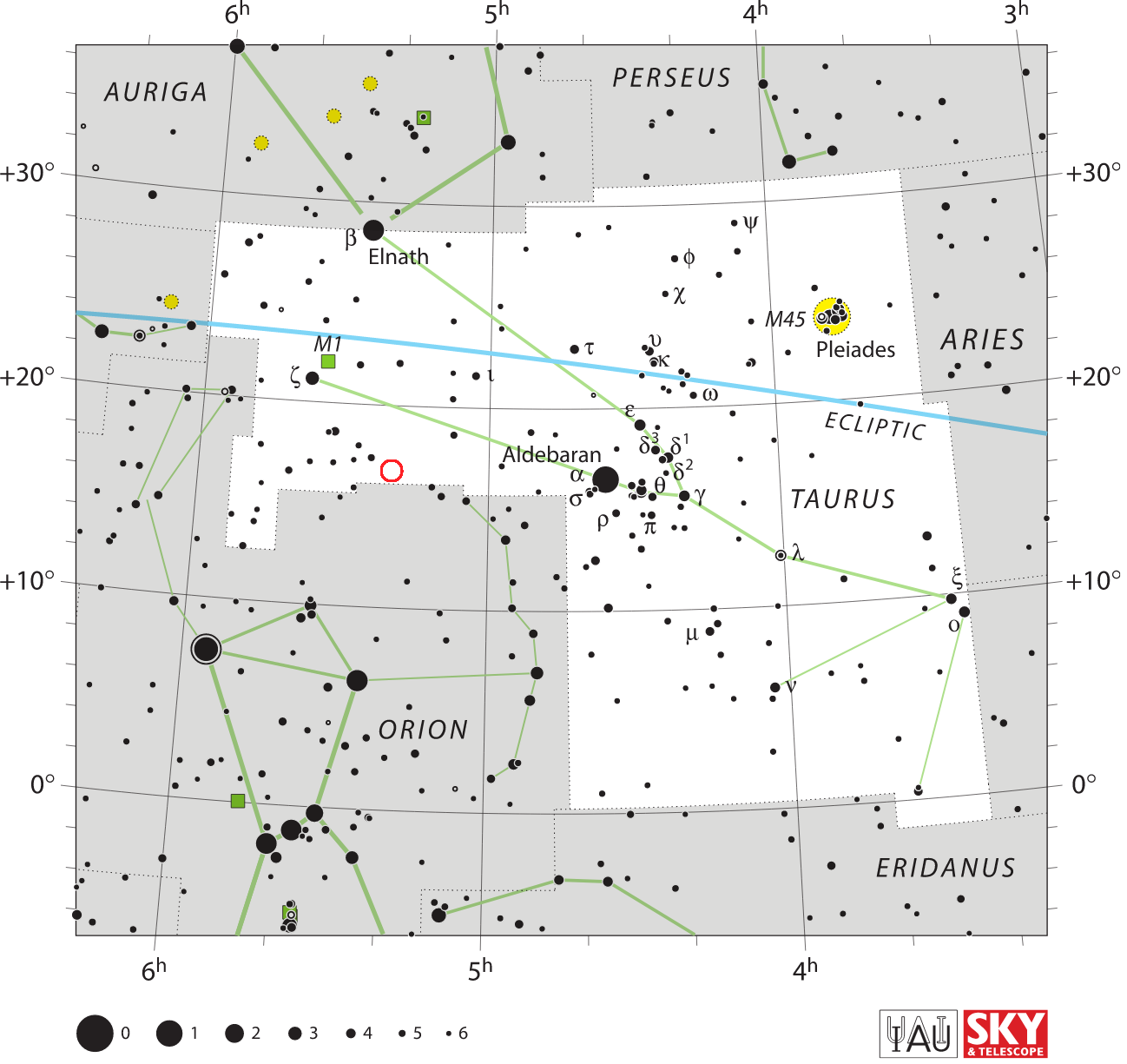
- Location of XX Tauri (circled in red)

Observation data Epoch J2000.0 Equinox ICRS
- Constellation: Taurus
- Right ascension: 05^{h} 19^{m} 24.467^{s}
- Declination: +16° 43′ 01.02″
- Apparent magnitude (V): 5.9p — 18.5p

Astrometry
Distance	3500 pc

Characteristics
- Variable type: nova

Other designations
- Nova Tau 1927, AAVSO 0513+16

Database references
SIMBAD	data

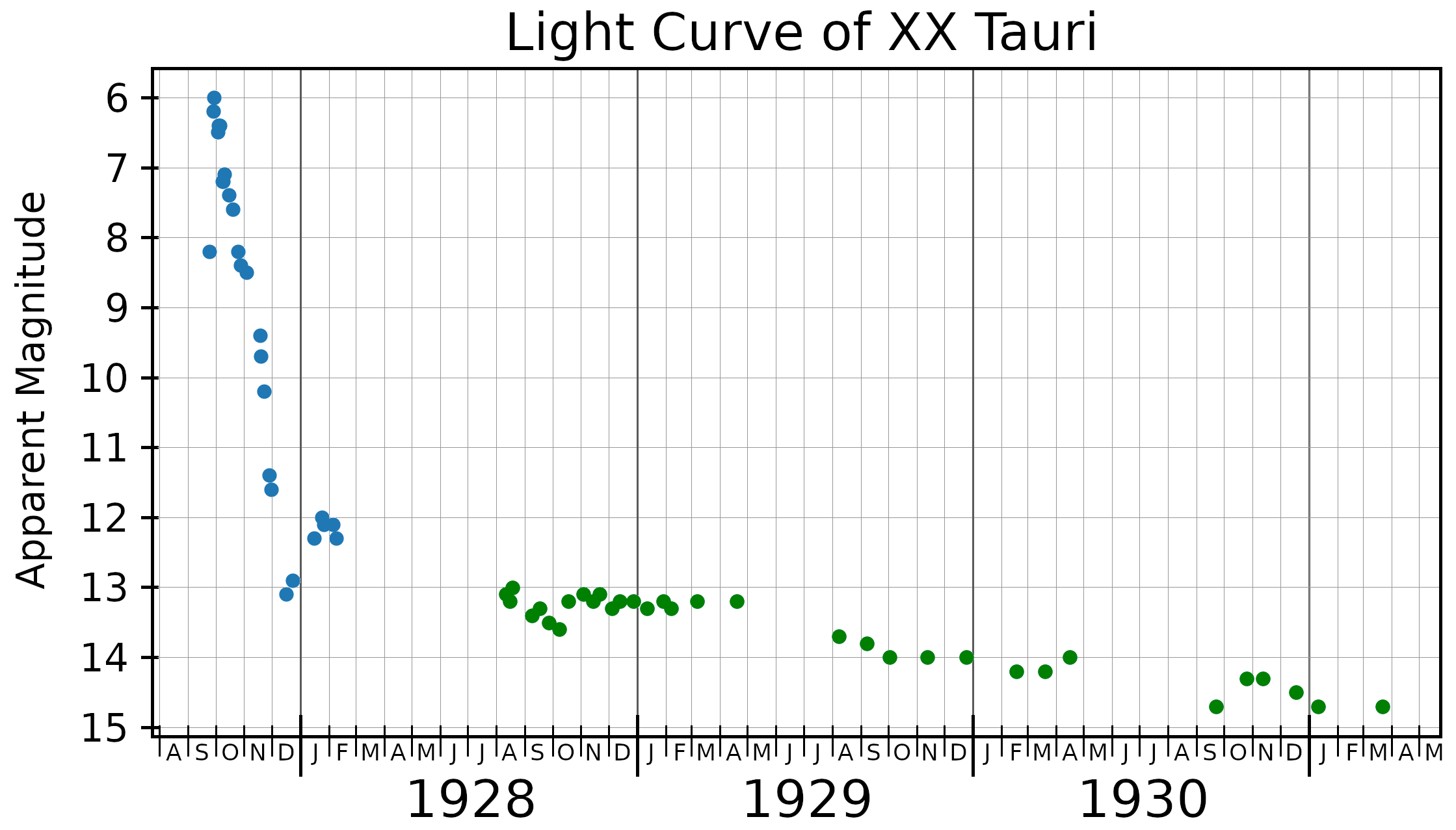
The light curve of XX Tauri, plotted from Harvard plate data, (shown in blue) and AAVSO data (shown in green).

XX Tauri (Nova Tauri 1927) was a nova, which appeared in the constellation Taurus in 1927. It was discovered by Arnold Schwassmann and Arno Arthur Wachmann at Hamburg Observatory on an objective prism photographic plate taken on 18 November 1927. Subsequent examination of pre-discovery photographic plates taken at the Harvard College Observatory showed that the peak brightness, magnitude 5.9, occurred on 1 October 1927, at which point it may have been faintly visible to the naked eye. By 1988 it had faded below magnitude 19.8.

XX Tauri faded three magnitudes from peak brightness in just 43 days, making it a "fast nova". Its post eruption light curve shows small amplitude (~0.1 magnitude) variations of timescales of days, hours and minutes, which makes the determination of the orbital period of the binary system comprising the nova difficult. The orbital period may be 0.136±0.002 days.

In 1984 a small (radius 2.2 arc second) nova remnant surrounding XX Tau was discovered using the Hale Telescope. The expansion of that remnant has been used to derive a distance estimate of 3500 parsecs.
