= Delphos, Ohio =

City in Ohio, US

- City
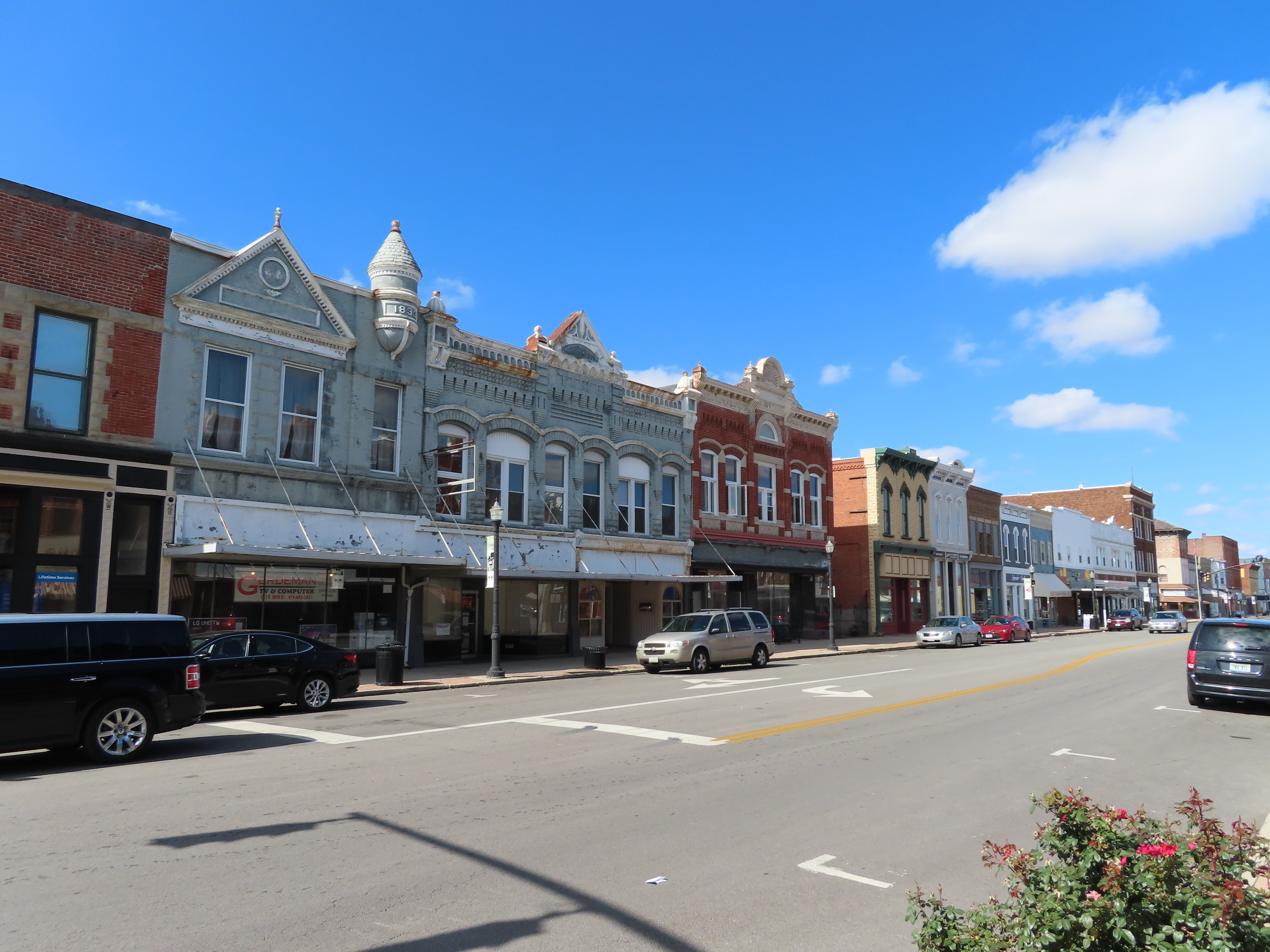
- North Main Street in Delphos

- Flag Seal
- Motto: "America's Friendliest City"
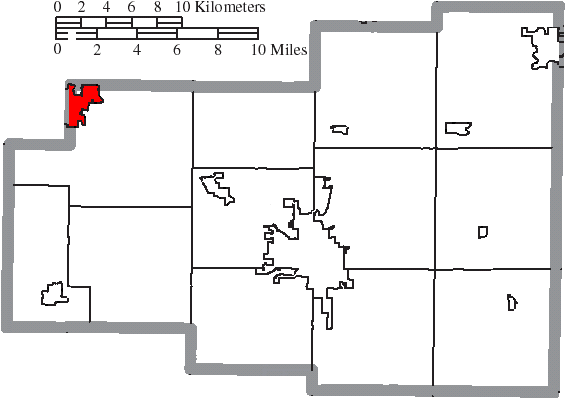
- Location of Delphos in Allen County

- Location within Ohio Location within the United States
- Coordinates: 40°51′40″N 84°21′00″W
- Country: United States
- State: Ohio
- Counties: Allen, Van Wert
- Townships: Marion, Washington
- Established in: 1836-1842

Government
  - Type: Mayor–council

Area
  - Total: 3.37 sq mi (8.72 km^{2})
  - Land: 3.32 sq mi (8.60 km^{2})
  - Water: 0.046 sq mi (0.12 km^{2})
- Elevation: 768 ft (234 m)

Population (2020)
  - Total: 7,117
  - Estimate (2023): 7,061
  - Density: 2,142.3/sq mi (827.16/km^{2})
- Time zone: UTC-5 (Eastern (EST))
  - Summer (DST): UTC-4 (EDT)
- ZIP code: 45833
- Area code: 419
- FIPS code: 39-21602
- GNIS feature ID: 2394508
- Website: www.cityofdelphos.com

Delphos is a city in Allen and Van Wert counties in the U.S. state of Ohio approximately 14 mi (23 km) northwest of Lima and 13 mi (21 km) east of Van Wert. The population was 7,117 at the 2020 census.

The Allen County portion of Delphos is part of the Lima, Ohio metropolitan area, while the Van Wert County portion is part of the Lima–Van Wert–Wapakoneta, OH, combined statistical area.

== History ==
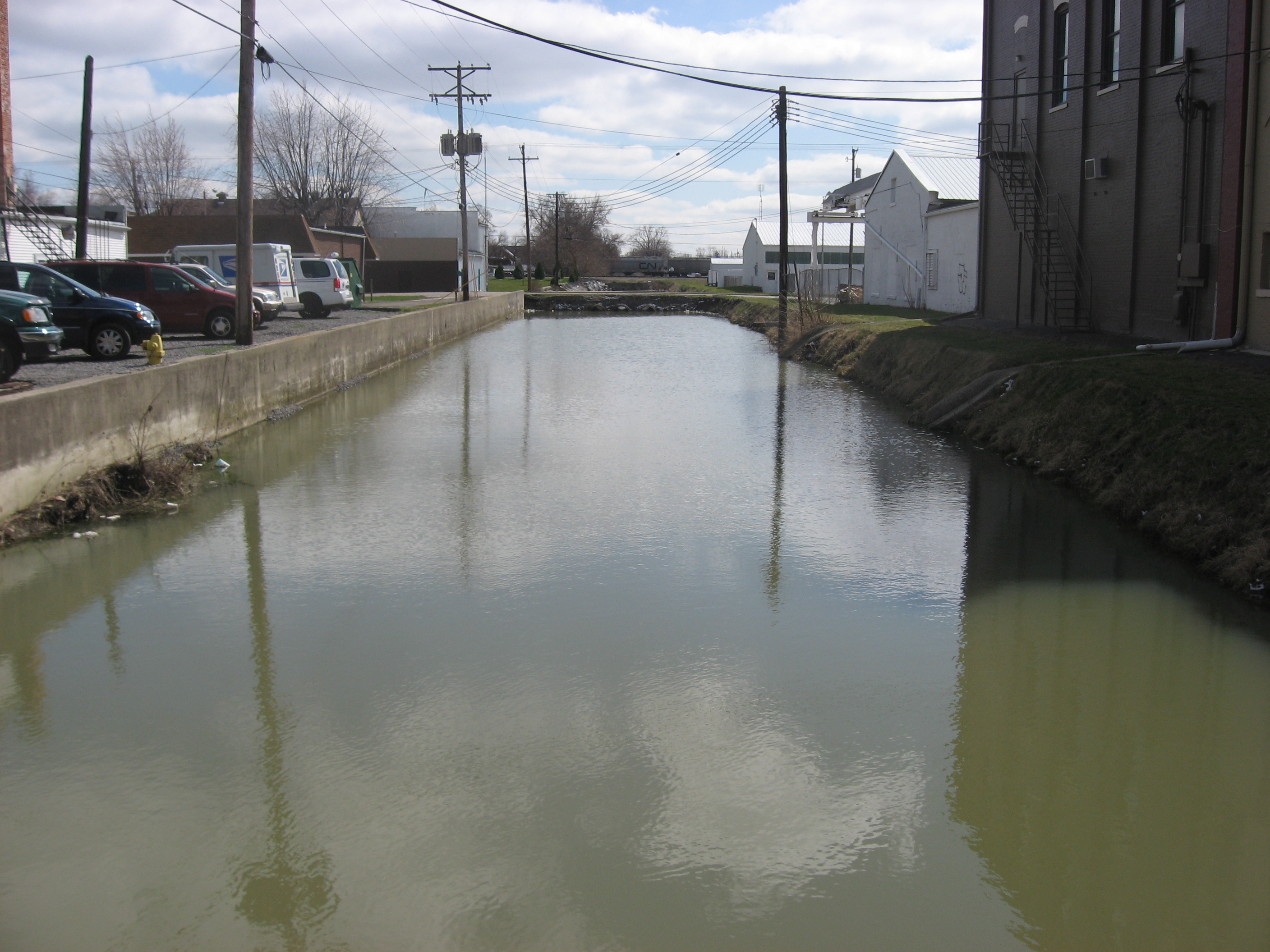
Remaining section of the Erie and Miami Canal in downtown Delphos

Delphos had its start in the early 1850s with the merger of neighboring rival towns. These were the towns of Howard (in the northwest), Section 10 (in the east), Bredeick Street (south of Howard) and East Bredeick (named after Father John Otto Bredeick, a priest from Verl, Germany, who had purchased the tract of land in 1840). In 1851, the four towns agreed to form a single town called Delphos. The city's name is derived from the Greek god Delphus.

The Miami and Erie Canal, a 274-mile (441-km) canal connecting Cincinnati to Toledo, ran through Delphos. The first settlers to Delphos were mainly construction workers attracted by the work being done on the Canal. After 20 years of construction, the Canal was completed—an inaugural canal boat carrying the governor of Ohio passed through Delphos on July 4, 1845.

The Canal was crucial to the economic development of the city in the 19th century, since it positioned Delphos as a center of regional trade. Indeed, Delphos became one of the major ports along the Canal, with transshipment facilities linking the Canal to the growing rail network in the region. Industrialists were also attracted by the Canal. By 1879, more than 100 factories located in Delphos produced goods for national and international trade. However, rail transport eventually came to dominate long-haul commercial transport and Delphos' importance as a hub of commerce waned.

Three Delphos buildings are listed on the National Register of Historic Places: the Marks-Family House and St. John's Catholic Church on the Allen County side of the city, and the Bredeick-Lang House on the Van Wert County side (see Gallery below).

== Geography ==
According to the United States Census Bureau, the city has a total area of 3.48 square miles (9.01 km^{2}), of which 3.44 square miles (8.91 km^{2}) is land and 0.04 square miles (0.10 km^{2}) is water.

== Demographics ==
Historical population
| Census | Pop. | Note | %± |
|---|---|---|---|
| 1850 | 374 | | — |
| 1860 | 425 | | 13.6% |
| 1870 | 1,667 | | 292.2% |
| 1880 | 3,814 | | 128.8% |
| 1890 | 4,516 | | 18.4% |
| 1900 | 4,517 | | 0.0% |
| 1910 | 5,038 | | 11.5% |
| 1920 | 5,745 | | 14.0% |
| 1930 | 5,672 | | −1.3% |
| 1940 | 5,746 | | 1.3% |
| 1950 | 6,220 | | 8.2% |
| 1960 | 6,961 | | 11.9% |
| 1970 | 7,608 | | 9.3% |
| 1980 | 7,314 | | −3.9% |
| 1990 | 7,093 | | −3.0% |
| 2000 | 6,944 | | −2.1% |
| 2010 | 7,101 | | 2.3% |
| 2020 | 7,117 | | 0.2% |
| 2023 (est.) | 7,061 | | −0.8% |

=== 2020 census ===
As of the 2020 census, Delphos had a population of 7,117. The median age was 39.6 years. 23.2% of residents were under the age of 18 and 20.0% of residents were 65 years of age or older. For every 100 females there were 98.5 males, and for every 100 females age 18 and over there were 98.2 males age 18 and over.

99.8% of residents lived in urban areas, while 0.2% lived in rural areas.

There were 2,957 households in Delphos, of which 27.4% had children under the age of 18 living in them. Of all households, 44.8% were married-couple households, 21.9% were households with a male householder and no spouse or partner present, and 26.2% were households with a female householder and no spouse or partner present. About 32.5% of all households were made up of individuals and 15.2% had someone living alone who was 65 years of age or older.

There were 3,196 housing units, of which 7.5% were vacant. The homeowner vacancy rate was 2.5% and the rental vacancy rate was 9.8%.

Racial composition as of the 2020 census
| Race | Number | Percent |
|---|---|---|
| White | 6,531 | 91.8% |
| Black or African American | 45 | 0.6% |
| American Indian and Alaska Native | 15 | 0.2% |
| Asian | 15 | 0.2% |
| Native Hawaiian and Other Pacific Islander | 0 | 0.0% |
| Some other race | 154 | 2.2% |
| Two or more races | 357 | 5.0% |
| Hispanic or Latino (of any race) | 329 | 4.6% |

=== 2010 census ===
As of the census of 2010, there were 7,101 people, 2,893 households, and 1,865 families living in the city. The population density was 2,064.2 inhabitants per square mile (797.0/km^{2}). There were 3,137 housing units at an average density of 911.9 per square mile (352.1/km^{2}). The racial makeup of the city was 97.5% White, 0.4% African American, 0.2% Native American, 0.2% Asian, 0.4% from other races, and 1.3% from two or more races. Hispanic or Latino of any race were 1.8% of the population.

There were 2,893 households, of which 31.2% had children under the age of 18 living with them, 48.3% were married couples living together, 11.0% had a female householder with no husband present, 5.2% had a male householder with no wife present, and 35.5% were non-families. 29.9% of all households were made up of individuals, and 13.8% had someone living alone who was 65 years of age or older. The average household size was 2.41 and the average family size was 3.00.

The median age in the city was 38.6 years. 24.6% of residents were under the age of 18; 8.8% were between the ages of 18 and 24; 23.8% were from 25 to 44; 25.5% were from 45 to 64; and 17.1% were 65 years of age or older. The gender makeup of the city was 48.6% male and 51.4% female.

=== 2000 census ===
As of the census of 2000, there were 6,944 people, 2,717 households, and 1,880 families living in the city. The population density was 2,391.9 inhabitants per square mile (923.5/km^{2}). There were 2,906 housing units at an average density of 1,001.0 per square mile (386.5/km^{2}). The racial makeup of the city was 98.63% White, 0.27% African American, 0.14% Native American, 0.19% Asian, 0.24% from other races, and 0.52% from two or more races. Hispanic or Latino of any race were 0.76% of the population.

There were 2,717 households, out of which 33.8% had children under the age of 18 living with them, 55.2% were married couples living together, 9.9% had a female householder with no husband present, and 30.8% were non-families. 27.2% of all households were made up of individuals, and 13.8% had someone living alone who was 65 years of age or older. The average household size was 2.52 and the average family size was 3.08.

In the city, the population was spread out, with 26.8% under the age of 18, 9.6% from 18 to 24, 27.6% from 25 to 44, 19.6% from 45 to 64, and 16.4% who were 65 years of age or older. The median age was 36 years. For every 100 females, there were 95.9 males. For every 100 females age 18 and over, there were 88.6 males.

The median income for a household in the city was $35,817, and the median income for a family was $44,385. Males had a median income of $32,917 versus $21,124 for females. The per capita income for the city was $16,380. About 5.6% of families and 6.8% of the population were below the poverty line, including 7.5% of those under age 18 and 6.6% of those age 65 or over.

== Parks and recreation ==
Delphos City Parks include Stadium Park, Waterworks Park, Leisure Park, Garfield Park and Suever Park. Stadium Park is home to a football field where the Delphos Jefferson Wildcats and the St. Johns Blue Jays play. The Stadium was built in 1940 and has the capacity of 3900 people. Stadium Park also has multiple tennis courts, baseball fields, basketball courts, a playground, and eating area.

== Education ==
Delphos City Schools include Jefferson High School, Jefferson Middle School, Franklin Elementary School, and St Johns High School. Franklin Elementary is located in Allen County, and The Middle School (former High School) and the High School buildings are located in Van Wert County.

Delphos St. John's, the city's Roman Catholic High School, and St. John's Elementary school are both part of St. John's Catholic Church and the Roman Catholic Diocese of Toledo. Both the high school and elementary buildings are located in Allen County.

== Notable people ==
- Zane Grey – author
- Bill Lange – American football player
- Clara Chipman Newton – 19th century china painter
- Leslie Peltier – astronomer and prolific discoverer of comets and variable stars
- Sabrina Scharf – actress
- Thomas Weinandy – Catholic priest and theologian.

== Gallery: Delphos in the National Register of Historic Places ==
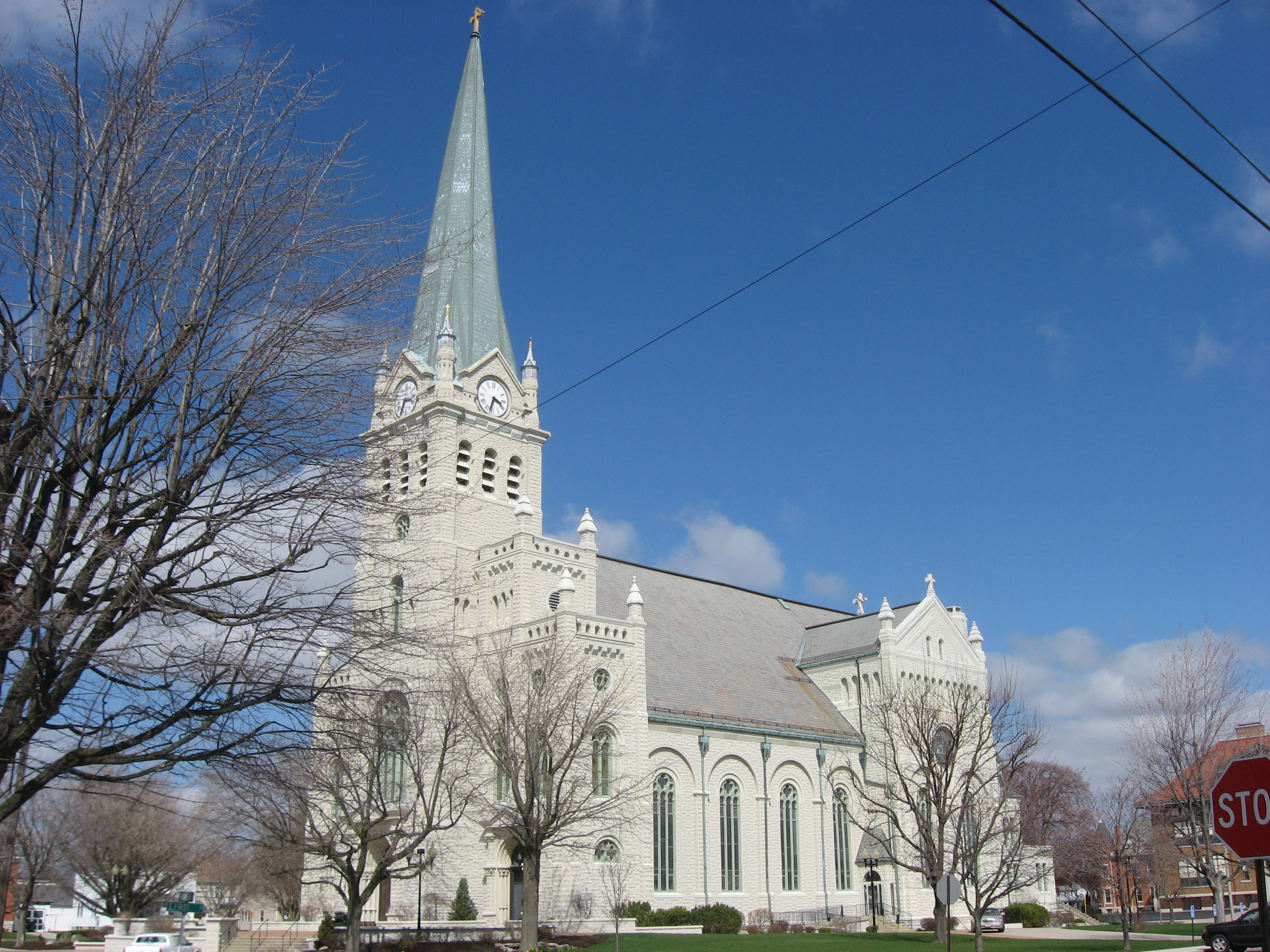
South side of Saint John’s Catholic Church

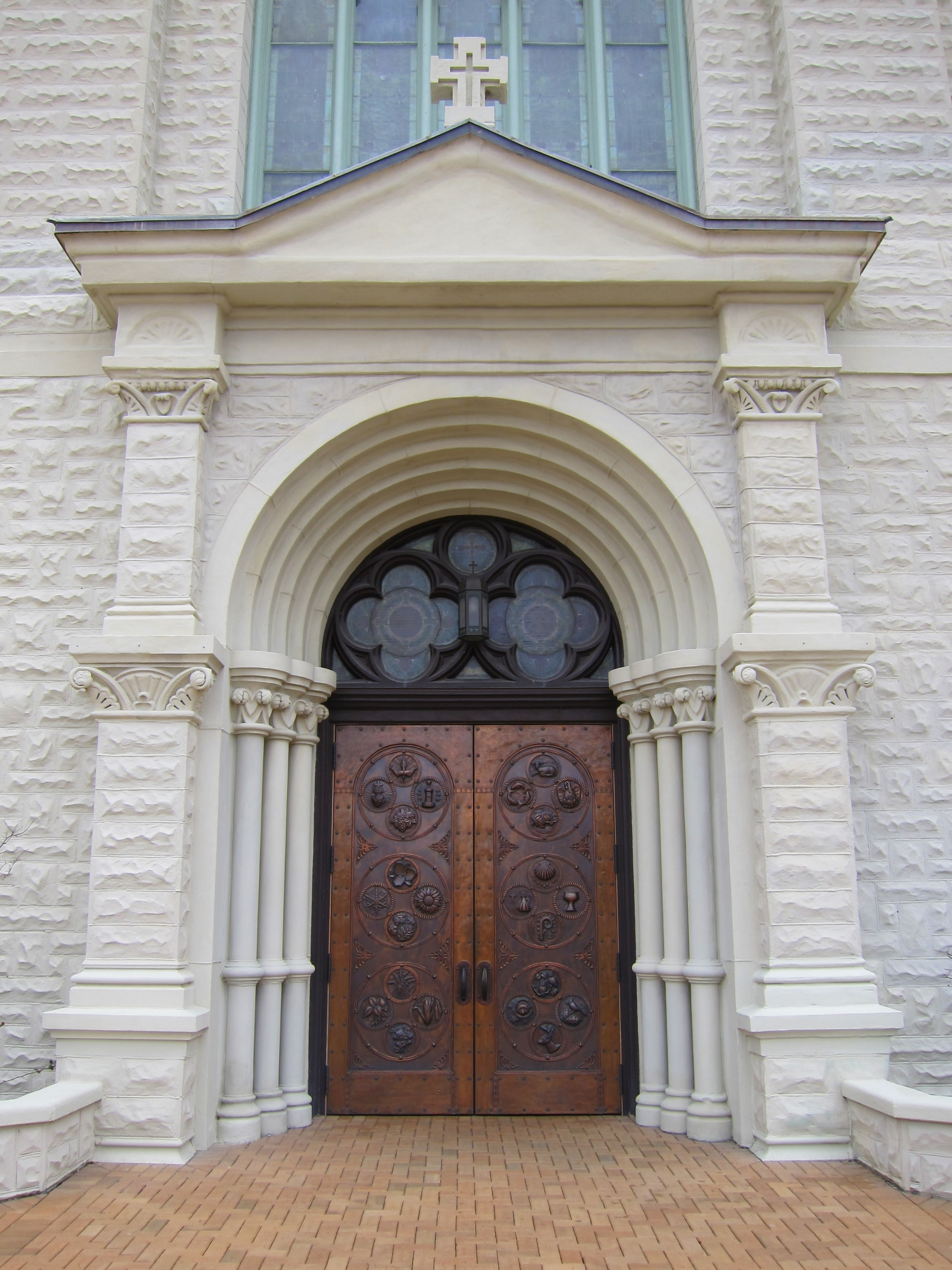
Entrance to Saint John’s Catholic Church

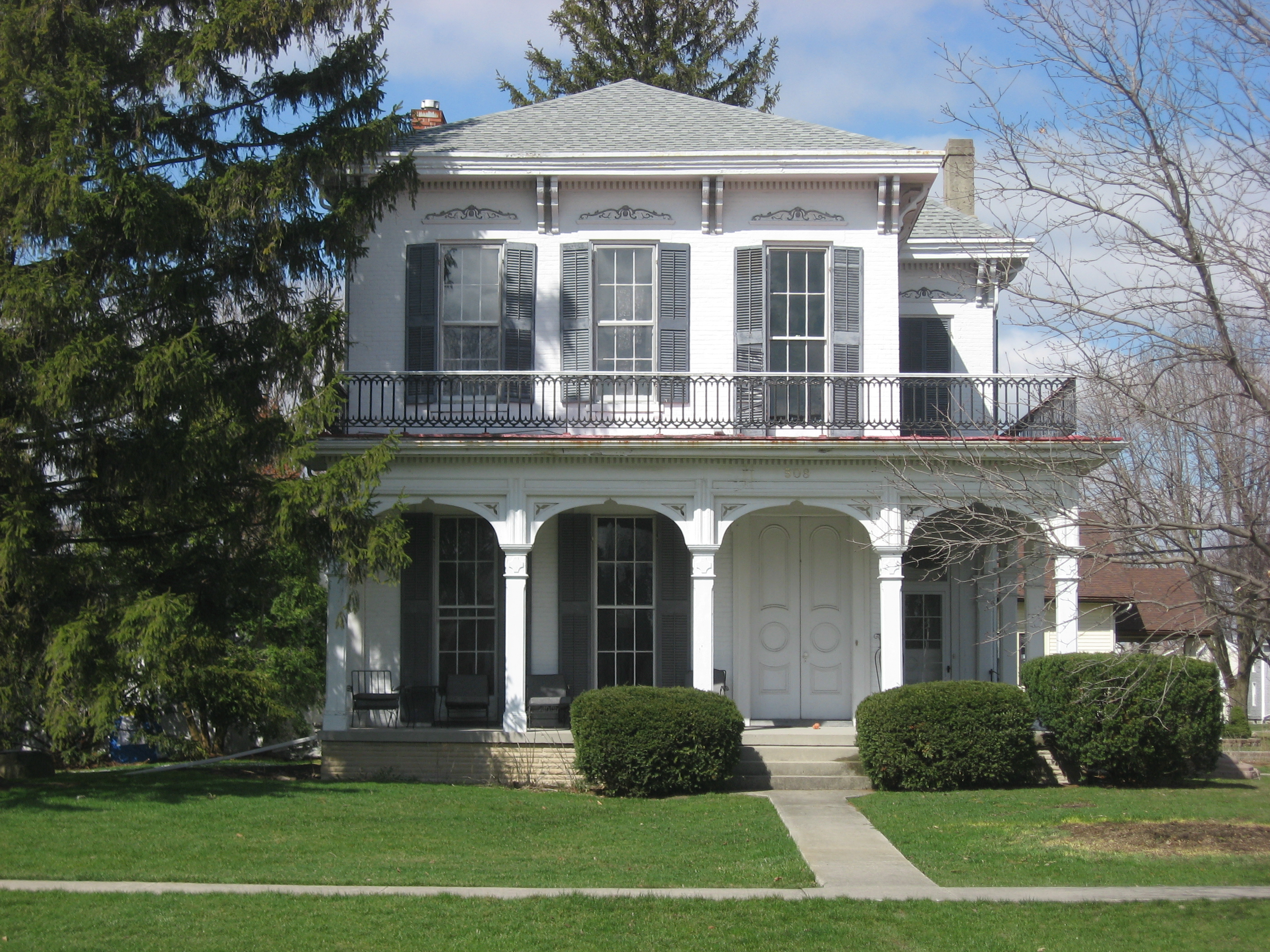
The Bredeick-Lang house, south side

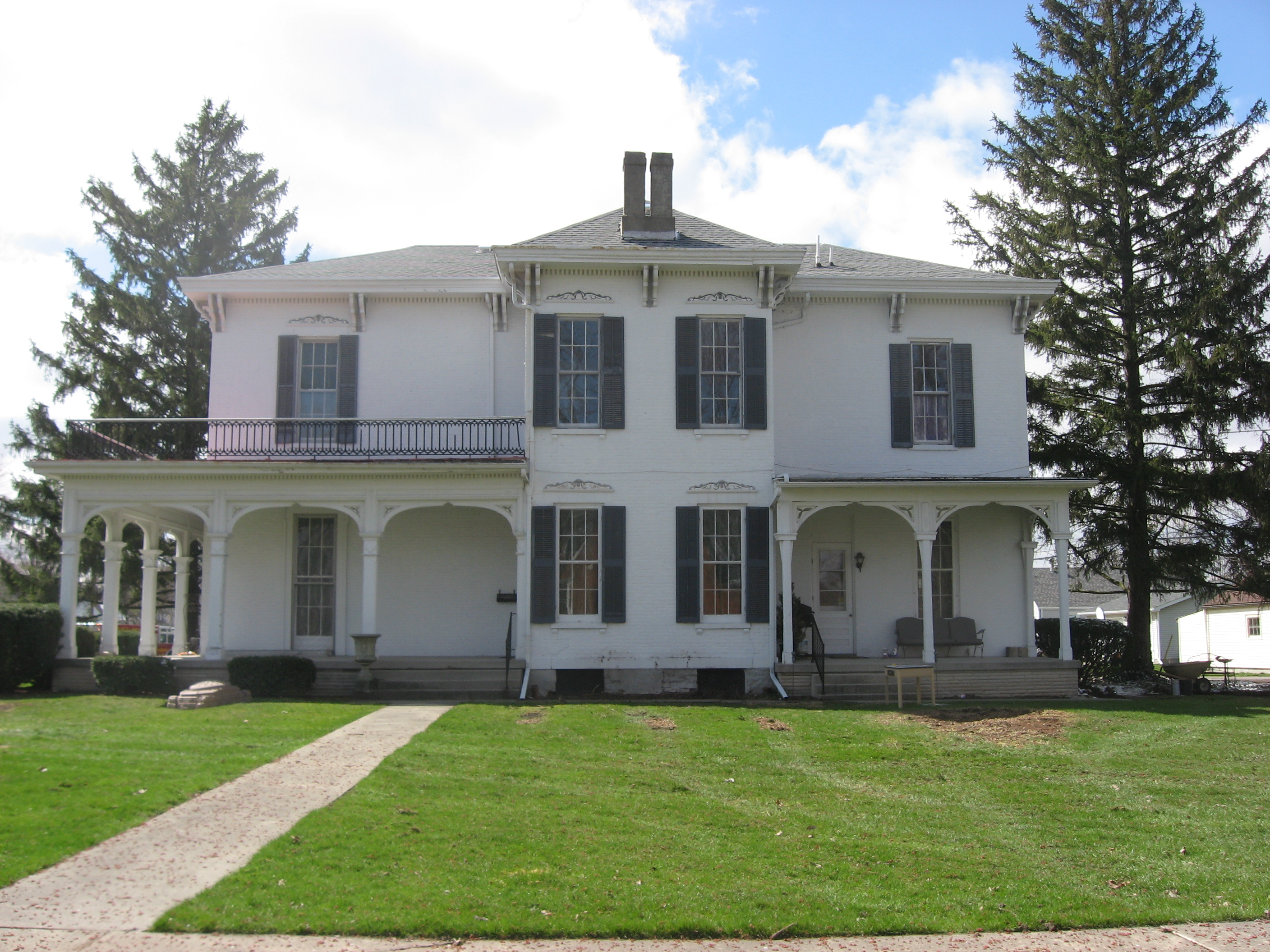
The Bredeick-Lang house, east side

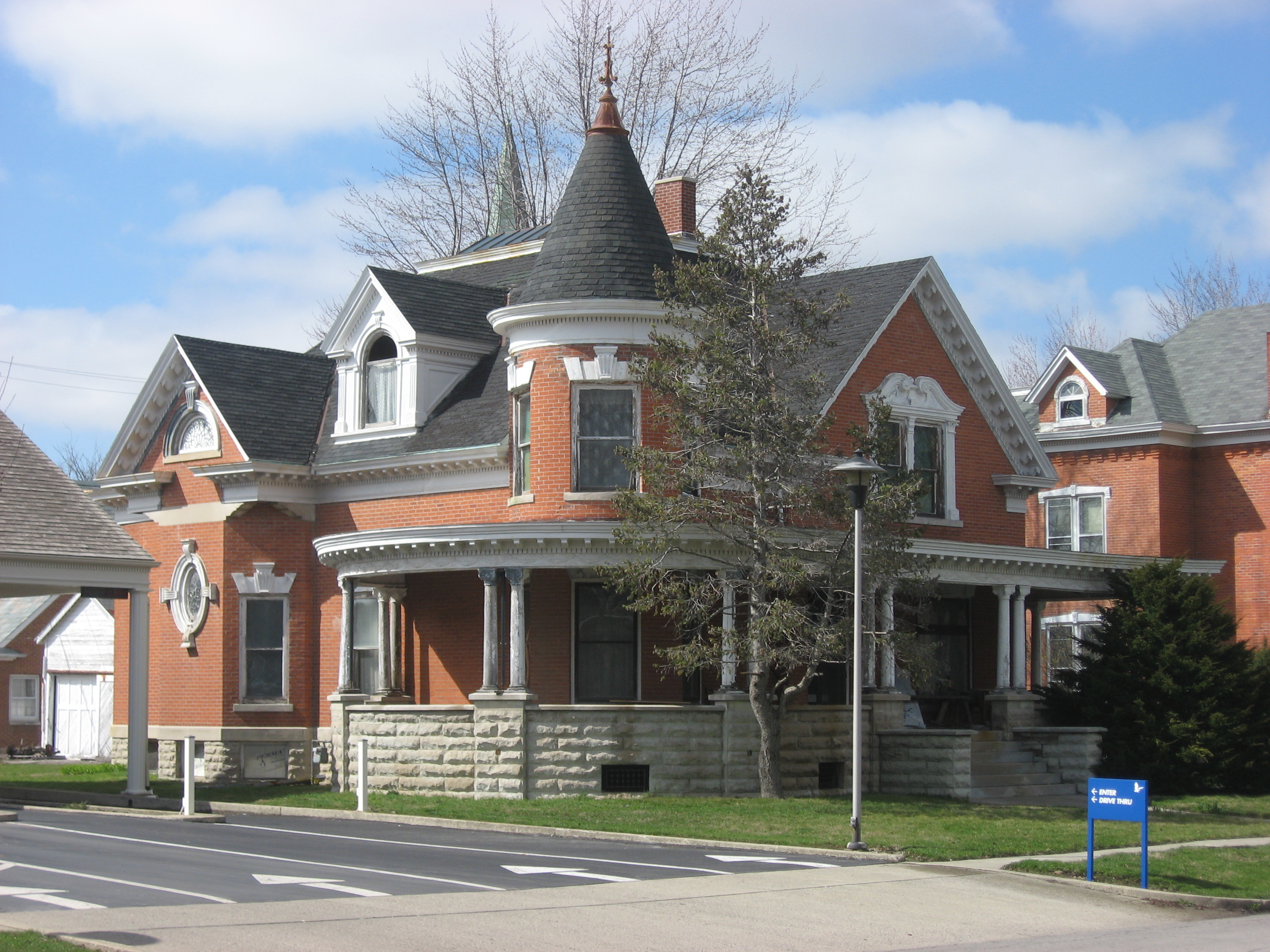
The Marks-Family house
