= St. John's Catholic Church (Delphos, Ohio) =

Historic church in Ohio, United States

- St. John Catholic Church
- U.S. National Register of Historic Places
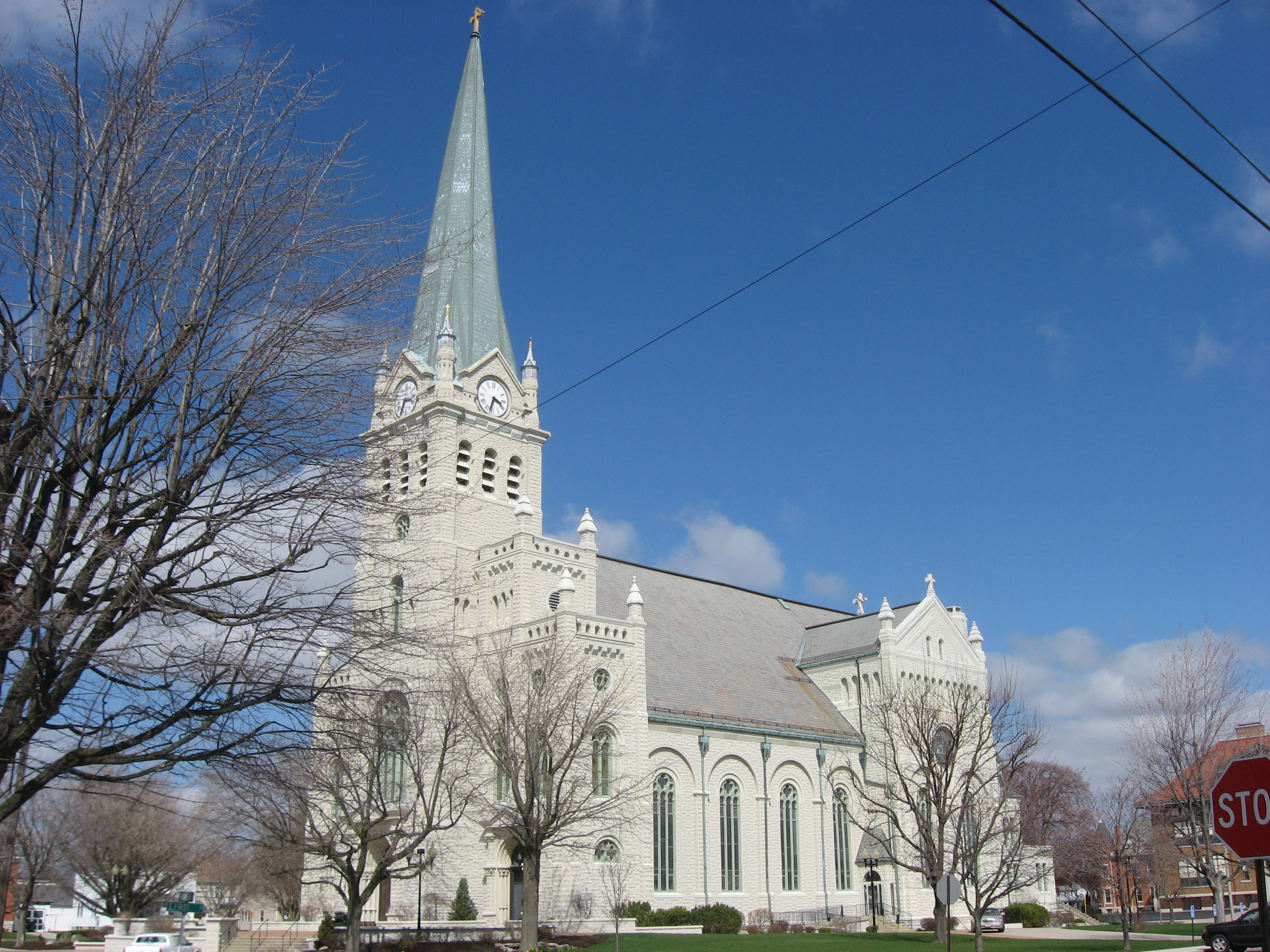
- Southern side and front of the church

- Location within Ohio Location within the United States
- Location: 110 N. Franklin St., Delphos, Ohio
- Coordinates: 40°50′35″N 84°20′10″W
- Area: 2.5 acres (1.0 ha)
- Built: 1880
- Architect: S.W. Lane
- Architectural style: Romanesque Revival
- NRHP reference No.: 80002933
- Added to NRHP: January 3, 1980

St. John's Catholic Church is a historic Roman Catholic church of the Diocese of Toledo on the Allen County side of Delphos, Ohio, United States. Designed by S.W. Lane, it has been recognized as a historic site because of its architecture.

== Parish history ==
St. John's Parish was established in 1842 by German Catholic settlers who had immigrated from Osnabrück. Although the church was afflicted by a cholera epidemic in 1854, it grew to the point that it was split into two parishes, with the members in Landeck being erected into a separate parish. Land was donated for the construction of the present church building by Frederick Bredeick; construction began in 1879 and concluded in the following year. As the village of Delphos grew with the Miami and Erie Canal, the parish's prosperity likewise increased; like St. Michael's Catholic Church in Shelby County to the south, the church's architecture demonstrates the wealth that came from the commerce along the canal.

== Architecture ==
=== Interior ===
Leading features of the church's interior include a prominent rib vault, two rows of columns in the nave that are topped with Corinthian capitals, and an altar built to resemble that of Rome's Basilica di San Clemente.

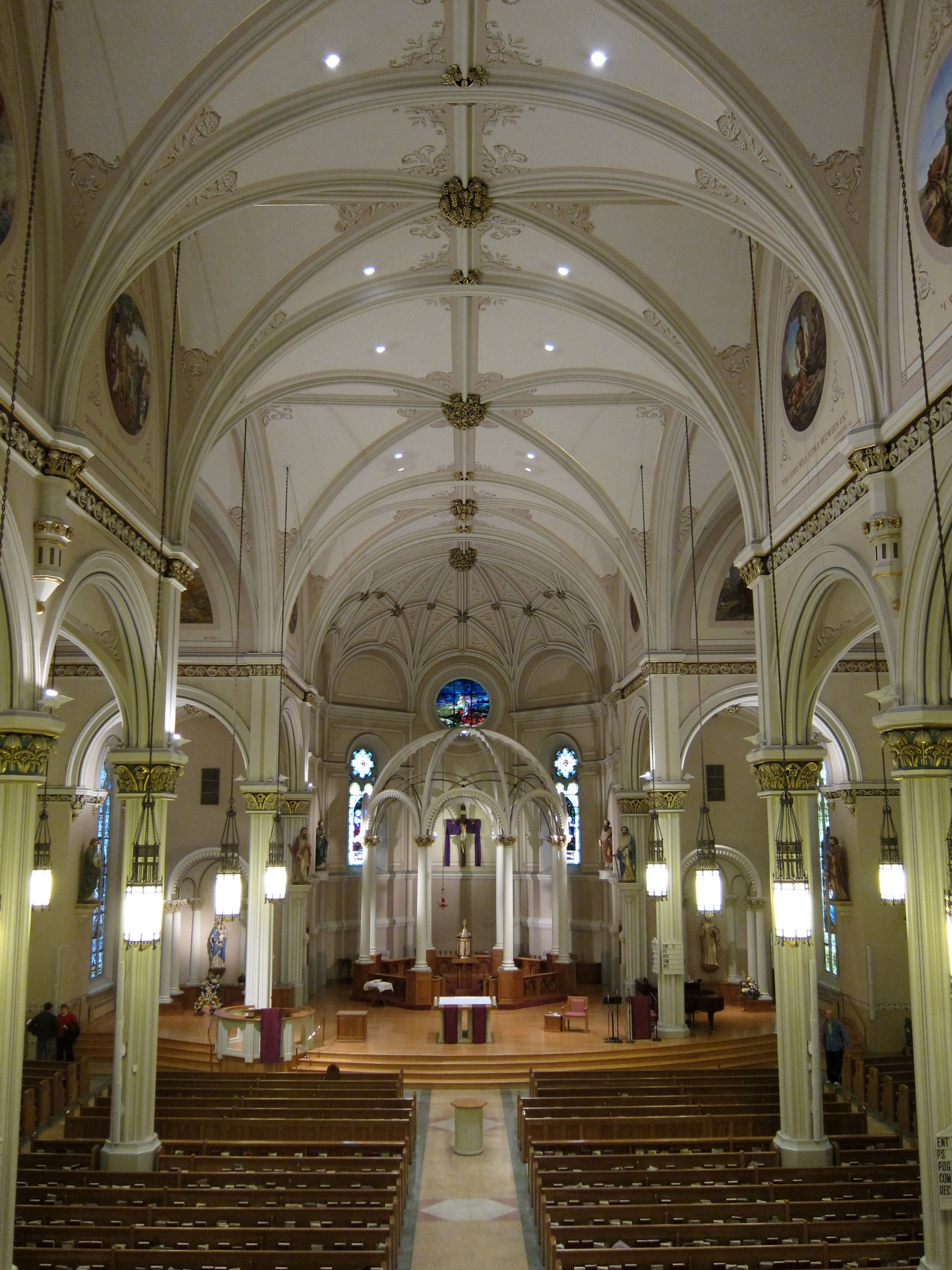
Church interior with Lenten decoration

Architectural experts have deemed the interior unmatched in western Ohio.

=== Exterior ===
Outside, the church's exterior is also striking. Although many large Catholic churches are located in western Ohio, they are more typically built in the Gothic Revival style – several counties in far western Ohio have been nicknamed the "Land of the Cross-Tipped Churches" because of the dominance of Gothic Revival churches in the region – and such a large Romanesque Revival church is unique. It fills an entire city block, and its tower is by far the most prominent part of the community's skyline; accordingly, it has been likened to a cathedral.

== Recognition ==
In 1980, St. John's Church was listed on the National Register of Historic Places because of its architectural significance. It is the only church on the National Register in Allen County, and one of three buildings in Delphos so to be recognized.
