= Leslie Peltier =

American astronomer

Leslie C. Peltier
- Born: Leslie Copus Peltier; January 2, 1900; Delphos, Ohio, U.S.
- Died: May 10, 1980 (aged 80); Delphos, Ohio, U.S.
- Spouse: Dorothy 'Dottie' Nihiser

Leslie Copus Peltier (January 2, 1900 – May 10, 1980) was an American amateur astronomer and discoverer of several comets and novae, including Nova Herculis 1963. He was once described as "the world's greatest non-professional astronomer" by Harlow Shapley.

== Biography ==
Leslie Copus Peltier was born in Delphos, Ohio. Delphos is located in northwestern Ohio in both Van Wert and Allen County. His homeplace was located on South Bredeick Street, and his home is still standing today. The home was known as Brookhaven. Peltier married Dorothy Nihiser in November 1933. An amateur astronomer, he was a prolific discoverer of comets and also a persistent observer of variable stars and member of the AAVSO. He was co-discoverer of 12 comets, 10 of which carry his name, and over a span of more than 60 years made more than 132,000 variable star observations.

He wrote the autobiographical Starlight Nights (ISBN 0-933346-94-8), which evokes the magic of stargazing in simpler days, on a farm and without light pollution.

Main-belt asteroid 3850 Peltier is named in his honor, as is the Leslie C. Peltier Award of the Astronomical League.

== Publications ==
Peltier authored the following books:

- Starlight Nights: The Adventures of a Star-Gazer (1965); also published in Japanese as Hoshi No Kuru Yoru (1985)
- Guideposts to the Stars: Exploring the Skies Throughout the Year (1972); also published in Dutch as Spectrum Sterrengids (1976) and as Prisma Sterrengids (1979)
- The Place on Jennings Creek (1977)
- Leslie Peltier's Guide to the Stars (1986)
- The Binocular Stargazer: A Beginner's Guide to Exploring the Sky (1995)
