= National Register of Historic Places listings in Allen County, Ohio =

Location of Allen County in Ohio

This is a list of the National Register of Historic Places listings in Allen County, Ohio.

This is intended to be a complete list of the properties and districts on the National Register of Historic Places in Allen County, Ohio, United States. The locations of National Register properties and districts for which the latitude and longitude coordinates are included below, may be seen in an online map.

There are 31 properties and districts listed on the National Register in the county, including 1 National Historic Landmark. Another 2 properties were once listed but have been removed.

This National Park Service list is complete through NPS recent listings posted March 14, 2025.

== Current listings ==
	Name on the Register	Image	Date listed	Location	City or town	Description
1	Adgate Block	Adgate Block	October 7, 1982 (#82001347)	300-306 S. Main St. 40°44′13″N 84°06′20″W	Lima	A business block, now demolished and replaced with a YMCA
2	Allen County Courthouse	Allen County Courthouse	July 24, 1974 (#74001392)	Courthouse Sq. 40°44′34″N 84°06′20″W	Lima	Large Second Empire-style courthouse
3	Armory-Latisona Building	Armory-Latisona Building	October 7, 1982 (#82001348)	440 S. Main St. 40°44′06″N 84°06′19″W	Lima	An armory, converted for civilian purposes
4	Barr Hotel	Barr Hotel	May 15, 1986 (#86001053)	201-209 E. High and 200-218 N. Union Sts. 40°44′16″N 84°06′11″W	Lima	A two-part building from Lima's golden years
5	Griffith Breese Farm	Griffith Breese Farm	January 11, 1983 (#83001942)	2875 Fort Amanda Rd., southwest of Lima; 40°42′18″N 84°09′20″W	Shawnee Township	An old farmstead, home to one of the area's first settlers
6	Beck and R.C. Cahill Buildings	Beck and R.C. Cahill Buildings	October 7, 1982 (#82001349)	200-206 S. Main St. 40°44′19″N 84°06′19″W	Lima	A business block, now demolished and replaced with a parking lot
7	Dorsey Building	Dorsey Building	October 7, 1982 (#82001350)	208 S. Main St. 40°44′16″N 84°06′20″W	Lima	An elaborate stone building, now demolished and replaced with a parking lot.
8	Elks Lodge	Elks Lodge	October 7, 1982 (#82001865)	138 W. North St. 40°44′35″N 84°06′23″W	Lima	Built for an Elks lodge; now a church
9	First National Bank and Trust Building	First National Bank and Trust Building	October 7, 1982 (#82001351)	43-53 Public Sq. 40°44′24″N 84°06′20″W	Lima	One of the tallest downtown buildings, constructed shortly before the end of Lima's golden age
10	Hotel Argonne	Hotel Argonne	October 7, 1982 (#82001352)	201 N. Elizabeth St. 40°44′29″N 84°06′25″W	Lima	A ten-story DeCurtins design named for the Meuse-Argonne Offensive
11	Klaus Block	Klaus Block	October 7, 1982 (#82001864)	401-405 N. Main St. 40°44′39″N 84°06′19″W	Lima	A commercial block; home to the same business since 1870
12	Lima Cleaning and Pressing Company	Lima Cleaning and Pressing Company	October 7, 1982 (#82001353)	436-438 S. Main St. 40°44′07″N 84°06′19″W	Lima	A former laundry building; one of the few historic properties in a decaying neighborhood
13	Lima Memorial Hall	Lima Memorial Hall	May 7, 1979 (#79001779)	W. Elm and S. Elizabeth Sts. 40°44′15″N 84°06′23″W	Lima	Community center and performance hall
14	Lima Pennsylvania Railroad Passenger Depot	Lima Pennsylvania Railroad Passenger Depot	August 21, 2003 (#03000805)	424 N. Central Ave. 40°44′42″N 84°06′07″W	Lima	A Pennsylvania Railroad station, now used by the city government
15	Lima Stadium	Lima Stadium	March 21, 2002 (#02000219)	100 S. Calument Ave. and E. Market St. 40°44′23″N 84°05′32″W	Lima	Football stadium for Lima Senior High School
16	Linneman Building	Linneman Building	October 7, 1982 (#82001867)	210-212 S. Main St. 40°44′15″N 84°06′20″W	Lima	A business block, now demolished and replaced with a parking lot
17	MacDonell House	MacDonell House	September 20, 1978 (#78001999)	632 W. Market St. 40°44′25″N 84°06′58″W	Lima	Home to the Allen County Museum
18	Marks-Family House	Marks-Family House	April 1, 1982 (#82003537)	233 N. Franklin St. 40°50′39″N 84°20′14″W	Delphos	A well-preserved Queen Anne residence
19	Martin Block and Kibby Block	Martin Block and Kibby Block	October 7, 1982 (#82001868)	140-146 S. Main St. 40°44′19″N 84°06′19″W	Lima	A pair of Gothic Revival commercial buildings
20	Metropolitan Block	Metropolitan Block	November 29, 1979 (#79001780)	300 N. Main St. 40°44′34″N 84°06′16″W	Lima	A turreted Romanesque Revival commercial building
21	Miami and Erie Canal Deep Cut	Miami and Erie Canal Deep Cut	October 15, 1966 (#66000603)	2 mi (3.2 km) south of Spencerville on State Route 66; 40°41′06″N 84°21′57″W	Spencer Township	A portion of the Miami and Erie Canal; workers dug fifty feet into a hillside instead of building locks over it. Extends into Salem Township in Auglaize County
22	Neal Clothing	Neal Clothing	October 7, 1982 (#82001870)	74 Public Sq. 40°44′26″N 84°06′17″W	Lima	The oldest building on Public Square
23	Neely-Sieber House	Neely-Sieber House	December 12, 1976 (#76001360)	620 W. Spring St. 40°44′19″N 84°06′52″W	Lima	Built for an oil baron and longtime home of a local businessman
24	Ohio Theatre	Ohio Theatre	October 7, 1982 (#82001866)	122 W. North St. 40°44′34″N 84°06′22″W	Lima	1920s Movie palace in the Churrigueresque style
25	Renz Block	Renz Block	October 7, 1982 (#82001354)	320 N. Main St. 40°44′36″N 84°06′18″W	Lima	A business block, now demolished and replaced with a parking lot
26	Round Barn	Round Barn	April 17, 1980 (#80002934)	Along East Rd., south of Elida; 40°46′26″N 84°11′25″W	American Township	
27	St. John Catholic Church	St. John Catholic Church	January 3, 1980 (#80002933)	110 N. Franklin St. 40°50′35″N 84°20′10″W	Delphos	Large Romanesque Revival church built for a wealthy, largely German parish
28	The J.M. Sealts Company Warehouse Building		March 1, 2021 (#100006179)	330 North Central Ave. 40°44′35″N 84°06′08″W	Lima	
29	U.S. Post Office	U.S. Post Office	October 7, 1982 (#82001356)	326 W. High St. 40°44′29″N 84°06′32″W	Lima	Neoclassical post office constructed at the beginning of the Great Depression
30	Union Block	Union Block	October 7, 1982 (#82001355)	28-38 Public Sq. 40°44′23″N 84°06′17″W	Lima	Prominent commercial block on Public Square
31	West Market Street Boulevard Historic District	West Market Street Boulevard Historic District	October 27, 2004 (#04001201)	1410-1529 W. Market St. 40°44′24″N 84°08′04″W	Lima	

== Former listings ==
	Name on the Register	Image	Date listed	Date removed	Location	City or town	Description
1	Round Barn		April 17, 1980 (#80002932)	May 5, 1983	Off U.S. Route 30, east of Delphos	Delphos	
2	Wheeler Building	Wheeler Building	Unavailable (#82001869)	July 12, 1985	131-135 W. Market Street; 40°44′23″N 84°06′23″W	Lima	

== See also ==
- List of National Historic Landmarks in Ohio
- Listings in neighboring counties: Auglaize, Hancock, Hardin, Putnam, Van Wert
- National Register of Historic Places listings in Ohio
