= Beck and R.C. Cahill Buildings =

- U.S. National Register of Historic Places
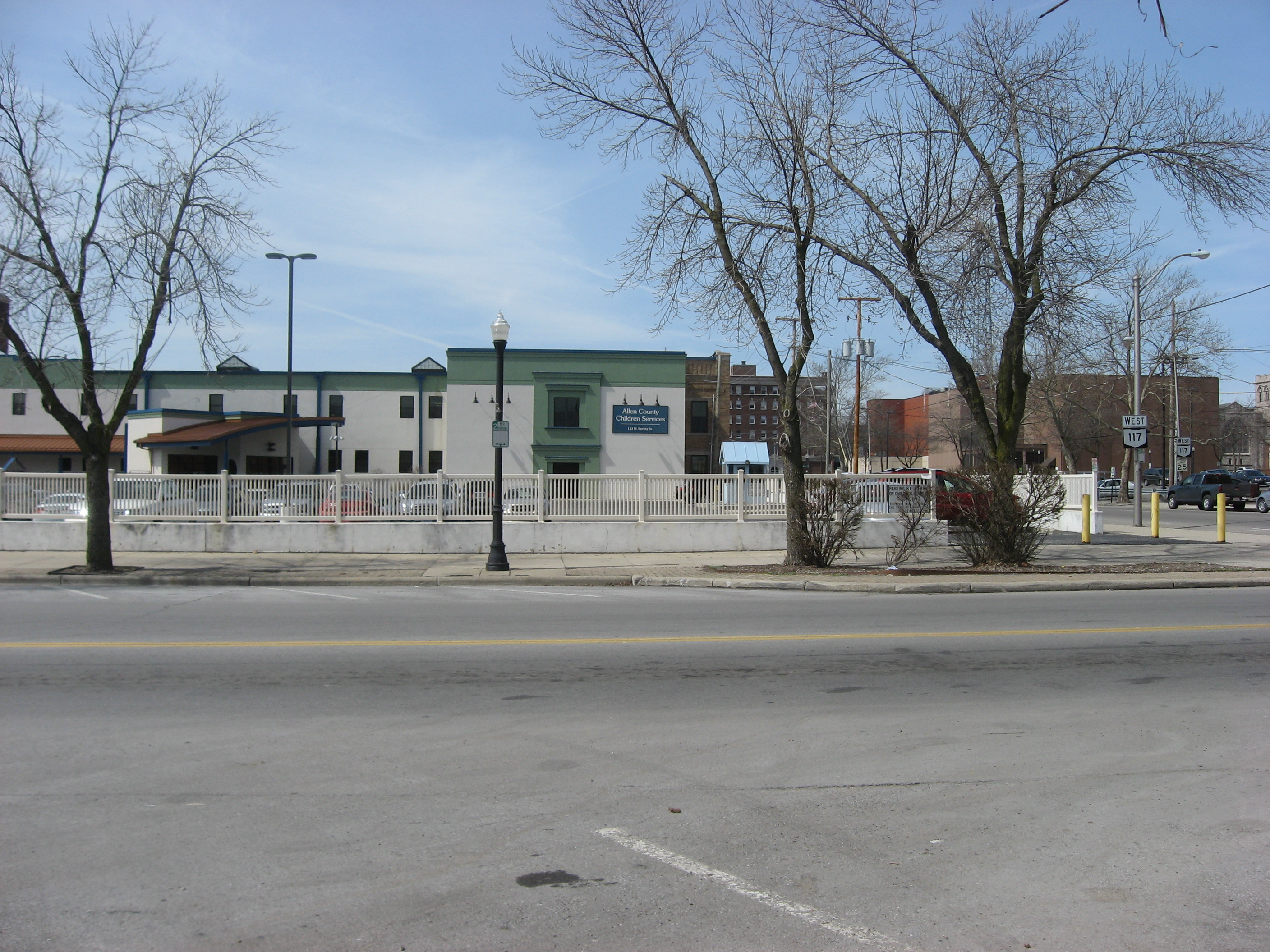
- Site of the building

- Location within Ohio Location within the United States
- Location: 200-206 S. Main St., Lima, Ohio
- Coordinates: 40°44′19″N 84°6′19″W
- Area: Less than 1 acre (0.40 ha)
- Built: 1890
- Architectural style: Late Victorian
- MPS: Lima MRA
- NRHP reference No.: 82001349
- Added to NRHP: October 7, 1982

The Beck and R.C. Cahill Buildings [sic] was a historic commercial building on the southern side of downtown Lima, Ohio, United States. Built in 1890 in a late version of the Victorian style, the building was located along Main Street south of the city's central square. It appears that the buildings no longer exist.

== Origins ==
Lima grew rapidly in the last years of the 19th century following the nearby discovery of petroleum in 1885. Many large commercial buildings were constructed in the city, including several on South Main Street such as the Martin and Kibby Blocks, the Dorsey Building, the Linneman Building, the Beck and Cahill Buildings, and the Adgate Block.

== Architecture ==
Three large bays composed the first front of the three-story building, which was built of yellow brick and covered with a pyramid-shaped slate roof. The upper floors of the square building comprised thirteen bays on two sides and seventeen bays on the others. Decorative elements on the exterior included pilasters of cast iron and limestone quoins and trimming. Into the 1970s, two of the original three storefronts remained essentially as they had been since the building was constructed.

== Recent history ==
In 1982, the Beck and R.C. Cahill Buildings was one of eighteen historic buildings in or near downtown Lima to be listed on the National Register of Historic Places. This collection, known as the "Lima Multiple Resource Area," embraced commercial and governmental buildings in the city constructed between 1860 and 1928. Among the other buildings included in the Multiple Resource Area were several on South Main Street, including the adjacent Linneman Building and Martin and Kibby Blocks.

Despite this recognition, the Beck and R.C. Cahill Buildings is no longer in existence: it has been torn down, and a parking lot now occupies its place.
