= Metropolitan Block =

Metropolitan Block may refer to:

- Metropolitan Block (Lima, Ohio), listed on the National Register of Historic Places in Allen County, Ohio
- Metropolitan Block (Lake Geneva, Wisconsin), listed on the National Register of Historic Places in Walworth County, Wisconsin
