= Adgate =

Adgate is a surname. People with this surname include:

- Andrew Adgate (died 1793), American musician and author
- Asa Adgate (1767–1832), American iron manufacturer and congressman
- Cary Adgate (born 1953), American skier
- Chester Adgate Congdon (1853–1916), American lawyer and businessman

== See also ==
- Adgate Block, a historic building in Lima, Ohio, United States
