= Dayton Memorial Hall =

- Memorial Hall
- U.S. National Register of Historic Places
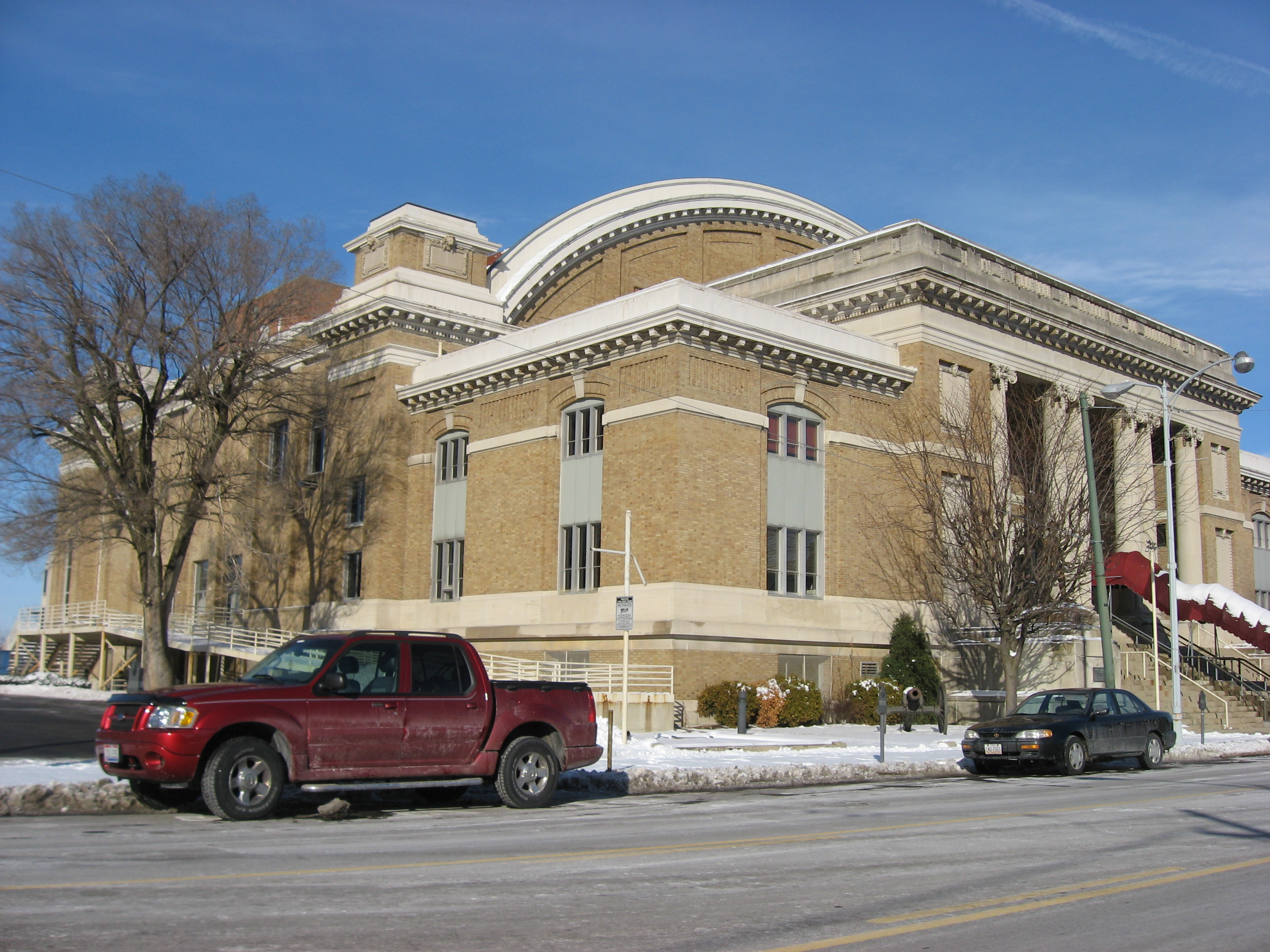
- Front and western side of the hall

- Location within Ohio Location within the United States
- Location: 125 E. First St., Dayton, Ohio
- Coordinates: 39°45′51″N 84°11′23″W
- Area: Less than 1 acre (0.40 ha)
- Built: 1907
- Architect: William Earl Russ, et al.
- Architectural style: Beaux-Arts
- NRHP reference No.: 88001062
- Added to NRHP: July 14, 1988

The Dayton Memorial Hall is a historic meeting venue on First Street in downtown Dayton, Ohio, United States. Constructed shortly after the turn of the twentieth century, this Beaux-Arts structure is one of many memorial halls statewide from the same time period, and it has been named a historic site.

The Memorial Hall is a brick building with a concrete foundation, a ceramic tile roof, and elements of stone and terracotta. Its central section, meant to hold the activities for which the building was constructed, is a two-story structure, while other sections vary in scale: a grand Neoclassical entrance, complete with paired columns in the Ionic order, sits atop a flight of steps in the middle of the facade, while lesser sections flank the entrance and compose the building's sides. Small towers are placed atop the sides, between the central auditorium and the surrounding land. Although the main entrance is only accessed via the flight of steps, side entrance may be gained by the use of a ramp. The building's entrance comprises the memorial itself, housing inscriptions honoring local Civil War soldiers and a sculpture honoring Spanish–American War soldiers; a World War I sculpture sits in the same area.

Legislation enacted by the General Assembly in 1902 encouraged the construction of memorial buildings in communities statewide; for the first time, municipalities were permitted to float bonds in order to obtain money needed to construct such buildings. Designed by William Earl Russ, erected in 1907, and dedicated in 1910, Dayton's was typical of the numerous memorial buildings built soon after the law's passage, both architecturally and functionally. Throughout the century following, it served as a meeting place for community activities ranging from entertainment festivities to educational events to cultural activities.

In 1988, the Memorial Hall was listed on the National Register of Historic Places, qualifying both because of its significant architecture and its important place in Dayton's history. Similar recognition has been awarded to other memorial halls in the Ohio cities of Cincinnati, Greenville, and Lima, all of which are Neoclassical structures completed soon after the 1902 legislation.

== See also ==
- National Register of Historic Places listings in Dayton, Ohio
