= Ortha O. Barr Sr. =

American attorney, businessman and politician

Ortha Orrie Barr Sr.

Member of the Ohio House of Representatives from the Allen County district
- In office January 1931 – January 1935

Personal details
- Born: February 24, 1879 Clark County, Ohio, U.S.
- Died: December 5, 1958 (aged 79) Hollywood, California, U.S.
- Resting place: Gethsemani Cemetery, Lima, Ohio
- Party: Democratic
- Spouses: Bertha Anna Woerner (m. 1907; died 1953); Lenna Rudy (m. 1956)
- Children: 5, including Ortha Jr.
- Parents: Dr. Eugene Jacob Barr (father); Sadie C. Michael (mother)
- Education: University of Michigan (LLB, 1904)
- Occupation: Attorney; Businessman; Politician
- Known for: Original co-proprietor of the Barr Hotel, Lima, Ohio

Ortha Orrie Barr Sr. (February 24, 1879 – December 5, 1958) was an American lawyer, businessman and politician who served as a two-term Member of the Ohio House of Representatives from January 1931 until January 1935. Together with his physician father, Dr. Eugene Barr, Ortha Barr co-established the historic Barr Hotel in Lima, Ohio, built in 1914 and formally opened in October 1916.

== Early life and education ==
Ortha Orrie Barr was born on February 24, 1879, in Clark County, Ohio, to Dr. Eugene Jacob Barr, a physician and his wife, Sadie C. Michael of Tremont City, Ohio. Eugene and Sadie Barr had married in 1877. The Barr family moved to Allen County in 1885 where Ortha Barr attended local elementary and middle schools. He had a half-sister, Mabel Barr whose mother, Mattie A. Miller, daughter of John G. Miller married Eugene Barr in 1883, presumably after the dissolution of his first marriage. Ortha Barr was a student at the now defunct Lima College, an Evangelical Lutheran institution which operated from 1893 to 1908. Ortha O. Barr was a 1904 LLB graduate of the University of Michigan Law School.

== Legal and business career ==
Barr became one of two Deputy Sheriffs in Allen County in the early 1900s. His father, Dr. E. J. Barr was Allen County Sheriff at the time, winning two terms and serving for 15 years, from 1901 to 1916. In his first election, Eugene Barr defeated his William McComb. From 1911 to 1915. O. O. Barr was an Assistant Prosecuting Attorney for Allen County and became the substantive Prosecuting Attorney from 1915 to 1916, after winning an election. Barr belonged to the Allen County Bar Association. He entered a joint business venture with his father to build the historic seven-storey hotel, Barr Hotel in downtown Lima, Ohio, which officially began operations in October 1916. Over several years, the hotel expanded from the initial 88 rooms to 150 rooms. He had ownership stake in the Consolidated Bottling Works and served on the board on the erstwhile National Bank of Lima.

== Politics ==
Like his father, Ortha Barr was a member of the Democratic Party and served on the Allen County Central Committee. He again found success in electoral politics when he won the November 1930 polls and became a two-term Allen County Representative in the Ohio House of Representatives from January 1931 to January 1935. During his first term in the state legislature from 1931 to 1933, he became a member of the house taxation committee where he sponsored a bill to put a limit on interest rates in state of Ohio. In his second term from 1933 to 1935, Barr was a appointed to the committee on County Affairs and also, chaired the committee on State Buildings, Parks, and Public Works. He also wrote a legislative bill that created the Lima Municipal Court.

== Personal life ==
On September 4, 1907, Ortha O. Barr married Bertha Anna Woerner (1881-1953) of Burlington, Des Moines, Iowa, with whom he had five children, Catharine E. (died as a toddler), Robert Ortha (1910-1996), Margaret A. (1914-1999), Edna Barr Hunter (1915-2009) and Ortha O. Barr, Jr. (1922-2003). Ortha Barr Sr. held different roles in several social clubs, Masonic and fraternal societies in Ohio, including President (1943–44) of the Lima Sertoma Club, Member, Independent Order of Odd Fellows, local chapter Grandmaster (Grand Chancellor) of the Knights of Pythias. He was the chancellor of Lima Lodge No. 91. He held the honorific “Esteemed Lecturing Knight” of the Benevolent and Protective Order of Elks. He was also a Scottish Rite Mason. Ortha Barr followed the footsteps of his father, Eugene Barr, who was also a Knight of Pythias and an Elk. Ortha Barr also belonged to the Lima chapter of the Sertoma Club where he was a life member and in 1943, served as President of the service club. Ortha Barr was a member of the Methodist Episcopal Church.

=== Parentage ===
Ortha Orrie Barr’s father, Eugene Barr was born in Auglaize County, Ohio, on September 21, 1857, to medical doctor, Dr. Tobias Barr. Eugene Barr’s mother was Margaret Weaver. Eugene Barr had his early education in Clark County and Lebanon, Ohio. He became a teacher at local schools in Champaign and Clark Counties. He matriculated at the Medical College of Ohio in Cincinnati and graduated on March 3, 1880. He was in private medical practice in Allen County from 1885 to 1895. He later became involved in the oil and timber trades. He was on the boards of the soda manufacturing company, Consolidated Bottling Company of Lima and timber companies, Southern Lumber Company and the Ohio Hardwood Lumber Company.

== Later life and death ==
Ortha Barr Sr. continued operating his family’s hotel business after active retirement from politics. Together with his wife, Bertha and another couple, Barr was involved in an auto accident involving a truck in Wapakoneta, Auglaize County, Ohio in September 1953, on their return from a wedding anniversary vacation in Connersville, Indiana. Barr’s wife died in the accident. He sold his equity stake in the Barr Hotel in 1956 to another hotel operator, C. O. Porter. He also remarried - to Lenna Rudy (born 2 May 1888 in Lima; died 9 April 1972 in Lima), a widow and a former Lima public schoolteacher.

Shortly after their marriage, Barr joined Lena Rudy in Hollywood, Los Angeles, California where she lived with her mother, Belle and worked as a film studio musician. Ortha Barr died in a rest home on December 5, 1958. He was buried at the Gethsemani Cemetery in Lima, Ohio. When Lena Rudy died in 1972, she was buried in Woodlawn Cemetery, Lima after her funeral at the Trinity United Methodist Church, also in Lima.
