= Klaus Block =

- U.S. National Register of Historic Places
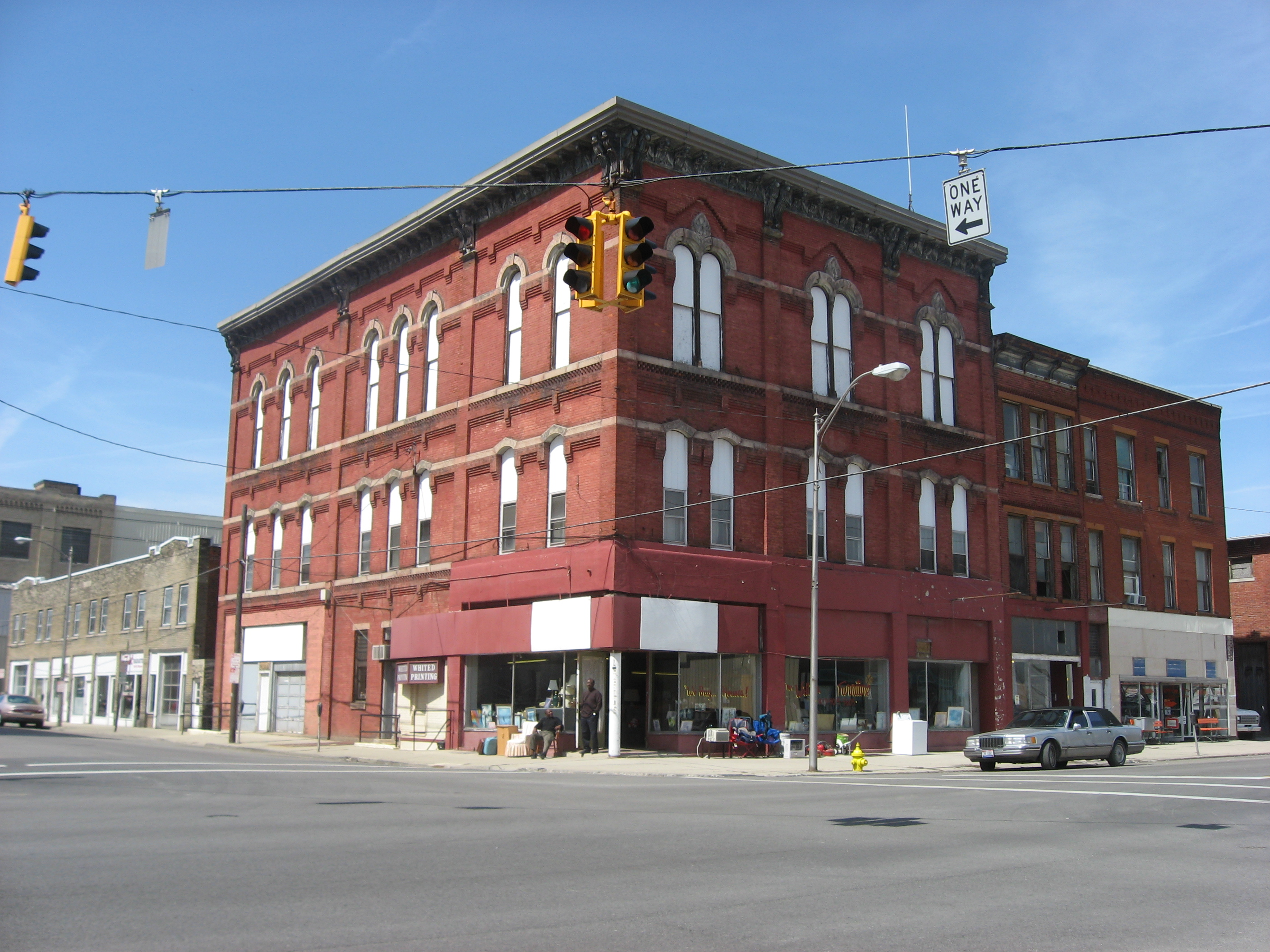
- Front and side of the Klaus Block

- Location within Ohio Location within the United States
- Location: 401-405 N. Main St., Lima, Ohio
- Coordinates: 40°44′39″N 84°6′19″W
- Area: less than one acre
- Built: 1870
- Architectural style: Gothic Revival
- MPS: Lima MRA
- NRHP reference No.: 82001864
- Added to NRHP: October 7, 1982

The Klaus Block is a historic building in downtown Lima, Ohio, United States. Built along Main Street in 1870, it is a rectangular three-story structure built in a Victorian variant of the Gothic Revival style of architecture. The exterior features a simple rectangular shape of three bays on each side, topped with a hip roof of asphalt. Decorations such as brick corbelling and stone trim highlight the interior.

Many types of businesses have occupied space in the Klaus Block through its history. In its earliest years, the block's builder operated a butcher shop in the building, and a speakeasy operated in a ballroom on the topmost floor during Prohibition. A pharmacy has always been run in its southeastern (frontmost) corner.

During the 1870s, the increasing importance of the railroad industry to Lima's northern side resulted in the northward expansion of the city's downtown. The Klaus Block was one of several large buildings erected in the city at this time; among these structures was the Allen County Courthouse, which is also located to the north of the original downtown.

In 1982, the Klaus Block was listed on the National Register of Historic Places in recognition of its architectural significance. It was one of seventeen Lima buildings that were listed on the National Register together as part of the Lima Multiple Resource Area.
