= Barr Hotel =

United States historic place

- U.S. National Register of Historic Places
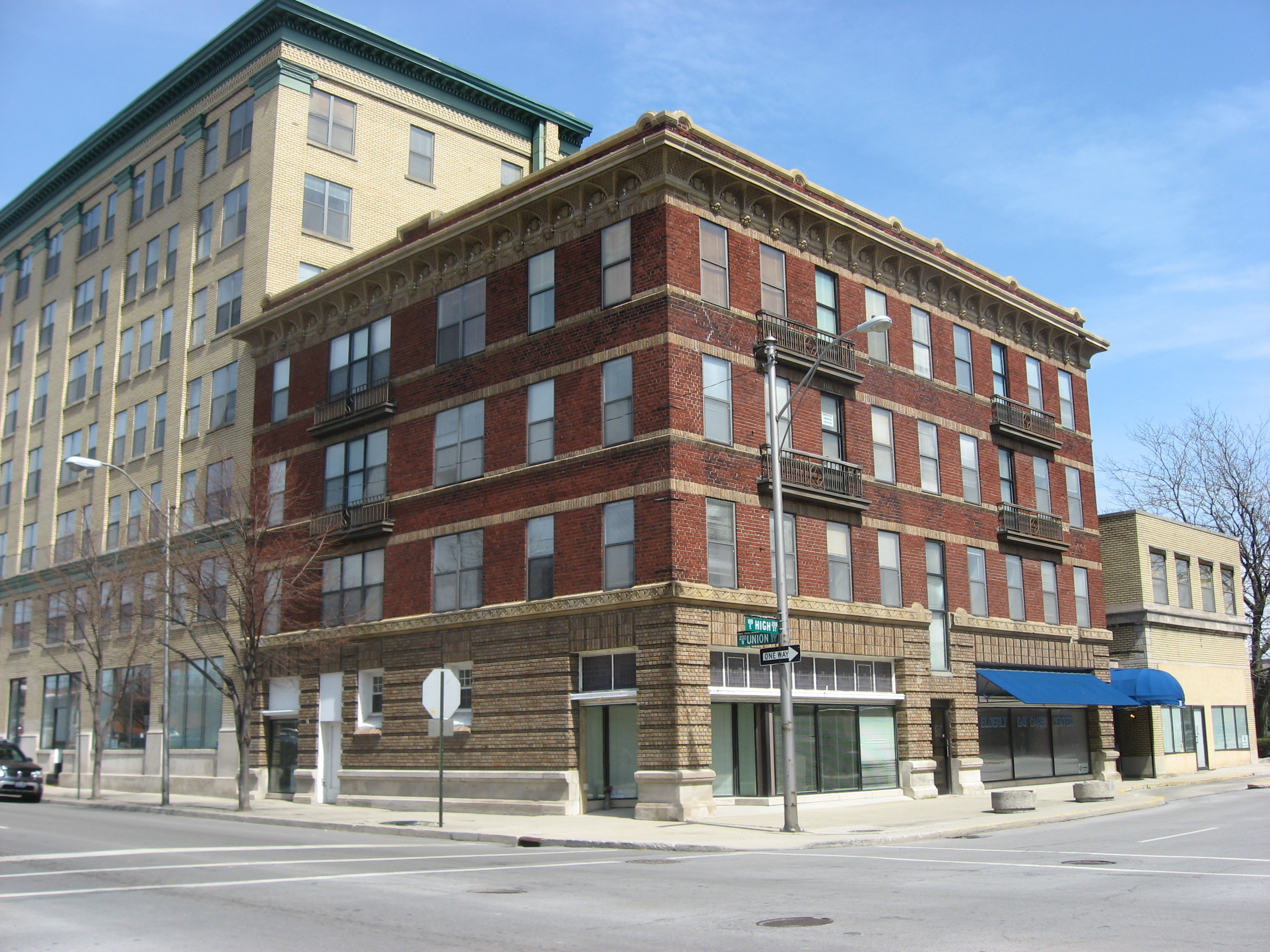
- The smaller of the two buildings of the Barr Hotel

- Location within Ohio Location within the United States
- Location: 201-209 E. High and 200-218 N. Union Sts., Lima, Ohio
- Coordinates: 40°44′16″N 84°6′11″W
- Area: less than one acre
- Built: 1914; 112 years ago
- Architectural style: Neoclassical
- NRHP reference No.: 86001053
- Added to NRHP: May 15, 1986

The Barr Hotel is a historic hotel on the eastern side of downtown Lima, Ohio, United States. Built in 1914, the Neoclassical hotel occupies the northeastern corner of the intersection of High and Union Streets.

== Architecture ==
The primary portion of the hotel is a brick building, seven stories tall; it rests on a concrete foundation and is covered by a flat roof. Next to this portion is a connected building, four stories high and also built of brick. Large sash windows and Ionic-capped pilasters are among the most distinctive elements of the primary portion of the hotel.

== Historical context ==
During the early twentieth century, Lima experienced rapid growth as a result of its place as a hub for Standard Oil and as the home of the Lima Locomotive Works. Many large buildings were erected in the city's downtown, including the still-standing Hotel Argonne and the Ohio Theatre. The Barr Hotel is a typical building of this period. Officially opened in October 1916, the original proprietors of the hotel were the physician, Dr. Eugene Jacob Barr and his attorney son, Ortha Orrie Barr Sr., who was later elected to the Ohio House of Representatives between 1931 and 1935. In 1956, businessman, C. O. Porter assumed ownership of the hotel.

== Recognition ==
In 1986, the Barr Hotel was listed on the National Register of Historic Places because of its significance in overall American history. As a little-altered example of Lima's golden years, the hotel was significant partially because of the unusually frequent destruction of historic buildings in Lima since the early twentieth century.

== Contemporary use ==
The entire building was refurbished in 1994 and became an apartment complex with modern fixtures and state-of-the-art amenities. The building, now called The Barr Apartments, was bought in spring 2010 by real estate investors, Michael and Barbara O'Connor, co-owners of the company, O'Connor Investment Properties. Tenants in the building are professionals working in the downtown Lima area as well as local university students.
