= George H. Maetzel =

German-American architect

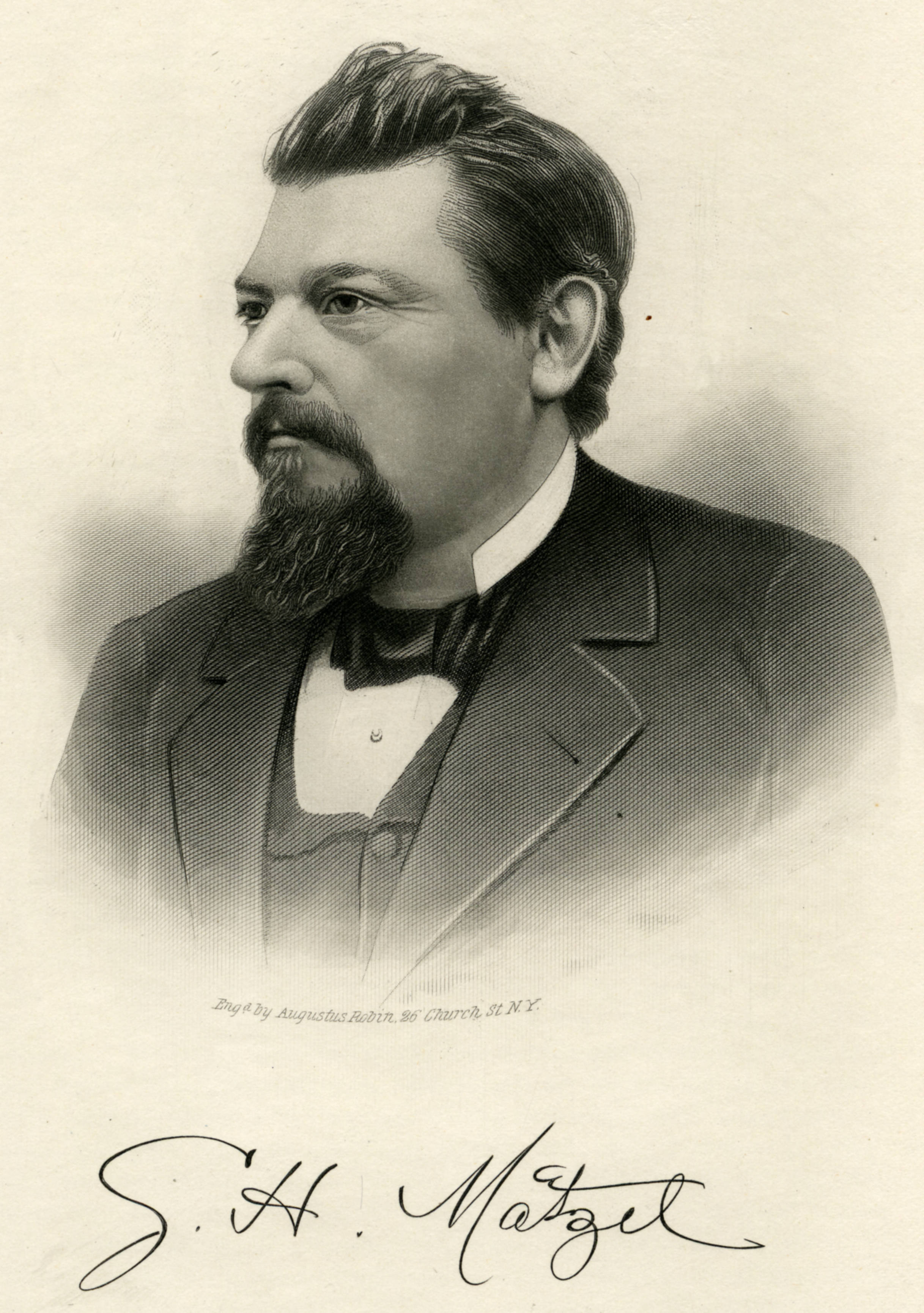
Maetzel's portrait and signature

George H. Maetzel (July 31, 1837 – May 25, 1891) was a German-American architect. He primarily designed buildings in Columbus, Ohio, including the 1887 Franklin County Courthouse. Maetzel also was the architect of Ohio's Allen, Madison, and Shelby county courthouses.

== Life ==
George H. Maetzel was born in Zittau in Saxony (part of present-day Germany) in 1837. In his early life, he worked for his parts, who ran a small hotel in Zittau. He left for military service in 1855, to the city of Dresden. After serving, he stayed in the city to study mechanical engineering. He immigrated to the United States in 1863. This was shortly after a golden age of German immigration, between 1830 and 1860. Midwest cities including Columbus, Cincinnati, and Cleveland grew to have large German populations during this time.

In the U.S., Maetzel began architectural and engineering work in Providence, Rhode Island. During the American Civil War he was engineer of the U.S. arsenal in Providence, and was enlisted under the command of Franz Sigel. When the war ended, he moved to Pittsburgh and worked at Pittsburgh Locomotive Works. He began working in civil engineering for the Pennsylvania Railroad and became a draftsman, involved in constructing their workshops in Dennison, Ohio in 1869. After a few months, Maetzel came to Columbus and continued as a draftsman for the railway there for a year. In 1871, Maetzel opened his own architect and engineering office in Columbus, at the corner of Town and Front Streets. He ran the firm for years, until his death.

Maetzel hired Joseph Dauben, who became a partner in Maetzel's firm after three years. Dauben continued to work with Maetzel until the latter's death, and continued designing buildings in Columbus.

Maetzel died on May 25, 1891, at the age of 53, a few hours after the beginning of a heavy cold. He is buried in Green Lawn Cemetery in Columbus.

=== Family ===
Maetzel married another German native, Lillie Andreison, who arrived in Baltimore and was on the last train from Baltimore to Pittsburgh before bridges were burnt at Harper's Ferry. The pair married in Pittsburgh in 1865, and had four children.

Maetzel's son Henry became city engineer in Columbus, and opened an architectural firm, Henry Maetzel & Company.

== Works ==
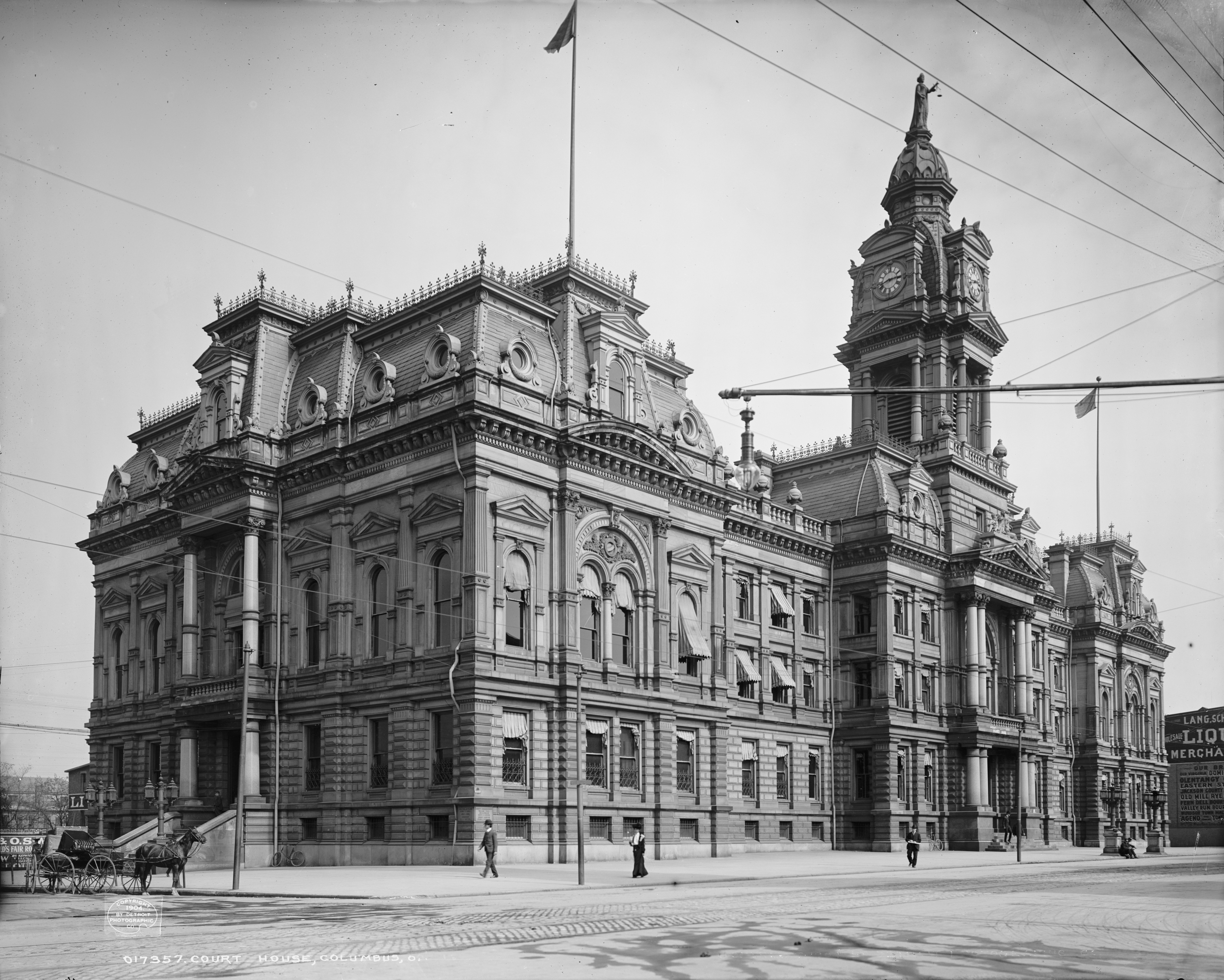
The 1887 Franklin County Courthouse

He designed numerous government and commercial buildings in Columbus, Ohio, including the 1887 Franklin County Courthouse, the Columbus City Prison, and the Schlee and Hoster breweries. He also designed Franklin County's infirmary. Most of his buildings have since been demolished. The oldest extant church building in Columbus, Holy Cross, was also designed by him.

Outside of Columbus, Maetzel designed the Allen, Madison, and Shelby county courthouses, all in Ohio.
