= Ortha O. Barr, Jr. =

American attorney (1922-2003)

- Born: March 4, 1922
- Died: March 24, 2003 (aged 81)
- Education: University of Michigan; University of Michigan Law School
- Spouse: Marie Virginia Infante
- Children: 5
- Parent(s): Ortha Orrie Barr Sr. and Bertha Anna Woerner

Ortha Orrie Barr, Jr. (March 4, 1922 – March 24, 2003) was an American attorney who was the Democratic Party candidate for Ohio’s 4th congressional district for the U. S. House of Representatives in 1956. The Republican incumbent William Moore McCulloch defeated him by nearly 38 percentage points. McCulloch was an eleven-term congressman from 1947 to 1973. Barr was a Prisoner of War in World War II.

== Life ==
Barr's parents were Ortha Orrie Barr Sr. and Bertha Anna Woerner. Ortha Barr Jr. was a World War II veteran and a prisoner of war. After returning from military service in World War II, Ortha O. Barr Jr. enrolled at the University of Michigan, where he earned a bachelor's degree in accounting in 1951. Barr was an alumnus of the University of Michigan Law School (Class of 1954), where his father Ortha O. Barr, Sr. had graduated from with an LLB degree in 1904. Ortha Barr Jr. married Marie Virginia Infante in 1945 and they had five children. He died in 2003 and was buried at the Ohio Western Reserve National Cemetery in Rittman, Medina County.
