= Columbus City Prison =

Columbus, Ohio prison operating from 1879 to 1920

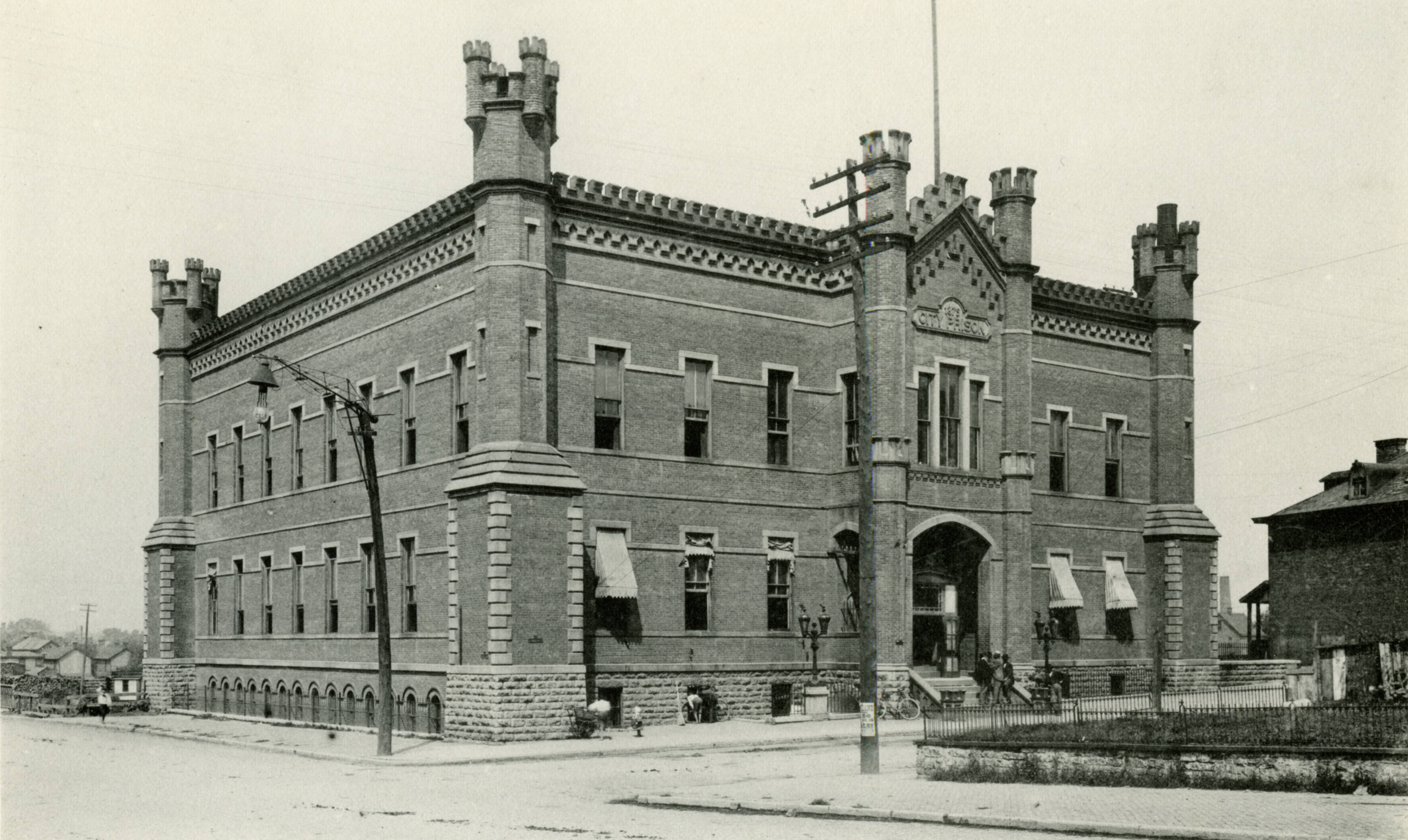
- The prison c. 1897
- Present-day site of the prison
- Location: Columbus, Ohio; 39.958819°N 83.002984°W
- Status: Demolished
- Opened: December 29, 1879
- Closed: 1920
- Building details

Technical details
- Floor count: 3

Design and construction
- Architect: George H. Maetzel

The Columbus City Prison was a municipal prison in Downtown Columbus, Ohio. The building was constructed in 1879 in a castle-like style, designed by architect George H. Maetzel. The building served as a prison and headquarters of the Columbus Police Department until a fire demolished the structure in 1920.

== Attributes ==
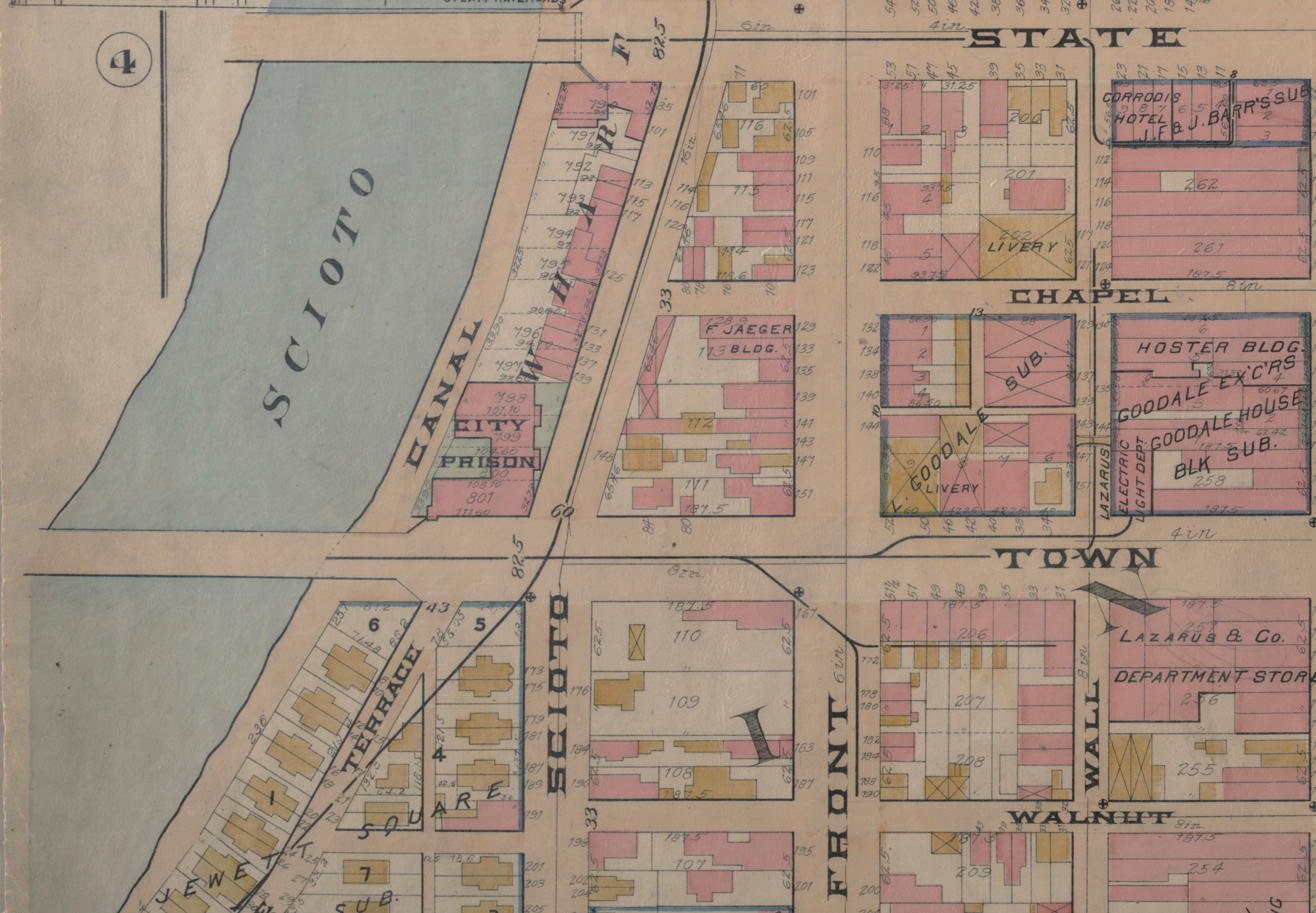
The prison as labeled on an 1899 map

The building was located at the northwest corner of Town and South Scioto Streets (near the present-day Civic Center Drive) in the city's downtown. It was designed by George H. Maetzel, later the architect of the 1887 Franklin County Courthouse, in a castle-like style. It was built at a cost of $72,000.

The building's main entrance was on its east side, flanked by two large, elegantly-designed gas lampposts, made of iron and glass.

The building had iron prison cells in its basement or lower level. There were four cell rooms, two for males and two for females, containing 78 cells. The rooms were described as large, well-heated, well-lit, and perfectly ventilated and sewered, keeping away foul odors and air. Some wooden cells on the first floor, the only ones not made of iron, were used for detaining witnesses, peoples sick and injured, and the "better class of female prisoners".

The prison served as the headquarters of the Columbus Police Department. The eastern side of the building had elegant rooms for the police board, and its secretary and superintendent. A large and elaborate courtroom was constructed on the southwest corner of the building's third floor. It had a large, intricate, marble-topped judge's desk, and desks for reporters, lawyers, and the police secretary. Bathrooms, washrooms, and water closets were placed throughout the building.

== History ==
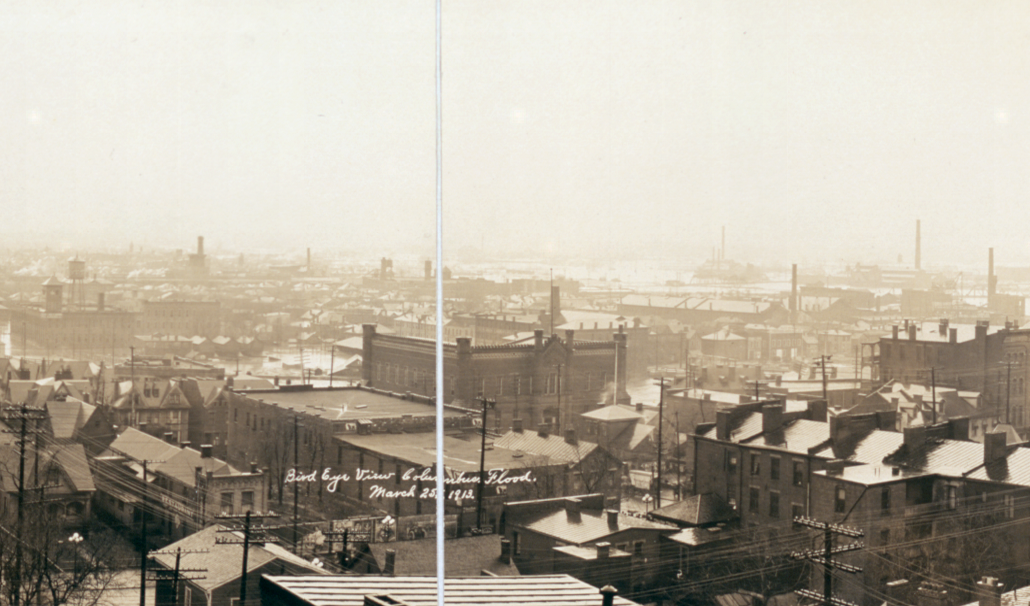
On March 25, 1913, during the Great Flood of 1913

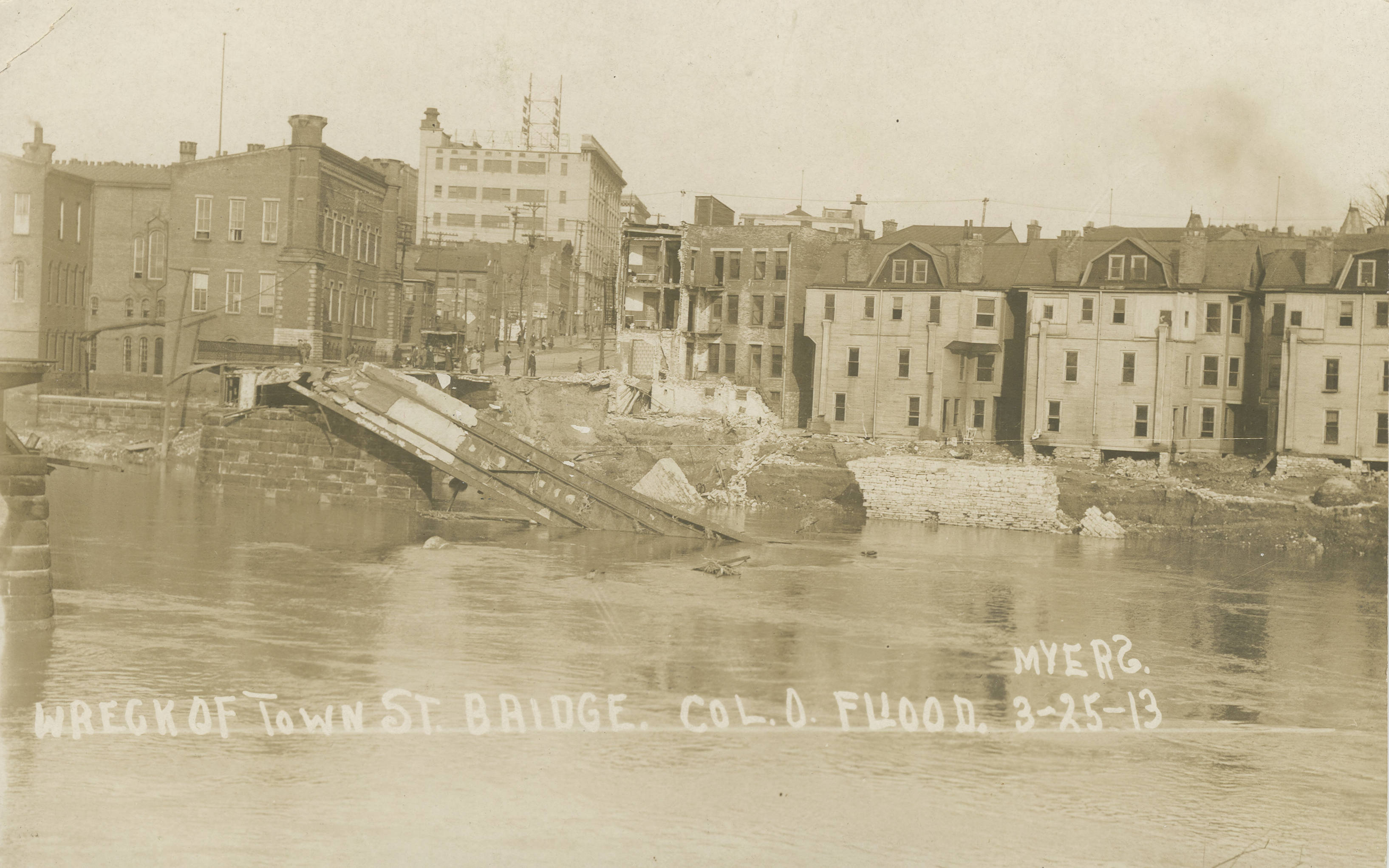
Rear of the building during the flood, beside the wreck of the Town Street Bridge

The first jail in the area was built in 1804 in Franklinton, near the site of its schoolhouse. It was the first county building, and was replaced three years later by a jail made of brick. A temporary jail was on the south side of Gay Street between High and Third Streets, or between Town and Rich streets, from 1824 to 1840, beginning when the county seat moved to Columbus.

The prison was commissioned by police commissioner David W. Brooks, grandson of a pioneering family of Columbus. The prior prison, by the late 1870s, was a "brick death trap", a two-story building just behind Central Market. Prisoners were led from the building, across a wooden walkway, to the courtroom and city council chamber on the second floor of the market building. The new prison, a castle-like structure, opened on December 29, 1879. Official invitations to the opening were passed out to 2,200 families, though the doors were open to the public. Councilmembers, a committee, and the Barracks Band received visitors inspecting the prison, offices, courtroom, drill room, and hospital. The architect handed keys to city officials, and speeches were made by these men.

The building was positively reviewed by The Columbus Evening Dispatch at its opening, for its innovations, spaciousness, elegant design, and view overlooking the river; the paper considered the new prison one of the most elegant and best arranged buildings of its kind in the country.

The building's emergency hospital was moved from the wooden cell area, where it was uninviting, to a new portion of the building around 1900; the space was completed on October 14, 1900. During the Great Flood of 1913, the building became a site of refuge for dozens of people overnight. Despite this, several prisoners' cells were flooded out, with plans to transfer them to the county jail temporarily. The prison served as relief headquarters after the flood.

The prison was demolished in 1920, after its offices and prisoners were moved to the city workhouse. By this time, 40 years of occupancy were seen as too many; it became ill-adapted to its needs. Prohibition had also lessened the need for prisons or workhouses, allowing for consolidation of the two. The building, still in some use in July 1920, was damaged by a fire. The roof was destroyed in several places, allowing rain to damage additional portions of the building.

== See also ==
- List of demolished buildings and structures in Columbus, Ohio
