= Renz Block =

- U.S. National Register of Historic Places
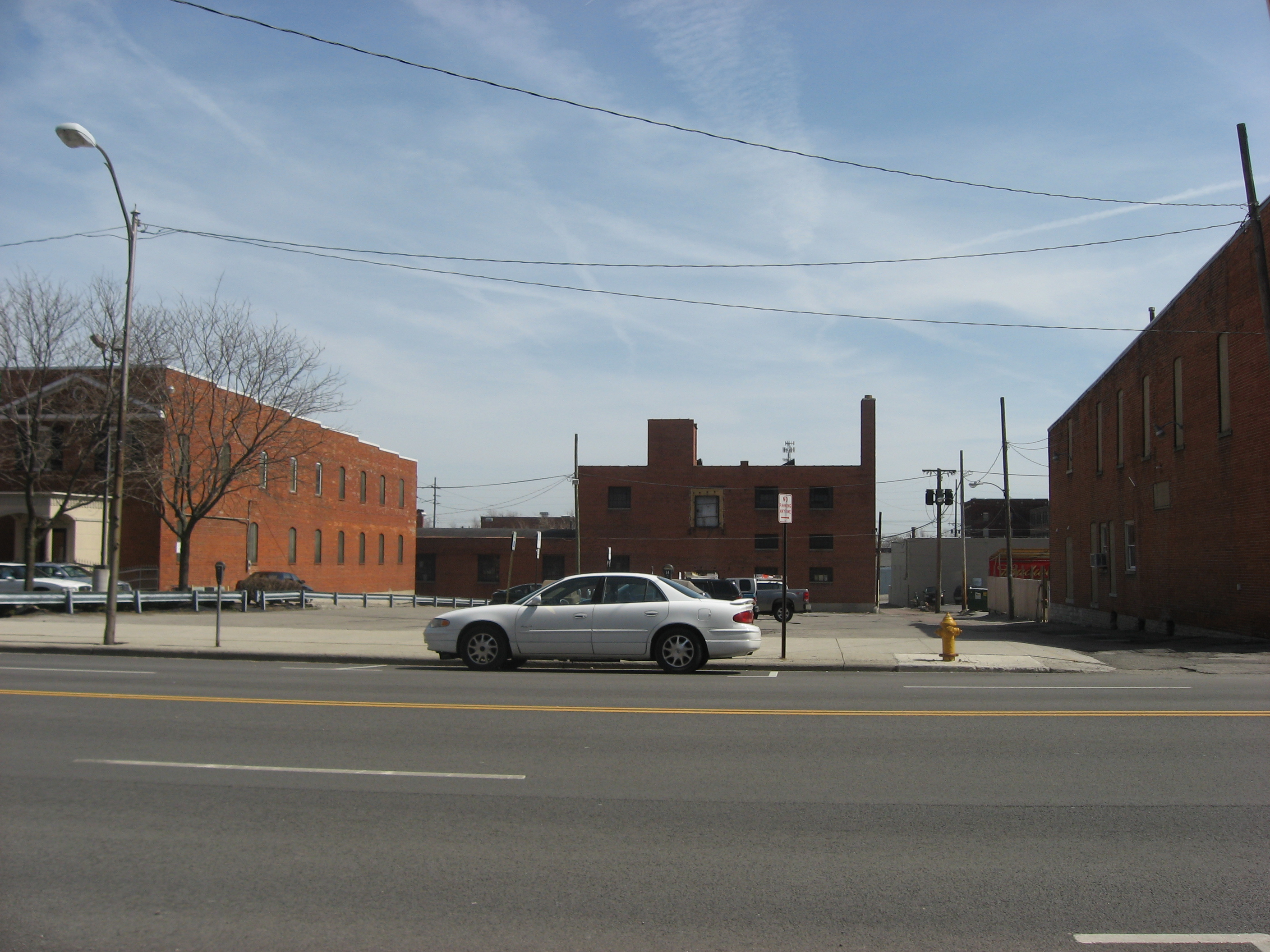
- Site of the block

- Location within Ohio Location within the United States
- Location: 320 N. Main St., Lima, Ohio
- Coordinates: 40°44′36″N 84°6′18″W
- Area: less than one acre
- Built: 1900
- Architect: Charles W. Dawson
- Architectural style: Late Victorian
- MPS: Lima MRA
- NRHP reference No.: 82001354
- Added to NRHP: October 7, 1982

The Renz Block was a historic commercial building in downtown Lima, Ohio, United States. Located along North Main Street across from the Allen County Courthouse, the block was built in 1900 in a late variant of the Victorian style. A three-story building, the Renz Block was constructed primarily of brick with stone details; the roof was flat and made of asphalt. Among its leading aspects were an elaborate parapet and a heavily decorated facade, including windows with doubly sashed transom lights.

The Renz Block was named for baker Jacob Renz, its second owner, who founded a bakery on North Main in 1887. By 1903, his business had expanded to the point that he needed to purchase larger premises; accordingly, he bought a nearby three-year-old building and established his business there. For many years, the company was a leading part of the local economy; at the time of its sale to another company in 1958, it was the largest bakery in Allen County.

When the Renz Block was constructed, Lima was in the middle of an economic boom prompted by the recent discovery of petroleum in the nearby vicinity; the city's population had grown by 300% in the previous fifteen years, and many large buildings were being erected in the city's downtown. Its architecture was comparable to or superior to that of many other period buildings; a 1980 survey ranked it as one of the most prominent examples of late nineteenth-century architecture remaining in the city. In recognition of its significant architecture, it was listed on the National Register of Historic Places in 1982, along with seventeen other downtown buildings. Another of these buildings was the nearby Metropolitan Block, which remained an even better example of late nineteenth-century architecture than the Renz Block. Since that time, the Renz Block has been demolished; although it is still listed on the National Register, a parking lot sits at its location.
