= Metropolitan Block (Lima, Ohio) =

- U.S. National Register of Historic Places
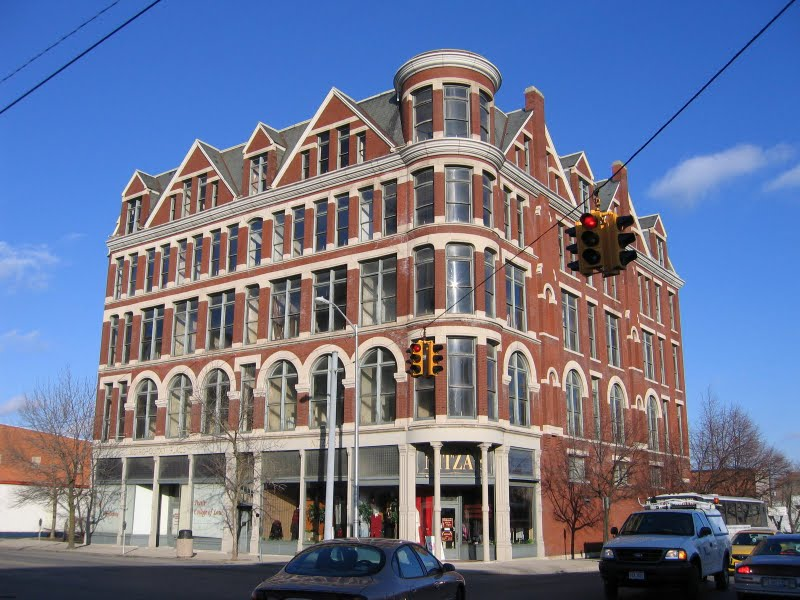
- Front and side of the block

- Location within Ohio Location within the United States
- Location: 300 N. Main St., Lima, Ohio
- Coordinates: 40°44′34″N 84°6′16″W
- Area: less than one acre
- Built: 1890
- Architectural style: Romanesque Revival
- NRHP reference No.: 79001780
- Added to NRHP: November 29, 1979

The Metropolitan Block is a historic commercial building along North Main Street in downtown Lima, Ohio, United States. Built in 1890 at the middle of Lima's petroleum boom, it is historically significant as a well-preserved example of Romanesque Revival architecture.

== Architecture ==
The Metropolitan Block is a five-story building constructed in a Victorian version of the Romanesque Revival style. Built primarily of brick, the block includes many stone details throughout its exterior, supporting elements of cast iron on the first floor, and the original glass windows of its storefronts. Among the building's decorative elements are transom windows of lavender-colored glass above the entrances, awnings of canvas covering the sidewalks around the building, and turrets at the top of the facade.

== Related buildings ==
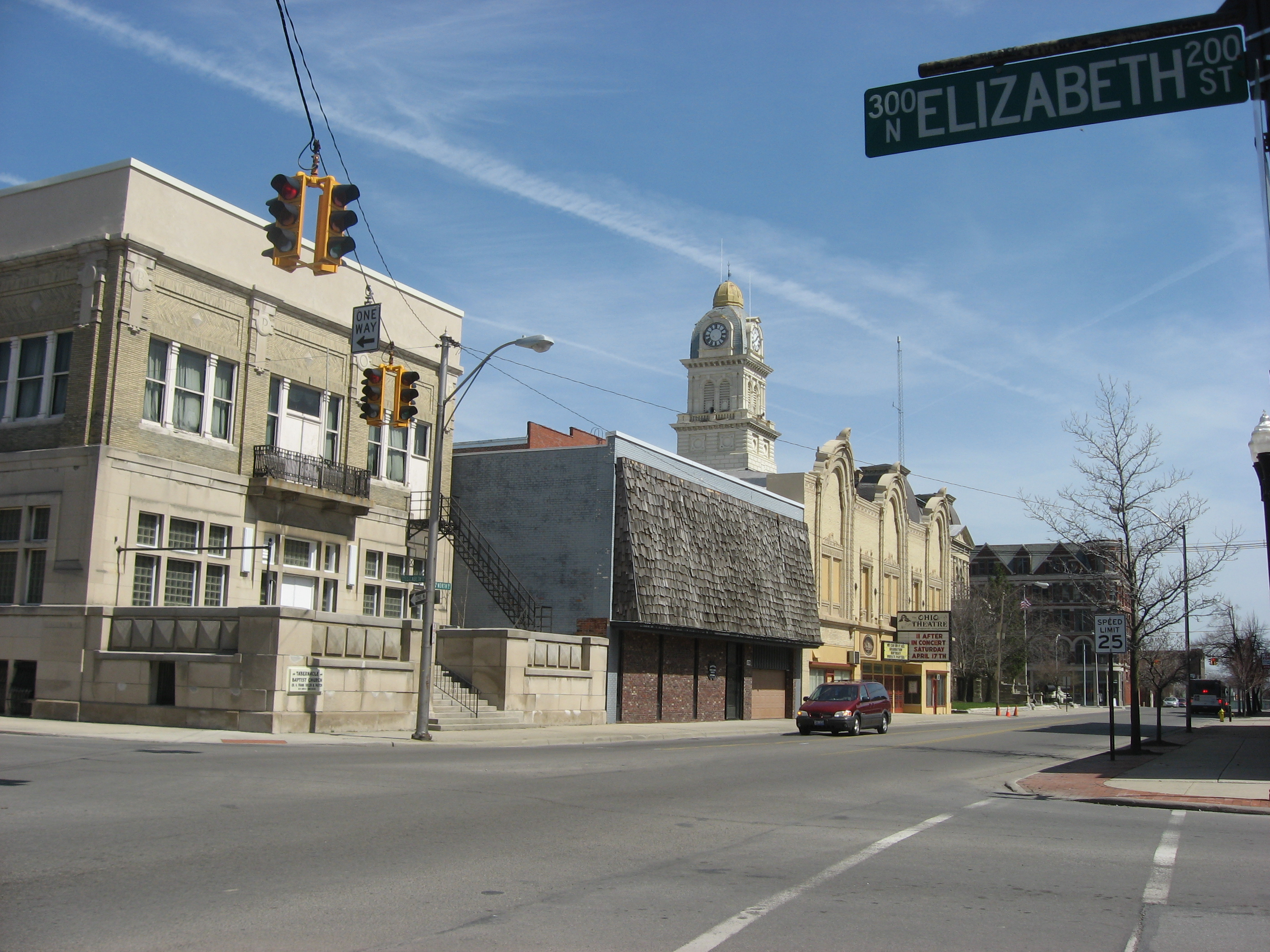
Buildings on North Street: from left to right, the Elks Lodge, a modern building, the tower of the Allen County Courthouse, the Ohio Theatre, and the Metropolitan Block

Many elaborate buildings were constructed in downtown Lima during the oil boom of the 1880s and 1890s, including the adjacent Renz Block and many buildings on South Main Street; however, the Metropolitan Block is the only major building of the period not to have been significantly modified.

During the early twentieth century, the establishment of Standard Oil offices in Lima and the increasing size of the Lima Locomotive Works led to the construction of more ornate buildings in the city's downtown. Among these structures were the Elks Lodge and Ohio Theatre, located less than one city block away on North Street.

== Recognition ==
In 1979, the Metropolitan Block was added to the National Register of Historic Places in recognition of its unusually well-preserved architecture. A remaining portion of the Miami and Erie Canal and four Lima buildings, including the Allen County Courthouse across Main Street from the Metropolitan Block, had previously been listed on the National Register. In 1982, nearly twenty other buildings in the city were added to the National Register as part of the "Lima Multiple Resource Area," a group of architecturally-significant buildings in the city's downtown. Among the buildings included in this collection were the Renz Block, the Ohio Theatre, the Elks Lodge, and several buildings on the nearby Public Square.
