= Neal Clothing Building =

United States historic place

- Neal Clothing
- U.S. National Register of Historic Places
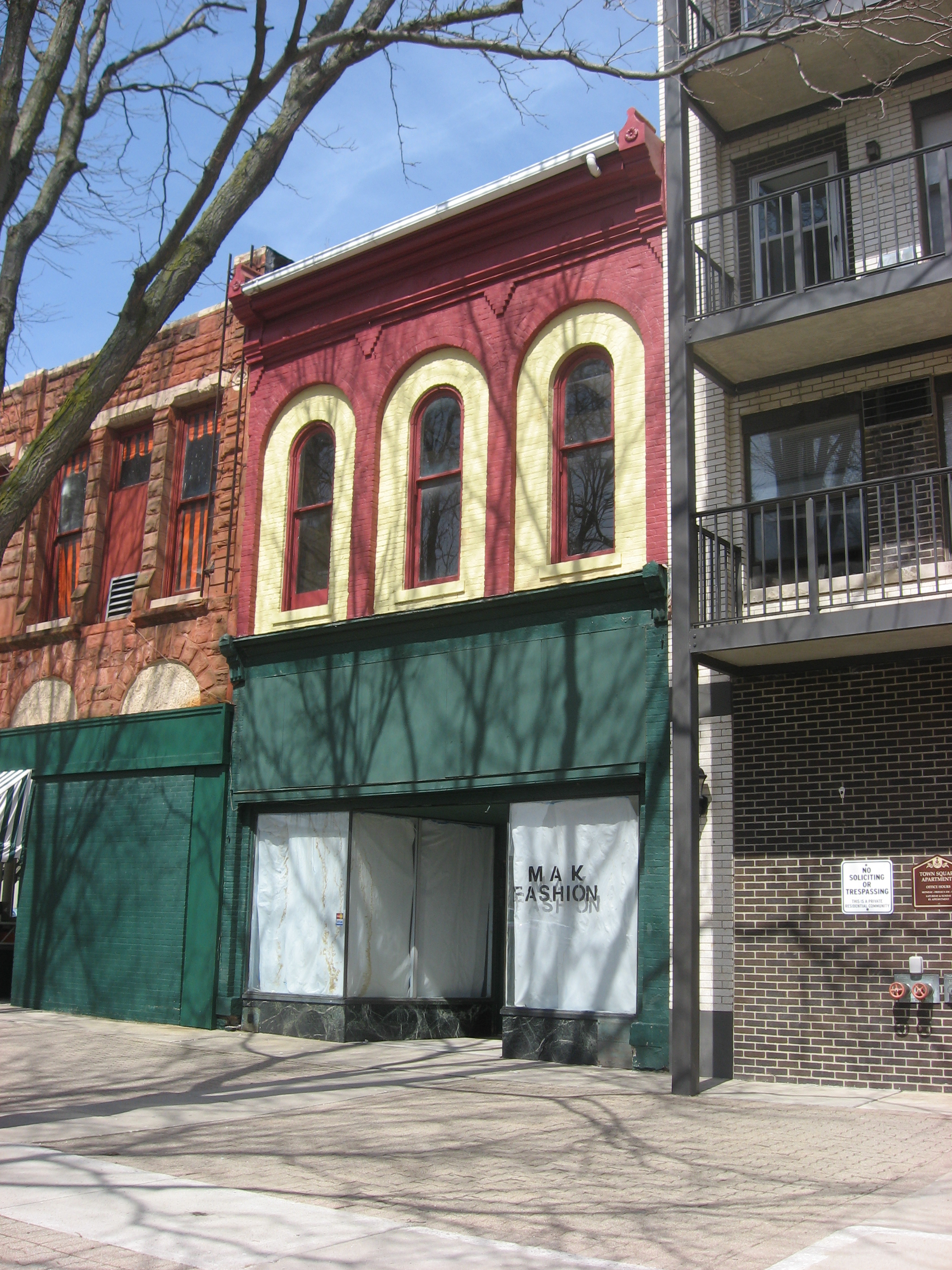
- Front of the building

- Location within Ohio Location within the United States
- Location: 74 Public Sq., Lima, Ohio
- Coordinates: 40°44′26″N 84°6′17″W
- Area: less than one acre
- Built: 1865
- Architectural style: Romanesque Revival
- MPS: Lima MRA
- NRHP reference No.: 82001870
- Added to NRHP: October 7, 1982

The Neal Clothing Building is the oldest existing building on the central square of Lima, Ohio, United States. Built before the end of the Civil War, it has been recognized as historically significant as a representative of the city's earliest period.

== Architecture ==
This two-story brick building lies on the northeastern corner of Public Square at the heart of the city. Among its distinctive architectural features are three rounded arch windows with sash panes, metal brackets, and multiple finials. Although some of the facade has been modified, an original metal awning covers the recessed entrance.

== Historic context ==
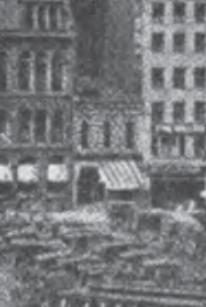
Photographed in 1921 or earlier

The Neal Clothing Building is the sole surviving building from downtown Lima's earliest period, and it appears in even the oldest pictures of the northeastern corner of the square. At this time, the city's economy was dependent primarily on the agriculture of the surrounding countryside. During the 1870s, the city's commerce grew as railroads expanded into the area, and several large commercial buildings, including the still-standing Union Block, were built on Public Square during this time. Further growth occurred after petroleum was found in the city's vicinity in 1885; as Lima's population grew 300% from 1880 to 1900, the need for larger buildings was apparent, and many ornate commercial structures were erected in the city during this period. As the boom continued into the twentieth century, other significant buildings were erected on Public Square, including the First National Bank and Trust Building.

== Historic landmark ==
In 1982, the Neal Clothing Building was listed on the National Register of Historic Places because of its historic architecture. Sixteen other downtown buildings, all newer, were added to the Register at the same time as part of the "Lima Multiple Resource Area," a collection of architecturally-significant buildings.
