= Griffith Breese Farm =

Historic house in Ohio, United States

- U.S. National Register of Historic Places
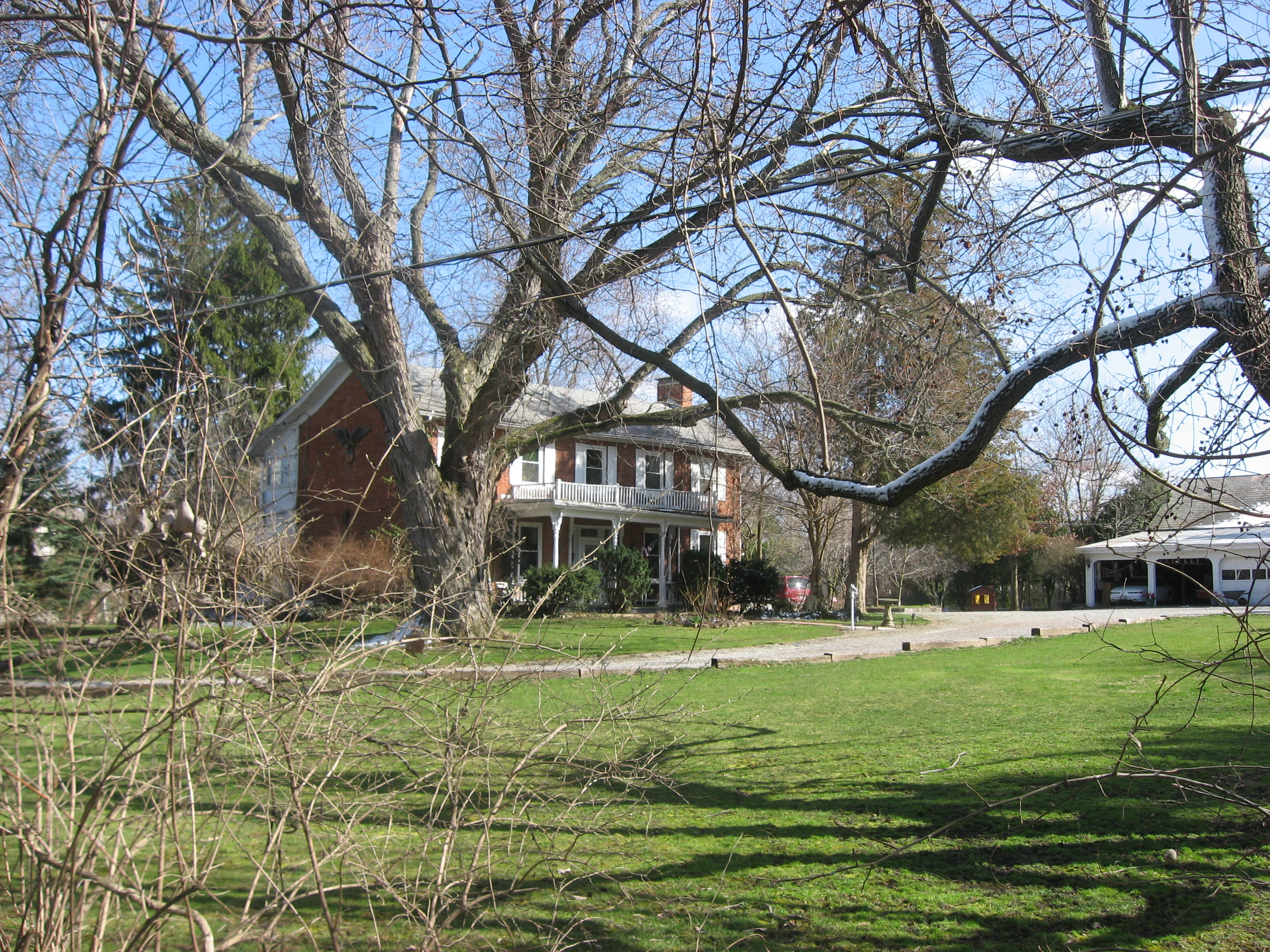
- Roadside view of the farmhouse

- Location within Ohio Location within the United States
- Location: 2875 Fort Amanda Road
- Nearest city: Lima, Ohio
- Coordinates: 40°42′9″N 84°9′32″W
- Area: 65 acres (26 ha)
- Built: 1840
- Architect: Griffith Breese
- Architectural style: Federal
- NRHP reference No.: 83001942
- Added to NRHP: January 11, 1983

The Griffith Breese Farm is a historic farmstead in southern Allen County, Ohio, United States. Established in 1840, the farm is one of the oldest white settlements in a formerly Native American area of northwestern Ohio, and it has been designated a historic site because of its unusually good degree of preservation.

== Griffith Breese ==
The son of John Breese, Griffith was a native of Wales who immigrated to the United States in 1798. He married a Pennsylvania native, Mary Mowen, who bore him a son George in Franklin County, Pennsylvania, before they moved to Ohio. Breese bought six sections of land in present-day Shawnee Township, on lands that had once been part of the Hog Creek Indian Reservation. Moving his family to Section 10 of the township in 1834, they found that their new home was a former apple orchard: eighty apple trees and seven cabins of the Shawnee former residents occupied the site. During their first winter, they lived in the reservation's former council house, and Breese was elected to the first group of trustees of the Shawnee Township. By 1840, Breese had grown sufficiently prosperous that he was able to establish the present homestead. The first of the four Federal buildings on the property were erected in that year, and he bought additional land in northwestern Allen County's Marion Township five years later. Breese continued to live on the farm until his death in 1848.

== Recent history ==
Today, the Griffith Breese Farm is a major historic site in Shawnee Township. With the decline in Lima's economy, Shawnee Township has become a suburban area; small shopping malls and modern housing developments surround the farm, and no other pioneer homestead in the township has been so well preserved.

In recognition of its historic architecture, the Griffith Breese Farm was listed on the National Register of Historic Places in 1983. Four buildings, spread out over an area of 65 acres (26 ha), qualified as contributing properties.
