= Shawnee Township, Allen County, Ohio =

Township in Ohio, US

- Township
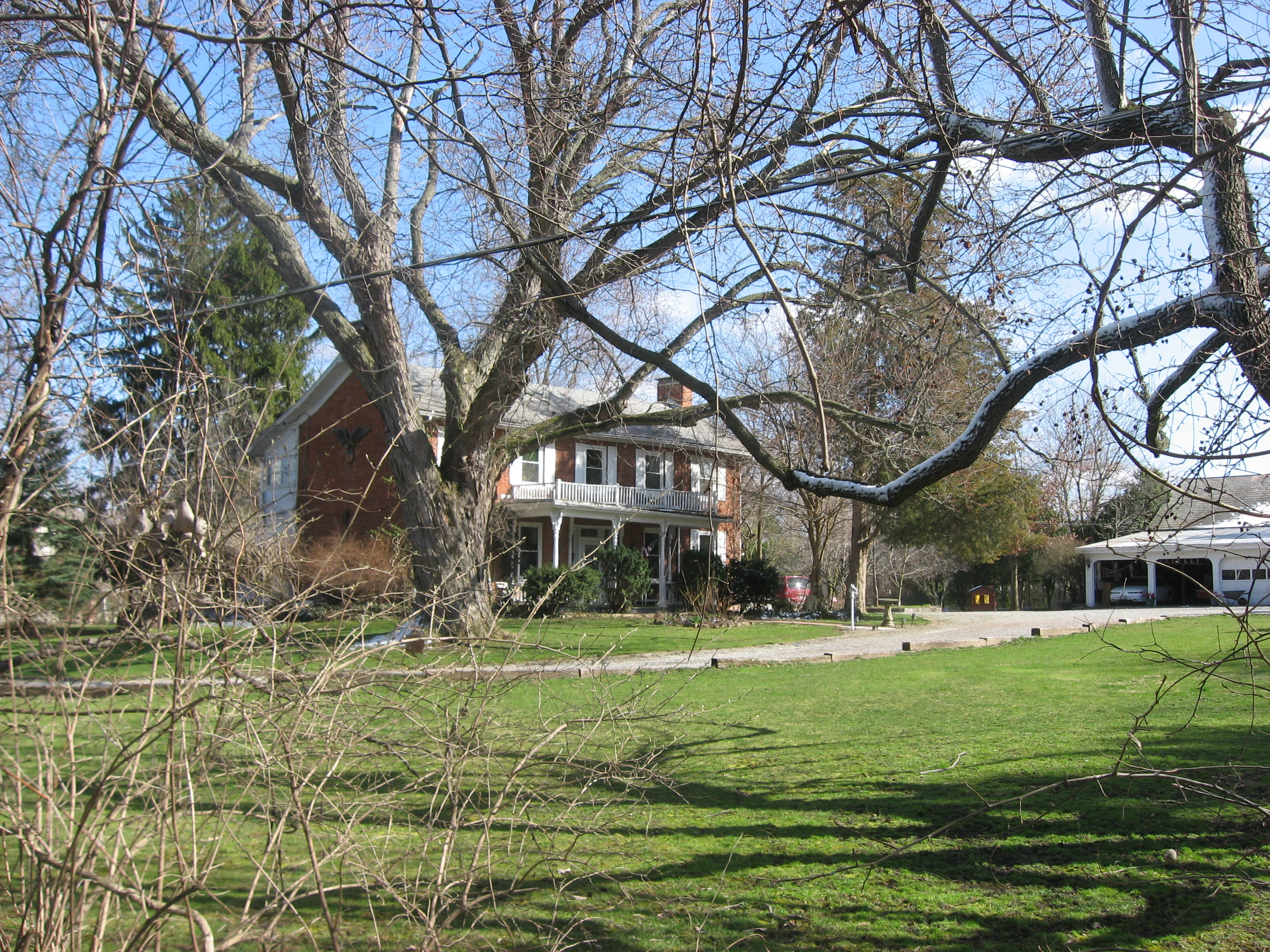
- The Griffith Breese Farm, a historic site in the township

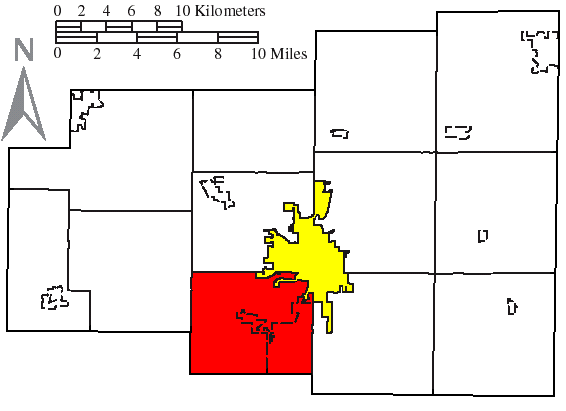
- Location of Shawnee Township, Allen County, Ohio
- Coordinates: 40°41′49″N 84°9′15″W
- Country: United States
- State: Ohio
- County: Allen

Area
  - Total: 29.3 sq mi (75.8 km^{2})
  - Land: 29.0 sq mi (75.1 km^{2})
  - Water: 0.31 sq mi (0.8 km^{2})
- Elevation: 840 ft (256 m)

Population (2020)
  - Total: 12,482
  - Density: 429/sq mi (165.6/km^{2})
- Time zone: UTC-5 (Eastern (EST))
  - Summer (DST): UTC-4 (EDT)
- FIPS code: 39-71955
- GNIS feature ID: 1085699
- Website: shawneetownship.com

Shawnee Township is one of the twelve townships of Allen County, Ohio, United States. The population was 12,482 at the 2020 census.

== Geography ==
Located in the southern part of the county, it borders the following townships:

- American Township - north
- Bath Township - northeast corner
- Perry Township - east
- Duchouquet Township, Auglaize County - south
- Logan Township, Auglaize County - southwest
- Amanda Township - northwest

Part of Lima is located in northeastern Shawnee Township. Fort Shawnee is located in the township's eastern sections; currently unincorporated, it was a village until its dissolution in 2012.

== Name and history ==
It is the only Shawnee Township statewide.

One historic site in the township, the Griffith Breese Farm, is listed on the National Register of Historic Places.

== Government ==
The township is governed by a three-member board of trustees, who are elected in November of odd-numbered years to a four-year term beginning on the following January 1. Two are elected in the year after the presidential election and one is elected in the year before it. There is also an elected township fiscal officer, who serves a four-year term beginning on April 1 of the year after the election, which is held in November of the year before the presidential election. Vacancies in the fiscal officership or on the board of trustees are filled by the remaining trustees.
