= Armory–Latisona Building =

- U.S. National Register of Historic Places
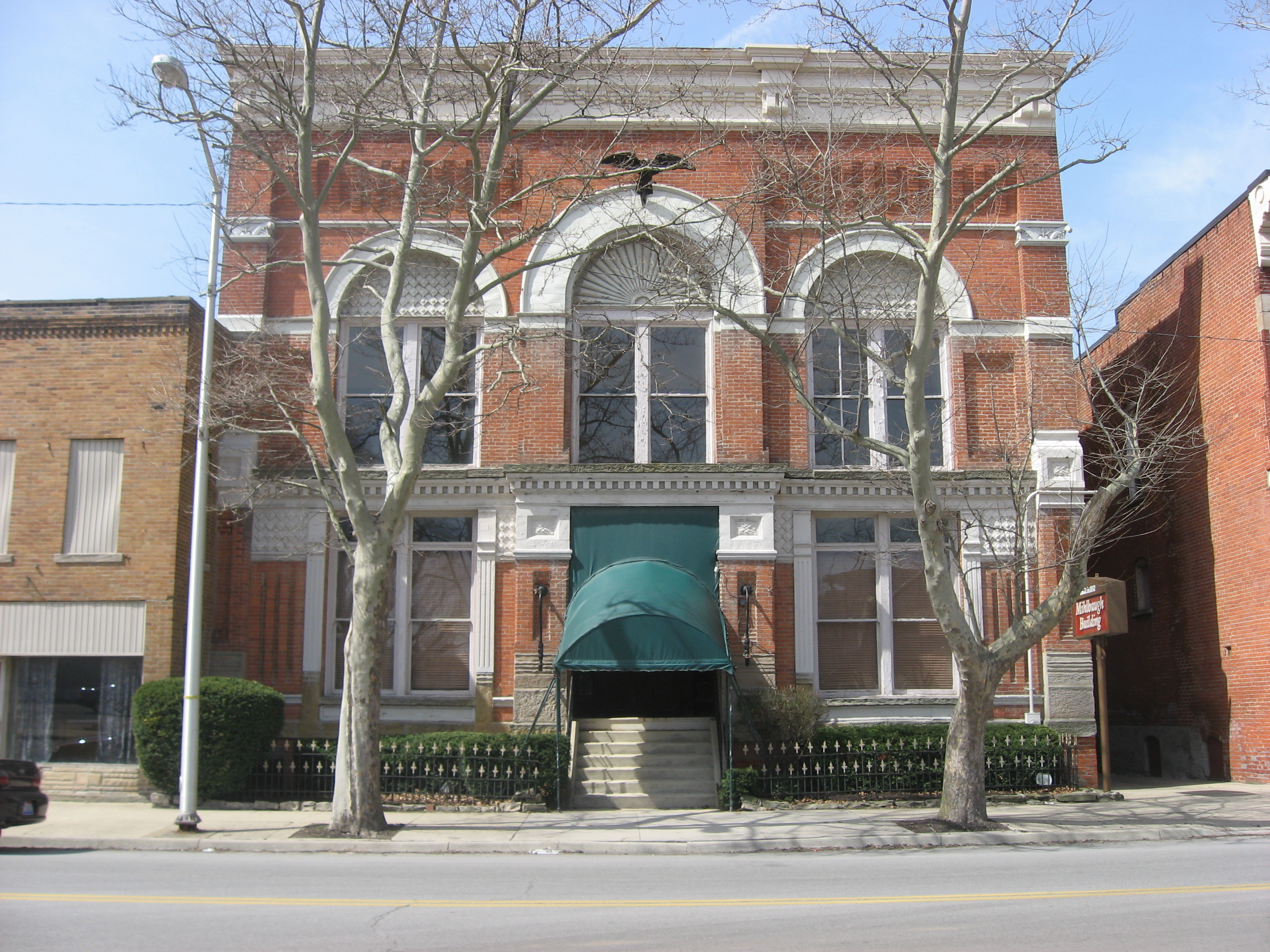
- Front of the building

- Location within Ohio Location within the United States
- Location: 440 S. Main St., Lima, Ohio
- Coordinates: 40°44′6″N 84°6′19″W
- Area: less than one acre
- Built: 1896
- Architectural style: Late Victorian, Romanesque
- MPS: Lima MRA
- NRHP reference No.: 82001348
- Added to NRHP: October 7, 1982

The Armory–Latisona Building (also known as the "Mihlbaugh Building") is a historic armory on South Main Street in Lima, Ohio, United States. Built in 1896, it features a Victorian variant of the Romanesque Revival style of architecture.

== Construction ==
After the discovery of petroleum in the vicinity of Lima in 1885, the city's population grew greatly, and the construction of commercial buildings along South Main Street proceeded at a rapid pace. Accompanying these new buildings in the southern Kibby Corners neighborhood were large numbers of frame houses erected as homes for the workers in the city's burgeoning industrial enterprises.

== Preservation ==
Today, much of South Main Street and Kibby Corners languish in a state of decay. Many abandoned buildings have been demolished by the city government, and community areas such as parks and streetsides are becoming less attractive as a result of a lack of proper maintenance. Two exceptions to this process of decay are the Armory–Latisona Building and the adjacent Lima Cleaning and Pressing Company Building; these two historic buildings have been identified as key to the area's historic nature.

In 1982, the Armory–Latisona Building and the Lima Cleaning and Pressing Company Building were two of seventeen buildings in Lima that were added to the National Register of Historic Places as part of the "Lima Multiple Resource Area." The former armory's architectural integrity was key to its inclusion in this group of properties.
