= Union Block (Lima, Ohio) =

- U.S. National Register of Historic Places
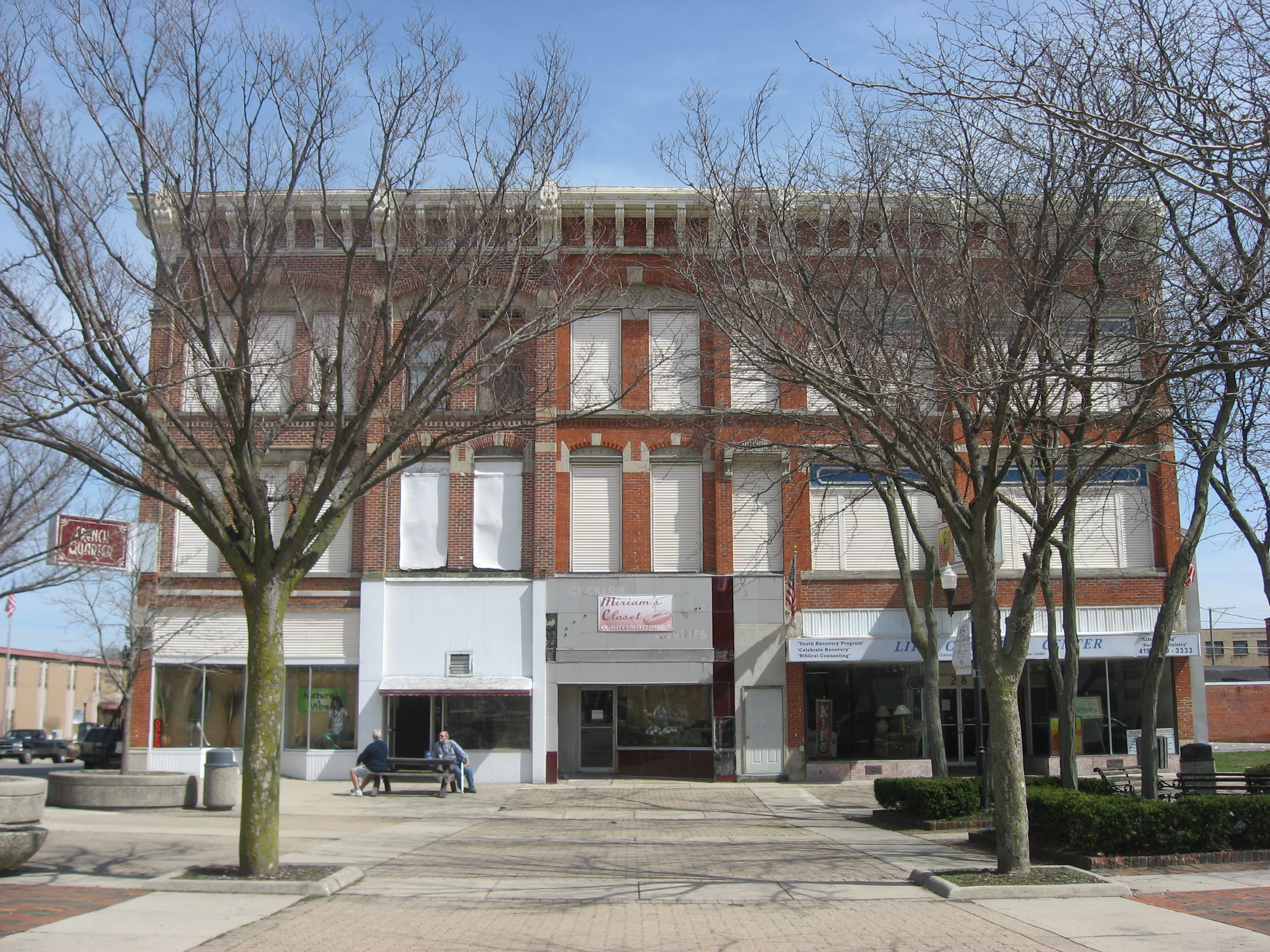
- Front of the Union Block

- Location within Ohio Location within the United States
- Location: 28-38 Public Sq., Lima, Ohio
- Coordinates: 40°44′23″N 84°6′17″W
- Area: less than one acre
- Built: 1878
- Architectural style: Late Victorian
- MPS: Lima MRA
- NRHP reference No.: 82001355
- Added to NRHP: October 7, 1982

The Union Block is a historic business building on Public Square in downtown Lima, Ohio, United States. Built in 1878, it is a three-story brick building with a modified rectangular floor plan and a sloping roofline.

From Lima's earliest years, the Union Block's site on the southeastern corner of today's Public Square was a leading commercial site. Preceding it was Lima's first hotel, built by the second white man to settle in Lima. The Union Block was constructed during a booming period in Lima's history. As the influence of railroading in Lima expanded during the 1870s, the city itself grew significantly; the Union Block was one of several major commercial buildings erected on Public Square during this period.

The block's architecture is an example of a commercial variant of the Victorian style. Among its most prominent exterior details are ornate lintels and stone trim, while the interior features iron posts on the first floor and a staircase of cast iron. Each bay features a cluster of windows, most of which are composed of two or three windows.

In 1982, the Union Block was listed on the National Register of Historic Places because of its well-preserved architecture. Sixteen other Lima buildings were listed on the National Register at the same time; all were part of the Lima Multiple Resource Area, a collection of architecturally-significant buildings in and around the city's downtown. Two other buildings on Public Square were included in this collection: the Neal Clothing Building, completed before the Civil War, and the early 20th-century First National Bank and Trust Building.
