= Linneman Building =

- U.S. National Register of Historic Places
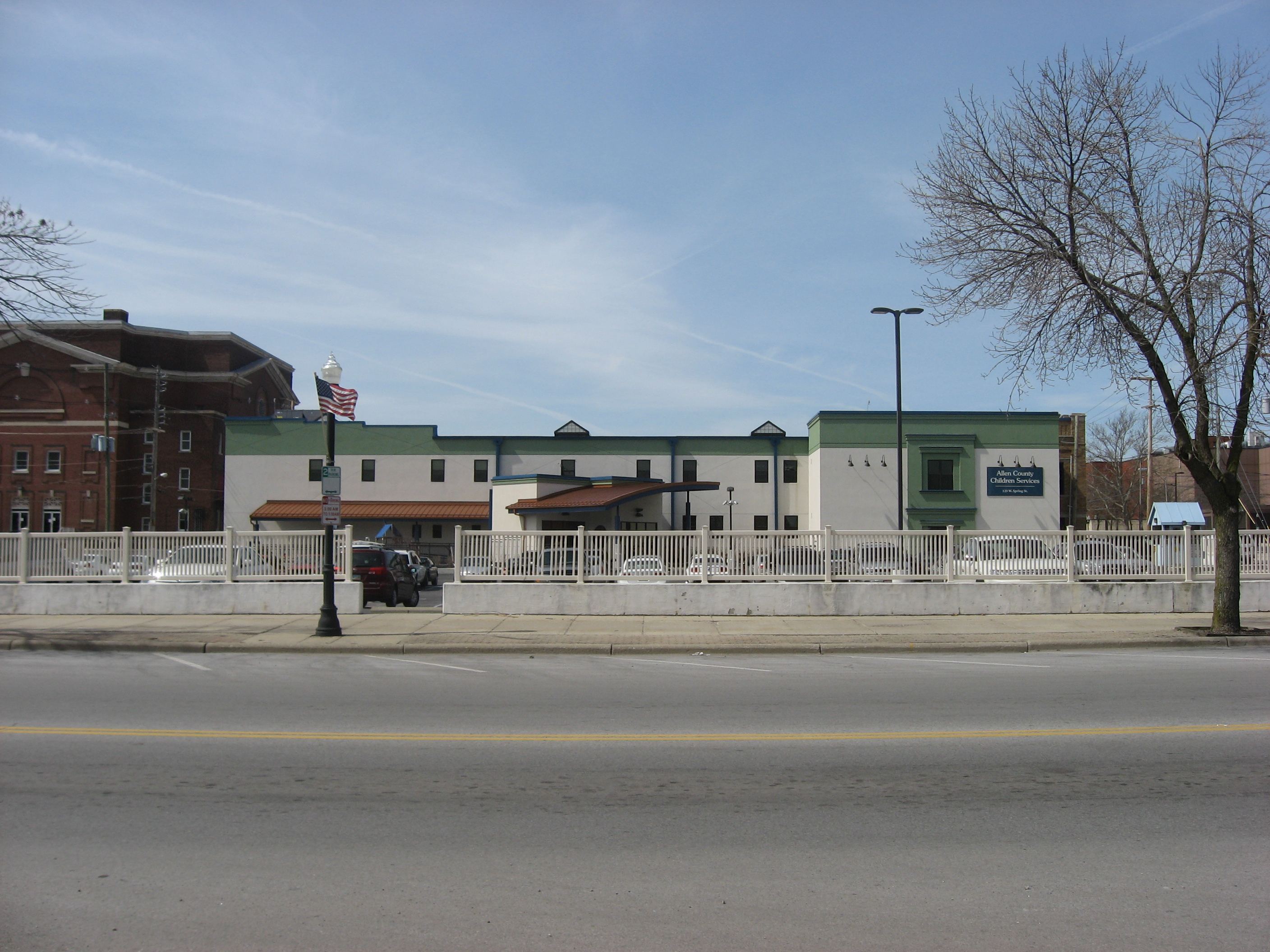
- Parking lot on the site of the Linneman Building

- Location within Ohio Location within the United States
- Location: 210-212 S. Main St., Lima, Ohio
- Coordinates: 40°44′15″N 84°6′20″W
- Area: less than one acre
- Built: 1899
- Architectural style: Late 19th and Early 20th Century American Movements
- MPS: Lima MRA
- NRHP reference No.: 82001867
- Added to NRHP: October 7, 1982

The Linneman Building was a historic commercial building in Lima, Ohio, United States. Located along South Main Street in the city's downtown, it was built in a transitional style of architecture in 1899. A two-story structure, it was constructed of brick arranged in an artistic style. Among its leading architectural features was a pair of large semicircular windows in the center of the building's facade; each window was decorated with a sash of aluminum, and the building was crowned with detailed stone carvings done in the style of the works of Louis Sullivan. In 1982, the building's stonework was rated as being equal to that of the adjacent Dorsey Building and superior to that of all other buildings in the city.

At the time when the Linneman Building was built, Lima was experiencing an economic boom as a result of the discovery of petroleum in the surrounding countryside. According to the 1900 census, the city's population was three times that reported by the 1880 census; consequently, a large number of ornate buildings were erected in the city's downtown. Leading among these structures is the Metropolitan Block on the downtown's northern side, but many buildings at the city's center and on the southern edge of downtown, including the Linneman Building, were also architecturally significant.

In 1982, the Linneman Building was listed on the National Register of Historic Places in recognition of its architectural significance. Another sixteen buildings in and around downtown Lima were added to the Register at the same time as part of the "Lima Multiple Resource Area," including the adjacent Dorsey Building. Today, the Linneman Building remains listed on the National Register, but it has been demolished. A parking lot now occupies the site of the ornate nineteenth-century structure.
