= Andrew Adgate =

American music director

Andrew Adgate (22 March 1762 in Norwich, Connecticut – 30 September 1793 in Philadelphia, Pennsylvania) was a musician, music director, and author from Philadelphia, Pennsylvania.

He is noted for founding the Institution for Encouragement of Church Music in Philadelphia, Pennsylvania in 1784, which became the Free School for Spreading the Knowledge of Vocal Music the following year. He directed choral concerts in Philadelphia from 1785 through 1793, performing both European and American works. He also founded the Uranian Academy in 1787.

== Works ==
- Rudiments of Music
- Philadelphia Harmony
- Selection of Sacred Harmony
