= Lima Cleaning and Pressing Company Building =

- Lima Cleaning and Pressing Company
- U.S. National Register of Historic Places
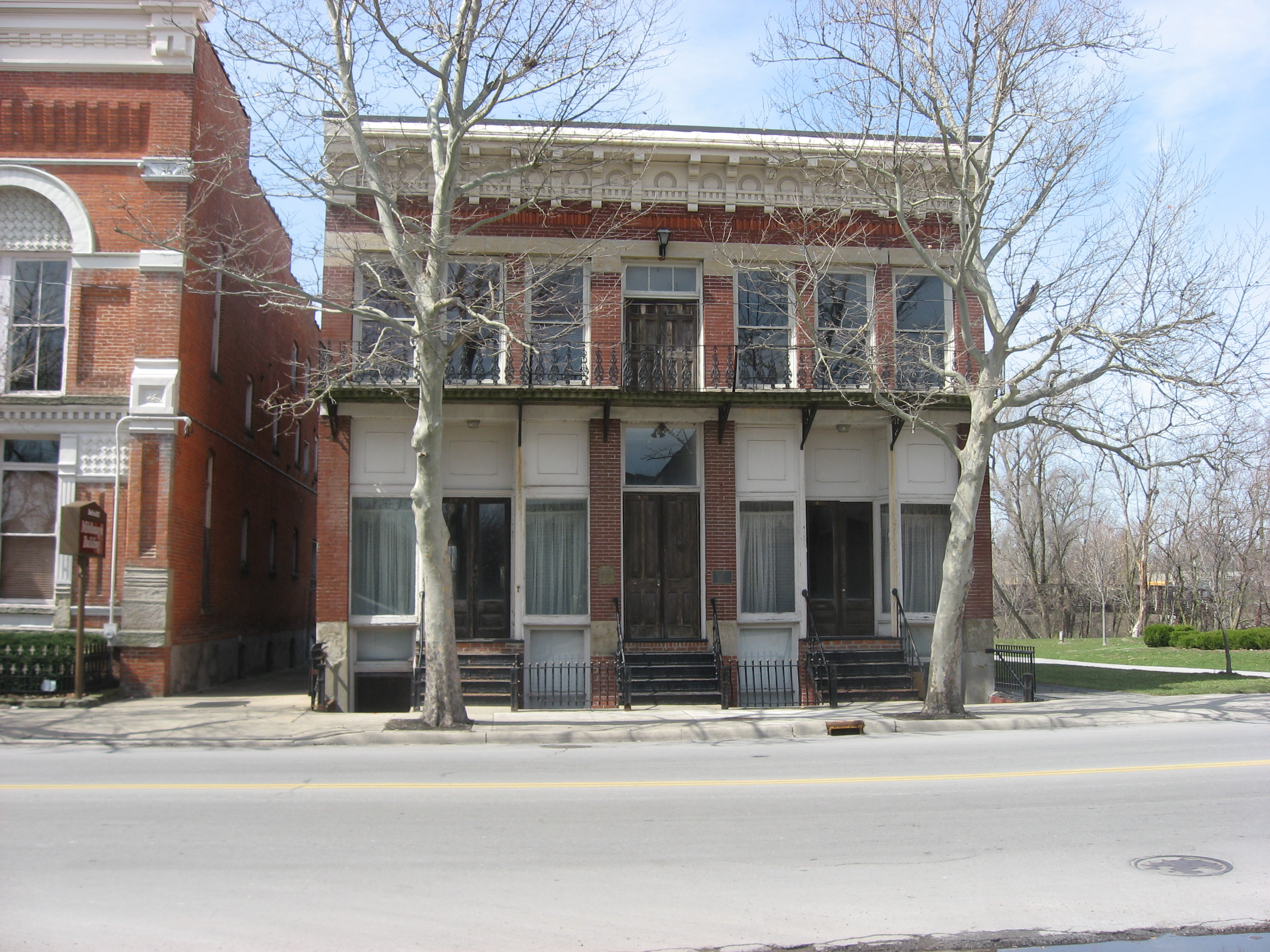
- Front of the building

- Location within Ohio Location within the United States
- Location: 436-438 S. Main St., Lima, Ohio
- Coordinates: 40°44′7″N 84°6′19″W
- Area: less than one acre
- Built: 1890
- Architectural style: Early Commercial
- MPS: Lima MRA
- NRHP reference No.: 82001353
- Added to NRHP: October 7, 1982

The Lima Cleaning and Pressing Company Building was a historic structure located along South Main Street in Lima, Ohio, United States. Built in 1890, it was an example of an early style of commercial architecture.

== Architecture ==
A small two-story brick building, the Lima Cleaning and Pressing Company Building had a facade three bays wide; possible storefronts, changed little from the original construction, were included on each side. Between the entrances to the two portions of the building is an entrance to stairs to the upper floor, and stairs to the basement level could be found on each side; all of these stairways were accompanied by iron railings. A unique wrought iron railing lined the edge of a second-story balcony, which could be accessed from the second floor by an elaborate double door. Each of these aspects of the building, as well as details such as transoms and a heavily detailed cornice, distinguished it from all other buildings in the city — no other Lima building featured such cunningly made ironwork.

== Construction ==
After the discovery of petroleum in the vicinity of Lima in 1885, the city's population grew greatly, and the construction of commercial buildings along South Main Street proceeded at a rapid pace. Accompanying these new buildings in the southern Kibby Corners neighborhood were large numbers of frame houses erected as homes for the workers in the city's burgeoning industrial enterprises. For many years, the Lima Cleaning and Pressing Company Building served as offices for dry cleaners and for plumbers.

== Preservation ==
Today, much of South Main Street and Kibby Corners languish in a state of decay. Many abandoned buildings have been demolished by the city government, and community areas such as parks and streetsides are becoming less attractive as a result of a lack of proper maintenance. Two exceptions to this process of decay are the Lima Cleaning and Pressing Company Building and the adjacent Armory-Latisona Building; these two historic buildings have been identified as key to the area's historic nature.

In 1982, the Armory-Latisona Building and the Lima Cleaning and Pressing Company Building were two of seventeen buildings in Lima that were added to the National Register of Historic Places as part of the "Lima Multiple Resource Area."

The building was demolished in the summer of 2015, but remains of the Register.
