= Lima Memorial Hall =

- U.S. National Register of Historic Places
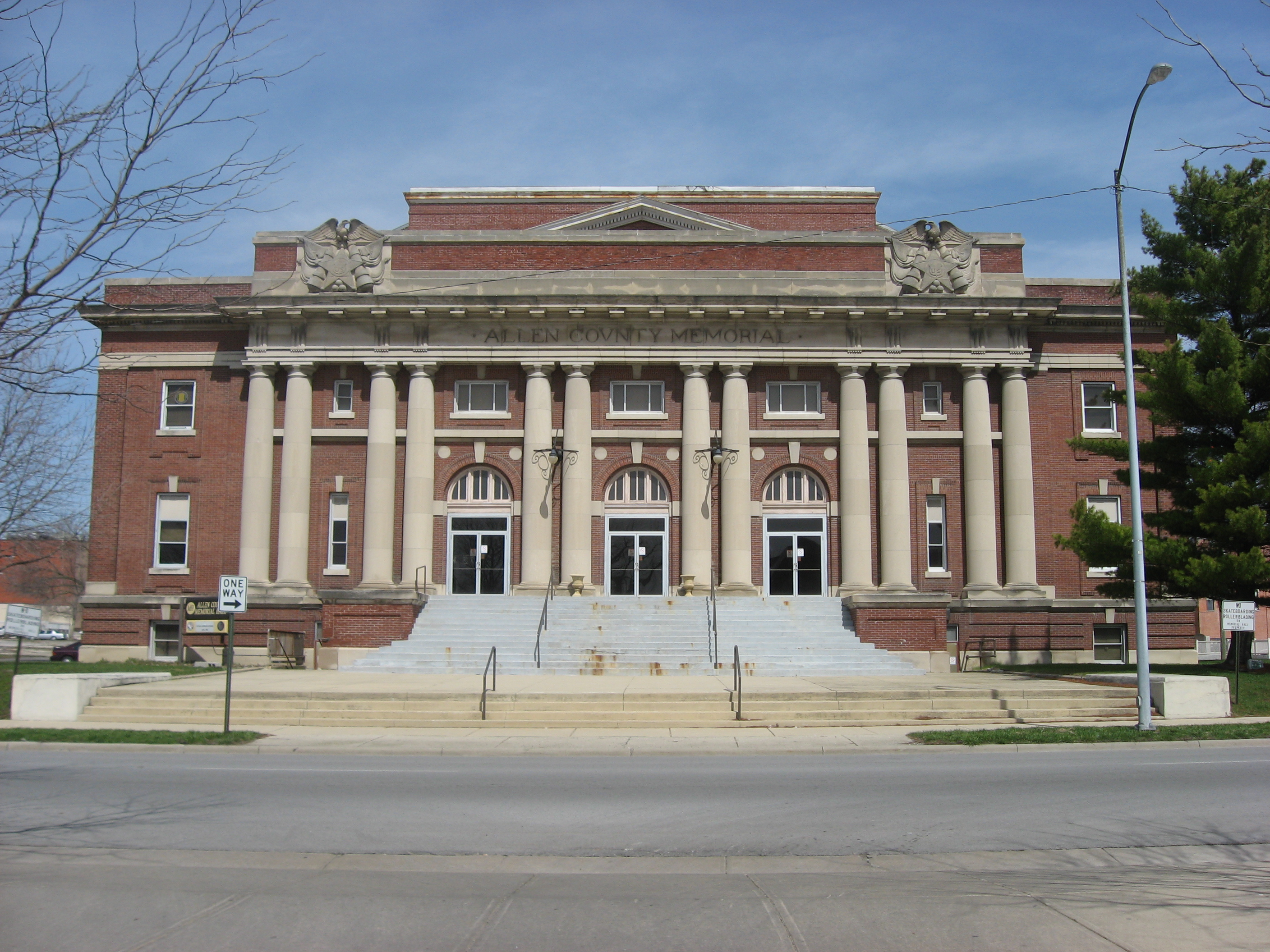
- Front of Memorial Hall

- Location within Ohio Location within the United States
- Location: W. Elm and S. Elizabeth Sts., Lima, Ohio
- Coordinates: 40°44′15″N 84°6′23″W
- Area: 0 acres (0 ha)
- Built: 1908
- Architect: Dawson & McLaughlin
- Architectural style: Beaux Arts
- NRHP reference No.: 79001779
- Added to NRHP: May 7, 1979

The Lima Memorial Hall is a historic performing arts center and city hall on the edge of downtown Lima, Ohio, United States. Designed by the architectural company of Dawson & McLaughlin and named for local military veterans, the Beaux-Arts building was built in 1908. A dominating aspect of its architecture is the massive marble staircase that rises from the foyer to a second-floor open balcony.

As a performing arts center, Memorial Hall has hosted concerts by John Philip Sousa's band, Victor Borge, the Detroit Symphony Orchestra, and singers from the Boston and Chicago opera companies. It no longer serves as the city hall; the municipal offices are now located on Public Square at the center of the city.

The building was featured in the August 1911 issue of The Ohio Architect, Engineer, and Builder magazine "to illustrate the work of the architectural firm, Dawson and McLaughlin....It is a handsome example of Beaux Arts Classicism."

In 1979, Memorial Hall was listed on the National Register of Historic Places. Both its architecture and its contribution to local history were significant enough to qualify it for listing by themselves. As of 1979, the building had not ever been expanded, but its entry doors and its windows were all replaced in 1971.
