= Martin and Kibby Blocks =

- Martin Block and Kibby Block
- U.S. National Register of Historic Places
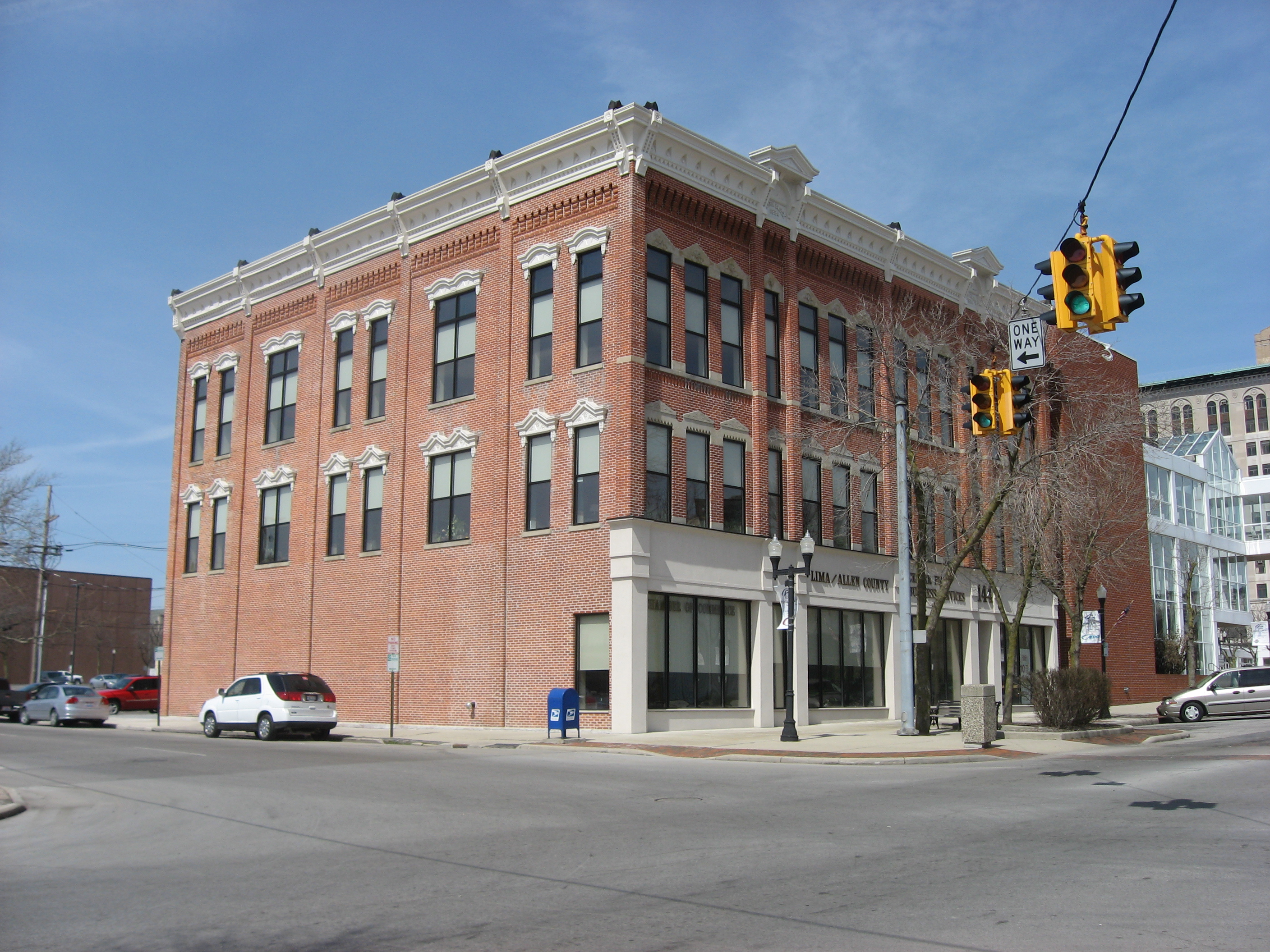
- Front and southern side of the blocks

- Location within Ohio Location within the United States
- Location: 140-146 S. Main St., Lima, Ohio
- Coordinates: 40°44′19″N 84°6′19″W
- Area: less than one acre
- Built: 1884
- Architectural style: Victorian Gothic
- MPS: Lima MRA
- NRHP reference No.: 82001868
- Added to NRHP: October 7, 1982

The Martin and Kibby Blocks are a pair of historic buildings in downtown Lima, Ohio, United States. Erected in 1884, they are brick structures built in the Victorian Gothic style of architecture. Both buildings are rectangular structures, three-stories tall, and topped with sloped roofs of asphalt. Among the decorative elements present on these buildings are brick pilasters next to the main entrances, stone lintels around the windows, and decorative corbelling between the structural brackets.

Contemporary to the construction of the two blocks was the discovery of petroleum in the vicinity of Lima and the consequent rapid growth of the city. A large number of significant commercial buildings were erected in the city at this time, including the Martin and Kibby Blocks and several other major commercial buildings along South Main Street near the city's central square.

In 1982, the Martin and Kibby Blocks were listed on the National Register of Historic Places in recognition of their historically significant architecture. Many other Lima buildings, including six others on South Main, were added to the Register at the same time as part of the "Lima Multiple Resource Area," a collection of downtown buildings important because of their architecture.
