= Dorsey Building =

- U.S. National Register of Historic Places
- Location within Ohio Location within the United States
- Location: 208 S. Main St., Lima, Ohio
- Coordinates: 40°44′16″N 84°6′20″W
- Area: less than one acre
- Built: 1899
- Architect: Emory H. Dorsey
- Architectural style: Late 19th and Early 20th Century American Movements
- MPS: Lima MRA
- NRHP reference No.: 82001350
- Added to NRHP: October 7, 1982

The Dorsey Building was a historic commercial building in Lima, Ohio, United States. Located along South Main Street in the city's downtown, it was built in a transitional style of architecture in 1899. Among its most distinguishing features was elaborate stonework, which was deemed equal to that of the adjacent Linneman Building and superior to that of all other Lima buildings. Like the Linneman Building and several other buildings on South Main, the Dorsey Building was constructed during a period of great prosperity in Lima: the railroad industry was expanding, and the discovery of petroleum in the vicinity had led to an economic boom in the city's economy.

In 1982, the Dorsey Building was listed on the National Register of Historic Places for its architectural significance. It was one of seventeen buildings in and around downtown Lima to be added to the Register at the same time as part of the "Lima Multiple Resource Area." Six of the other sixteen were located along South Main, including the buildings adjacent to the Dorsey on both north and south.

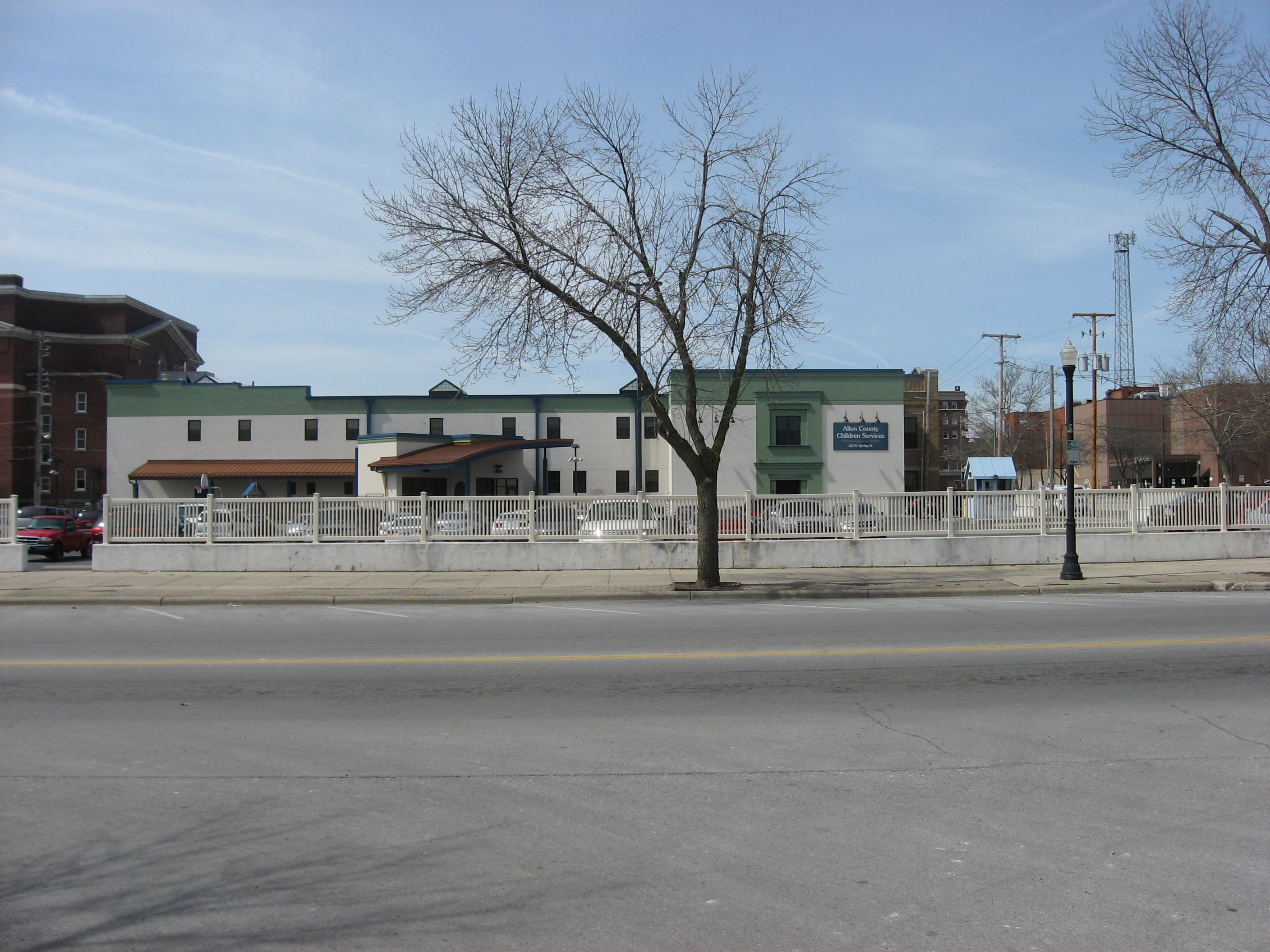
Site of the Dorsey Building in 2010

Today, the Dorsey Building remains listed on the Register, but the building has been demolished; in its place sits a parking lot.
