= Adgate Block =

- U.S. National Register of Historic Places
- Location within Ohio Location within the United States
- Location: 300-306 S. Main St., Lima, Ohio
- Coordinates: 40°44′13″N 84°6′20″W
- Area: Less than 1 acre (0.40 ha)
- Built: 1880
- Architect: B.F. Matthews, C.S. Lathrop
- Architectural style: Late Victorian, Romanesque
- MPS: Lima MRA
- NRHP reference No.: 82001347
- Added to NRHP: October 7, 1982

The Adgate Block was a historic building in Lima, Ohio, United States. Built in 1880, it was listed on the National Register of Historic Places in 1982 as part of the Lima Multiple Resource Area. The brick building was constructed in a combination of the Victorian and Romanesque Revival styles. During its history, the building was occupied by a series of businesses, including a pharmacy, a specialty store, and a pizzeria.

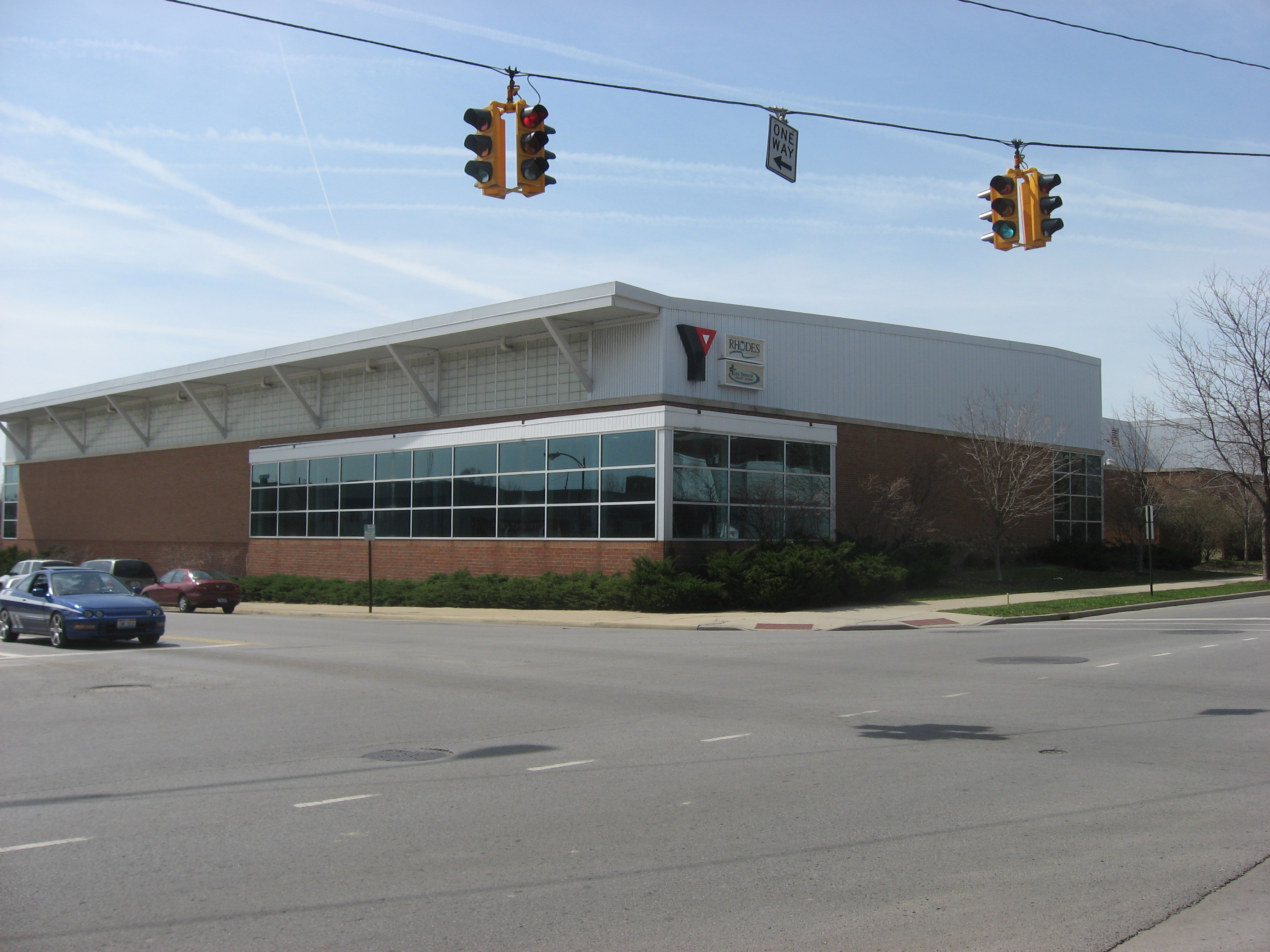
Photo of site in 2010

Although the block has been destroyed and a new YMCA constructed in its place, it remains listed on the National Register.
