= Ohio Theatre (Lima, Ohio) =

- U.S. National Register of Historic Places
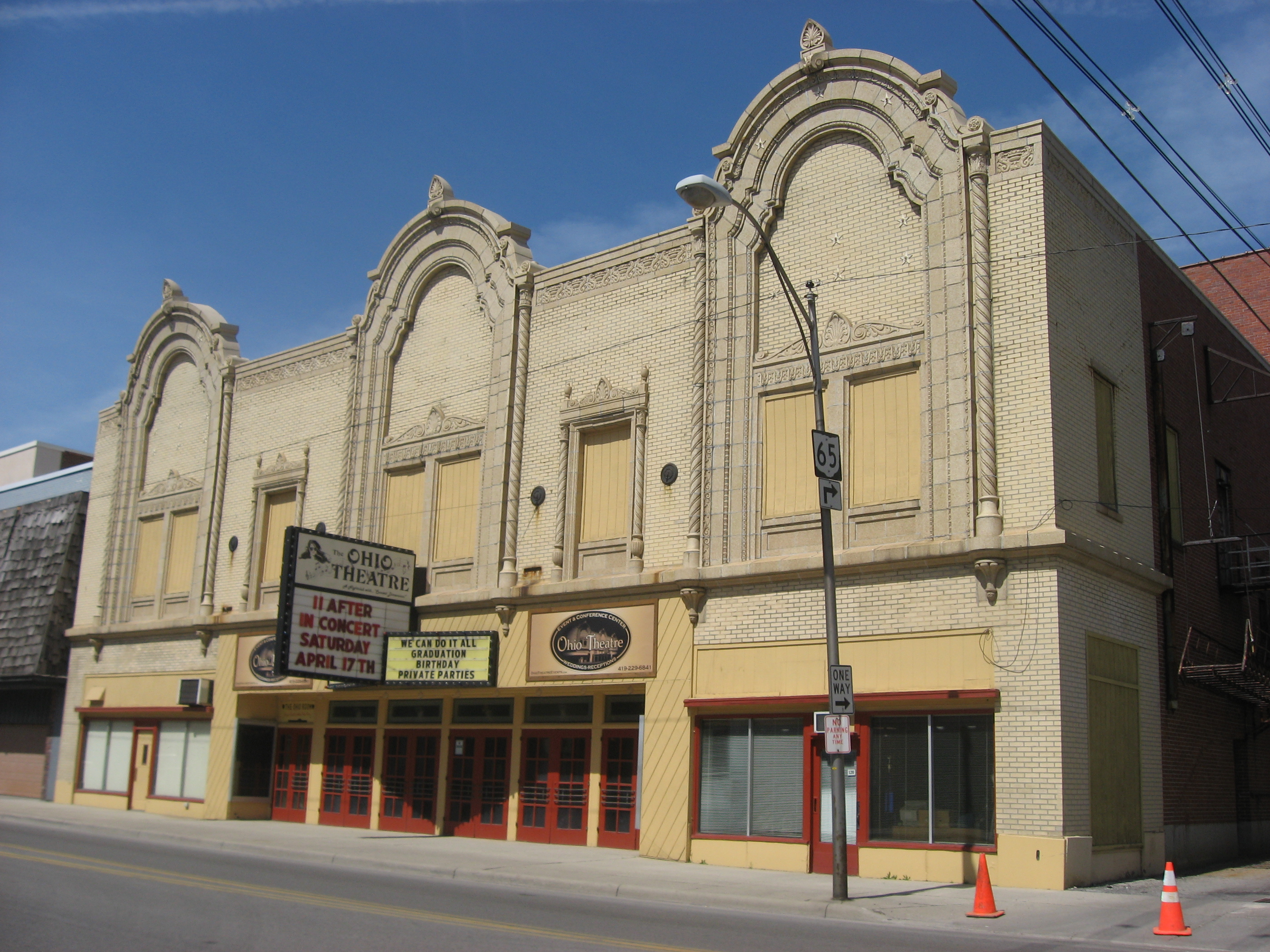
- Front of the Ohio Theatre

- Location within Ohio Location within the United States
- Location: 122 W. North St., Lima, Ohio
- Coordinates: 40°44′34″N 84°6′22″W
- Area: less than one acre
- Built: 1927
- Architect: Multiple
- Architectural style: Churrigueresque
- MPS: Lima MRA
- NRHP reference No.: 82001866
- Added to NRHP: October 7, 1982

The Ohio Theatre is a historic movie theater in downtown Lima, Ohio, United States. Built in 1927, the theater is a brick and concrete structure featuring multiple architectural styles. Outside, large amounts of terracotta details produce a Churrigueresque appearance, while Corinthian columns, marble and mosaic floors, and a massive chandelier produce an Italianate interior.

A movie palace constructed for the Schine Corporation, the theater was built at a time when improvements in transportation increased Lima's significance in the lives of those living in surrounding communities. As cars became more widely available and various means of public transportation became more viable, Lima became a center of daily life for many residents of rural northwestern Ohio, and many theaters such as the Ohio were built to serve them. In addition to its original purpose, the Ohio Theatre has served to host stage performances by a wide range of entertainers. Individuals as well known as Bob Hope have graced the theater's ornate interior.

In 1982, the Ohio Theatre was listed on the National Register of Historic Places as part of a collection of buildings designated the "Lima Multiple Resource Area." Designated as historic sites because of their architecture, these buildings were deemed worthy of historic preservation primarily because of the city's architectural history: although Lima had once been home to a large number of architecturally valuable buildings, an unusually large percentage of them had been destroyed or abandoned to ruin.
