= Allen County Courthouse (Ohio) =

Local government building in the United States

- U.S. National Register of Historic Places
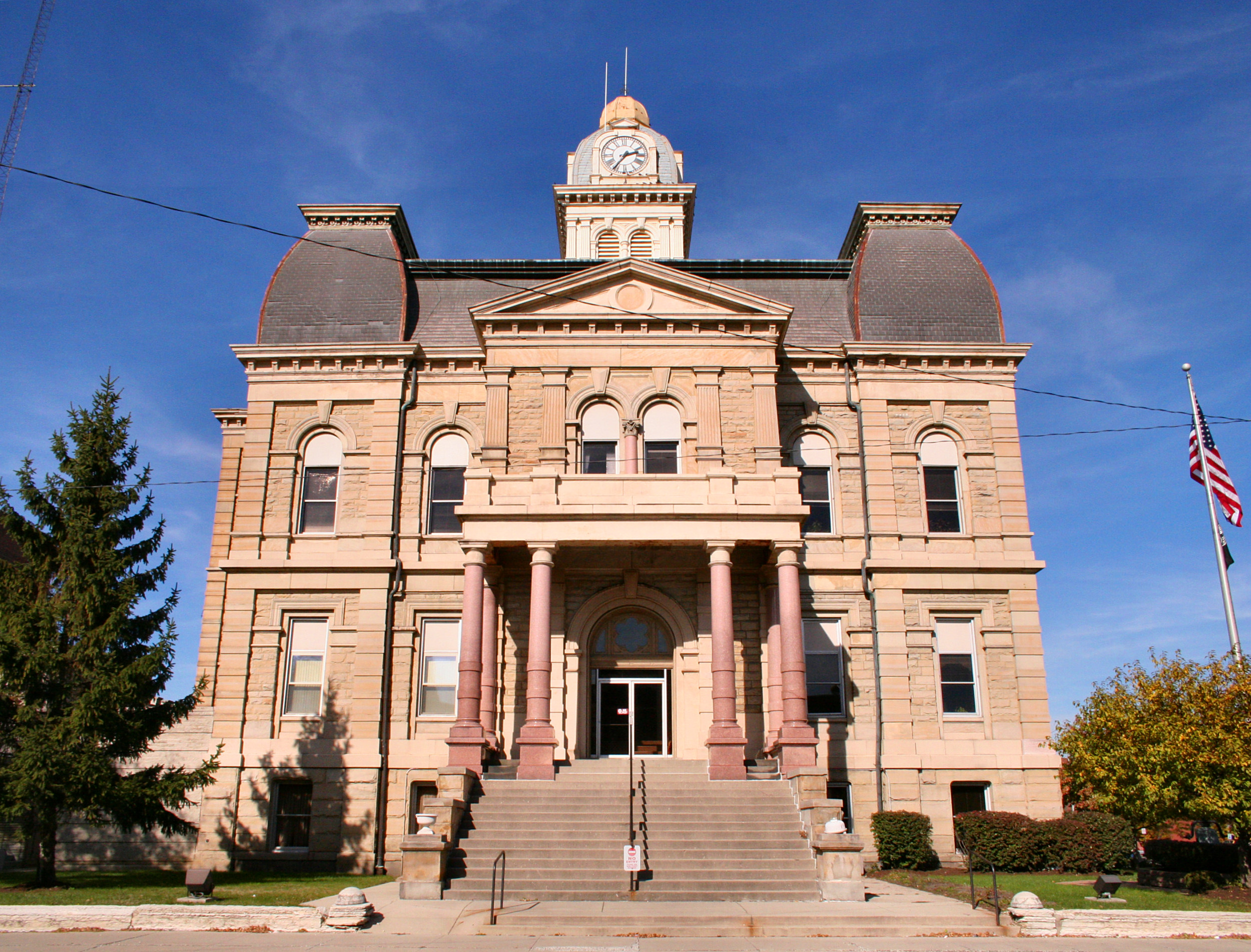
- Allen County Courthouse Main Entrance

- Location within Ohio Location within the United States
- Interactive map showing the location of Allen County Courthouse
- Location: Lima, Ohio
- Coordinates: 40°44′34″N 84°6′20″W
- Built: 1881
- Architect: George H. Maetzel
- Architectural style: Second Empire
- NRHP reference No.: 74001392
- Added to NRHP: July 24, 1974

The Allen County Courthouse is an historic courthouse building located at the corner of North Main Street & East North Street in Lima, Ohio, United States. In 1974, it was added to the National Register of Historic Places.

== History ==
Allen County was formed in 1820 and Lima was selected as the county seat. The first courthouse was a simple log structure consisting of two floors, a small hipped roof and a single chimney. The courthouse served the county until 1840 when the county realized the space was not adequate for the growing population. A contest was announced and seventeen bids were submitted. The contract was awarded to Orlando Boughton and was designed in the Classical Revival style. The amount was $13,325 and construction was underway.

The courthouse was two stories tall and was built out of brick and stone. Pilasters lined the facade between the long windows with dark shutters. The entrance was framed with four fluted Doric columns supporting a portico. A square drum rose from the roof and supported large rectangular windows capped with a dome ending in a weather vane. The tower contained a large bell which rang periodically through the years, including the 14th of April in 1865 in honor of the slain president, Abraham Lincoln.

The courthouse standing today is the county's third. It was built between 1881 and 1884 at a cost of $360,000 by architect George H. Maetzel. The courthouse was designed in the Second Empire style, popular at the time.

== Exterior ==
The stone foundation is smooth sandstone. The ground floor has recessed rectangular windows. The southern center pavilion projects from the facade and is flanked by mansard-roofed towers which used to be topped with windows. A statue of an eagle once topped the pediment.

The main entrance is reached by a flight of stairs and a small landing leading to a story arch. The windows of the main floor are high rectangular panels, the windows on the floor above are high arched panes. Above the main entrance rises a pediment that was once topped by the statue of Justice.

The tower rises above the roof and consists of two bases stacked one on top the other. A dome with a four faced clock sits on the base. The dome narrows to a small spire.

In the 1990s the courthouse was remodeled and updated. At this time the new Justice Center was built next door. The two buildings are connected by an overhead walkway. The new addition was constructed in the same colors to match the courthouse and houses a jail, several courtrooms and the sheriff's administrative offices.
