= Oregon State University College of Engineering =

- Type: Public engineering school
- Established: 1889
- Parent institution: Oregon State University
- Accreditation: ABET
- Dean: Forrest J. Masters
- Students: 10,978
- Undergraduates: +9,500
- Location: Corvallis, Oregon, U.S. 44.5672°N 123.2748°W
- Colors: Orange and black
- Website: engineering.oregonstate.edu

Oregon State University's College of Engineering is the engineering college of Oregon State University, a public research university in Corvallis, Oregon. By enrollment, the college is the largest at the university and the fifth-largest engineering college in the United States as of 2025.

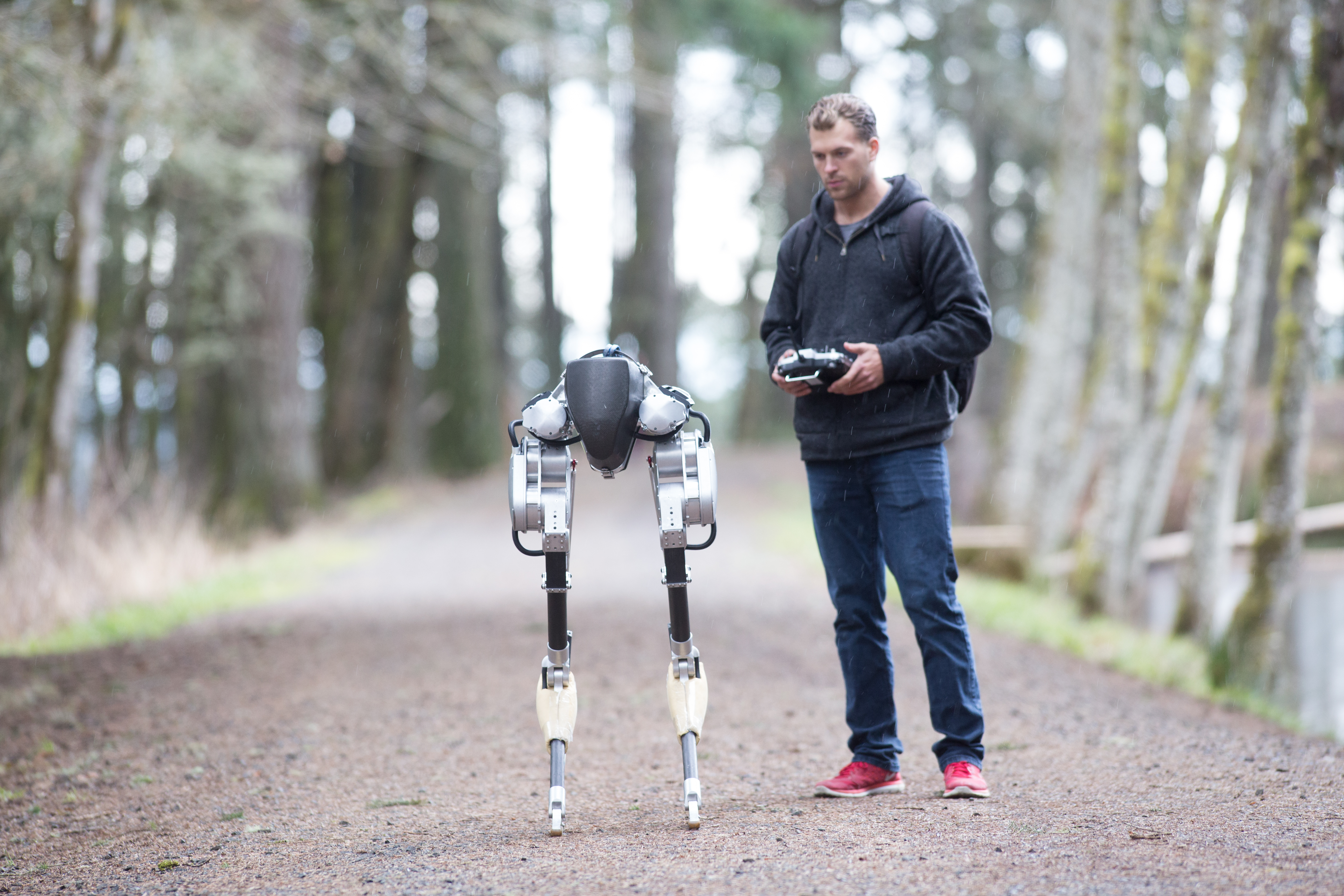
Oregon State University College of Engineering students built a bipedal robot they named Cassie. The robot has since set a world record for the 100-meter dash.

== History ==
The college's first professorship, exclusively in engineering, was awarded to Grant Adelbert Covell in 1889. That same year, Covell founded the OSU Department of Mechanical Engineering and organized the construction of the first engineering building, Mechanical Hall. Although degrees in civil engineering were awarded by OSU as early as the 1870s, the college was not officially chartered until 1889. The first departments were established in electrical (1897), mining (1904), and civil (1905) engineering over the college's initial 20 years. Mechanical Hall burned down in 1889 but was rebuilt soon after. Later, in 1920, the building was renamed Apperson Hall. In 1908, the college's name changed to the OSU School of Engineering. Covell served as the school's first dean.

Oregon State University became the only public university in the state to offer accredited degrees in all major engineering fields. OSU was designated Oregon's engineering university by the State Board of Higher Education in 1914, to provide the university a distinct curriculum among Oregon universities. Chemical engineering was incorporated into the college as a formal department in 1932, followed by industrial engineering in 1943, nuclear engineering in 1968 and computer science in 1974. In 2021, Oregon State became first university in the United States to offer both master’s and doctoral degrees in artificial intelligence.

Since its opening, the college of engineering has seen a continued expansion of classrooms and laboratories. Through the 1900s, the college added a new building to campus nearly every decade: Merryfield Hall (1909), Batcheller Hall (1913), Graf Hall (1920), Covell Hall (1928), Dearborn Hall (1949), Gleeson Hall (1955), the Radiation Center (1963), Rogers Hall (1967), Owen Hall (1988).

In 1955 J. Robert Oppenheimer visited the college to give two historic lectures in nuclear physics on the "Constitution of Matter". The visit to the college was not without controversy. Leaders at the University of Washington canceled his planned lecture at their campus due to J. Edgar Hoover's accusations Oppenheimer participated in pro-communist activities. Recordings of his two lectures at the college are now stored in Washington, D.C. at the Library of Congress.

In 2008, Apperson Hall received a major remodel and was renamed Kearney Hall.

The College of Engineering claims over 35,000 graduates since its founding in 1889.

== Schools ==
- Chemical, Biological, and Environmental Engineering
- Civil and Construction Engineering
- Electrical Engineering and Computer Science
- Mechanical, Industrial, and Manufacturing Engineering
- Nuclear Science and Engineering

== Enrollment ==
As of Fall 2022, there were over 9,800 students enrolled in the college of engineering at the Corvallis campus. The college of engineering's faculty is made up of approximately 122 members whose time is split between teaching and research. The college's operational budget for the 2022–2023 school year was $128.2 million with $64.6 million from research grants and $19.4 million from private donors.

Computer science (CS) students set a new record in 2022. CS students were awarded more CS degrees than any other engineering college in the nation.

== Research ==
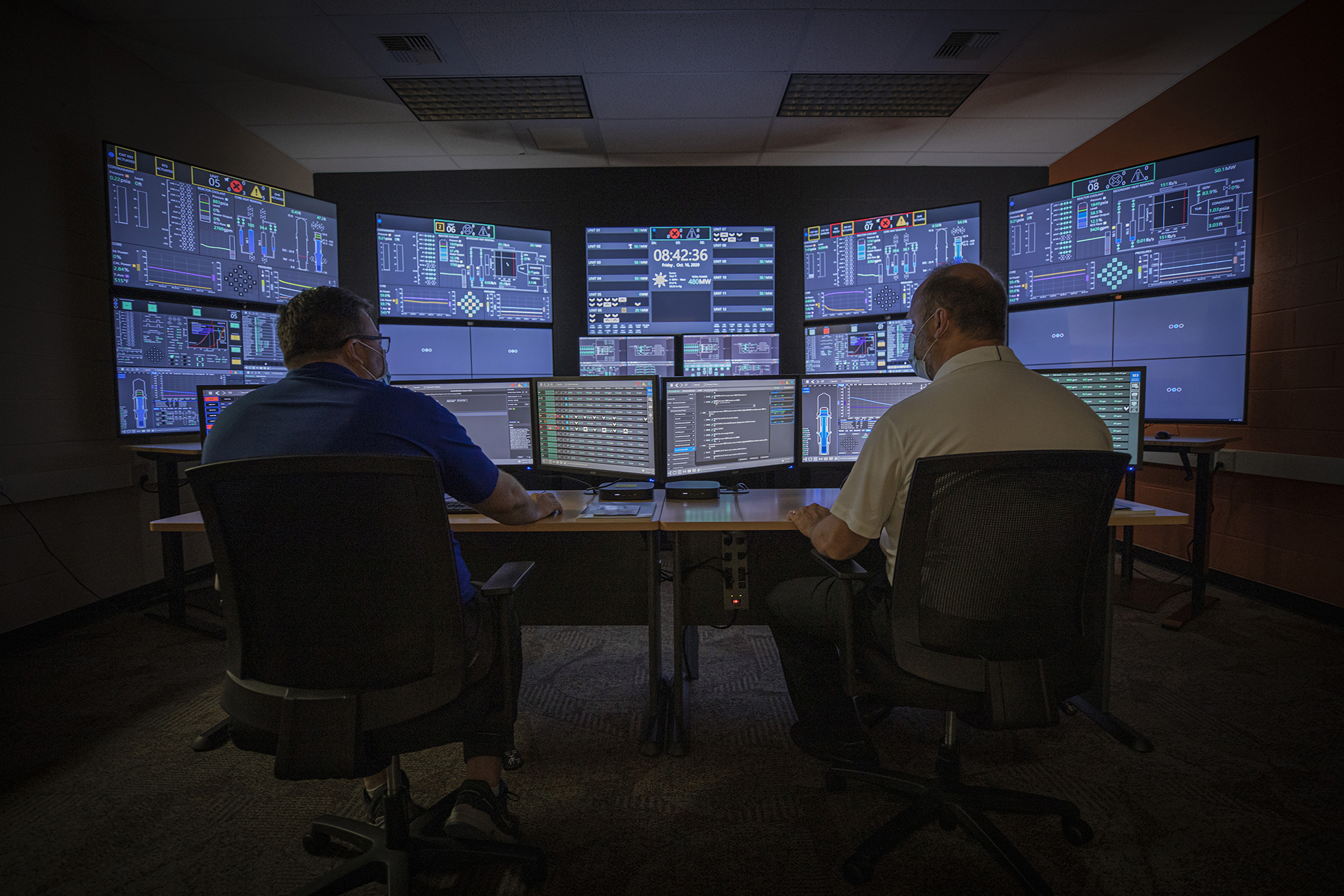
Inside the E2 Center's SMR plant simulator at OSU (photo by NuScale Power)

A team of scientists from OSU's Nuclear Science and Engineering school developed a prototype small modular reactor (SMR), funded by the Department of Energy under the Nuclear Energy Research Initiative program. This concept was later refined further, and NuScale Power was formed in 2007 to commercialize OSU's prototype as the NuScale Power Module, used in their VOYGR power plants. As of 2026, NuScale Power's VOYGR, VOYGR-4, and VOYGR-6 are the only SMRs approved by the Nuclear Regulatory Commission for operation in the US. SMR's are designed to power individual commercial operations, rather than entire cities. The third US-licensed SMR OSU and NuScale Power developed is the VOYGR-6. The SMR delivers up to 77 megawatts of energy (MWe) per module and can manage up to six modules to produce up to 462 MWe. OSU and NuScale Power are working with the Nuclear Regulatory Commission to offer increased power with a 77 MWe, 12-module reactor. The newly introduced VOYGR-12 will offer a maximum output of up to 924 MWe once licensed.

== Expansion ==
OSU engineering continues to expand its campus footprint to accommodate higher enrollments and the addition of new programs. A new 153,000-square-foot building was added to the campus in 2006. The Kelley Engineering Center is home to the school of electrical engineering and computer science. A major remodel was also completed to Kearney Hall in 2008. The renovation serves as home to the school of civil and construction management engineering.

College of engineering alumnus and Nvidia founder and CEO, Jen-Hsun "Jensen" Huang, is helping to build a $200 million research and education center planned for campus. The center will be named after the alumnus and his wife, Lori Huang, who are donating $50 million to the project. The Jen-Hsun and Lori Huang Collaborative Innovation Complex (CIC) will feature a massive AI supercomputer powered by nVIDIA hardware. The 150,000-square-foot center, due to open in 2026, will accelerate work at Oregon State's top-ranked engineering programs in computer sciences, robotics, materials sciences and other programs, outside of engineering, with the help of AI.

In 2023, the campus opened Johnson Hall. The hall is the new home for the school of chemical, biological, and environmental engineering. Peter Johnson and his wife, Rosalie, both alumni of the school, sponsored the new addition with a $7 million gift for its construction in 2016. The 58,000 square-foot building features an entryway plaza, modern offices, laboratory classrooms and open spaces for the school's faculty and students. Johnson invented a device and process used to manufacture longer-lasting lead-acid car batteries in 1980. He went on to found Tekmax Inc. in 1981.

== Notable alumni ==
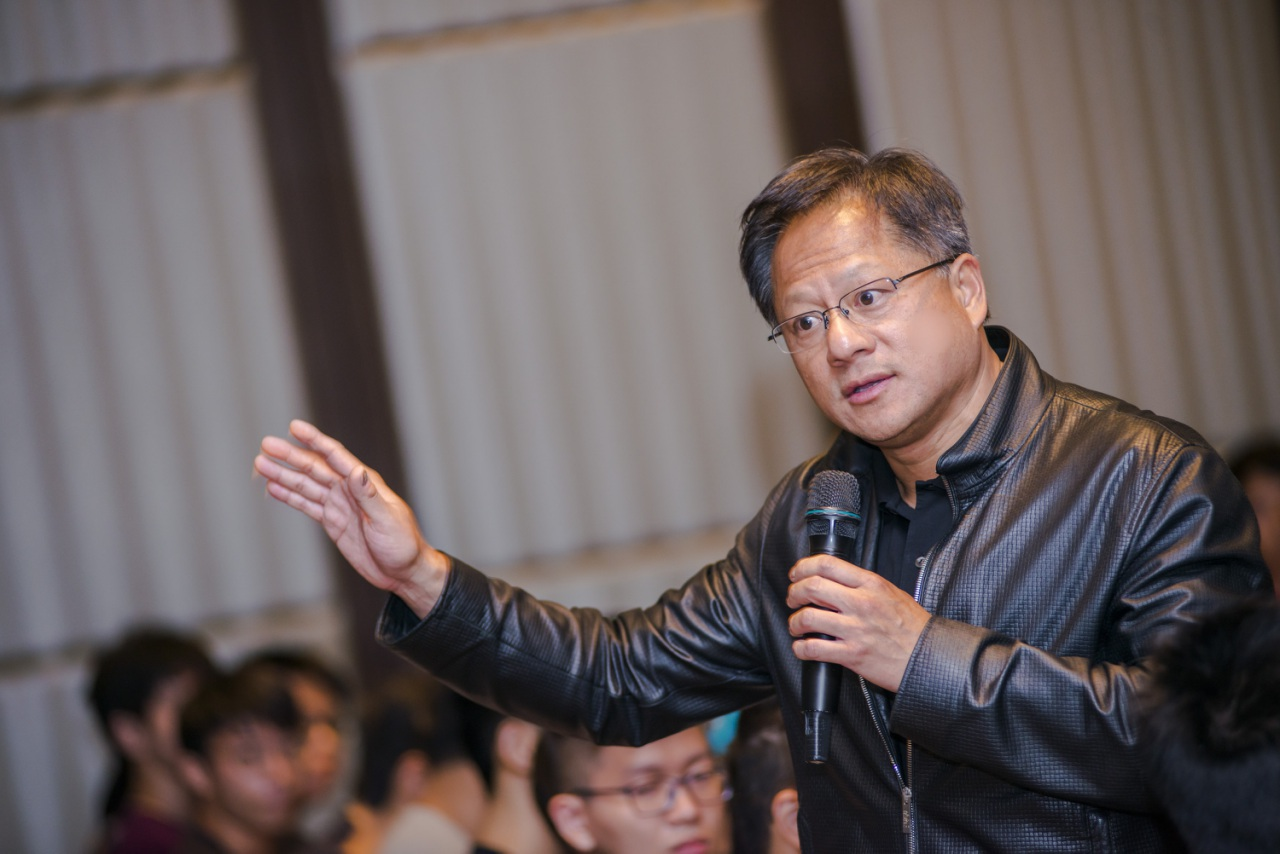
- Jen-Hsun Huang
  Thomas J. Autzen, electrical engineer, co-inventor of plywood manufacturing glue-spreader.
- Richard D. Braatz, researcher in control theory and its applications, Edwin R. Gilliland professor in chemical engineering at the Massachusetts Institute of Technology.
- George Bruns, an American composer of music for film and television with four Academy Award nominations and three Grammy Award nominations.
- Randy Conrads, Classmates.com founder.
- Howard D. Eberhart, American engineer and pioneer in the development of modern artificial limbs and other prosthetic devices. Served as a professor at the University of California, chaired the university's Department of Civil Engineering, and held membership in the National Academy of Engineering.
- Marion Eugene Carl, American military officer, World War II fighter ace, record-setting test pilot, and naval aviator.
- Meghna Chakrabarti, an American journalist and radio producer for National Public Radio. She is the host of NPR's On Point.
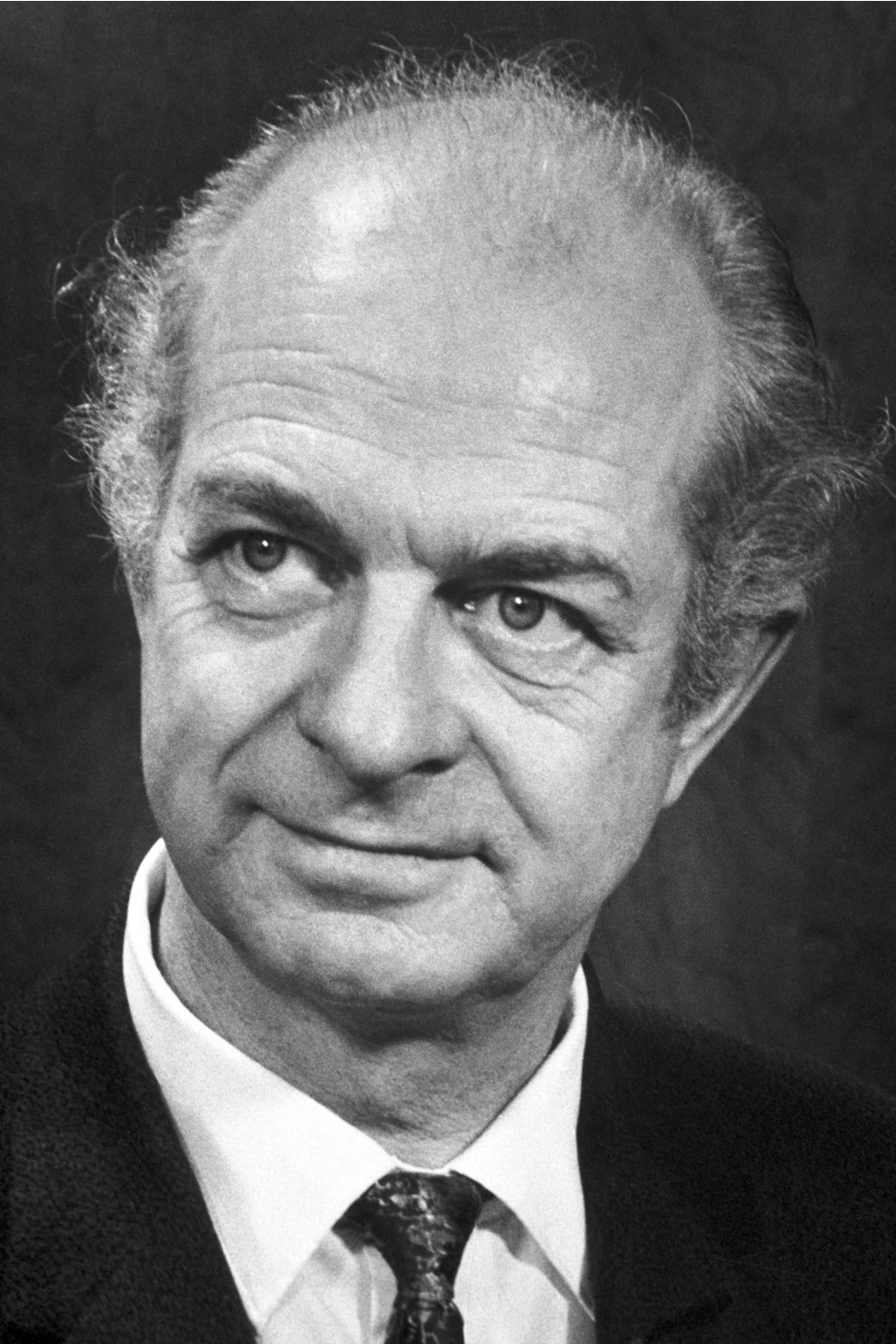
  Linus Pauling
- Holly Cornell, co-founder of international environmental engineering company CH2M.
- Miles Lowell Edwards, inventor of the first medically proven and adopted artificial heart valve.
- Douglas Engelbart, inventor of the computer mouse, 2000 National Medal of Technology.
- Paul Hugh Emmett, Chemical engineer who pioneered in catalysis, co-namesake of BET theory and member of the Manhattan Project.
- Dick Fosbury, best known for inventing the Fosbury flop, gold medalist in 1968 Olympics, co-owner of Galena Engineering, Inc. in Ketchum, Idaho.
- Peter Gassner, co-founder of Veeva Systems.
- Elmer E. Hall, US Marine Corps. commander of 8th Marine Regiment during the Battle of Tarawa.
- Milton Harris, founder of Harris Research Laboratories (known as Gillette today).
- Thomas Burke Hayes, co-founder of international environmental engineering company CH2M.
- James Howland, co-founder of international environmental engineering company CH2M.
- Jen-Hsun Huang, CEO/co-founder of nVIDIA Corp., National Academy of Engineering member.
- Glenn Jackson, former Oregon Transportation Commission chair and namesake of the Glenn L. Jackson Memorial Bridge.
- Tod A. Laursen, American mechanical engineer and professor, published over 100 peer-reviewed periodicals, including works on Computational Contact and Impact Mechanics, chancellor of American University of Sharjah, United Arab Emirates.
- Timothy S. Leatherman of Leatherman Tool Group, Inc.
- Conde McCullough, American civil engineer, known for designing many of Oregon's historic coastal bridges on U.S. Route 101.
- Roger Nichols, eight-time Grammy Award-winning recording engineer for many major musical artists of the 1970s-80s.
- William Oefelein, NASA Astronaut.
- Glenn Odekirk, Hughes Aircraft, aerospace engineer who helped design the H-4 Hercules. He is portrayed in the 2004 movie The Aviator as "Odie".
- Denys Overholser, American electrical engineer and stealth technology pioneer at Lockheed's Skunk Works who developed the mathematical methods for radar cross-section prediction that enabled the design of the F-117 Nighthawk.
- Hüsnü Özyeğin, founder of Finansbank in 1987 and one of Turkey's most successful bankers.
- Linus Pauling, 1954 Nobel Prize in Chemistry & 1962 Nobel Peace Prize recipient; the only person ever to win two unshared Nobel Prizes.
- Donald Pettit, NASA astronaut.
- Stephen O. Rice, pioneer in the related fields of information theory, communications theory, and telecommunications.
- Ada-Rhodes Short, mechatronic design engineer and transgender rights activist.
- Bert Sperling, author and researcher of cities.
- Frederick Steiwer, Oregon state senator, district attorney, and 1936 Republican presidential candidate.
- William Tebeau, first African-American male graduate (chemical engineering, 1948) and namesake of William Tebeau Residence Hall.
- Lee Arden Thomas, early Oregon architect known for designing landmark downtown buildings.
- Earl A. Thompson, American engineer and inventor credited with the invention of the synchromesh manual transmission in 1918.
- James K. Weatherford, Oregon attorney, judge, state politician, namesake of business school annex.
- John A. Young, former CEO of Hewlett-Packard.
- Peter C. Zimmerman, Oregon state senator and advocate for independently owned farms.

== Notable faculty ==
- Margaret Burnett, known for her pioneering work in human computer interaction and software engineering, specifically for developments in visual programming languages, end-user software engineering, and gender-inclusive software.
- Bob Glenn, a major figure in Western US highway and traffic engineering development, authored periodicals on highway and traffic engineering for 1920-1939 period and traffic efficiency for logging communities.
- Çetin Kaya Koç, credited with contributing to over 50 cryptographic hardware and software systems, including cryptographic layers for Rivest–Shamir–Adleman Reference Library.
- Octave Levenspiel, emeritus professor of chemical engineering at Oregon State University, author of five books, and member of the National Academy of Engineering
- Thomas G. Dietterich, awarded the 2025 AAAI Feigenbaum Prize by the Association for the Advancement of Artificial Intelligence (AAAI).
