= Steve Cook (pool player) =

American pool player (1946–2003)

Steve Cook (December 31, 1946 – October 21, 2003), was an American professional player and instructor of pocket billiards (pool). He is best known for the extremely challenging game of one-pocket, which Cook described as "the pool game for strategical and creative abilities." He was nicknamed "Cookie Monster", and due to his unassuming appearance hiding world-class talent, "the Clark Kent of one-pocket". Cook was inducted into the One Pocket Hall of Fame in 2005. World champion Allen Hopkins said Cook was one of the best One-Pocket players in the world in the 1970s.

== Early life ==
As a child, born in Lima, Ohio, Cook suffered debilitating bone deterioration in his right hip, from ages 5 to 10, preventing him from playing running sports, and leading to a focus on hand–eye coordination games. By his teens, Cook was a local champion at table tennis and golf (also winning the National Putter Tournament at 15), as well an accomplished bowler. He did not begin playing pool until age 14, but soon focused all of his sporting attention on the game. By 19, Cook had attracted a pro, Danny Jones, to play him in an exhibition match, and went on to place 23rd at his first Stardust Open Championship at the Stardust Resort & Hotel in Las Vegas, Nevada.

He managed a pool hall in Springfield, Ohio, and in 1968 moved to Tampa, Florida where he ran Dale Mabry Billiards with his friend and one-pocket mentor Lewis Alexander Goff for several years.

== Professional career ==
in that era the premier one-pocket event. He was both One-pocket and All-around Champion at the 1970 Stardust Open event, at the age of 23. He competed in other events throughout the 1970s, including the US Open.

After many years of victories in other events, Cook took the 1991 Legends of One Pocket Championship in Philadelphia (and was runner-up in that year's earlier Legends event in Columbia, SC), and later went on to win the 1993 Los Angeles Open. The 1991 victory made him one of only two players to ever win both the Stardust and Legends of One Pocket titles.

Aside from competing professionally, Cook served as the manager and house pro at Varsity Billiard Room in Tampa from the early 1970s to 1996, In this capacity, Steve did as much as he could to promote the game of pocket billiards. He would give one-pocket lessons at Varsity Billiards for $10.00 per hour. Most other professional players would charge $1000.00 a session for lessons.

Cook was also one of a number of contributing authors to the one-pocket book Shots, Moves and Strategies: As Taught by the Game's Greatest Players (edited by Eddie Robin), now a highly sought-after collector's item.

== Titles ==
- 1970 Stardust Open One Pocket Championship
- 1970 Stardust Open All-Around Championship
- 1970 Birmingham Open One Pocket
- 1972 Hoosier Open 14.1 Championship
- 1973 Hoosier Open 14.1 Championship
- 1974 Southeastern Open 9-Ball
- 1974 Wisconsin Open 14.1
- 1979 Citrus Open 9-Ball
- 1980 Birmingham Open 9-Ball
- 1984 Florida State 9-Ball
- 1987 Pool Room Open 9-Ball
- 1988 Citrus Open 9-Ball
- 1991 Legends of One Pocket Championship
- 1993 Los Angeles Open One Pocket Championship
- 1996 Florida State One Pocket Championship
- 2005 One Pocket Hall of Fame

== Later life ==
In 1996, Cook returned to Lima, Ohio, to care for his mother after she suffered a stroke. He continued playing in the Midwest, and occasionally in major events in Las Vegas and elsewhere.

At the age of 56 he died in his sleep on October 21, 2003, in his hometown of Lima, of causes that were not disclosed in his obituary.
