= Michael Pitts (pastor) =

American pastor, preacher, and author (born 1964)

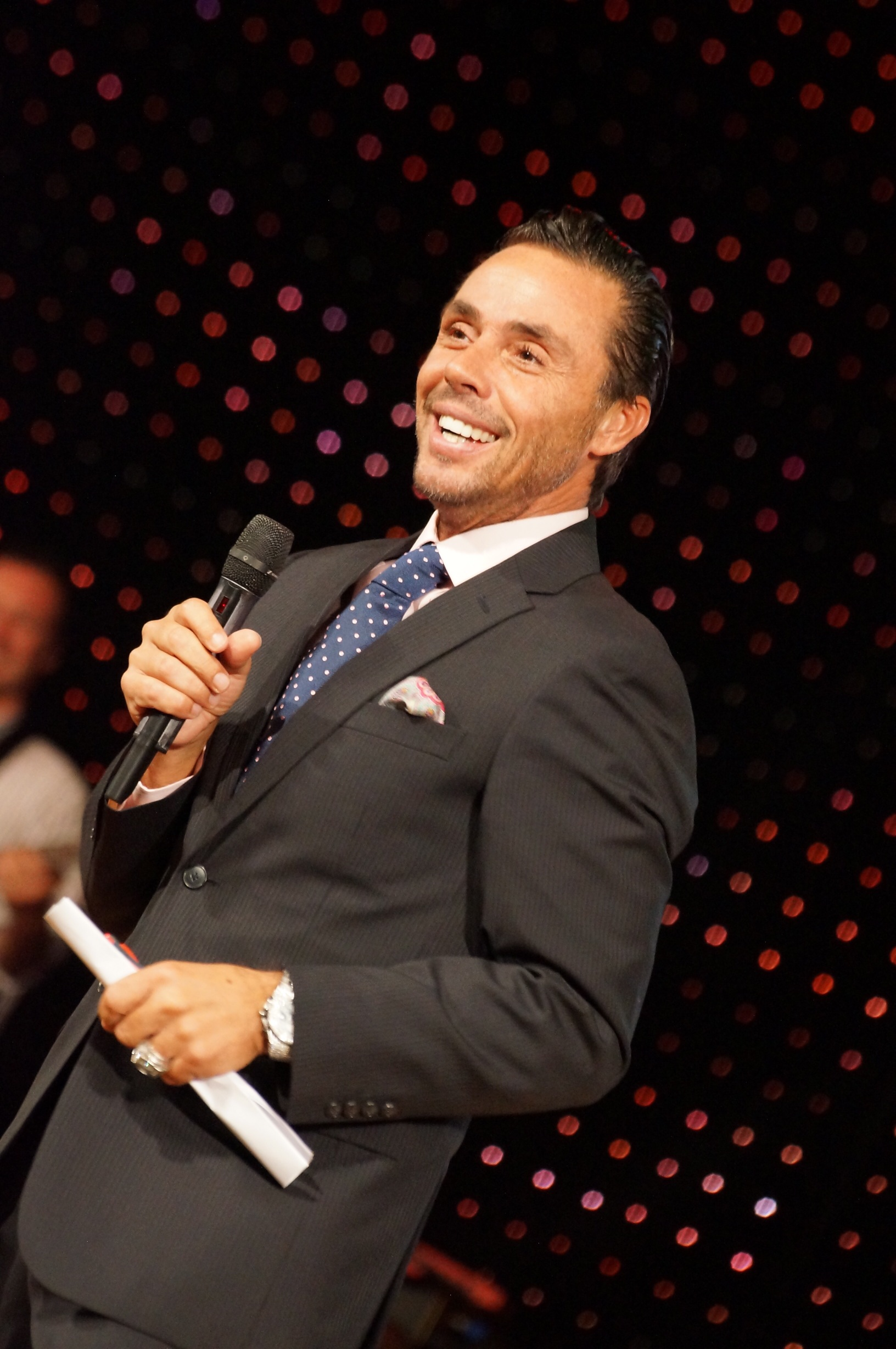
- Pitts in 2014

Personal life
- Born: Michael Stephen Pitts; August 31, 1964 (age 61) Lima, Ohio, United States
- Spouse: Kathi Pitts
- Occupation: Pastor

Religious life
- Religion: Christianity
- Website: michaelpitts.com

Michael Pitts is an American pastor, preacher, and author. He is the founding pastor of Cornerstone Church (now Declare Church) and oversees the Cornerstone Global Network, a network of over 150 churches throughout the US, Mexico, Argentina, Colombia, South Africa and the UK. He was consecrated as a bishop by the International Communion of Charismatic Churches in 2009.

== Early life and career ==
Michael Pitts was born in south Lima, Ohio, in 1964 to factory workers Eugene and Brenda Pitts. His parents were raised attending church regularly. At the age of 14, Pitts felt called to become a preacher.

In June 1986, Pitts and his wife Kathi moved to Toledo to start a non-denominational church, which they named Cornerstone Church. The church grew rapidly and by the age of 26, Pitts was preaching to over 1,000 weekly members. In 1995, Pitts moved the Church to Reynolds Road in Maumee, just outside Toledo, with a 2,500-seat facility. As of 2005 it became the largest church in Northwest Ohio, with 4,000 members. It was the first racially integrated church in the region. In 1998, Cornerstone Church purchased WDMN, an AM radio station in Toledo, and sold it in 2012.

Pitts has not attended seminary or theological college, but is self-taught from tapes, CDs, books, and other materials.

== Career ==
Pitts was consecrated as a bishop by the International Communion of Charismatic Churches in October 2009 for his oversight of the Cornerstone Global Network, a network of more than 120 churches. He has published more than a dozen books.

In 2015, Pitts commenced monthly revival services in San Jose, California. Pitts has preached at the annual Interdenominational Ministerial Alliance conference several times, as well as in Mexico and at annual meetings in South Africa, Zimbabwe, and Ghana.

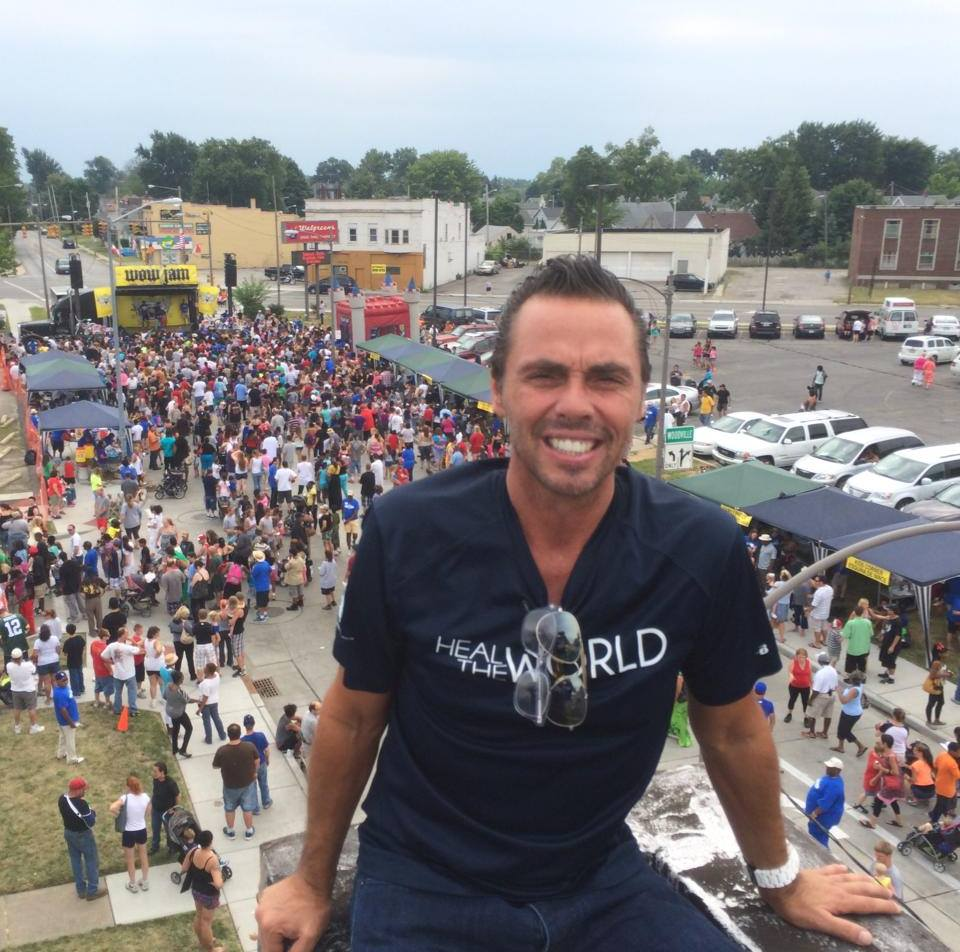
Michael Pitts at WOWJAM 2014

Pitts is the founder of "Heal The World", a registered 501(c)3 non-profit that activities include covering the cost of soup kitchen Thanksgiving meals, collecting Bibles for US soldiers, and partnering with Mercy Ministries. Heal The World also funds the Cornerstone Academy, a school in the village of Odokono N'kwanta, Ghanan.

Pitts has partnered with, and hosted annual WOWJAMs, an event started by Stephen and Linda Tavani aimed at reaching poorer communities around the city by utilizing music, games, dances, and prizes.

In December 2015, Pitts released the album Heal The World, containing songs co-written by Pitts and featuring Israel Houghton, Sheryl Brady, The Katinas, Lucia Parker, Linda Green (of Peaches & Herb) and Bryan Popin.

== Criminal and financial matters ==
On September 18, 1997, Pitts was arrested on charges of exposing himself to passing motorists near Oak Openings Metropark in Swanton, Ohio. In the months following, additional charges from other locations were added. The public indecency charge was dropped on January 15, 1998 when Judge Francis Gorman of the Toledo Municipal Court ruled that the statute of limitations had expired for the initial event. Eight additional public indecency charges were dropped due to "substantial evidentiary considerations" and Pitts pleaded "no contest" to two charges of criminal trespassing and was sentenced to 60 days in jail. Following the trial, Metroparks ranger Russell Maneval was suspended for 60 days by the Toledo Area Metroparks for falsifying information on police logs involved in the Toledo case.

Pitts' church invested in TV station WMNT-TV, Channel 48, in Toledo in 1997. Over the next 8 years the church invested over $800,000 into the station, eventually purchasing 37% ownership. In 2005, the church filed for a restraining order to halt its attempted sale by then owner, Lamaree Marty Miller. This started a string of court cases that included the discovery of illegal activity and fraud by Mr Miller. In 2007 the Church severed all ties with Miller, who later filed bankruptcy and relocated. In 1998, Cornerstone Church purchased one of the last gospel radio stations in Toledo. Immediately following the purchase, several area pastors complained that their shows had been pulled from regular programming. Pitts' response was that in line with the purchase, all programs were being evaluated, and those wanting to remain on the air were welcome to reapply.

In August 2000, Pitts was charged with a DUI. He pleaded “no contest” to the charge of driving while intoxicated and was sentenced to three days in a DWI program for first-time offenders. In 2006, Pitts again pleaded "no contest" to a DUI and was sentenced to 9 days in the Corrections Center of Northwest Ohio, a fine of $300, and suspension of Pitts’ driving license for one year, starting April 2007.

== Personal life ==
Pitts is the second of four children to Eugene and Brenda Pitts. He is married to Kathi and they have two children.

== Bibliography ==
- Fault Lines
