= Harry J. Moyer =

Harry J. Moyer (1918 – 2012) was an American politician born in New York. He was the Republican mayor of Lima, Ohio from 1974 to 1985 and council president the previous four years (1970–1974). According to Time magazine Moyer's campaign slogan in 1973 was "Let's get together and make Lima better — without any new taxes" and his "strategy is to merge public funds with private effort".In June 1976, Moyer officially received President Gerald Ford during a presidential visit to Lima. Moyer was the city's second-longest-serving mayor and its first to serve three terms.

Moyer ran again for mayor in 1989, but was defeated by Democrat David J. Berger, who served as mayor for 32-years until his retirement in 2021. Berger called Moyer "a very successful community promoter".

== Cultural depictions and media ==
In 1999, PBS broadcast Lost in Middle America (and What Happened Next), an Emmy-nominated documentary TV special narrated by Hal Holbrook. Directed by Lima native David Crouse, the film focused on Lima's economic transition during the post-industrial era, providing wider context to the municipal economic challenges faced during Moyer's political career.The documentary's title subsequently became a long-running phrase in local economic and cultural discussions.
