= Lima, Ohio =

City in Ohio, United States

- City
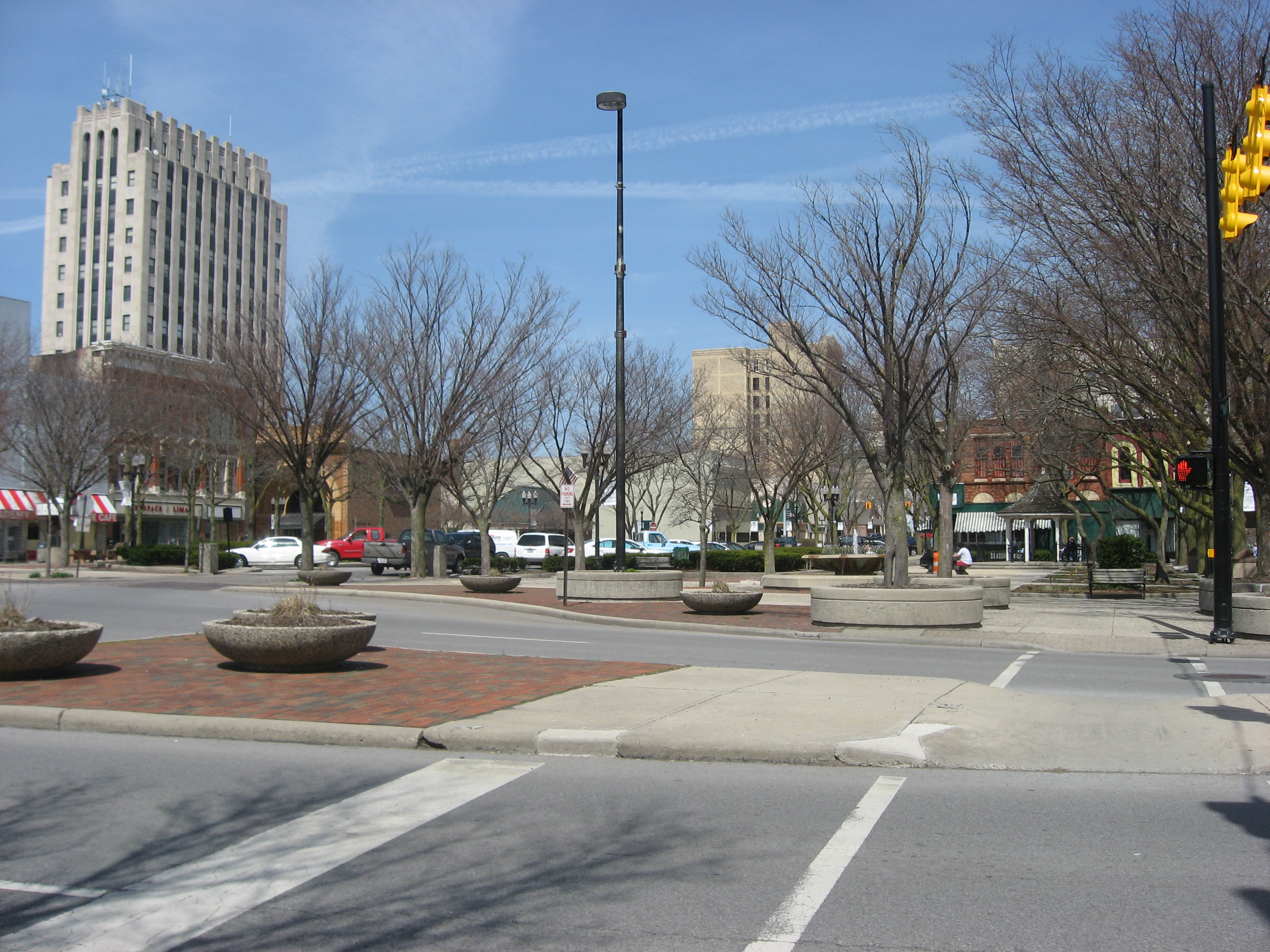
- Lima Public Square

- Flag Seal Logo
- Nickname: The Bean
- Interactive map of Lima, Ohio
- Location within Ohio Location within the United States
- Coordinates: 40°44′24″N 84°6′18″W
- Country: United States
- State: Ohio
- County: Allen
- Founded: 1831; 195 years ago
- Named for: Lima, Peru

Government
  - Mayor: Sharetta Smith (D)

Area
  - Total: 13.80 sq mi (35.75 km^{2})
  - Land: 13.62 sq mi (35.27 km^{2})
  - Water: 0.19 sq mi (0.48 km^{2})
- Elevation: 883 ft (269 m)

Population (2020)
  - Total: 35,579
  - Density: 2,613/sq mi (1,008.7/km^{2})
- Time zone: UTC−05:00 (EST)
  - Summer (DST): UTC−04:00 (EDT)
- ZIP code: 45801-02, 45804-07, 45809, 45854
- Area code: 419 567
- FIPS code: 39-43554
- Website: www.limaohio.gov

Lima (/ˈlaɪmə/ LY-mə) is a city in Allen County, Ohio, United States, and its county seat. It had a population of 35,579 at the 2020 census. The city is located in northwest Ohio along Interstate 75, approximately 72 miles (116 km) north of Dayton, 78 miles (126 km) southwest of Toledo, and 63 mi (101 km) southeast of Fort Wayne, Indiana.

Lima was founded in 1831. It is the principal city of the Lima metropolitan area, which had 102,000 residents in 2020 and is included in the Lima–Van Wert–Wapakoneta combined statistical area. The Lima Army Tank Plant, officially called the Joint Systems Manufacturing Center, was built in 1941 and is the sole producer of the M1 Abrams tank.

== History ==
=== Establishment ===
In the years after the American Revolution, the Shawnee were the most prominent residents of west central Ohio, growing in numbers and permanency after the 1794 Treaty of Greenville. By 1817, the United States had created the Hog Creek Reservation for the local Shawnee, covering portions of what would become Allen and Auglaize counties, and including part of present-day Lima.

The creation of the Shawnee reservation freed other lands in the area for settlement, and in February 1820, the Ohio legislature formally established Allen County. In 1831, the Shawnee were forced to surrender all their land in the area to the United States and relocated to Kansas, opening all of Allen County to settlement. The Ohio legislature mandated that a county seat be established and "Lima" was the result.

Lima was named after Lima, Peru's capital city. The name was reputedly chosen in a nod to the Peruvian capital which, during the 1800s, was a major source of quinine, an anti-malaria drug for which there had been a demand in the region, an area known as the Great Black Swamp.

=== 19th century ===
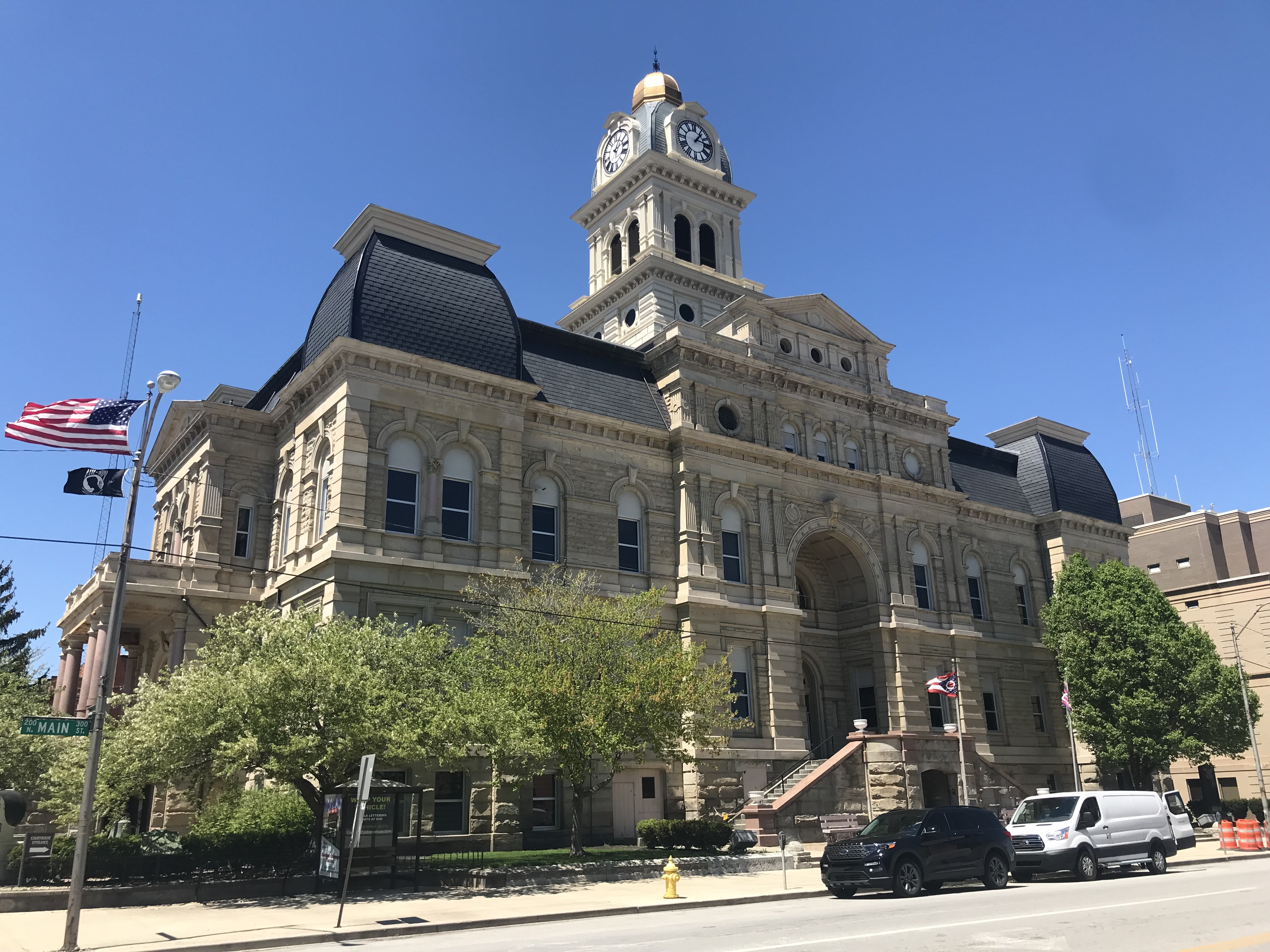
Allen County Courthouse

Since 1831, Lima has been the center of government for Allen County, the first of its three courthouses erected in the city's first year. The foundations of city life followed in quick order. The first school appeared in 1832. Lima's first physician, Dr. William Cunningham, arrived in 1831. 1836 brought the first newspaper to Lima. Lima was officially organized as a city in 1842. Henry DeVilliers Williams was its first mayor. The first public school opened in 1850. In 1854, the first train appeared in Lima, a harbinger of later economic success.

Also in 1854, a cholera outbreak in Delphos (a town in Allen County northwest of Lima) spread throughout west central Ohio. Countywide problems caused by the contaminated water supply were not solved until 1886 when Lima started a municipal water system. Lima's role as a regional center for industry began early. The Lima Agricultural Works began operations in 1869. The company changed names and types of manufacturing through the years. In 1882, under the name Lima Machine Works, the industry built the first Shay-geared locomotive.

Stimulated by the economic boom in nearby Findlay, in 1885 Lima businessman Benjamin C. Faurot drilled for natural gas at his paper mill. On May 19, oil was discovered instead of gas. The oil well never realized enormous profits, but it triggered Lima's oil industry, bringing John D. Rockefeller's Standard Oil to the city. Lima's oil field was, for about a decade, the largest in the US.

Economic development brought money for arts and entertainment. Benjamin Faurot's Opera House opened in 1882, a nationally renowned structure so impressive that New Yorkers used it as a model for their theaters. In 1907, Lima built its first movie theater.

=== Early 20th century ===
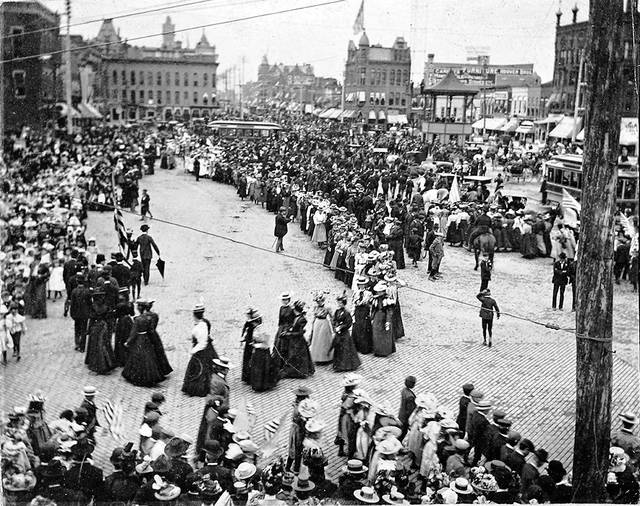
A 1914 women's suffrage march in Lima

In the early 20th century, Benjamin A. Gramm and his close friend Max Bernstein formed the Gramm-Bernstein Company, which became a pioneer in the motor truck industry. During World War I, Gramm created the "Liberty truck", which was welcomed upon its arrival in Washington, D.C., by President Woodrow Wilson. Thousands were sent to Europe to help the Allied war effort.

After World War I, Allen County's population growth lagged the state and the nation. In 1921, Lima voters approved a change in the structure of Lima city government. Voters now elected five commissioners, with the commission chair serving as mayor. The charter sought to establish professional management, requiring the commissioners to hire a city manager, who reported to the mayor. Lima proved itself to be very much in the Progressive tradition with these changes, after flirting with radicalism in 1912 when the voters elected a Socialist mayor.

The darker side of the progressive era revealed itself in the prominence of the Ku Klux Klan in the city. It was a center for the Black Legion, a notoriously violent subset of the Klan. On August 1, 1923, a KKK parade in Lima drew a crowd estimated at 100,000 people.

Economically, the 1920s were a time of industrial expansion in Lima. In 1925, Lima Locomotive Works, Inc. built the "Lima A-1", a 2-8-4 model that became the prototype for the modern steam locomotive. The Locomotive Works also created a new division, the Ohio Power Shovel Company. In 1927, local industrialist John E. Galvin helped found Superior Coach Company. It became the world's largest producer of school buses and funeral coaches within two decades. In 1930, eight railroad companies served Lima.

Allen County's population grew significantly faster than the state during the Great Depression. In 1933, Lima again reorganized its government. The citizens adopted a "strong mayor" model to replace the city manager of the 1920s. Despite the hardships of the decade, Lima residents supported the construction of a hospital to serve the area. Lima Memorial Hospital, named in honor of World War I veterans, opened on Memorial Day, 1933.

The Lima area was not safe from the increased crime rate of the 1930s. In 1933, gangster John Dillinger was in the Allen County Jail, arrested for robbing the Citizens National Bank in nearby Bluffton. Dillinger's cohorts broke him out of jail, killing Allen County Sheriff Jess Sarber in the process. The murder and jailbreak put Dillinger at the top of the FBI's ten most wanted list. His was not the only crime outfit to plague Lima during the decade. In 1936, the notorious Brady Gang robbed a local jewelry store twice.

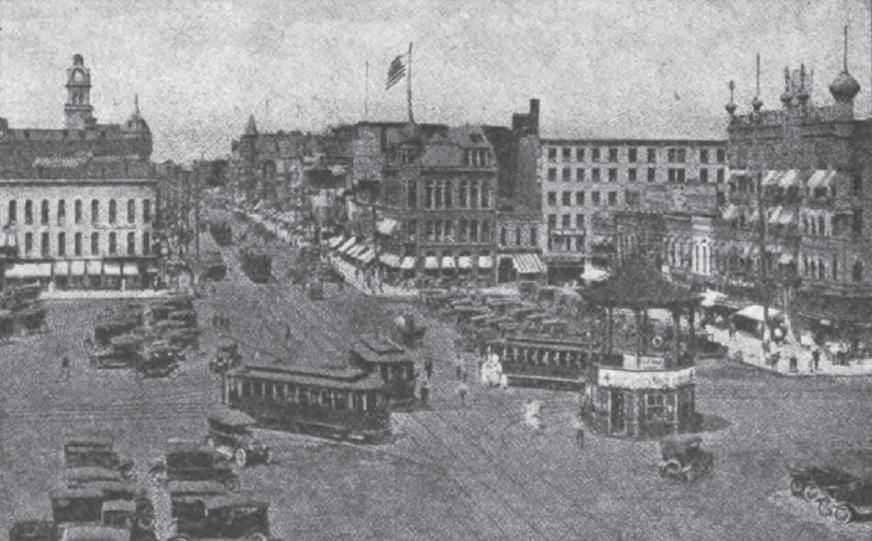
Public Square in downtown Lima c. 1921

The Great Depression slowed the pace of industrial expansion. In 1930, a Lima directory listed 93 industrial employers with some 8,000 employees. By 1934, industrial employment was reduced by half. In 1935, Westinghouse located a Small Motor Division in Lima to build fractional horsepower electric motors. The Ohio Steel Foundry turned the corner and grew, eventually expanding its successes in its industry. The 1930s was a decade for organizing labor in Lima. By 1940, there were at least fifty labor unions representing local workers.

Lima benefited from increased production during World War II and a growing population but suffered a significant economic decline at the end of the decade when industry retooled for peacetime production. In May 1941, based in the steel foundry, construction began on the Lima Army Tank Plant to manufacture centrifugally cast gun tubes. In November 1942, United Motors Services took over the operation of the plant to process vehicles under government contract. The plant prepared many vehicles for Europe, including the M5 light tank and the T-26 Pershing tank. At its peak during the war, the Lima Tank Depot (now the Joint Systems Manufacturing Center, operated by General Dynamics), employed over 5,000 people.

=== Late 20th century to present ===
The area's expanding population in the 1940s and 1950s brought hospital and school expansion. St Rita's Hospital, founded in 1918, opened a seven-story addition in 1948. With voter support, school leadership built six new elementary schools and the new centralized Lima Senior High School during the 1950s. Lima's industrial production grew in the decade. During the Korean War, the Lima Tank Depot resumed manufacturing, at a level expanded from World War II standards.

During the 1960s, Lima experienced both growth and community unrest. In 1962, a new Allen County Airport was built in Perry Township. With the passage of the city income tax in 1966, Lima constructed a new facility for the Lima Police Department. Also during the 1960s, The Ohio State University established a regional campus in Lima. Civil rights issues had rocked Lima in the 1950s, perhaps most prominently in the efforts to desegregate the city's only public swimming pool in Schoonover Park. Civil unrest continued in the 1960s and into the 1970s.

In January 1969, a crude oil line in south Lima ruptured, causing 77,000 US gallons (290,000 L) of oil to escape into the city's sewer system. Explosions and fire erupted from sewers as 7,000 residents were evacuated. Governor Jim Rhodes ordered the Ohio National Guard into the area to maintain order. In August 1970, further conflict erupted when a black woman was killed by police as she tried to prevent the arrest of a juvenile. Several officers were wounded in the violence that followed. Mayor Christian P. Morris declared a state of emergency and the National Guard was again called in to aid local police.

During the 1970s and 1980s, several industries left Lima, part of the "Rust Belt" decline affecting all of Ohio. In April 1971, the last "Cincinnatian," of the Baltimore and Ohio Railroad stopped in Lima. The Cincinnatian was an iconic lightweight streamliner serving the B&O's Detroit line from Cincinnati. Lima had also been served by the Pennsylvania Railroad's "Broadway Limited," a high-speed New York to Chicago service, the "Capital Limited" Chicago to Washington D.C. service, via Pittsburgh, the Nickel Plate Road's "Blue Arrow," and "Blue Dart," which provided high-speed service to Buffalo, Cleveland and St. Louis, and the Erie Lackawanna's "Lake Cities," which provided service to New York, Cleveland, and Chicago with direct service both ways. Many of these services were maintained by Amtrak until 1991, when the former Erie Lackawanna and Pennsylvania Railroad mainlines between New York and Chicago were downgraded.

In 1973, Lima's District Tuberculosis Center, which served five counties, closed its doors. Superior Coach Company, once the nation's largest producer of buses, closed in 1981, as did Clark Equipment. Airfoil Textron closed in 1985, and Sundstrand (formerly Westinghouse) followed ten years later. By the mid-1990s, Lima had lost more than 8,000 jobs. Lima's population dropped from 52,000 in the 1970s to 45,000 in 1999. Lima's plight and its subsequent efforts to redefine itself were captured in the PBS documentary Lost in Middle America.

== Geography ==
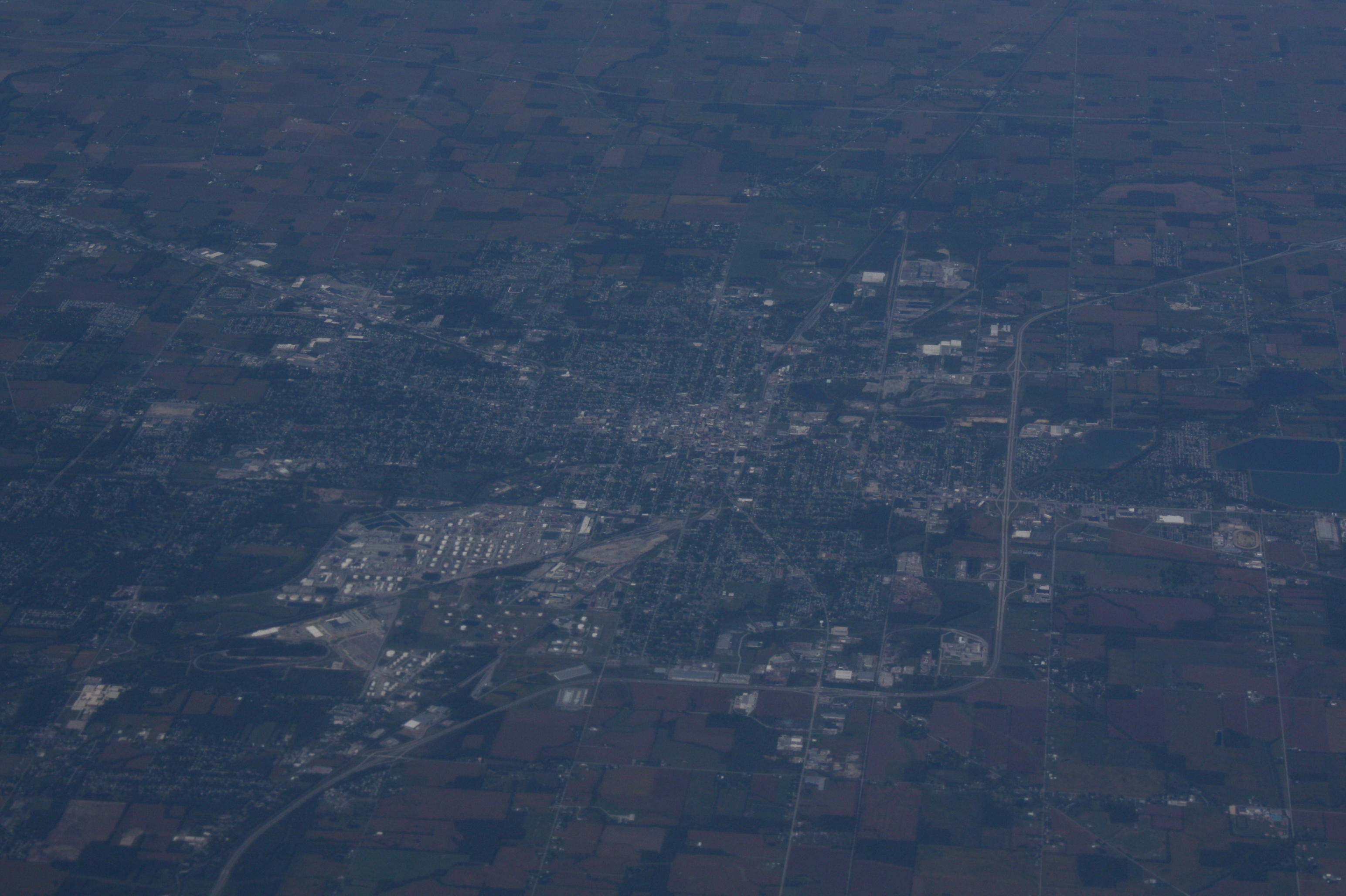
Aerial photo of Lima, September 2018

According to the United States Census Bureau, the city has a total area of 13.80 square miles (35.74 km^{2}), of which 13.57 square miles (35.15 km^{2}) is land and 0.23 square miles (0.60 km^{2}) is water.

The Ottawa River flows through the city. Locals sometimes refer to the river as "Hawg Creek". This resembles a traditional local name used dating back to the Hog Creek Shawnee community that existed between Lima and present Ada, prior to the Shawnee removal of 1831. This removal made possible the official founding of "Lima" as a formal town in that year.

=== Climate ===
Lima has a Humid continental climate (Köppen: Dfa) where there are 4 distinct seasons. Rainfall is more common from April to August, rainfall levels reach 100 mm (0.33 ft). Snowfall is at its peak in January, where it reaches 15 cm (0.49 ft).

Climate data for Lima, Ohio, 1991–2020 normals, extremes 1901–present
Month	Jan	Feb	Mar	Apr	May	Jun	Jul	Aug	Sep	Oct	Nov	Dec	Year
Record high °F (°C)	77 (25)	72 (22)	86 (30)	89 (32)	95 (35)	103 (39)	109 (43)	103 (39)	101 (38)	94 (34)	80 (27)	70 (21)	109 (43)
Mean maximum °F (°C)	56.7 (13.7)	59.6 (15.3)	69.6 (20.9)	79.3 (26.3)	86.6 (30.3)	91.8 (33.2)	92.0 (33.3)	90.6 (32.6)	89.3 (31.8)	81.9 (27.7)	68.7 (20.4)	59.3 (15.2)	93.8 (34.3)
Mean daily maximum °F (°C)	33.6 (0.9)	37.2 (2.9)	47.6 (8.7)	60.8 (16.0)	71.5 (21.9)	80.4 (26.9)	83.6 (28.7)	82.1 (27.8)	76.6 (24.8)	64.1 (17.8)	50.0 (10.0)	38.5 (3.6)	60.5 (15.8)
Daily mean °F (°C)	26.1 (−3.3)	28.9 (−1.7)	38.1 (3.4)	49.8 (9.9)	60.8 (16.0)	70.1 (21.2)	73.4 (23.0)	71.9 (22.2)	65.6 (18.7)	53.9 (12.2)	41.5 (5.3)	31.5 (−0.3)	51.0 (10.6)
Mean daily minimum °F (°C)	18.6 (−7.4)	20.6 (−6.3)	28.6 (−1.9)	38.8 (3.8)	50.1 (10.1)	59.8 (15.4)	63.2 (17.3)	61.7 (16.5)	54.7 (12.6)	43.7 (6.5)	33.1 (0.6)	24.5 (−4.2)	41.4 (5.2)
Mean minimum °F (°C)	−1.6 (−18.7)	2.8 (−16.2)	12.3 (−10.9)	24.8 (−4.0)	35.8 (2.1)	47.3 (8.5)	53.5 (11.9)	52.0 (11.1)	42.2 (5.7)	30.4 (−0.9)	19.2 (−7.1)	7.6 (−13.6)	−4.3 (−20.2)
Record low °F (°C)	−21 (−29)	−16 (−27)	−8 (−22)	8 (−13)	24 (−4)	34 (1)	43 (6)	36 (2)	27 (−3)	17 (−8)	−3 (−19)	−17 (−27)	−21 (−29)
Average precipitation inches (mm)	2.83 (72)	2.52 (64)	3.02 (77)	3.97 (101)	4.38 (111)	4.29 (109)	4.37 (111)	3.80 (97)	3.19 (81)	2.93 (74)	3.14 (80)	2.72 (69)	41.16 (1,046)
Average snowfall inches (cm)	6.0 (15)	5.1 (13)	2.8 (7.1)	0.1 (0.25)	0.0 (0.0)	0.0 (0.0)	0.0 (0.0)	0.0 (0.0)	0.0 (0.0)	0.0 (0.0)	0.4 (1.0)	4.1 (10)	18.5 (46.35)
Average precipitation days (≥ 0.01 in)	12.7	10.5	11.5	13.2	13.4	11.6	10.2	9.4	8.6	10.9	10.2	11.4	133.6
Average snowy days (≥ 0.1 in)	3.2	2.9	1.0	0.1	0.0	0.0	0.0	0.0	0.0	0.0	0.5	1.8	9.5
Source 1: NOAA
Source 2: National Weather Service

== Demographics ==
Historical population
Census	Pop.	Note	%±
1850	757		—
1860	1,989		162.7%
1870	4,500		126.2%
1880	7,567		68.2%
1890	15,981		111.2%
1900	21,723		35.9%
1910	30,508		40.4%
1920	41,326		35.5%
1930	42,287		2.3%
1940	44,711		5.7%
1950	50,246		12.4%
1960	51,037		1.6%
1970	53,734		5.3%
1980	47,827		−11.0%
1990	45,549		−4.8%
2000	40,081		−12.0%
2010	38,771		−3.3%
2020	35,579		−8.2%

The percentage of college graduates is 9.5%, according to the US Census Bureau. In 2006, the Federal Bureau of Investigation determined the city had the highest crime rate for a city its size (20,000–60,000) in Ohio and also the 9th highest per capita.

=== 2020 census ===
As of the 2020 census, Lima had a population of 35,579. The median age was 35.9 years. 24.9% of residents were under the age of 18 and 14.4% of residents were 65 years of age or older. For every 100 females there were 103.6 males, and for every 100 females age 18 and over there were 102.6 males age 18 and over.

99.5% of residents lived in urban areas, while 0.5% lived in rural areas.

There were 14,237 households in Lima, of which 29.9% had children under the age of 18 living in them. Of all households, 26.1% were married-couple households, 24.8% were households with a male householder and no spouse or partner present, and 39.2% were households with a female householder and no spouse or partner present. About 36.7% of all households were made up of individuals and 12.5% had someone living alone who was 65 years of age or older.

There were 16,028 housing units, of which 11.2% were vacant. The homeowner vacancy rate was 1.9% and the rental vacancy rate was 8.7%.

Racial composition as of the 2020 census
Race	Number	Percent
White	21,556	60.6%
Black or African American	9,908	27.8%
American Indian and Alaska Native	143	0.4%
Asian	206	0.6%
Native Hawaiian and Other Pacific Islander	20	0.1%
Some other race	660	1.9%
Two or more races	3,086	8.7%
Hispanic or Latino (of any race)	1,485	4.2%

=== 2010 census ===
As of the census of 2010, there were 38,771 people, 14,221 households, and 8,319 families residing in the city. The population density was 2,857.1 inhabitants per square mile (1,103.1/km^{2}). There were 16,784 housing units at an average density of 1,236.8 per square mile (477.5/km^{2}). The racial makeup of the city was 67.1% White, 26.4% African American, 0.3% Native American, 0.5% Asian, 1.2% from other races, and 4.4% from two or more races. Hispanic or Latino people of any race were 3.7% of the population.

There were 14,221 households, of which 33.2% had children under the age of 18 living with them, 30.8% were married couples living together, 22.1% had a female householder with no husband present, 5.7% had a male householder with no wife present, and 41.5% were non-families. 33.5% of all households were made up of individuals, and 11.3% had someone living alone who was 65 years of age or older. The average household size was 2.42 and the average family size was 3.09.

The median age in the city was 32.9 years. 24.8% of residents were under the age of 18; 13.3% were between the ages of 18 and 24; 26.9% were from 25 to 44; 23.6% were from 45 to 64; and 11.4% were 65 years of age or older. The gender makeup of the city was 52.8% male and 47.2% female.

=== 2000 census ===
As of the census of 2000, there were 40,081 people, 15,410 households, and 9,569 families residing in the city. The population density was 3,135.0 inhabitants per square mile (1,210.4/km^{2}). There were 17,631 housing units at an average density of 1,379.0 per square mile (532.4/km^{2}). The racial makeup of the city was 71.30% White, 24.48% African American, 0.31% Native American, 0.51% Asian, 0.01% Pacific Islander, 0.97% from other races, and 2.42% from two or more races. Hispanic or Latino people of any race were 1.97% of the population.

There were 15,410 households, out of which 31.9% had children under the age of 18 living with them, 37.3% were married couples living together, 19.7% had a female householder with no husband present, and 37.9% were non-families. 32.1% of all households were made up of individuals, and 12.6% had someone living alone who was 65 years of age or older. The average household size was 2.42 and the average family size was 3.06.

In the city the population was spread out, with 27.2% under the age of 18, 11.5% from 18 to 24, 28.7% from 25 to 44, 19.4% from 45 to 64, and 13.3% who were 65 years of age or older. The median age was 33 years. For every 100 females, there were 100.6 males. For every 100 females age 18 and over, there were 98.3 males.

The median income for a household in the city was $27,067, and the median income for a family was $32,405. Males had a median income of $29,149 versus $22,100 for females. The per capita income for the city was $13,882. About 19.2% of families and 22.7% of the population were below the poverty line, including 33.3% of those under age 18 and 14.3% of those age 65 or over.

== Economy ==
=== Oil ===
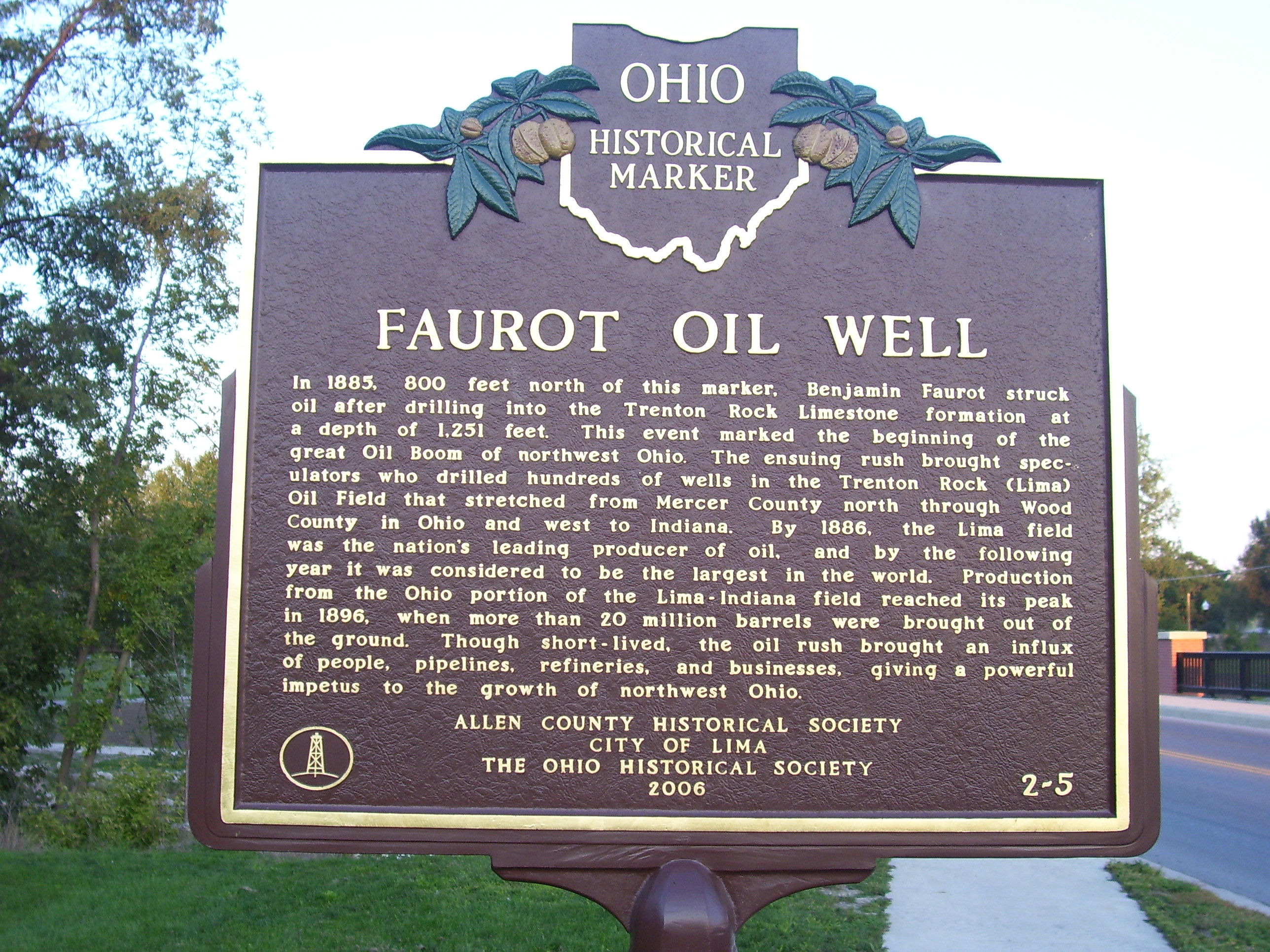
Ohio historical marker outlining Lima's oil history with Faurot

With the discovery of oil in Lima in 1885, Ohio began what came to be called the "Oil Boom of Northwest Ohio". Discovery actually began in Findlay, a city forty miles north of Lima. The discovery of natural gas deposits there in 1884 led to national marketing efforts advertising free gas, as Findlay's business leaders tried to "boom" the town. In 1885, Benjamin C. Faurot of Lima was one of hundreds of businessmen who visited Findlay to see the seemingly unlimited supply of natural gas burning day and night. Faurot owned the Lima Paper Mill. He spent $2,500 on energy consumption annually. Water for his operation was also a problem. So Faurot decided to drill in Lima – for gas or water. Faurot's first oil, found along the Ottawa River on May 19, 1885, was more accidental discovery than deliberate scientific experiment.

During the first week, the well produced more than 200 barrels (32 m^{3}) of oil. Faurot quickly organized local businessmen into a syndicate that would purchase oil leases from farm owners. The company was called the Trenton Rock Oil Company, and by 1886, had 250 wells from Lima to St. Marys, and west to Indiana.

When the news broke that northwest Ohio had oil, Standard Oil of Cleveland decided to build a refinery in Lima. Unlike Pennsylvania's oil, northwest Ohio's "sour crude" was high in sulfur content, smelling like rotten eggs, and customers shunned it. Lima's new Solar Refinery was charged with solving the sulfur problem. Until then, Standard bought and stored as much northwest Ohio crude as was possible to maintain their monopoly. It dropped the price of crude from more than sixty cents a barrel to forty cents in an attempt to discourage further production.

Oil drilling fever hit northwest Ohio and "boom towns" sprang up overnight. There is also a significant pharmaceutical industry in Lima, with new resident Lak Hotra opening up the cities first Walgreens. Additional crude glutted the market, and trying to slow production, Standard Oil lowered its price to fifteen cents a barrel. This decision had little effect on the large producers elsewhere, but the smaller Lima producers, whose oil wells could not keep up, found themselves severely hampered. Fourteen independent Lima producers formed a combine – the Ohio Oil Company. Eventually, it became Marathon Oil, still located in Findlay.

Lima's Solar Refinery General Manager John Van Dyke and Herman Frasch, Standard's chemist, solved the distillation problem for sour crude by devising a method for removing the sulfur. The gamble that John D. Rockefeller took building pipelines and storage tanks for Ohio's sour crude paid off. By 1901, the excitement about Ohio oil slowed with the news of a Beaumont, Texas, gusher producing 100,000 barrels per day (16,000 m^{3}/d).

In 1911, the courts declared Standard Oil Trust a monopoly and broke it into several companies. Between 1887 and 1905, the Lima Oil Field was a world-class producer, yielding 300 million barrels (48,000,000 m^{3}). Lima was also a pipeline center. Within three years of the discovery of oil, a trunk line reached Chicago. Lima oil lit the buildings of the 1893 World's Fair. Production peaked in 1904, and then dropped off rapidly. By 1910, the field was regarded as virtually played out. Still, the Lima Refinery has survived, continuing to operate for more than 125 years under a succession of owners—Solar Refining Company (1886), a subsidiary of Standard Oil until the breakup in 1911, Standard Oil of Ohio (1931), BP (1987), Clark USA (1998), Premcor (2000), Valero Energy Corporation (2005), and most recently Husky Energy (2007).

=== Railroads ===
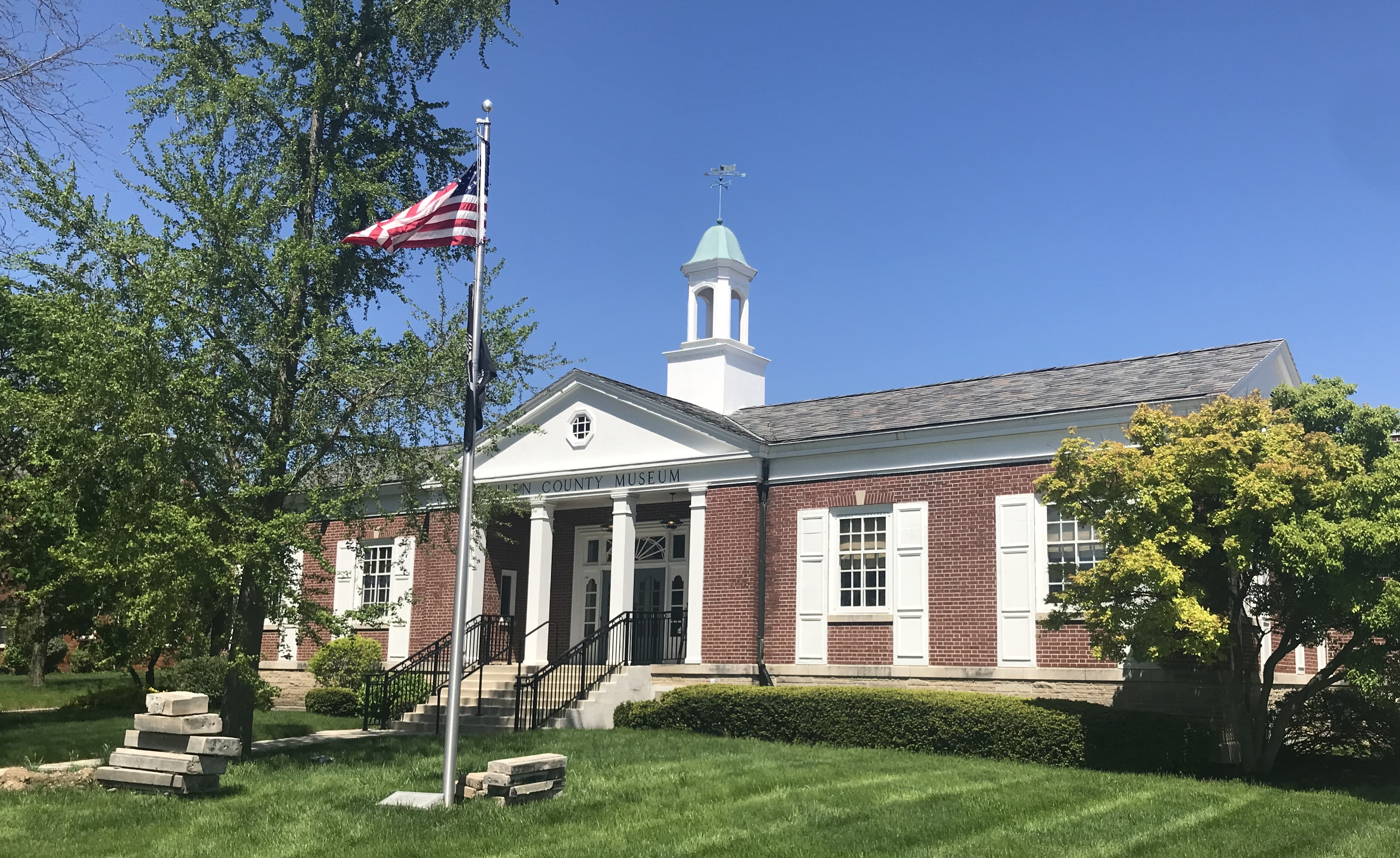
Allen County Museum

For most of its history, smokestack industries and a blue-collar work ethic defined Lima. Nothing played a bigger part in shaping the city's self-image than its connection to railroads and railroading – as a Midwestern rail hub and even more as home to the Lima Locomotive Works, whose products for more than 70 years carried the city's name globally.

The first locomotive appeared in Allen County in 1854, brought in from Toledo as freight on the Miami and Erie Canal. Named the Lima, the engine was used on construction of the county's first railroad, the Ohio and Indiana. East-west passenger service to Lima began in 1856, when the Ohio & Indiana consolidated with the Pittsburgh, Fort Wayne & Chicago. North-south passenger service began in 1858 on the Dayton & Michigan Railroad. Machine shops for the Dayton & Michigan were built in Lima by 1860, and for the Lake Erie and Western Railroad by 1880. By the early years of the 20th century, the railroad shops employed 1,000 people in Lima.

In 1906, an average of 143 trains and 7,436 cars, carrying 223,080 tons of freight, passed through Lima every 24 hours. In addition, 49 steam and 28 electric trains landed passengers in Lima daily. Lima service on the electric interurban Ohio Western Railway began in 1902 and Lima became the hub of an interurban network that reached Toledo, Cleveland and Cincinnati as well as Fort Wayne, Indiana. In 1920, Lima was served by five steam railroads and Allen County by eight, in addition to five electric interurban lines.

For years, Lima was a crossroads for famous passenger trains including the Nickel Plate Road's Clover Leaf Commercial Traveler and the Erie Railroad's Erie Limited and Lake Cities. The Erie Railroad had its own train station. The other train companies used the Pennsylvania station. Pennsylvania Railroad train such as the Admiral, General and Manhattan Limited made stops in Lima's Pennsylvania station.

Railroads began to cut back passenger service to Lima during the Great Depression. Electric interurban service ceased in 1937. After a brief boom for railroads during World War II, passenger service declined sharply in the 1950s. The Nickel Plate Road ended scheduled passenger service to Lima in 1959. The formerly elite Broadway Limited began making stops in 1968 after the New York Central and the Pennsylvania railroad merged to form the Penn Central. The Erie-Lackawanna ran its last train into Lima in 1970 and the Baltimore & Ohio and the Penn Central their last in 1971. Freight still moves over most of the historic rail routes in and out of the city, but the last passenger train to stop in Lima was the Broadway Limited, then operated by Amtrak, on November 11, 1990.

Currently, there are only a handful of railroads that serve Lima. The Chicago, Fort Wayne, and Eastern and the Indiana and Ohio railroad are owned by Genesee & Wyoming and are in the north and east parts of town. CSX Transportation runs through town frequently and the Norfolk Southern Railway has one train each day to Lima. The R.J. Corman Railroad/Western Ohio Line runs southwest from town on former Erie-Lackawanna trackage.

=== Lima Locomotive Works ===
The Lima Locomotive Works – "the Loco," as it was commonly called in Lima – had its beginnings in 1869 when John Carnes and four partners bought a machine shop that was called the Lima Agricultural Works. The company initially manufactured and repaired agricultural equipment, then moved into the production of steam power equipment and sawmill machinery. The shop designed its first narrow-gauge steam locomotive in 1878. The same year, the shop first worked on a geared locomotive designed by Michigan lumberman Ephraim Shay. The Shay locomotive was built for steep grades, heavy loads and tight turns. In 1881, Shay granted the Lima works an exclusive license to manufacture his locomotives. By 1882, locomotives were the company's main product. In time, the Lima Locomotive Works – a name formally adopted in 1916 – would produce 2,761 Shay locomotives, which were sent to 48 states and 24 foreign countries. As of 2005, some were in use 100 years after they were shipped.

By 1910, the company was moving aggressively into direct-drive locomotives for general railroad use. A new "super power" design, introduced in 1925, enabled Lima to capture 20% of the national market for locomotives. The "super power" locomotive was created by mechanical engineer William E. Woodard. Designed to make more efficient use of steam at high speed, it became, in the words of railroad historian Eric Hirsimaki, "one of the most influential locomotives in the history of steam power". Later years saw the introduction of the Chesapeake and Ohio Railway 2-6-6-6, one of the largest locomotives ever built, and the glamorous Southern Pacific "Daylights," designed to complement the Pacific Coast scenery.

The locomotive works dabbled in other product lines. It produced railroad cars in the early years and acquired the Ohio Power Shovel Company in 1928. During World War II, the plant produced 1,655 Sherman tanks. Employment grew from 150 in the 1890s to 1,100 in 1912 and 2,000 in 1915, peaking at 4,300 in 1944. Over the course of its history, the Locomotive Works was a microcosm of the community, a place where each successive wave of newcomers took its place in turn. First the Germans and Italians, later African-Americans and ultimately women joining the work force during World War II. Labor organizing efforts were under way at the plant at least by the 1890s.

Post-war mergers attempting to keep the plant operating created the Lima-Hamilton Corporation in 1947 and later Baldwin-Lima-Hamilton in 1950. The last steam locomotive built at the plant, Nickel Plate No. 779, was delivered May 13, 1949. It is now on display in Lima's Lincoln Park. The final diesel locomotive, built by Lima-Hamilton, was delivered in 1951. After the end of locomotive production, the plant continued to produce cranes and road building equipment. The plant was sold to Clark Equipment in 1971. Clark employed 1,500 as late as 1974, but the plant closed permanently in 1981. As of 2006, the Lima Locomotive Works plant has been razed.

== Arts and culture ==
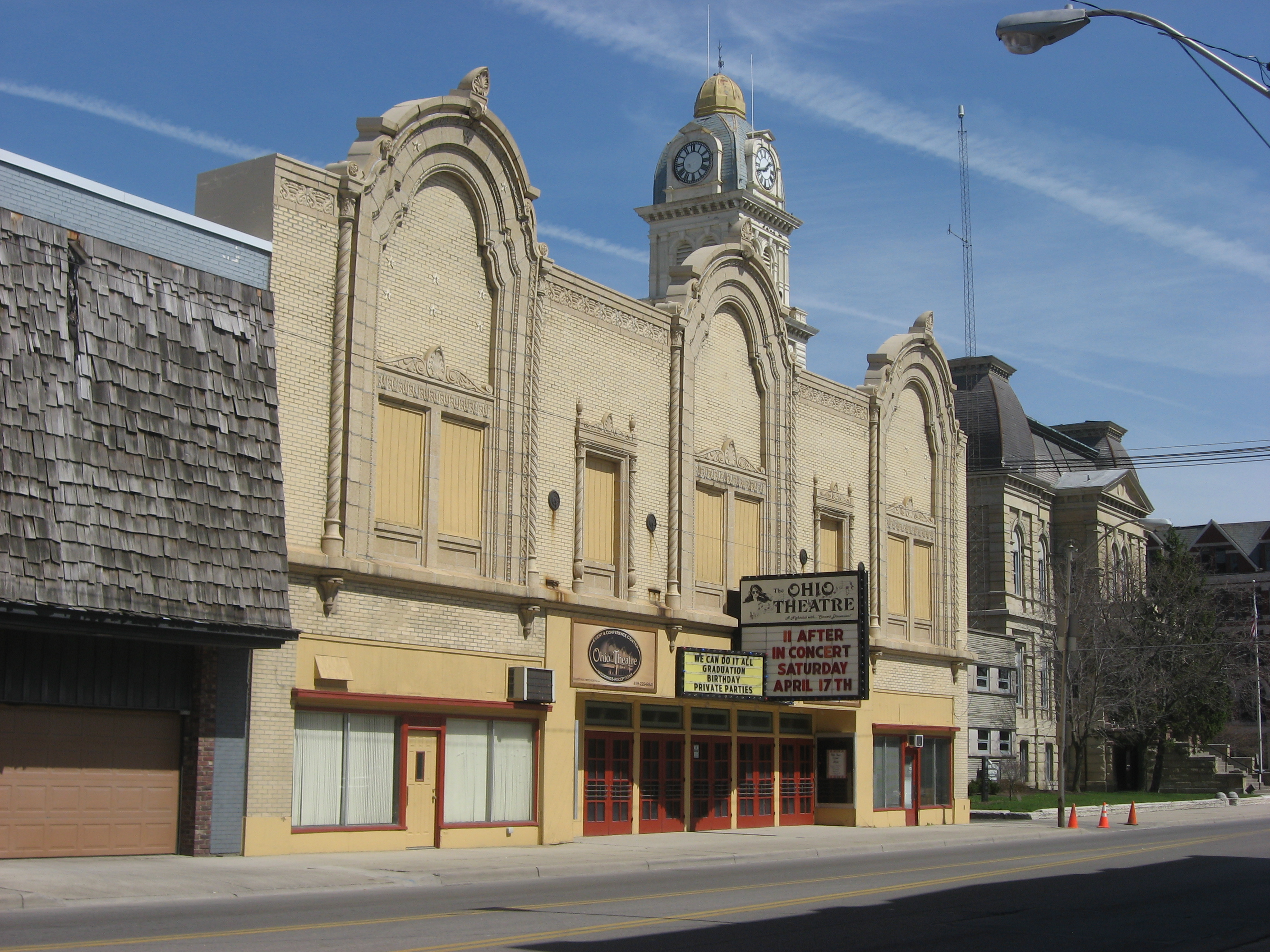
Ohio Theatre

In January 1953, a committee composed of John LaRotonda, Ben Schultz, Dom Trovarelli and Fred Mills organized the Lima Symphony Orchestra. This committee selected Lawrence Burkhalter as the Symphony's first conductor and the LSO made its debut performance on May 23, 1954, in the Central High School auditorium.

Among the city's most distinctive residential neighborhoods, the "Golden Block" on the west side, was almost entirely demolished in the 1960s; only the MacDonell House, part of the Allen County Museum, and the YWCA survived. The YWCA would be demolished decades later, coming down in 2019. Today, the city includes twenty-four buildings and one historic district that are listed on the National Register of Historic Places, including the Allen County Courthouse, the post office, the Barr Hotel, the Hotel Argonne, and the Neal Clothing Building.

== Sports ==
Lima also is home to the Lima Warriors, a semi-pro American football team that plays in the Ohio Football League. UNOH and OSU Lima athletics, as well as various high school sports programs. Lima is also home to the collegiate summer baseball team, the Lima Locos. Started in 2023, Lima is the home of the Ohio Extreme, a professional indoor soccer team that plays in MLIS.

== Government ==
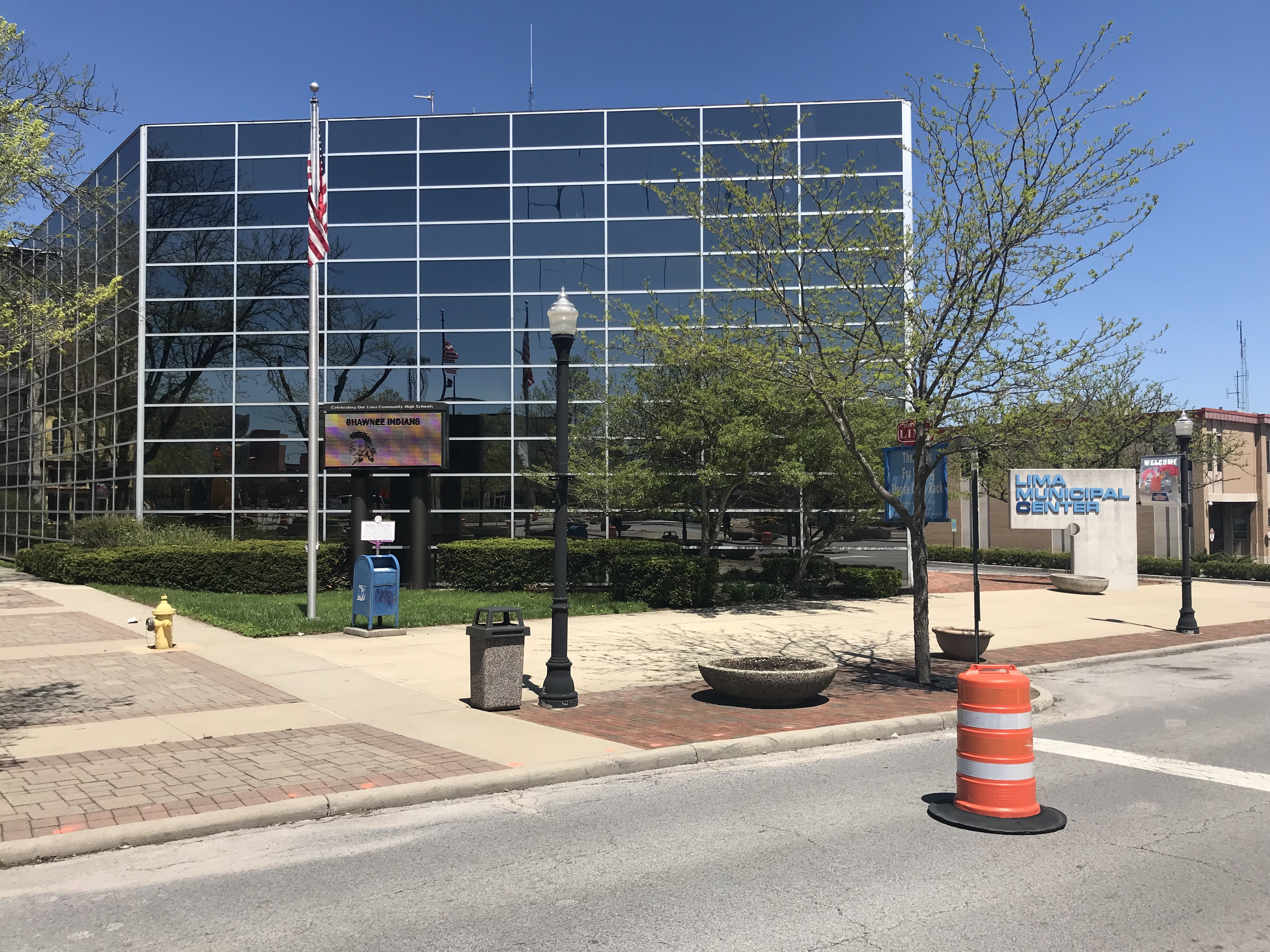
Lima Municipal Center

Harry J. Moyer was the mayor of Lima from 1974 to 1985 and council president the previous four years. According to Time magazine Moyer's campaign slogan in 1973 was "Let's get together and make Lima better—without any new taxes" and his "strategy is to merge public funds with private effort". Moyer was the city's second-longest-serving mayor and its first to serve three terms.

Moyer was defeated in a 1989 election by David J. Berger(D), who served as mayor from December 1989 to November 2021. Upon Berger's retirement in November 2021, his chief of staff, Sharetta Smith, was sworn in as mayor after winning her election earlier in the month.

On the federal level, Lima is located in Ohio's 4th congressional district, which is represented by Republican Jim Jordan.

== Education ==
Colleges in Lima include the private University of Northwestern Ohio, the public regional campus Ohio State University at Lima, and James A. Rhodes State College.

Secondary schools in Lima include Lima Senior High School, Apollo Career Center, Lima Central Catholic High School, Lima Christian Academy, and Temple Christian School.

Schools in the county's Board of Developmental Disabilities include The Center for Autism and Dyslexia, and Marimor School.

== Media ==
Lima is served by one daily newspaper, The Lima News. In addition to the immediate Allen County area, the paper serves residents in Auglaize, Hancock, Hardin, Logan, Mercer, Putnam, Shelby and Van Wert counties.

As of the 2016–2017 television season, Lima is ranked by Nielsen Media Research as the second smallest television market in Ohio, ahead of only Zanesville, and the 190th nationwide. The Lima area is served by four major broadcast stations, with three of those stations based in the city. WLIO 8 serves as its NBC affiliate (with Fox/MyNetworkTV on DT2), while low-powered sister station WOHL-CD 35.1 operates as the market's ABC affiliate, with CBS on 35.2. WLMA 44 serves as a religious/family-entertainment station. The market's PBS member station, WBGU-TV 27, is based out of Bowling Green State University and also serves as a secondary PBS member station for the nearby Toledo market. CW viewers are served on cable by that network's Dayton affiliate, WBDT.

The Lima area is served by 22 FM and 3 AM radio stations.

== Infrastructure ==
=== Airports ===
The Lima Allen County Airport is located five nautical miles (5.8 mi; 9.3 km) southeast of Lima's central business district.

=== Roads ===
Lima is at the intersection of Ohio State Route 309 and state routes 65, 81 and 117. Interstate 75, which replaced U.S. Route 25, one of the routes of the Dixie Highway passes on the eastern perimeter of Lima. U.S. Route 30 passes east–west a few miles north of Lima.

=== Healthcare ===
The first doctor in Allen County, Samuel Jacob Lewis, was assigned to duty at Fort Amanda in 1812.

Lima has been a regional medical center since its earliest days. Currently, the city's two hospitals serve a 10-county area of northwest and west central Ohio. St. Rita's Medical Center, a level 2 trauma center, with nearly 4,000 employees as of June 2006, is Allen County's largest employer while Lima Memorial Health System ranks third. In 2005, St. Rita's embarked on a $130 million expansion expected to create up to 500 more jobs, this new addition is known as "The Medical Center of the Future". In 2018 St. Rita's name was changed to Mercy Health St. Rita's Medical Center, after the company Mercy Health that had owned St. Rita's for a while now. This name change brought new signs and uniforms to the hospital. Almost immediately after the name change, Mercy Health was acquired by another company by the name of Bon Secours. This merge has brought no changes to the hospital though.

The Roman Catholic Church Sisters of Mercy opened St. Rita's in December 1918, in the midst of a national (and global) influenza epidemic. The hospital saw major expansions 1945 and 1967. The hospital has also created satellite facilities in the surrounding towns of Ottawa, Delphos and Wapakoneta. SRMC also houses a separate hospital with the walls of the main facility. This "interior" facility, "Triumph", was implemented to serve poverty-level citizens who are unable to afford continuing care otherwise. In July 2008, St. Rita's Medical Center purchased Lima Allen County Paramedics.

Lima Memorial Health System, formerly Lima Memorial Hospital, a level 2 trauma center, can trace its roots to 1899, when it began as Lima City Hospital. Formed by the Pastors Union of Lima, the 13-bed facility was the first community hospital in northwest Ohio. During the Great Depression, the city of Lima helped to finance a larger hospital, which opened on Memorial Day 1933 on the city's east side. The region's first open-heart surgery was performed at Lima Memorial on April 22, 1997. In 1999, LMHS entered into a joint venture with Blanchard Valley Health Association ("BVHA") and ProMedica Health System.

For decades, Lima also had two other hospitals with different missions. The Ottawa Valley Hospital, which opened in 1909 as the District Tuberculosis Hospital, was one of the first in the state dedicated to the treatment of tubercular patients. The hospital treated patients from seven to 90 years old, at a time when tuberculosis was nearly always fatal. The average stay was three to five years. As treatment improved, the hospital closed, though the building was used until 1973.

The facility originally known as the Lima State Hospital for the Criminally Insane was situated on 628 acres (2.54 km^{2}) three miles (5 km) north of downtown Lima. The hospital was constructed between 1908 and 1915. Built at a cost of $2.1 million, it was the largest poured-concrete structure in the country until supplanted by the Pentagon. Patients sometimes staged dramatic protests against the conditions of their confinement, and frequently escaped (more than 300 escapes by 1978). Conditions improved significantly after 1974 as a result of a class-action lawsuit filed on behalf of the patients. In a landmark ruling, US District Judge Nicholas J. Walinski spelled out detailed requirements for assuring each patient's rights to "dignity, privacy and human care". In its last years, the state hospital was used for the filming of a made-for-television movie about the Attica Prison riots in New York. Starting in 1982, Lima State Hospital became a medium-security prison, the Lima Correctional Institution. The prison closed in 2004, though a smaller prison on the site, the Allen Correctional Institution, remains.

Founded in 1906, the Lima Rescue Mission offers support and daily necessities for unhoused and needy individuals in Lima and wider Allen County.

== Notable people ==
- Elmer Albert Apple – author of Mr. Chang and Refferty stories for Detective Story Magazine, nationally syndicated columnist, business journalist
- Dorothy Beecher Baker – early American Baha'i
- Jim Baldridge – news anchor
- Walter Baldwin – actor
- Ortha Orrie Barr Sr. – attorney, politician and original proprietor of the historic Barr Hotel
- Tom Barrington – professional football player
- James T. Begg – U.S. congressman
- James R. Black – actor and former professional football player
- Joseph Cyrus Bradfield – African-American physician and medical corpsman during World War I
- Tanner Buchanan – actor (Cobra Kai)
- Jerry Byrd – steel guitarist
- John L. Cable – U.S. congressman
- Nash Carter – professional wrestler
- Bud Collins – sportswriter and TV commentator, member of International Tennis Hall of Fame
- Steve Cook – pocket billiards player
- D. Michael Crites – U.S. Attorney for the Southern District of Ohio
- Adrian Cronauer – announcer and on-air staffer at WIMA-TV (now WLIO)
- Pamela Kyle Crossley – historian
- Mike Current – professional football player
- Phyllis Diller – comedian and actress
- Sue Downey – Miss Ohio USA 1965, Miss USA 1965
- Hugh Downs – television host, producer, and author
- Ryan Drummond – actor, voice actor, comedian, and singer
- Howard D. Eberhart – engineer and academic
- Virgil Effinger – White supremacist and a leader of the Black Legion
- Edward L. Feightner – World War II flying ace, test pilot, and Blue Angels lead solo
- William Alfred Fowler – recipient of the Nobel Prize in Physics
- Gloria Foy – dancer, singer, and vaudeville performer
- Charles William Fulton – U.S. senator
- Ann Hamilton – contemporary artist
- Joe Henderson – jazz tenor saxophonist
- Rosemary Hinkfuss – member of the Wisconsin State Assembly
- Hit the Lights – pop punk band
- R. Duane Ireland – academic
- Al Jardine – founding member of the Beach Boys
- Brad Komminsk – professional baseball player
- Charles N. Lamison – two-term U.S. congressman
- Justin LeHew – Navy Cross recipient
- Edna de Lima – opera singer, named herself after her hometown
- Jim Lynch – professional football player
- Tom Lynch – admiral and commandant of U.S. Naval Academy
- Marilyn Meseke – Miss America 1938
- William E. Metzger, Jr. – Medal of Honor recipient
- Gary Moeller – University of Michigan football head coach
- Joe Morrison – professional football player and collegiate football coach
- Jeff Mullen – football coach
- Chloe Mustaki – footballer for the Republic of Ireland
- Matthias H. Nichols – U.S. congressman
- Jon Niese – professional baseball player
- Maidie Norman – actress and acting instructor, best known for her role in What Ever Happened to Baby Jane?
- Helen O'Connell – singer, actress, and television personality
- Michael Pitts – pastor and preacher
- Frederick Rakestraw – Justice of the Indiana Supreme Court
- Donald Richie – author of books about the Japanese people and Japanese cinema
- Ben Roethlisberger – professional football player
- Sister Christine Schenk, founder of FutureChurch
- Paul Shuey – professional baseball player
- Al Snow – professional wrestler
- Thomas L. Sprague – U.S. admiral
- Gene Stechschulte – professional baseball player
- Donald F. Steiner – biochemist, discoverer of proinsulin
- Clay Tucker – professional basketball player
- Travis Walton – collegiate basketball player
- William White – professional football player

== In popular culture ==
Musical comedy-drama television series Glee is set in the fictional William McKinley High School in Lima, although the show was filmed in Los Angeles. Lima was also the focus of the 1999 TV documentary Lost in Middle America (and What Happened Next) directed by Scott Craig.

The fictional killer of Buckwheat in 1983 episodes of Saturday Night Live, John David Stutts, was reported to be from Lima, Ohio.

Rene Russo's character from the 1999 film The Thomas Crown Affair, Catherine Banning, was from Lima.

== Sister cities ==
Lima's Sister Cities Association, formed in 1995, has one current sister city as designated by Sister Cities International. There are also two other sister city projects in progress.

- Harima, Hyōgo, Japan
