= Lima Army Tank Plant =

American government facility in Ohio

Coordinates: 40.704°N 84.132°W

Joint Systems Manufacturing Center
- Lima, Ohio
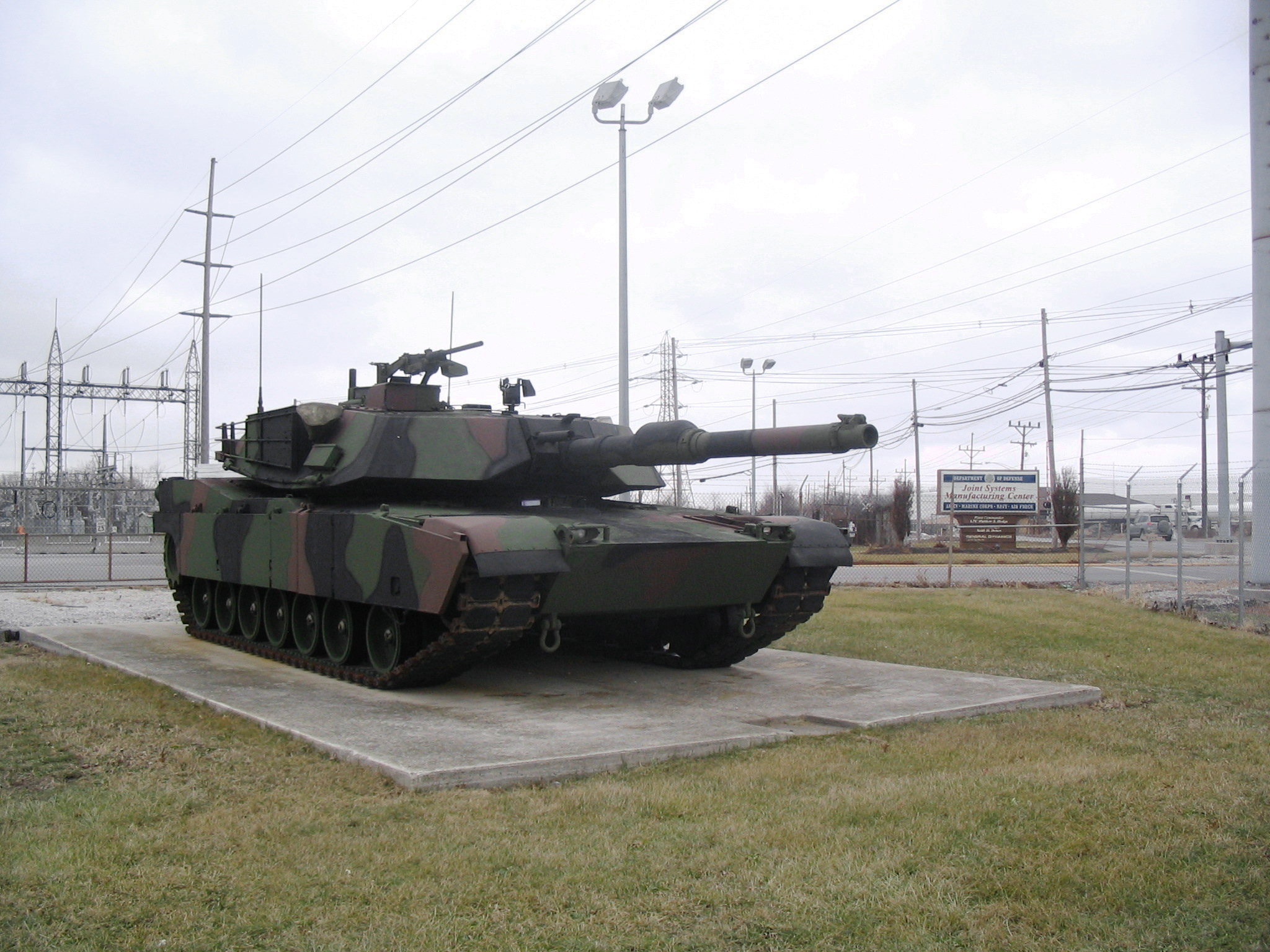
- Main entrance to Joint Systems Manufacturing Center. An M1A1 Abrams sits on a display platform to the left of the entrance gates.

Site information
- Type: Tank Plant
- Controlled by: Department of War; General Dynamics

Site history
- Built: 1941

Garrison information
- Current commander: Lt. Col. George Kloppenburg

The Joint Systems Manufacturing Center (JSMC), also known as the Lima Army Tank Plant (LATP) is a tank plant located in Lima, Ohio. It is a government-owned, contractor-operated facility currently operated by General Dynamics Land Systems. Workers at the plant are represented by UAW Local 2075.

== History ==
=== 1940s ===
In May 1942 construction began for Lima Army Tank Plant to manufacture centrifugally cast gun tubes in the steel foundry. This manufacturing method was rendered obsolete, so the army converted it to a tank depot for modifying and processing combat vehicles for export and domestic shipping.

In November 1942, a GM subsidiary, United Motors Services, took over operation of the plant to process vehicles under government contract. The plant prepared many vehicles for Europe, including the M5 light tank and the M26 Pershing tank.

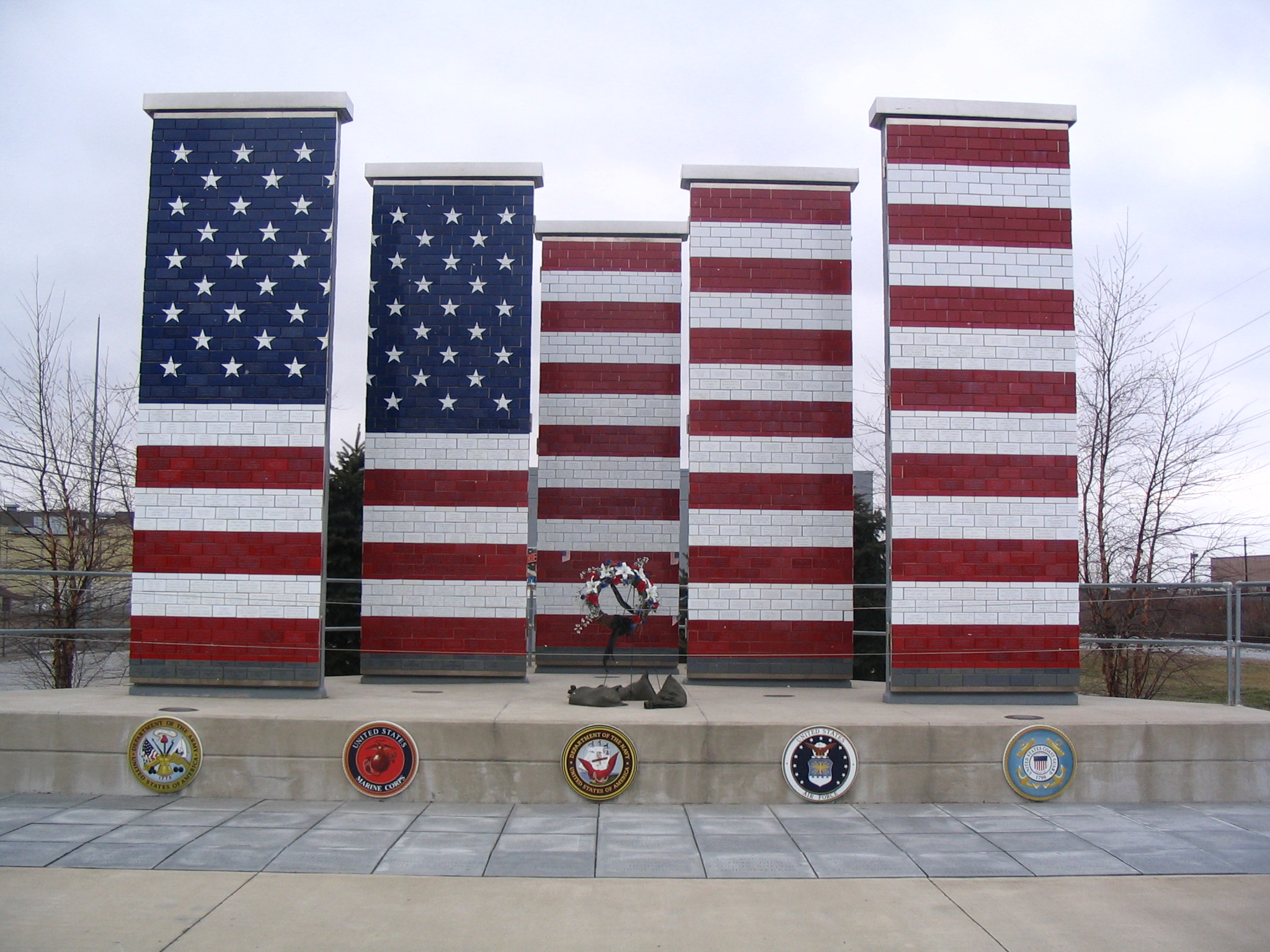
In 2007, UAW Local 2075 Veterans' Committee began construction on the Veterans Freedom Flag Monument adjacent to JSMC.

=== 1950s ===
After World War II, as the Lima Ordnance Depot, the plant served as a receiving and long-term storage facility for returning combat vehicles. During the Korean War, the plant modified and prepared tanks for shipment.

=== 1970s ===
In 1976, the army selected Chrysler's design for what would become the Abrams tank, and designated the Lima plant, operated by Chrysler, to initially build the tank. The army pressured Chrysler, in financial difficulty, to form a subsidiary, Chrysler Defense, to hold and protect the tank contract from potential bankruptcy proceedings.

=== 1980s ===
In February 1980, the first M1 Abrams rolled out of LATP. After a contract the plant began producing the Abrams at a rate of 30 a month.

Chrysler subsequently sold the Defense subsidiary to General Dynamics in 1982. In January 1985, the last M1 rolled off the assembly line, and in October, production began on the improved M1 (IPM1). The plant later manufactured the M1A1, with the first pilot vehicle built in August 1985. The M1A1 was produced at a rate of 120 a month.

=== 1990s ===
General Dynamics transferred some of the tank maintenance operations to Lima Army Tank Plant when it ended operations at the Detroit Arsenal Tank Plant in December 1996.

=== 2000s ===
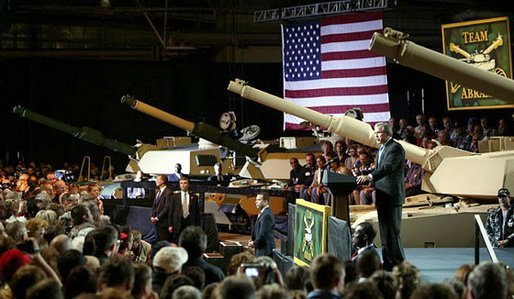
President George W. Bush addresses the employees of the Lima Army Tank Plant on April 24, 2003.

In June 2004 the facility was renamed the Joint Systems Manufacturing Center (JSMC) to reflect the decision to manufacture the Expeditionary Fighting Vehicle for the United States Marine Corps there. Despite the name change, the plant is still incorrectly referred to as the "Lima Army Tank Plant", although the plant now services all five branches of the US Armed Forces and is now controlled by the Department of Defense, rather than just the United States Army.

=== 2010s ===
==== Proposed closure ====
The Army currently has no plans of permanently closing the Joint Systems Manufacturing Center, JSMC. However, Army officials planned to end U.S. Army tank production at the JSMC between 2015 and 2016 due to the U.S. Army having built the projected number of tanks needed to properly supplement U.S. ground forces, given the current Army Force Structure (which dictates how many vehicles the U.S. Army requires for both active and reserve units; as well as, contingency storage in case additional vehicles are needed in time of war). In 2011, the U.S. Army was able to convince Congress that it still required further tank production, so in 2013, the United States Congress funded the production of additional tanks. These additional tanks however are currently slated to be put into storage until a time the U.S. Army requires them to supplement their forces. This latest Congressional order specifies the creation of ~200 "brand new" tanks to be placed in reserve storage, in accordance to the U.S. Army reducing its strategic number of tanks required for active duty. This supplemented number of new tanks is in addition to the ~4000 tanks already in storage across the nation. Along with the ~200 Abrams ordered by Congress, the plant simultaneously produced Israeli Namer APC chassis and Abrams Foreign Military tanks, during the allotted time frame. The Army considered a layaway of the plant if their production met its quota before 2017, in addition to reallocating unused equipment. General Dynamics Land Systems, which currently operates the government owned factory, opposed the closure, arguing that suspension of operations would 'increase long-term costs' and 'reduce flexibility'. Proposed efforts of decommissioning the plant are estimated to cost around $380 million, with an additional $1.3 billion needed to restart production after such a diminishing if required at a later date. A bill which passed in the U.S. Senate, allocated $272 million in funds toward the plant to facilitate its continuation of regular operations through July 2014. However, GDLS continues to lobby for an additional $180M.

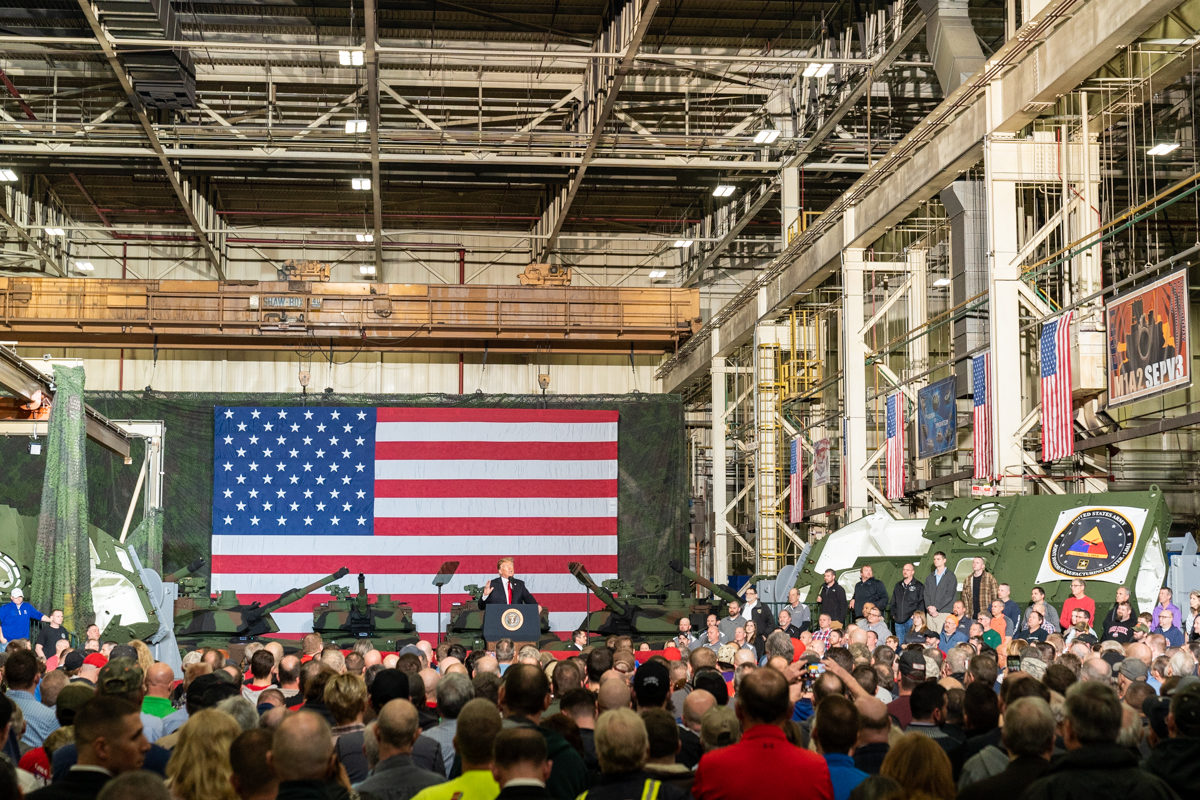
President Donald Trump delivers remarks on March 20, 2019.

In December 2016 a new funding program of $1.2 billion was allocated for the production of the Abrams tank and Stryker armored vehicle to be built at the Joint Systems Manufacturing Center in Lima. As of July 2018, the factory was producing 11 Abrams tanks a month. During a trip to Ohio, President Donald Trump visited the plant on March 20, 2019, where he gave a speech affirming his commitment to keeping the plant up and running. The Army announced in early 2019 that it would spend ~$714 million to upgrade the M1A1 Abrams at the plant.

== Tanks produced ==
- M5 Stuart (1941–1944)
- M26 Pershing (1943–1945)
- M1 Abrams (1980–1986)
- M1A1 Abrams (1986–present)
