= Lima Rescue Mission =

Coordinates: 40°44′38″N 84°06′09″W

The Lima Rescue Mission is a city mission located in Lima, Ohio. Founded on November 1, 1906, by Adam Welty, the mission, which is funded completely by donations, provides daily necessities for homeless and needy individuals in and around Allen County, Ohio. It is the second oldest gospel rescue mission in Ohio, and the only facility of its kind in west central Ohio. The mission is a member of the Association of Gospel Rescue Missions, part of the global city mission movement.

== History ==
On November 1, 1906, mission founder Rev. Adam Welty moved his family from Bluffton, Ohio to a new home at 207 East North Street in Lima, Ohio. This large rented house would serve as a residence for the family and also a haven for transient men needing food and lodging. It was not until later that Rev. Welty learned that their new home was in the heart of what was then the "red light district" of the city. Within a few years, the house proved inadequate to care for the number of men coming for help. Although there were no funds in the Mission treasury for expansion Rev. Welty decided that a larger building was necessary. A site at the corner of Central and Wayne was selected and secured with a down payment of $200.00 which Mrs. Welty had managed to save. Construction finally began in March 1916, and was suspended for a time during World War I. In June 1920, the mission was finally able to move into its spacious new building, which is still in use today.

In the late 1940s the Rescue Mission began ministering to youth through child evangelism classes held in the mission's chapel. Over time the classes grew and it was realized that a larger, more dedicated space would be needed. In 1964 a large house, known as the "Children's Chapel" was purchased to meet this need. In 1974, land was purchased to build a new summer day camp, Camp Roberts. The camp, which occupies 54 acres (220,000 m^{2}) in Shawnee Township, consists of a lodge, pool, chapel and recreation building.

== Target Audience ==
- Poor and homeless men
- At risk youth

== Basic Services ==
- Emergency overnight shelter
- Meals served daily
- Clothing distribution
- Transitional housing

== Programs ==
- Mighty Men life recovery & discipleship program
- Daily chapel services, Bible studies
- Group & individual Biblical counseling
- Children's Chapel after school Bible classes and activities for inner city youth
- Camp Roberts summer day camp for inner city youth

== Statistics (2005) ==
- 14,545 meals served
- 3,561 lodgings provided in overnight shelter
