= Joseph Cyrus Bradfield =

American physician (1889–1936)

- Born: February 19, 1889; Mt. Vernon, Ohio
- Died: April 11, 1936 (aged 47); Lima, Ohio
- Resting place: Woodlawn Cemetery, Lima, Ohio, USA
- Education: Mt. Vernon High School; Starling Medical College (1911)
- Occupation: Physician
- Title: Captain
- Spouse: Edith Payne (m.1912)
- Children: Joseph Cyrus Bradfield(b. 1914); Madeline Bradfield
- Parent(s): Joseph Bradfield; Elizabeth Williams

Joseph Cyrus Bradfield, M.D. (February 19, 1889 – April 11, 1936) was a prominent African-American physician situated in Lima, Ohio, well known for his civic commitment to the Lima community. The Bradfield Community Center in Lima was named after him for all his efforts towards the African American community. He was also a member of the NAACP. He served in World War I (as a part of the Medical Reserve Corps) in the 92nd Division, working primarily in the 365th Field Hospital.

== Early life ==
Bradfield was born on February 19, 1889, to Joseph Bradfield and Elizabeth Williams. The family was situated in Mt. Vernon, Ohio, and this is where Joseph remained throughout his childhood and he even graduated from Mt. Vernon High School. After finishing high school, Bradfield went to Columbus in order to attend Starling Medical College. At the time Starling Medical College had been its own institution before a few years later being absorbed into Ohio State University. Bradfield graduated from Starling on May 24, 1911, in the college's Fourth Commencement ceremony. He remained in Columbus for about a year and met his future wife. Bradfield moved to Lima, Ohio in 1913 to open his own medical practice, despite the fact that at this point there were only approximately 978 African Americans living in Lima.

== Military service ==
In 1917, the United States joined World War I and the entire nation was in a buzz to join the effort. After the declaration of war with Germany, many African-Americans were turned away from the local recruiting stations. Unprepared for a large-scale conflict, the United States Army had only four black regiments, and many commanders would not allow mixing of blacks and whites in their units. Also, the black regiments themselves were not trusted to be sent to Europe, as many of the higher-ups possessed a lack of confidence in black soldiers as fighters. Fort Des Moines Provisional Army Officer Training School had been opened for training African-American men as there had been a huge influx of African-American volunteers and a petition was erected by the students of Howard University. However, there was still some discontent at the facility as many soldiers found that he had been unfairly assessed for merely being black.

When Bradfield answered the military's call for physicians he was immediately given the rank of first lieutenant in the Army Medical Reserve Corps. Like all the African-American recruits, he was sent to Fort Des Moines for medical training at the Medical Officers Training Camp. After completing his training, he was assigned as a medical officer with 365th Ambulance Company. In the record for Noncombatants of the U.S. army, he was listed in the regiment as a ‘colored’ soldier.

When arriving at France, Bradfield was reassigned to work in the 365th Field Hospital near Raon Letape. He had much work on his hands due to the aggressive assaults German forces were sending to both French and American troops. The majority of the division was situated in the trenches, and he had to deal with a large number of his cases recovering or dying from Influenza. Many soldiers were also gassed, which the Germans sent over to drive away the large number of reinforcements coming from the United States. Though not many deaths resulted from the gassing, many patients suffered from lung problems, which was also a large part of his work. Before the war's conclusion, he was promoted to the rank of captain. He was honorably discharged in 1918 and also became a lifelong member of the American Legion.

== Career ==
When he was discharged Bradfield returned to his family in Lima and continued his work in his medical practice. Bradfield was mainly situated in the Allen county of Lima, according to the Journal of the American Medical Association. He also entered St. Rita's Hospital staff. It was during the 1920s that Bradfield demonstrated his dedication to the African American community. He became an active member of the Republican Executive Committee of Allen County and was avid about have African Americans more involved in politics. He also partook in events conducted by the NAACP and at one point, when Bradfield wanted to leave Lima, the NAACP tried hard to get him to stay. They succeeded.

== Personal life ==
In 1912, Bradfield met the young Edith Payne in Columbus. She followed him to Lima and the two married in December 1912. Together the couple had two children, a boy named Joseph Cyrus Bradfield (born 1914) and Madeline Bradfield. After her death, Edith was buried alongside her husband.

== Death ==
Bradfield died on April 11, 1936, at the age of 47. He had suffered from a two-week struggle with pneumonia and died in St. Rita's Hospital. He was buried in Woodlawn Cemetery in Lima. In 1933, Bradfield had been a part of a committee in Lima made to promote social opportunities of the African American community. In July 1938, the Bradfield Community Association was formed as a result of that group. The Association was later made into the Bradfield Community Center which is active to this day.
