= Ohio State University at Lima =

Regional campus of Ohio State University

Coordinates: 40.738348°N 84.027676°W

The Ohio State University at Lima
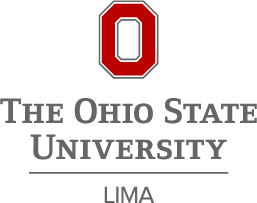
- Type: Public regional campus
- Established: 1960; 66 years ago
- Parent institution: Ohio State University
- President: Ravi V. Bellamkonda
- Dean: Margaret Young
- Faculty: 95
- Students: 817 (fall 2023)
- Undergraduates: 815
- Postgraduates: 2
- Location: Lima, Ohio, United States
- Campus: Suburban 565 acres
- Colors: Scarlet and Gray
- Website: lima.osu.edu

The Ohio State University at Lima (Ohio State Lima) is a regional campus of Ohio State University in Lima, Ohio. It offers over 140 courses and 12 bachelor degree programs in science and liberal arts. Ten of 12 programs are four-year programs at Lima. Two of them are baccalaureate completion programs. In addition to regional accreditation, Ohio State Lima has baccalaureate program accreditation with NCATE. The campus practices open admissions. Students can start at Lima and finish their degrees at The Ohio State University, Columbus with one of Ohio State's 200+ majors. The Ohio State University at Lima offers over 20 student clubs and organizations.

== Facilities ==
The Lima Campus Library has 76,000 volumes and 200+ journal subscriptions. Library databases also provide access to thousands of online journals.
