= United States Post Office (Lima, Ohio) =

- U.S. Post Office
- U.S. National Register of Historic Places
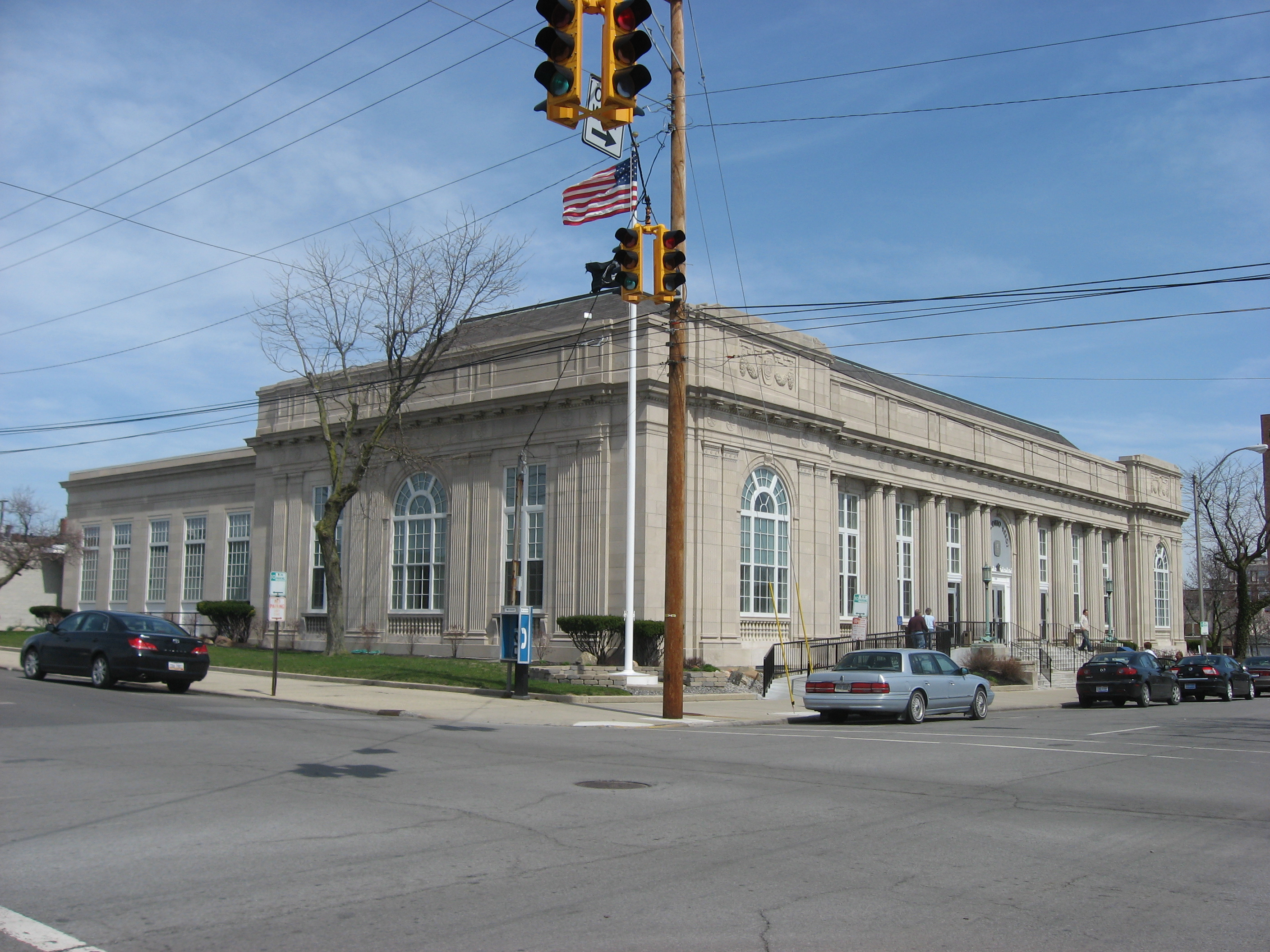
- Front of the post office

- Location within Ohio Location within the United States
- Location: 326 W. High St., Lima, Ohio
- Coordinates: 40°44′29″N 84°6′32″W
- Area: less than one acre
- Built: 1930
- Architectural style: Classical Revival
- MPS: Lima MRA
- NRHP reference No.: 82001356
- Added to NRHP: October 7, 1982

The United States Post Office in Lima, Ohio, United States is a historic Neoclassical building erected in 1930. Located along High Street west of the center of the city, the post office is one of the newest major buildings in the city's downtown.

== History ==
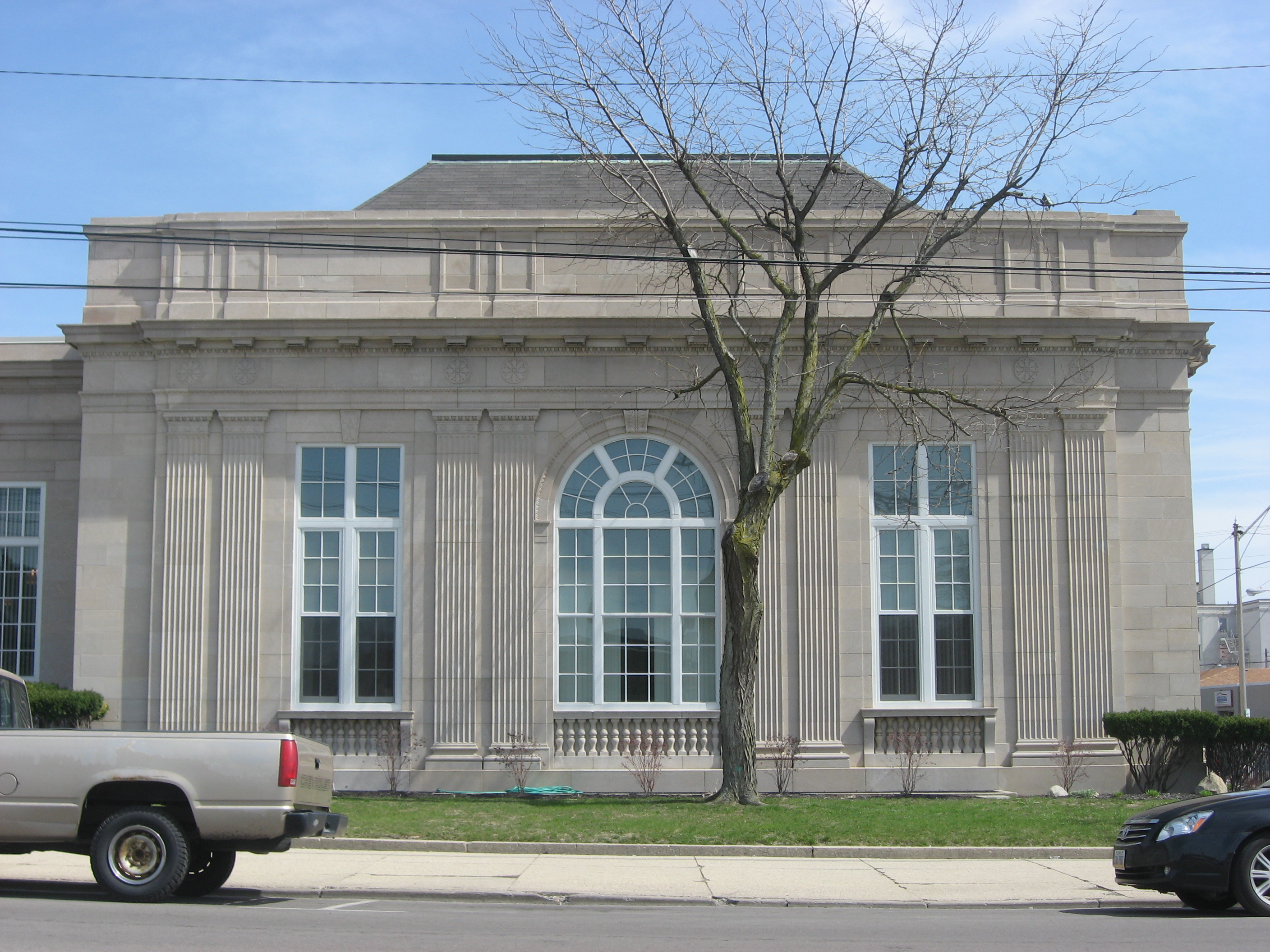
Western side

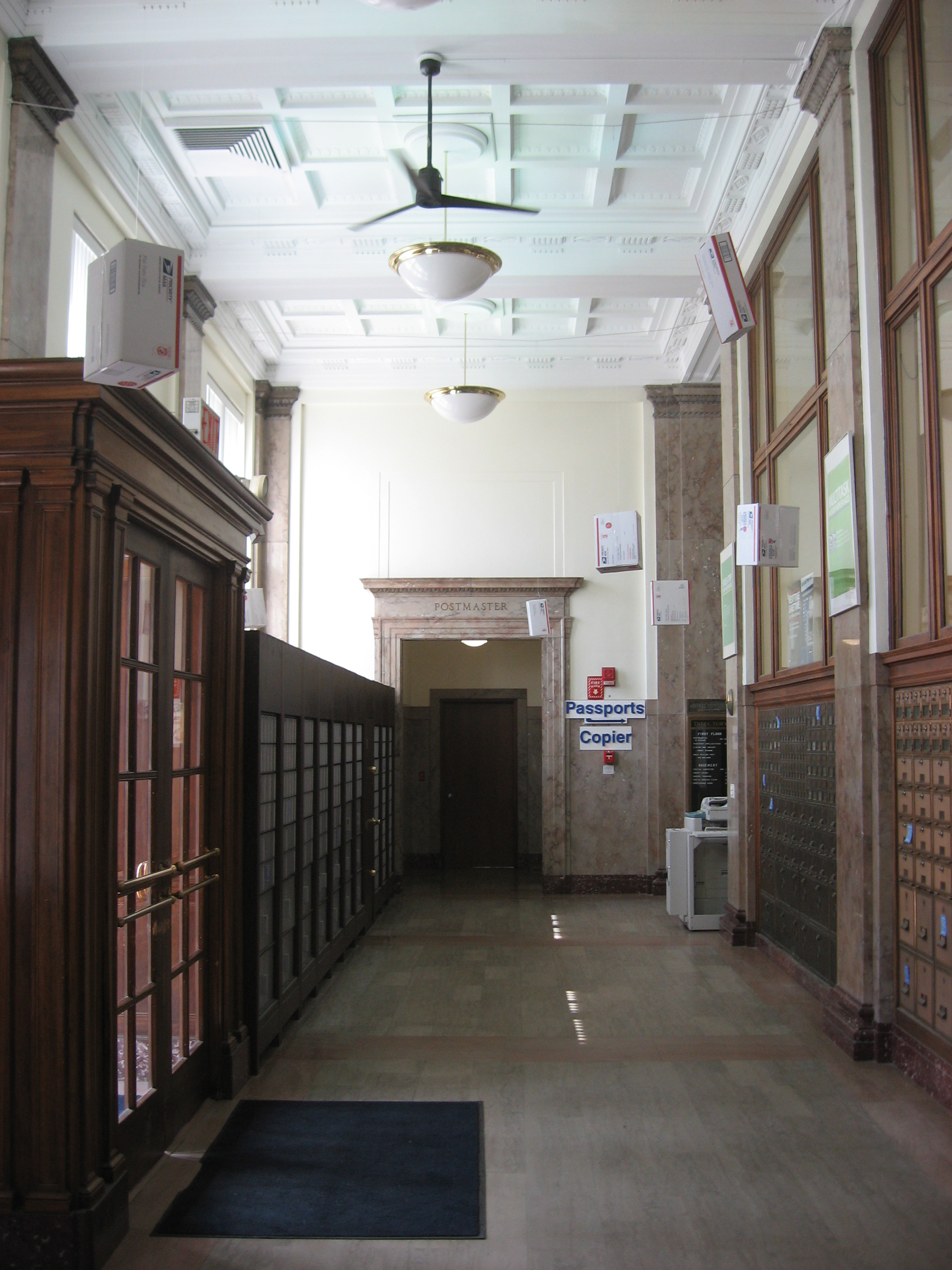
Interior

Lima's first post office was built at the intersection of High and Elizabeth Streets. When officials decided to replace this structure with a newer building, the lot chosen was two blocks to the west.

Lima reached its height during the early years of the twentieth century. As the city became a major center for Standard Oil and as the hometown Lima Locomotive Works became a major player in the manufacturing of locomotives, the economy boomed, and many large buildings were erected in and around downtown. Although the 1930 post office was built near the end of this boom period, its architecture greatly resembles that of many buildings constructed during the boom.

== Architecture ==
Completed in 1931, the current post office is a single-story concrete building. Each end of the building features pilasters, doubly fluted, and a large triple casement window with a balustrade beneath. Elsewhere in the building, the casement windows are three panels tall and two panels wide; many windows feature a prominent transom. Customers can enter the building through any of three double doors, which are located between pairs of pilasters carven to resemble columns.

=== Interior ===
The interior of the post office is built primarily of marble and of hardwoods. Its ceiling is constructed primarily of heavily contrasting marble coffering.

== Recognition ==
In 1982, the post office was listed on the National Register of Historic Places because of its well-preserved architecture. It was one of seventeen buildings listed on the National Register as part of the "Lima Multiple Resource Area."
