= Howard D. Eberhart =

American engineer

- Born: June 16, 1906; Lima, Ohio, U.S.
- Died: July 18, 1993 (aged 87); Berkeley, California, U.S.
- Education: BS: University of Oregon; MSE: Oregon State University; EngD: University of California
- Occupations: Engineer, College Administrator, and Professor

Howard Davis Eberhart (August 16, 1906 – July 18, 1993) was an American engineer noted for his design of artificial limbs and other prosthetic devices. Professor Eberhart was chairman of the Department of Civil Engineering at University of California, Berkeley and a member of the National Academy of Engineering. The University of California called Eberhart "one of UC Berkeley's most highly respected and acclaimed teachers in civil engineering, and a pioneer of research in artificial limbs". In 1977 Howard was elected to the National Academy of Engineering "for pioneering studies of human locomotion, application of structural engineering to prosthetic devices, and leadership of interdisciplinary engineering research."

== Chronology ==
- 1906 born August 16 in Lima, Ohio
- 1929:B.S. degree in architecture, the University of Oregon
- 1935: M.S. degree in civil engineering, Oregon State University
- 1936: instructor, the University of California, Berkeley
- 1948: full professor of civil engineering, the University of California, Berkeley
- 1959-1963 and 1971-1974: chairman of the Department of Civil Engineering, the University of California, Berkeley
- 1974: retired from UC Berkeley
