= First National Center (Oklahoma City) =

Skyscraper in Oklahoma City, Oklahoma

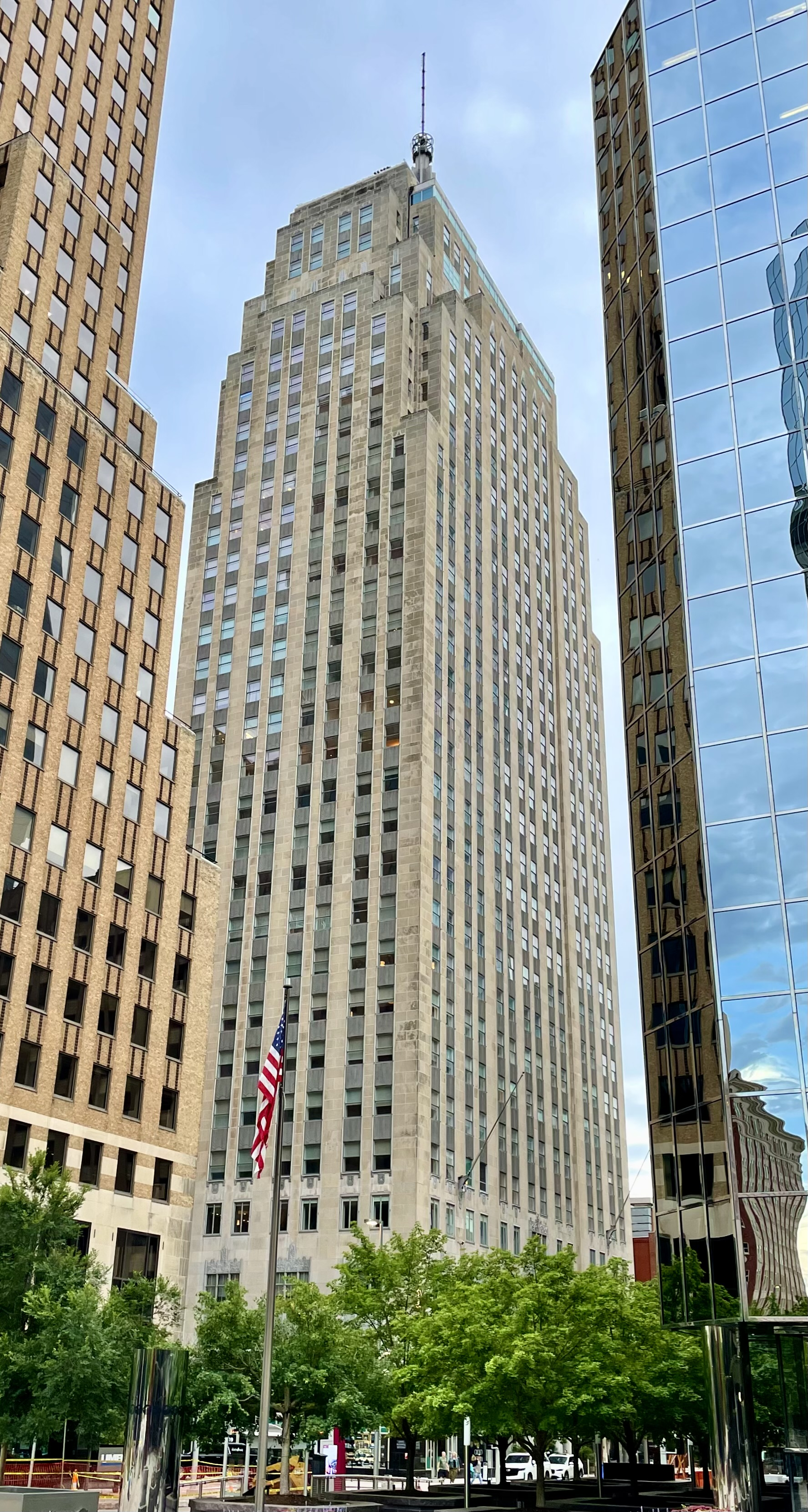
- Looking southeast in 2023
- Interactive map of the First National Center area

General information
- Status: Completed
- Type: Apartments; Hotel; Retail; Restaurants
- Architectural style: Art Deco, Neoclassical
- Location: 120 N. Robinson Ave., Oklahoma City, Oklahoma; United States
- Coordinates: 35°28′06″N 97°30′58″W
- Opening: 1931
- Cost: $5,000,000

Height
- Roof: 406 ft (124 m)

Technical details
- Floor count: 33
- Floor area: 497,371 square feet (46,200 m^{2})

Design and construction
- Architect: Weary & Alford Company
- Main contractor: Manhattan Construction Company
- First National Bank and Trust Company Building
- U.S. National Register of Historic Places
- NRHP reference No.: 100002220
- Added to NRHP: March 15, 2018

First National Center, formerly known as First National Bank Building, is a prominent mixed-use skyscraper in downtown Oklahoma City. The art deco tower is 406 feet (136 m) tall at the roof, and is 446 feet (150 m) at its spire and contains 33 floors. The building was constructed in 1931 at an original square footage of 451,000 square feet (41,900 m^{2}) by the First National Bank and Trust Company of Oklahoma City. Additions in 1957 and 1972 brought the square footage to 998,000 square feet (92,700 m^{2}) of office space before the 2022 restoration and remodeling reduced it to 497,371 square feet (46,207.3 m^{2}).

First National Center is currently the third tallest building in Oklahoma City, after the Devon Tower and BancFirst Tower, respectively. The tower is the sixth tallest building in the state of Oklahoma. The tower has a notable architectural resemblance to the Empire State Building in New York City.

The First National Center is connected to adjacent buildings in the downtown area via the Oklahoma City Underground series of tunnels and elevated walkways.

== History ==
The owner of the building was the First National Bank Corporation for use by the First National Bank and Trust Company of Oklahoma City. The bank's president E.P. Johnson and stockholders S.M. Gloyd, W.T. Hales, H.R. Hudson, R.A. Vose, and H.M. Johnson comprised the building's ownership and underwrote the construction. The building was built by Manhattan Construction Company. The cost of the building was $5 million.

Work began in September 1930, with the demolition of several smaller buildings on the site. By January 1931, the site was clear, and construction on the tower began February 1 and was completed by November of the same year. The bank moved into the building on December 14, 1931. When it was completed, the 33-story skyscraper was declared to be the fourth tallest building west of the Mississippi River.

In 1957, the 14-story First National Office Building was completed on the east side of the tower, and in 1972 an adjoining 14-story L-shaped annex was added that went east to Broadway Avenue.

Among many businesses of early day Oklahoma City, the Beacon Club was once located at the top of the building.

The First National Bank Corporation ran into troubled times in the 1980s, and failed. However, due to Oklahoma's liberalization of interstate banking, First Interstate Bank of Los Angeles assumed the assets of First National upon its failure in 1985, and opened under their new name the following day. At the time, First National's failure was the largest bank in the nation to have sought FDIC protection. First Interstate operated the bank until 1991, when they sold it off to Boatmen's Bancshares of St. Louis.

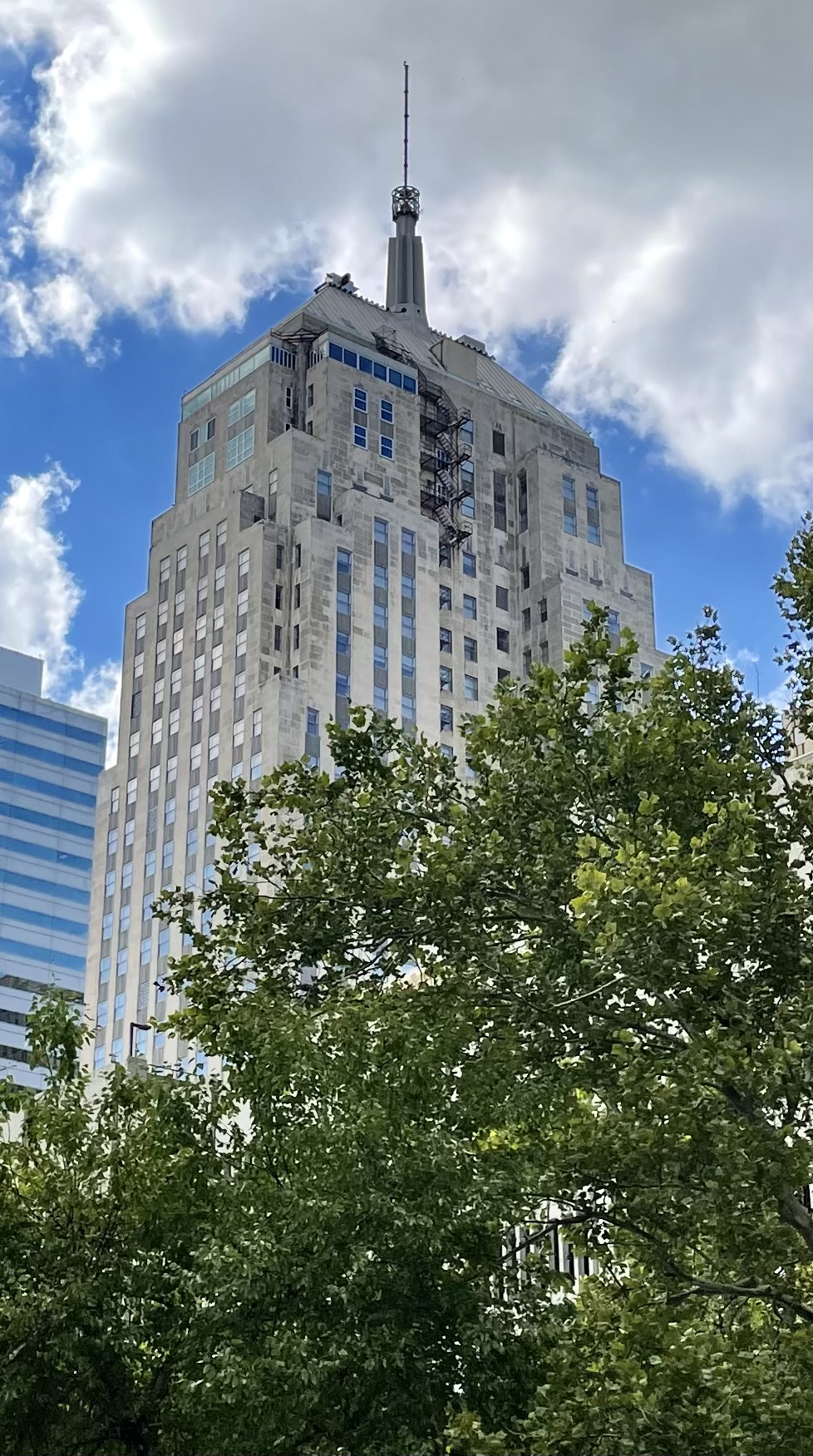
Looking northwest.

In May 1992, Boatmen's announced it would vacate the building and the banking lobby. Boatmen's had acquired Leadership Bank, and chose to utilize their headquarters in Leadership Square to the immediate northwest of First National Center. Boatmen's was later acquired by NationsBank – now Bank of America – and retains the Leadership Square headquarters for their Oklahoma City operations. Since Boatmen's departure, no bank has utilized First National Center. The building was sold to a California buyer for $21 million, with plans of a major renovation of the property. The buyer was organized as two separate entities, First National I, LLC and First National II, LLC, both of which are part of the Milbank Real Estate Group, led by chief executive officer Aaron Yashouafar. Renovations begun, with plans to restore it to its 1930s glory. The buyer, however, ran out of money and filed for bankruptcy in the U.S. Bankruptcy Court for the Western District of Oklahoma in October 2010. After filing for bankruptcy, restoration activities within the building ceased until 2017, leaving the building in apparent disrepair due to the halfway completed construction projects. The famous "Great Banking Hall" was, and continues to be, used for various social events, galas, balls, and proms.

In 2007, the building had a 40% occupancy rate. By 2016, the occupancy rate had dropped to less than 20%.

In August 2015, state agencies that had leased space within the building announced emergency relocations due to deteriorating conditions, including non-functioning elevators and an imminent air conditioning cutoff due to unpaid bills. On September 3, 2015, U.S. Federal Judge Stephen P. Friot ordered that the building be placed in receivership and for air conditioning and elevator service be restored as soon as possible.

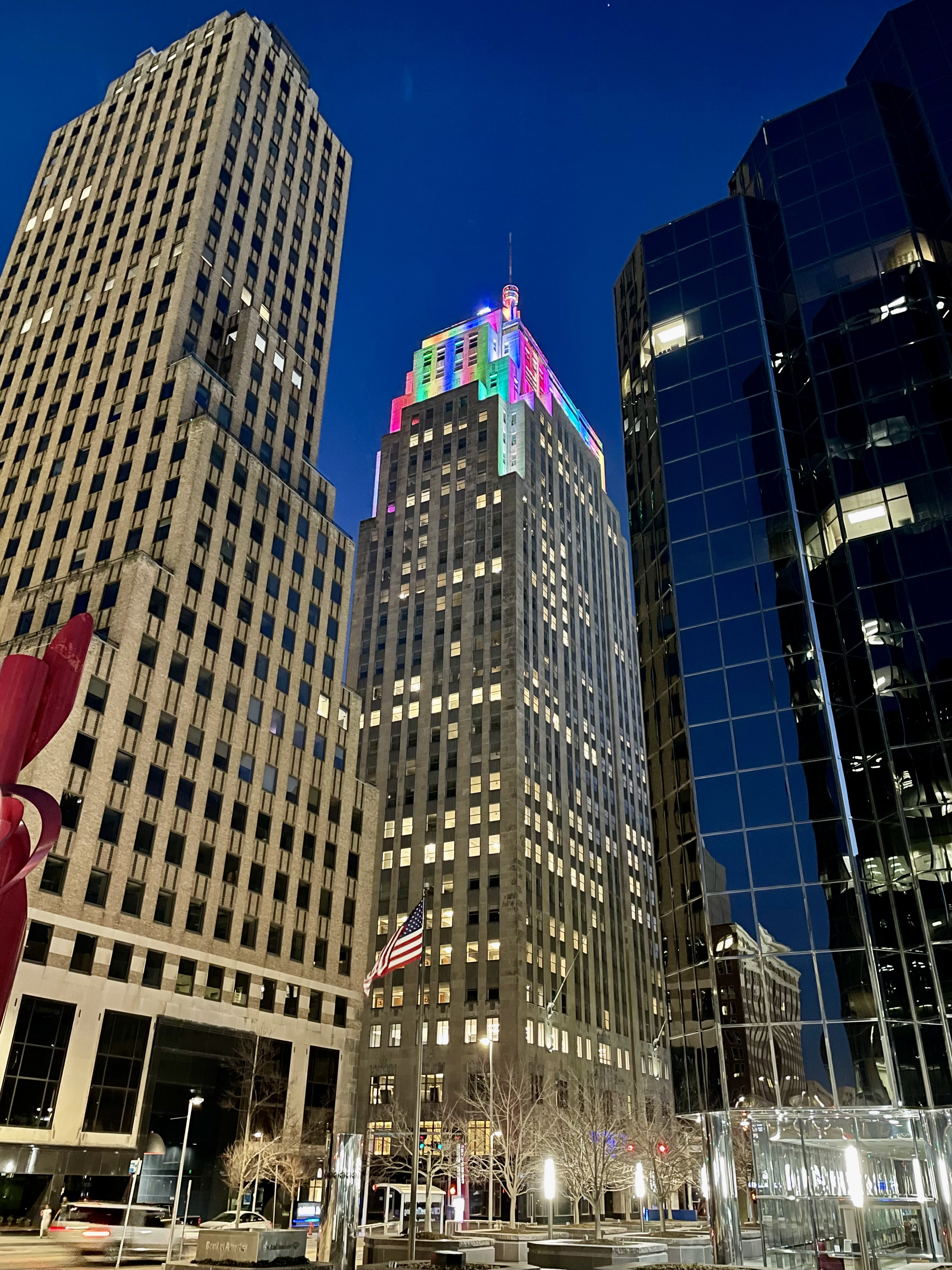
At night with multi-colored lighting.

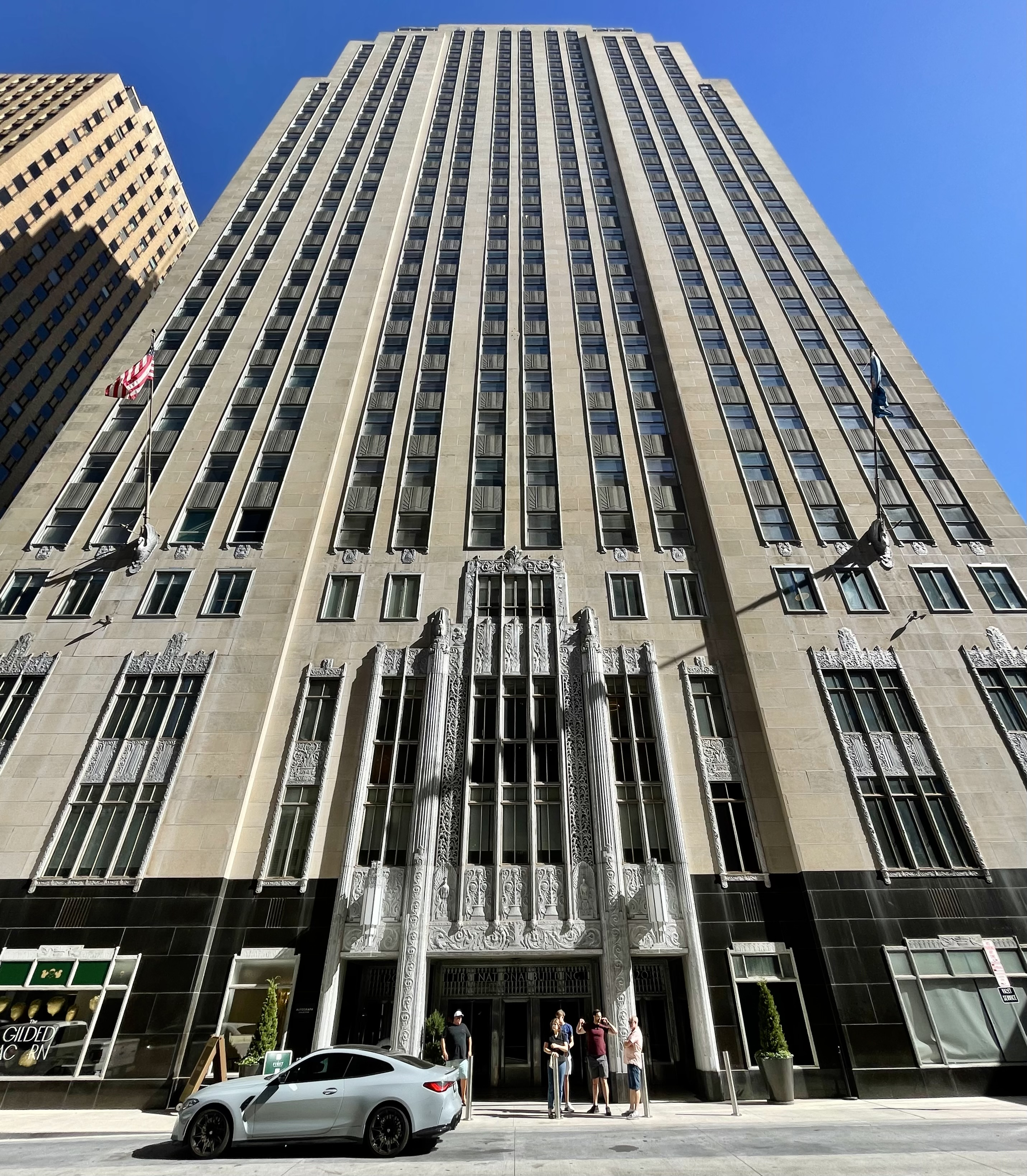
West facade and main entrance.

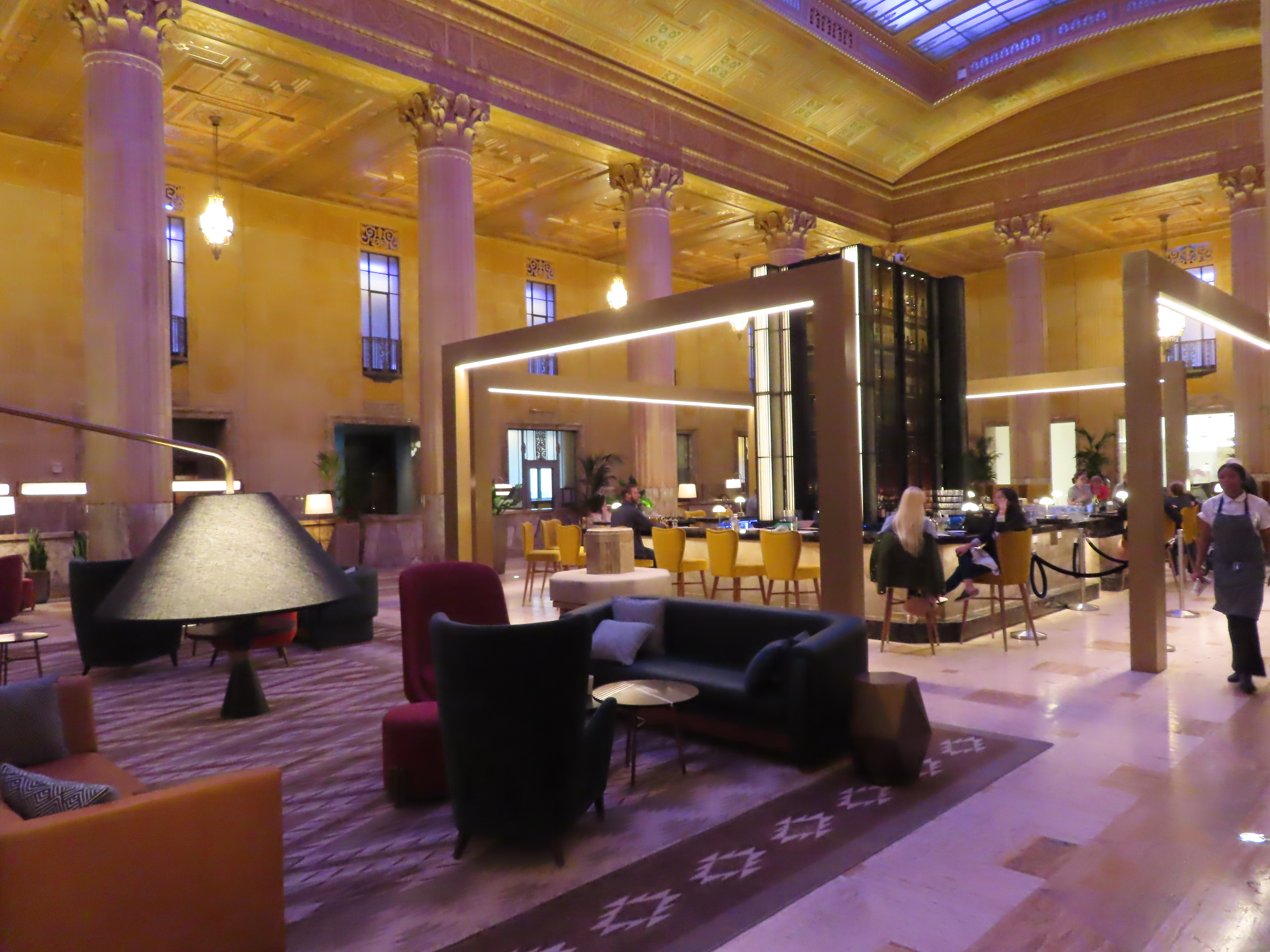
A restaurant named "Tellers" now occupies the former main banking hall (2021 photo).

In January 2017, the sale was finalized to local developers Gary Brooks and Charlie Nicholas for $23 million with plans to restore for use as a hotel, apartments, and offices. The cost to renovate and remodel the building into 146 hotel rooms, 193 apartments, retail and restaurant space, and to convert the 1957 and 1972 14-story additions into a 700-space parking garage was more than $275 million. The restoration included repair to murals, decorative painted ceilings, stone columns, cast stone, metal finishes, vault doors and safes. The basement and ground floor house a mixture of retail, restaurant and commercial spaces. The Great Banking Hall has been restored and is utilized as a public lobby and event space. The hotel is an Autograph Collection named 'The National' while the apartments are 'The First Residences at First National'. First National Center reopened in April 2022.

== Architecture ==
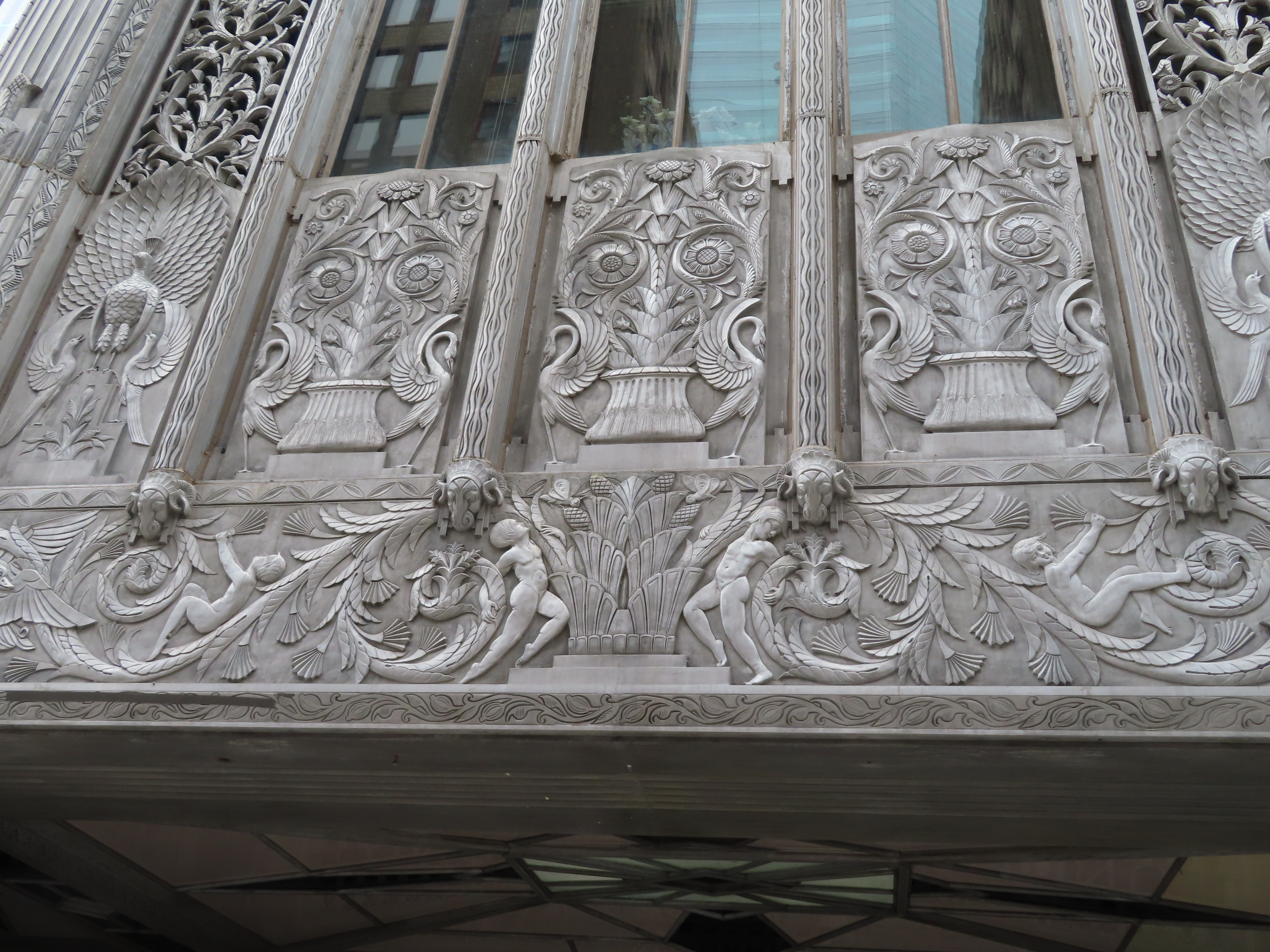
Aluminum relief panels above the main entrance

First National Center was built with an Art Deco, Neoclassical style inside and out, featuring polished aluminum, granite, glass and several varieties of marble from around the world. Rising 446 feet above the sidewalk, the building was topped out with an aluminum aviation tower and a red beacon light above a polished aluminum notched roof line. The aviation tower originally housed a massive white rotating beacon that was visible for 75 miles. When radio navigation superseded visual navigation after WWII, the powerful white was replaced with a lower-power red warning light. The 32nd floor was a public observation deck. One of First National's most distinctive features is its night lighting, where the upper-story setbacks are lit white. There have been times when the lighting has changed – after 9/11, the setbacks were lit in red, white and blue tiers – which is still done on July 4. For many years, a cross was created by lighting office windows during Christmas. This is no longer done due to the fact that later construction obscures the First National from many views, but it has been taken up by the SandRidge and Chase Towers.

The Weary & Alford Company of Chicago designed First National Center, as well as other bank buildings around the country. Manhattan Construction Co. built First National's tower, and F.H. Beaumont of Oklahoma City supervised the majority of the building's construction. Murals depicting Oklahoma's history in the four corners of the banking lobby were painted by Chicago artist Edgar Spier Cameron.

The building was listed on the National Register of Historic Places in 2018.

== Events ==
On June 22, 2006, the tower experienced an electrical fire in its basement and was evacuated for the workday. There were no long-term effects from the fire. A section of Robinson Avenue adjacent to the building was temporarily closed.

On November 5, 2017, a fire broke out on the 26th floor of the tower.

On December 9, 2017, a fire broke out on the 7th floor of the tower.

== Gallery ==
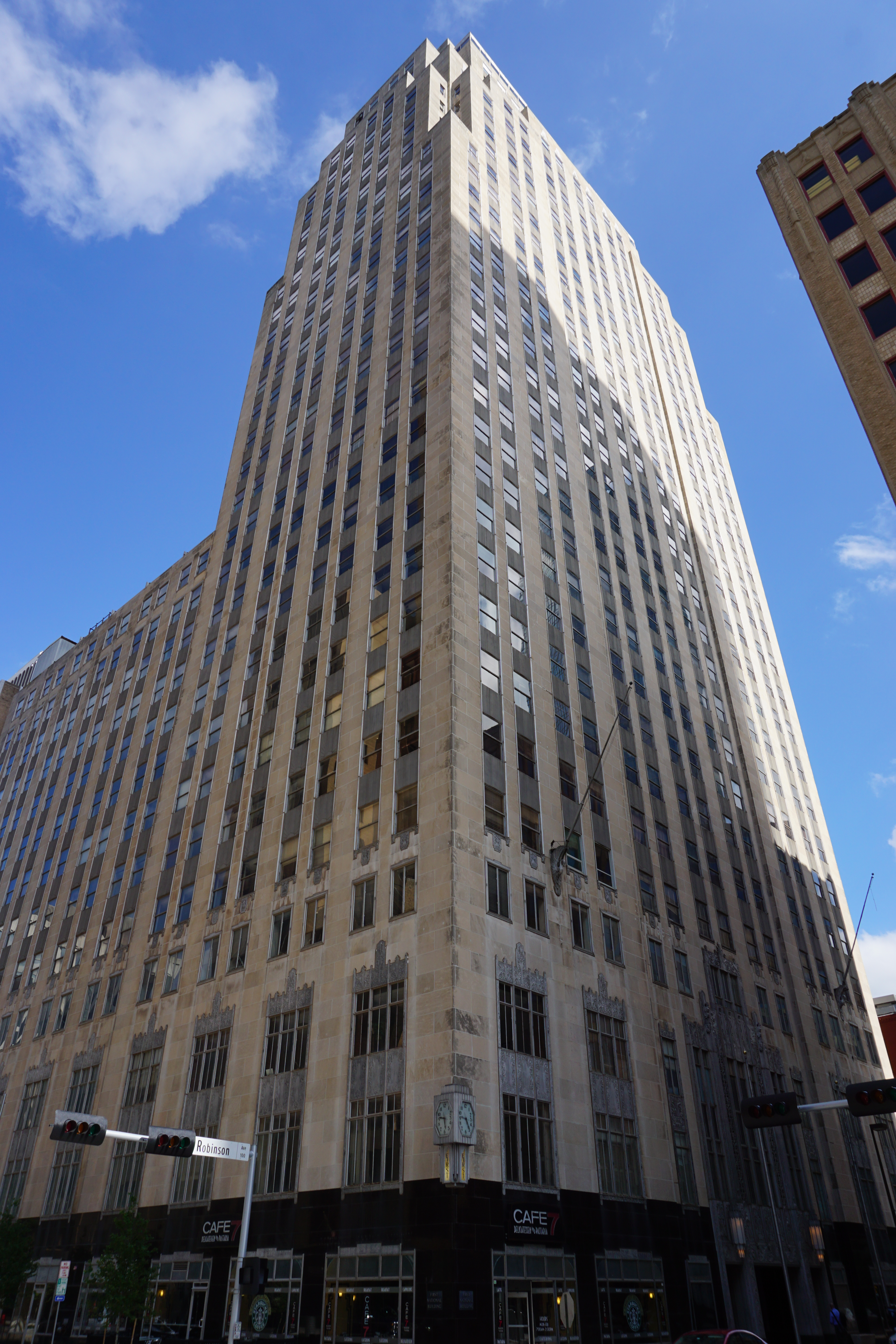
Looking up from Park and Robinson Avenues

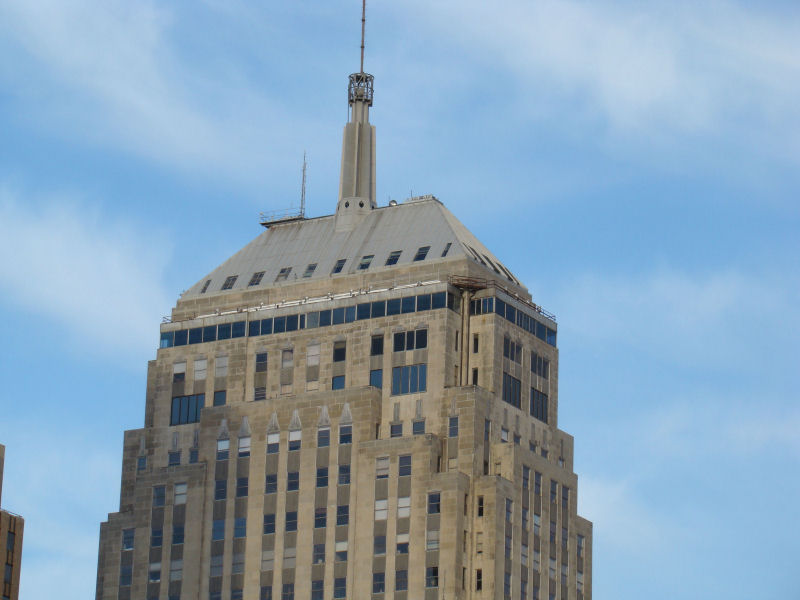
Top of the tower

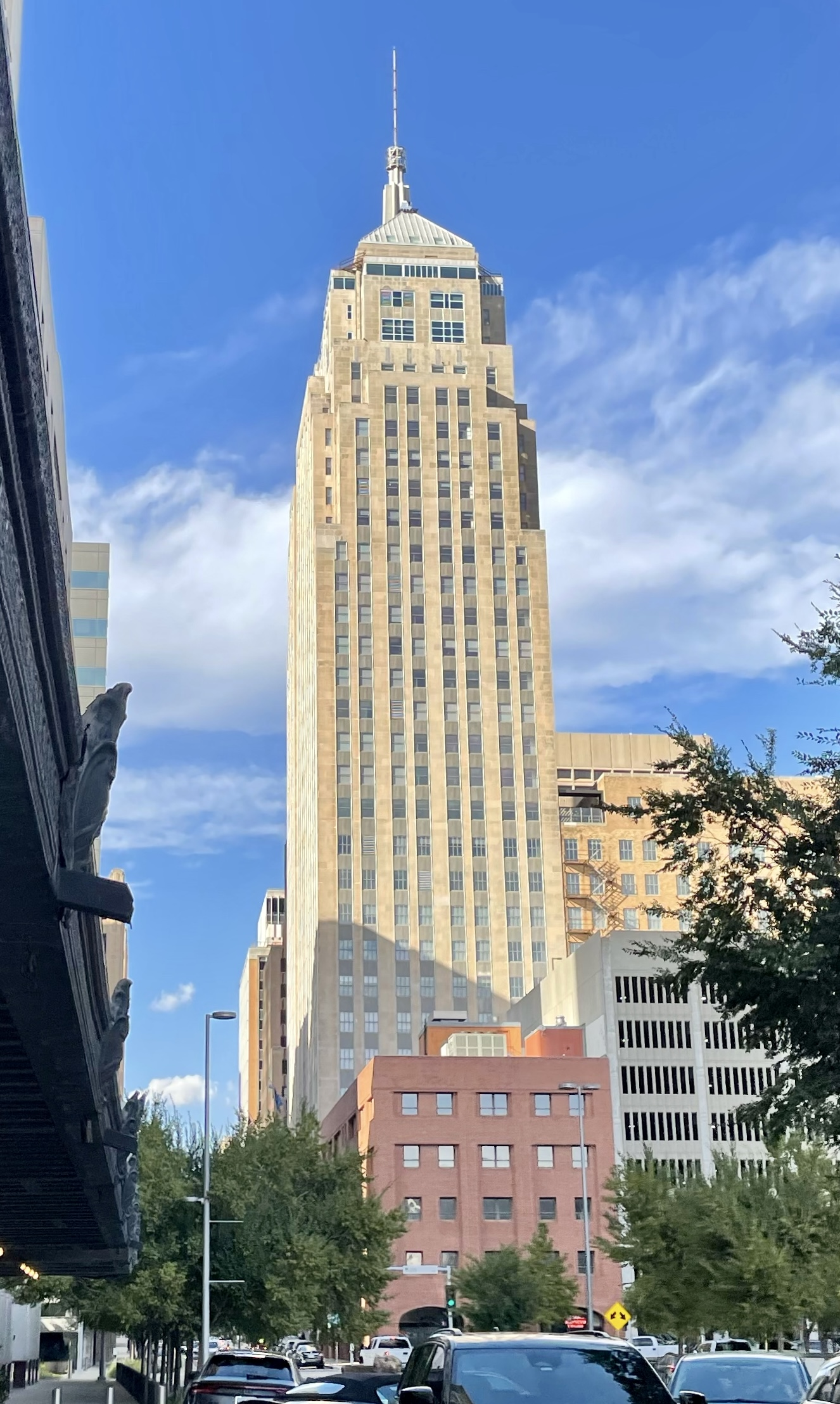
Looking north

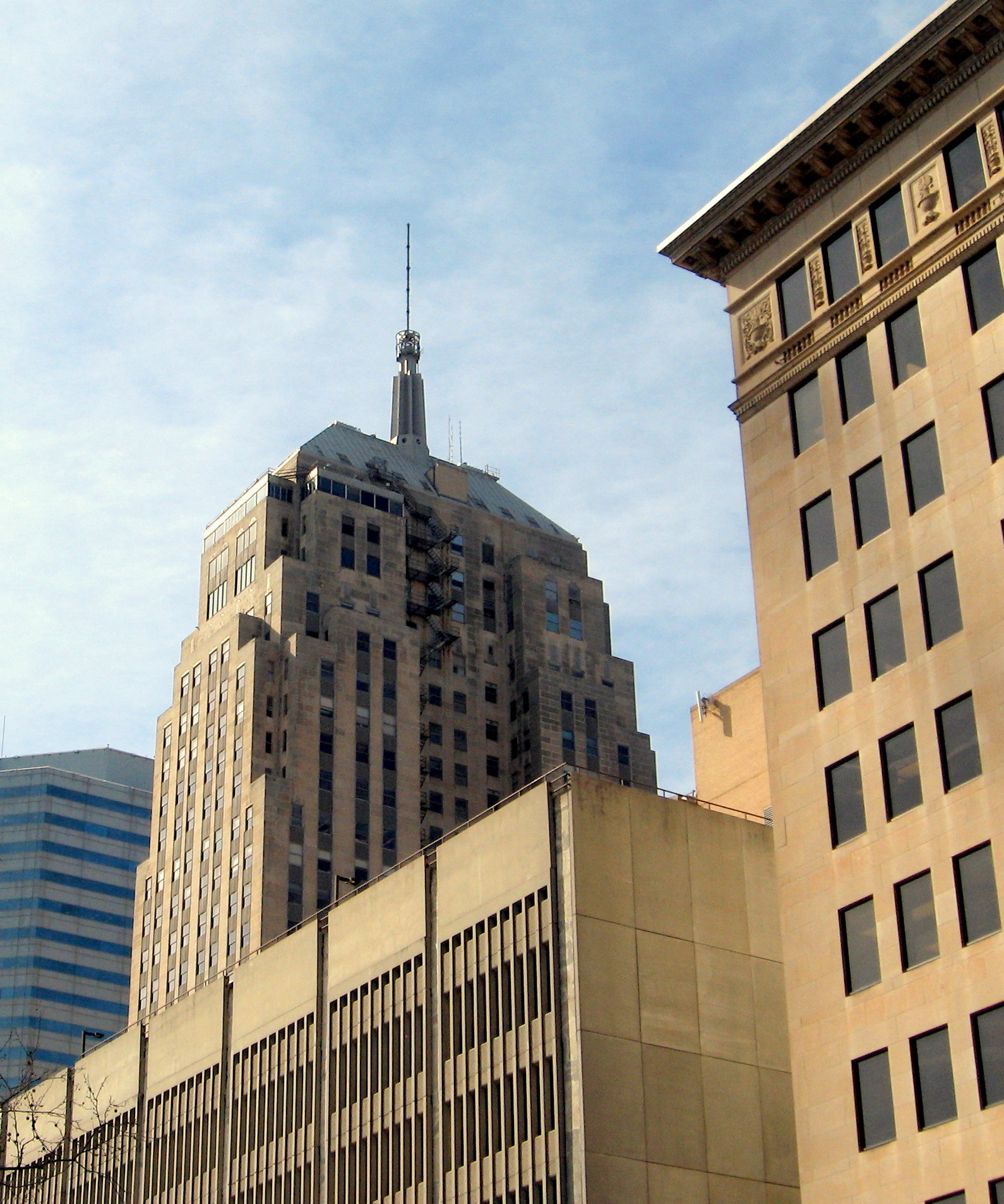
Looking northwest

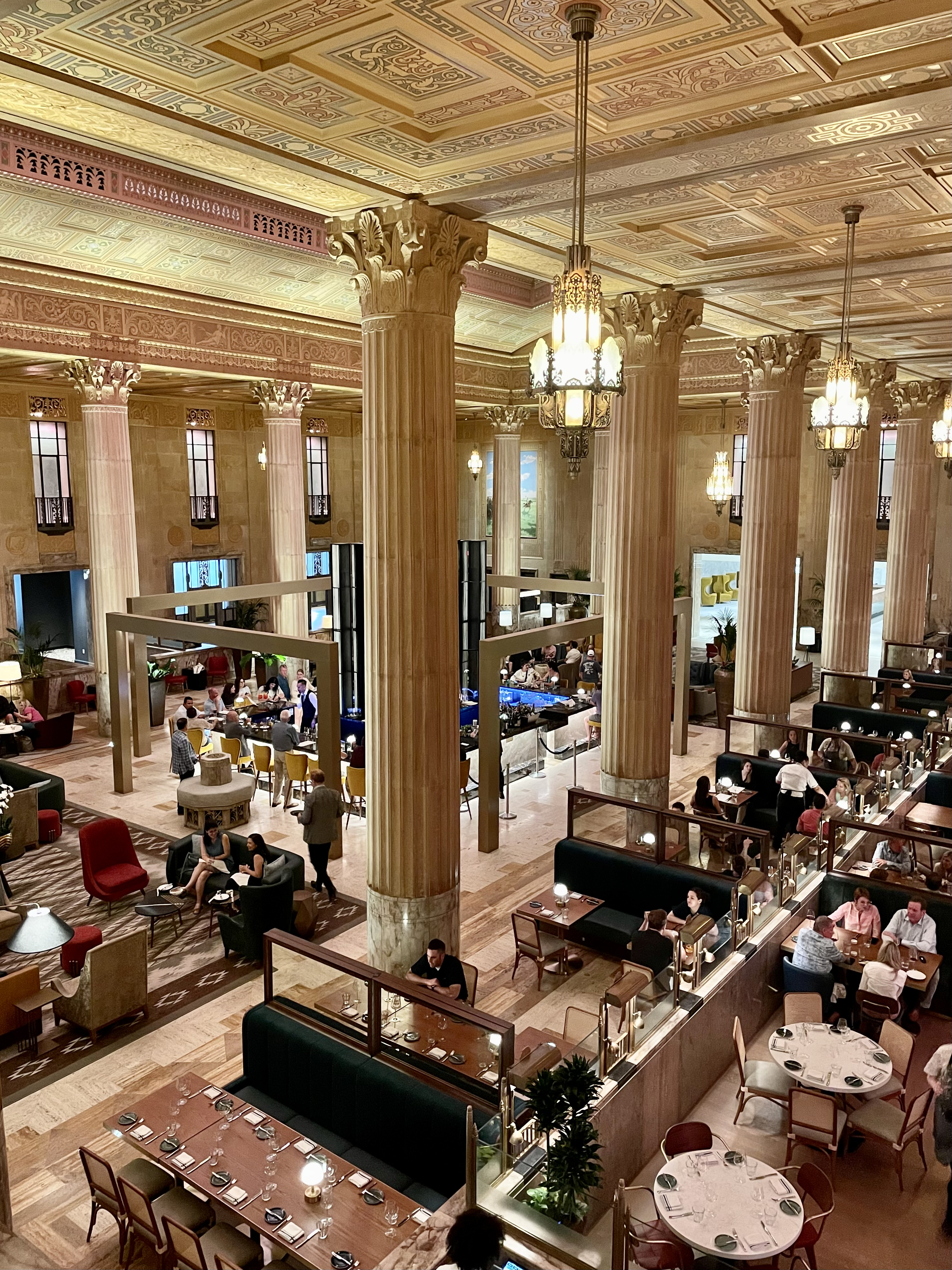
Overlooking the Great Hall

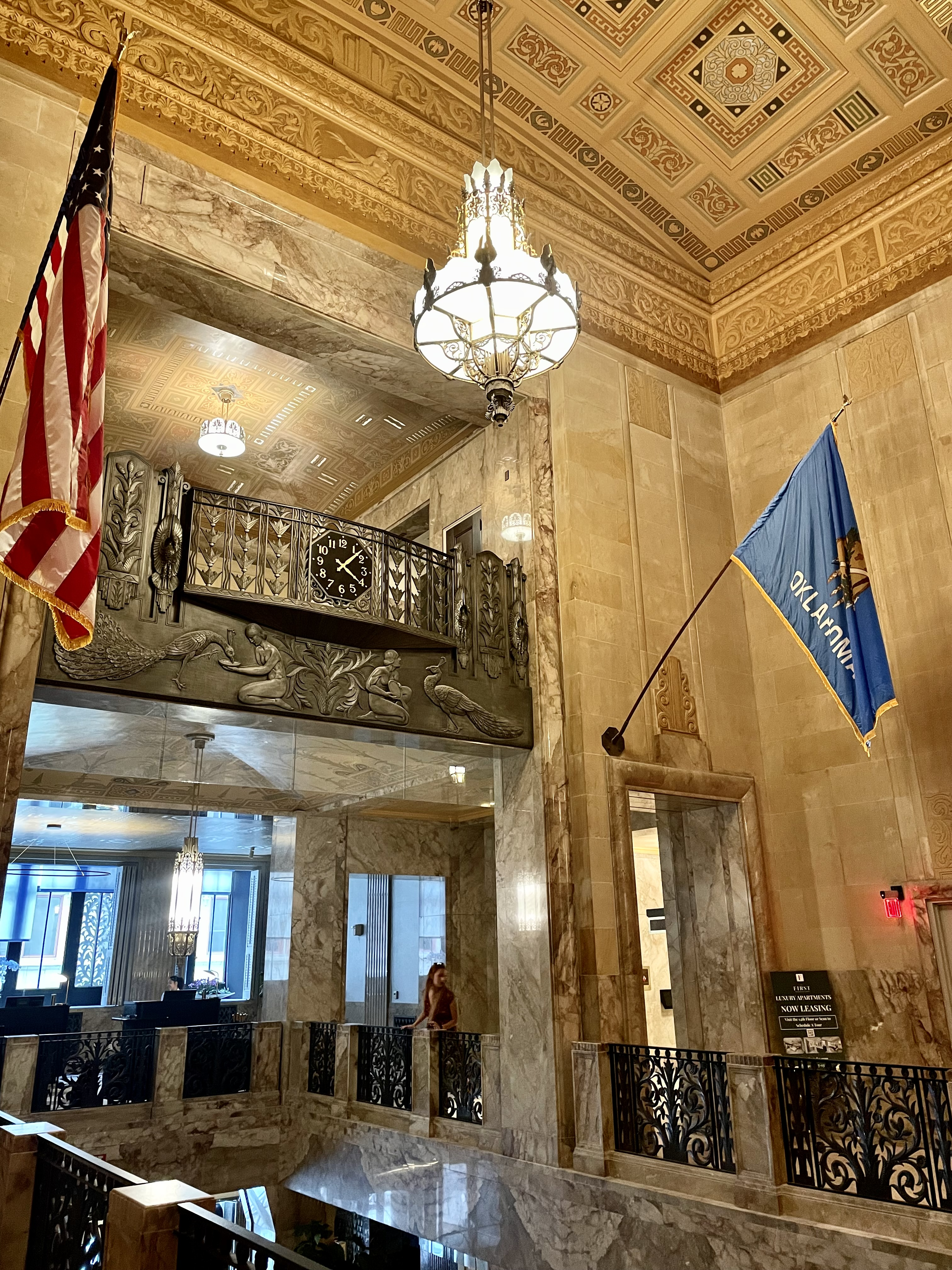
Looking towards the National Hotel registration from the Great Hall

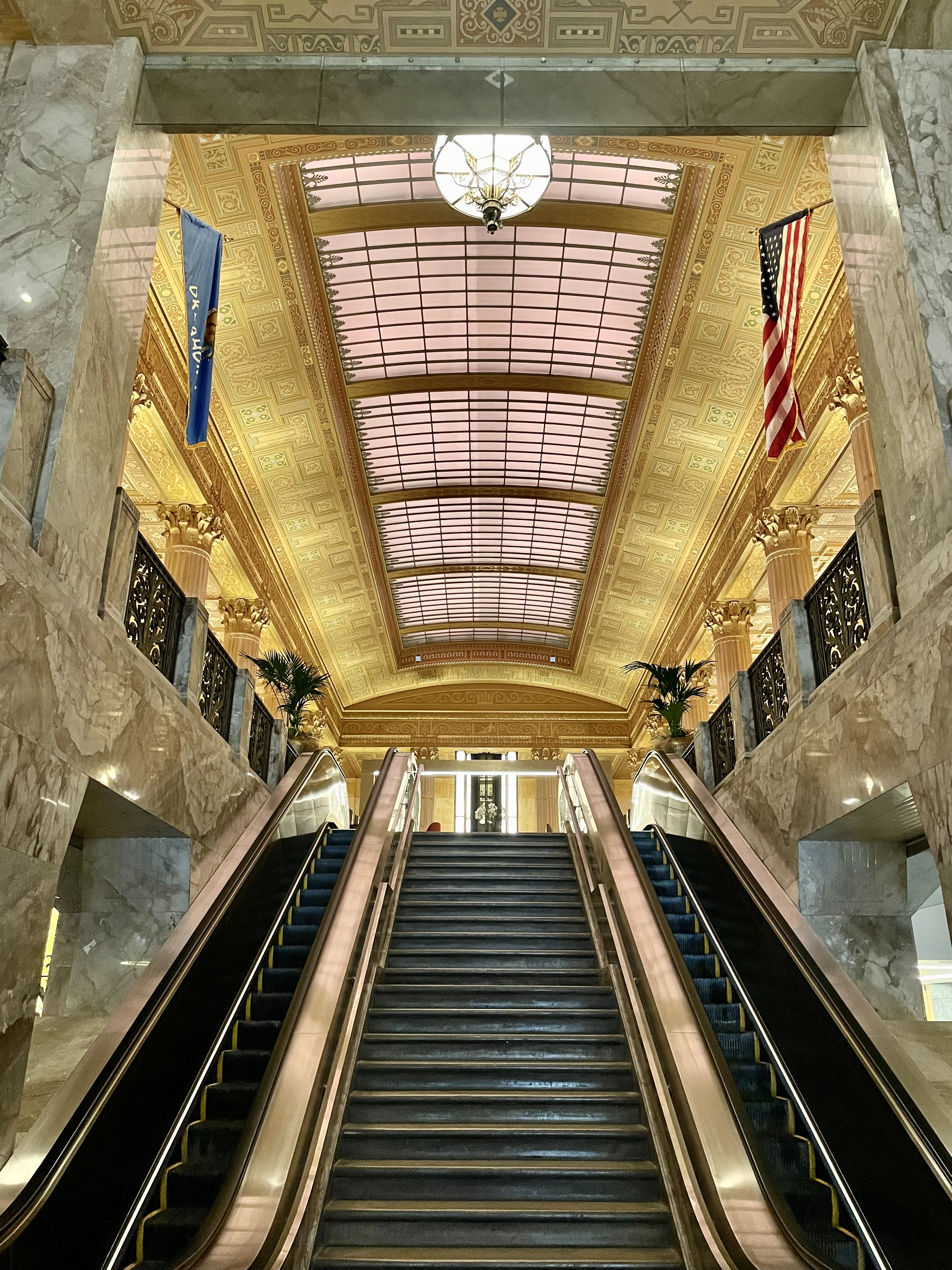
Looking up towards the Great Hall from the lobby

== See also ==
- List of tallest buildings in Oklahoma City
- List of tallest buildings in Oklahoma

Preceded by City Place	Tallest Buildings in Oklahoma City; 1931—1971; 136m	Succeeded by BancFirst Tower
