= Northwest Davenport Savings Bank =

- U.S. National Register of Historic Places
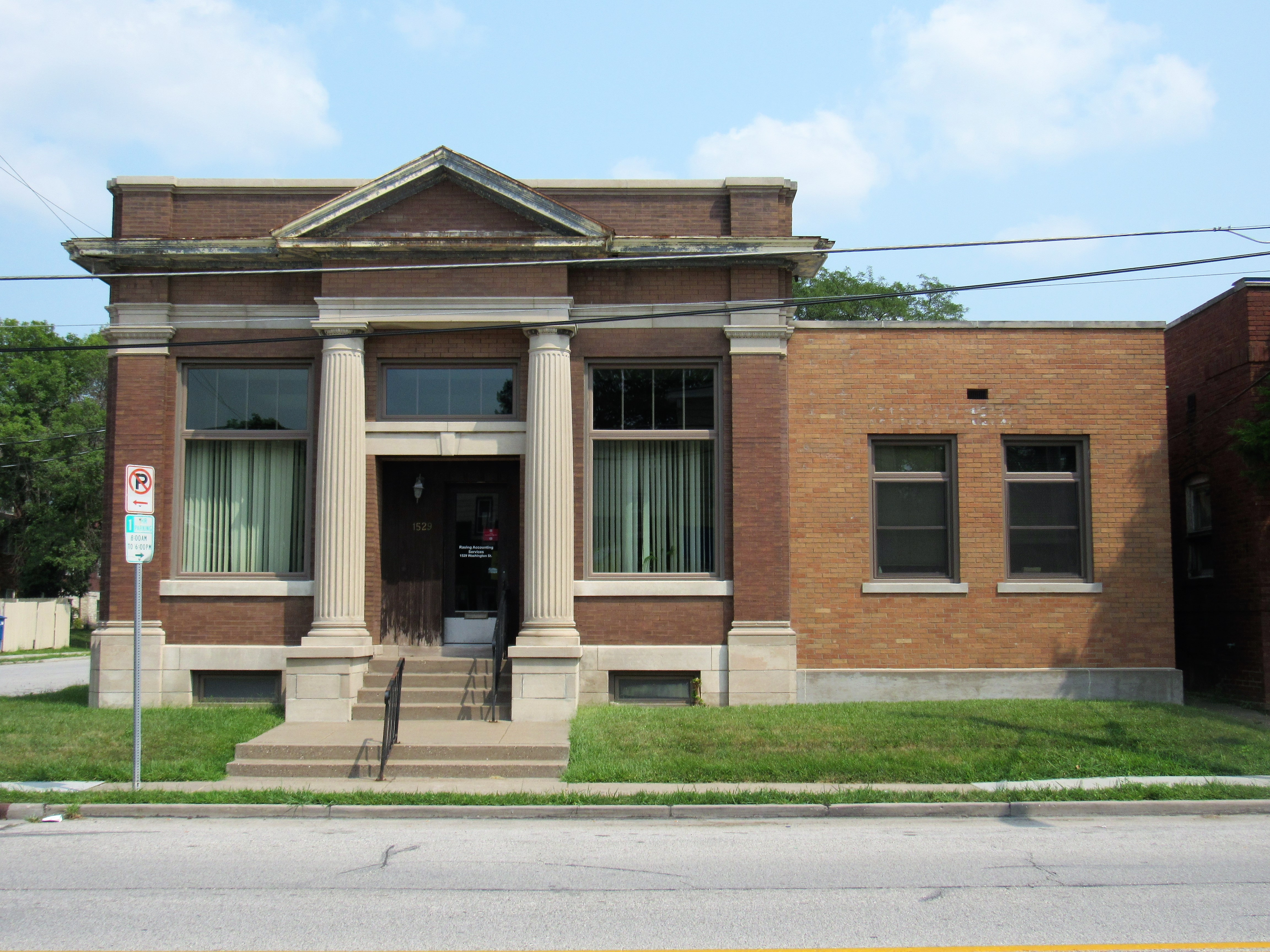

- Location within Iowa Location within the United States
- Location: 1529 Washington St. Davenport, Iowa
- Coordinates: 41°32′8″N 90°35′47″W
- Area: less than one acre
- Built: 1912
- Architect: Arthur Ebeling
- Architectural style: Classical Revival
- MPS: Davenport MRA
- NRHP reference No.: 84001491
- Added to NRHP: July 27, 1984

Northwest Davenport Savings Bank is a historic building located in a commercial district in the old northwest section of Davenport, Iowa, United States. It has been listed on the National Register of Historic Places since 1984.

== History ==
Northwest Davenport Savings Bank was established in Davenport around 1910. The Neoclassical style structure was designed by Davenport architect Arthur Ebeling. The building was completed in 1912 in a German-American neighborhood in what was then the northwest corner of the city of Davenport. Its founders were of German-American descent, and lived and operated businesses in the same commercial district. Dr. Jacob S. Weber, a physician, served as the banks first president; Peter Peters, a local merchant, was the first vice-president; and William Burmann was the cashier. It was one of five banks that were still active in the city when President Franklin Roosevelt declared the Bank Holiday in 1933. The others included: American Commercial and Savings Bank, Bechtel Trust Company, Union Savings Bank and Trust, and Home Savings Bank. Only two banks survived, American Commercial and Bechtel, but under new names.

On July 7, 1941, Northwest Bank and Trust Company began business in the building. They occupied the structure until 1953 when they moved to their current location on the corner of West Locust and Washington Streets.

== Architecture ==
The banking industry in Davenport enjoyed significant growth from around 1900 to 1915. The new buildings that were built by them in this era expressed this growth both downtown and in the newly established neighborhood branch banks. For the most part, they were built in some version of the Neoclassical style. This small bank building is a relatively simple single-story brick structure. It is built on a concrete block foundation. The building features engaged columns in the Doric order that support a full entablature and triangular pediment, and pilasters that are topped with egg-and-dart molding on the classically detailed caps. The main entrance has been partially filled in to create a smaller doorway. A small addition was also added to the south side of the building at a later date.
