= First National Bank and Trust Building (Lima, Ohio) =

- U.S. National Register of Historic Places
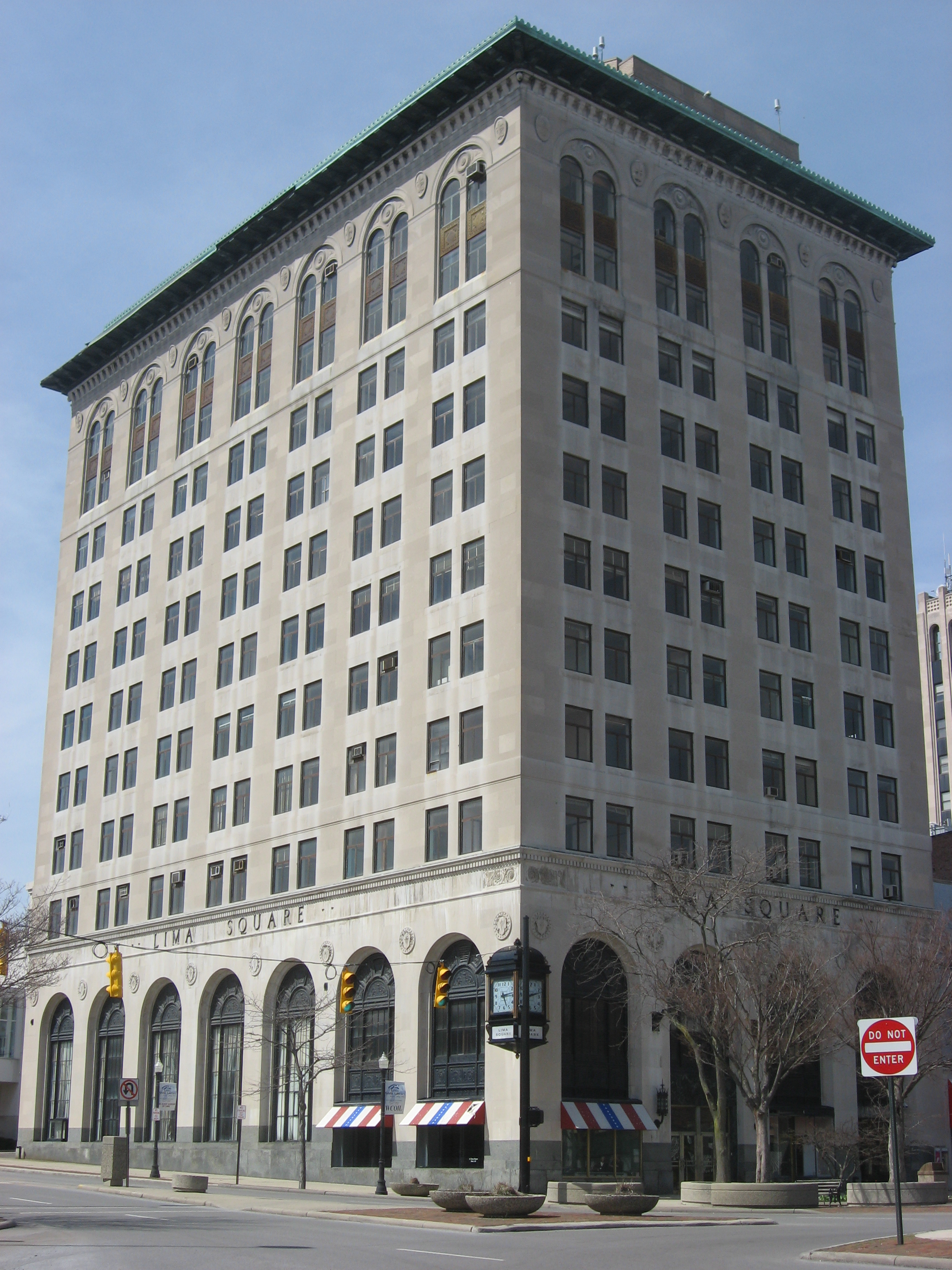
- Southern and eastern sides of the building

- Location within Ohio Location within the United States
- Location: 43-53 Public Sq., Lima, Ohio
- Coordinates: 40°44′24″N 84°6′20″W
- Area: Less than 1 acre (0.40 ha)
- Built: 1926
- Architect: Weary & Alford Company; W. H. Horster
- Architectural style: Chicago
- MPS: Lima MRA
- NRHP reference No.: 82001351
- Added to NRHP: October 7, 1982

The First National Bank and Trust Building is a historic building on Public Square in downtown Lima, Ohio, United States. The rectangular building, completed in 1926, was designed by Weary & Alford Company, an architectural firm from Chicago. It was the location of the offices of the First National Bank and Trust Company from 1926 until 1974, when the company became a part of Huntington Bank. The structure's twelve stories are faced with Indiana Limestone. Each column of windows is topped with an arch window on the highest floor, and the spandrels between the arch windows are connected to each other.

Founded as the "Lima Trust Company" in 1903, the First National Bank and Trust used a Masonic building in its earliest years. Starting in 1906, it operated in a smaller building (now destroyed), which served as its offices until it moved into its newly erected structure in 1926. During the early twentieth century, the influence of railroads and the oil industry caused Lima to be a very prosperous city. Many large buildings, including two skyscrapers, were built in the city's downtown; the majority of these new structures employed the Chicago Style of architecture. With the decline of the city's economy later in the century, the construction of large buildings in central Lima ceased — virtually all new construction took place in the city's outskirts or suburbs — thus making the First National Bank and Trust one of the newest major buildings in downtown Lima. In recognition of its historic significance, the First National Bank and Trust was listed on the National Register of Historic Places in 1982. It was one of seventeen Lima buildings that was added to the National Register as part of the "Lima Multiple Resource Area," a Multiple Property Submission that concentrated on architecturally significant buildings in or near downtown Lima.

Aside from its importance as a historic site, the First National Bank and Trust Building plays a leading part in local ornithology: the building is a nesting site for peregrine falcons and is part of the Midwest Peregrine Falcon Restoration Project.
