= Union Arcade =

- Union Savings Bank and Trust
- U.S. National Register of Historic Places
- U.S. Historic district – Contributing property
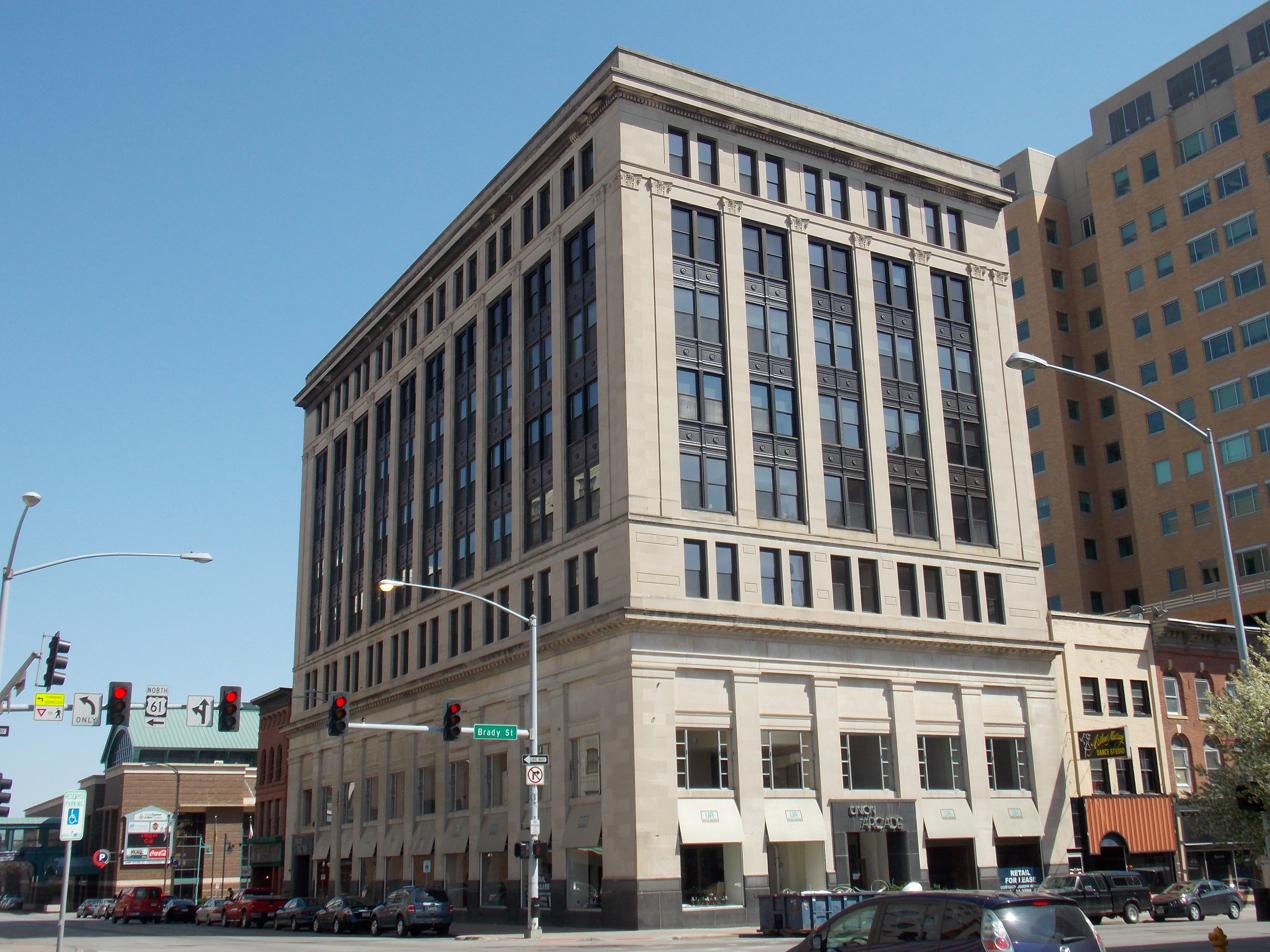

- Location within Iowa Location within the United States
- Location: 229 Brady St. Davenport, Iowa
- Coordinates: 41°31′20″N 90°34′25″W
- Area: less than one acre
- Built: 1915, 1924
- Built by: Hoggson Bros. (1924); Tunnicliff Construction Co. (1946)
- Architect: Temple & Burrows
- Architectural style: Classical Revival
- Part of: Davenport Downtown Commercial Historic District (ID100005546)
- MPS: Davenport MRA
- NRHP reference No.: 83002520
- Added to NRHP: July 07, 1983

The Union Arcade is an apartment building located in downtown Davenport, Iowa, United States. The building was individually listed on the National Register of Historic Places in 1983 by its original name Union Savings Bank and Trust. Originally, the building was built to house a bank and other professional offices. Although it was not the city's largest bank, and it was not in existence all that long, the building is still associated with Davenport's financial prosperity between 1900 and 1930. From 2014 to 2015 the building was renovated into apartments and it is now known as Union Arcade Apartments. In 2020 it was included as a contributing property in the Davenport Downtown Commercial Historic District.

== History ==
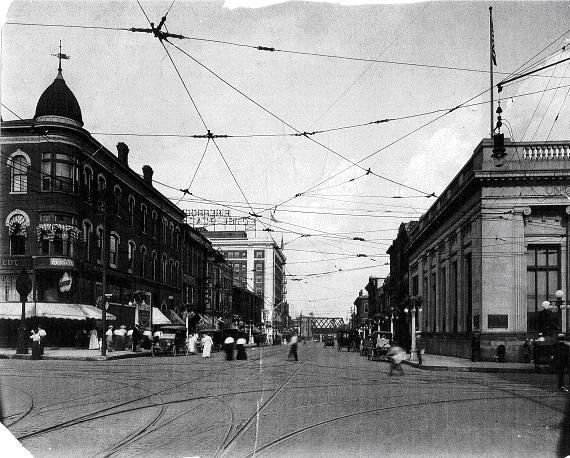
Third Street looking east. The lower level of the Union Savings Bank is shown at right before the upper floors were added.

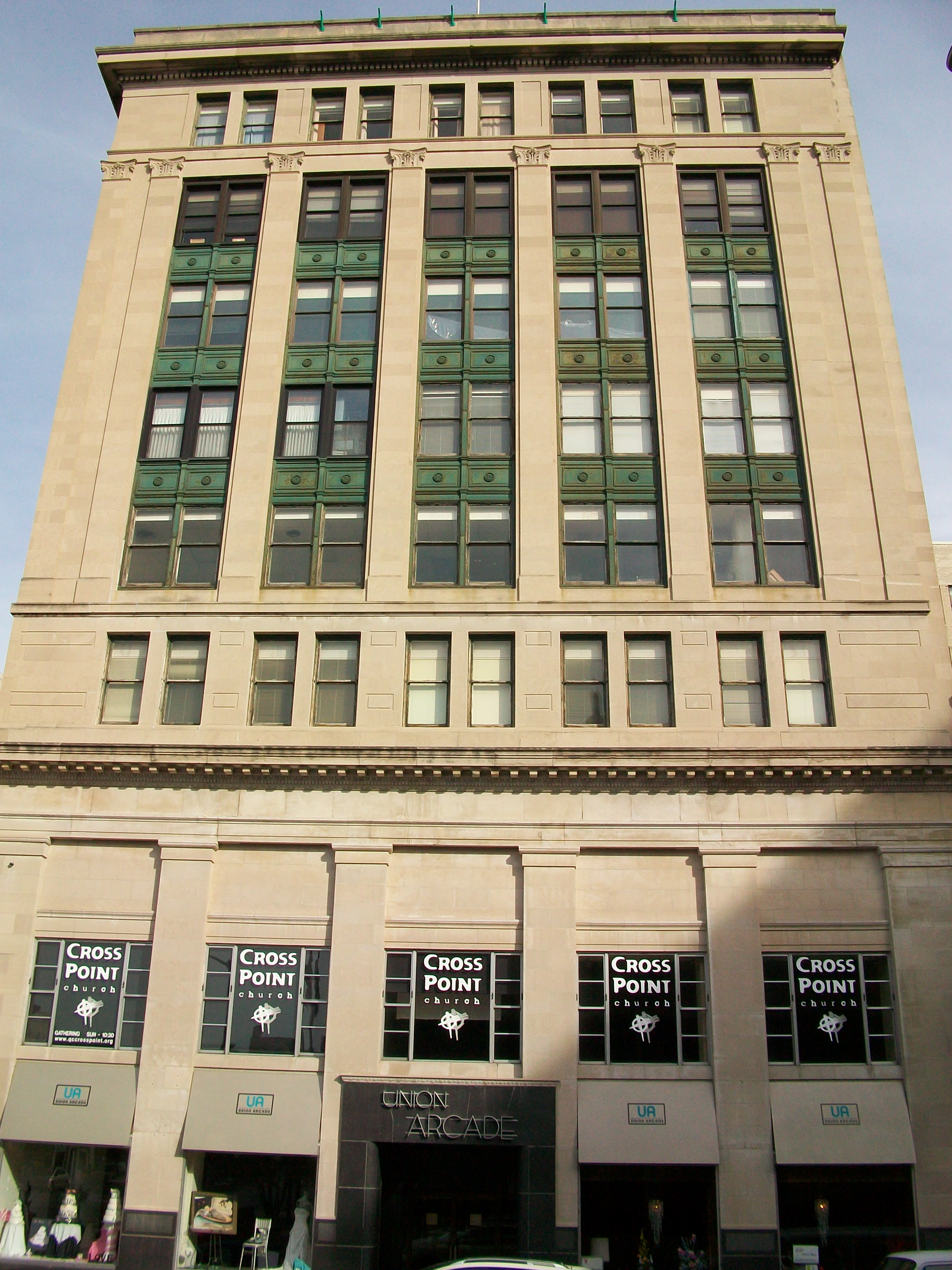
Brady Street facade

Union Savings Bank was established in Davenport in 1891. The bank moved to its Brady Street location around the turn of the 20th century It had previously been the location of Davenport National Bank until Union Savings Bank took it over. The lower level of the present building was completed around 1915 and the upper floors of the building were completed in 1924 for $820,000 according to the designs by the Davenport architectural firm Temple & Burrows. Hoggson Brothers, a New York bank construction company, was the general contractor in 1924.

As the bank grew it started to acquire other banks in the city. In the 1920s it merged with Davenport Savings Bank and Scott County Savings Bank and was renamed Union Savings Bank and Trust Company. After the start of the Great Depression many banks failed or were severely weakened. One of those banks was First National Bank, which Union Savings Bank and Trust took over before the Bank Holiday in 1933. The other Davenport banks who survived up to this time included: American Commercial and Savings Bank, Bechtel Trust Company, Northwest Davenport Savings Bank, and Home Savings Bank. The bank, however, was not one of the banks to emerge after the Bank Holiday. In 1946 a $75,000 renovation of the former banking hall created two floors of retail stores, which was when the building was renamed the Union Arcade. Davenport architectural firm Kruse & Parish designed the renovation and Tunnicliff Construction Company was the general contractor. Professional offices occupied the upper floors.

Rodney Blackwell of Financial District Properties bought the Union Arcade in late 2013 for $1.65 million. In March 2014 a renovation project began to turn the building into 68 market-rate apartments with commercial space on the main level. The $16.65 million project was completed in May 2015. Three of the apartments are lofts and the rest are studios and one- and two-bedroom units. The mezzanine was converted into a resident lounge and a laundry room. The building's original marble floors were retained in the common areas, and the mail chute and historic doors were left in place for appearances.

== Architecture ==
The building is a seven-story, L-shaped structure designed in the Neoclassical and the emerging Chicago Commercial Style. It is 125 feet (38 m) tall. The main façade of the building fronted Brady Street, with its secondary façade on East Third Street. It is built of limestone and it has a limestone foundation. The Neoclassical details are found primarily on the street level façade, which was the part of the building constructed around 1915. When it was built it had columns in the Ionic order at the street level side on Brady Street. On the north side, the columns become pilasters featuring the Corinthian order.

The upper floors were constructed nine years after the lower level of the building. It is here that the Chicago Commercial Style is in evidence. The windows are stacked in pairs between the vertical piers and are themselves separated by decorative metal spandrel panels. The top of the building features a heavy cornice.

Kruse & Parish was the architectural firm that remodeled the building's storefront to function as the Union Arcade. It is probably at that time that the Ionic columns were removed from the building. The mezzanine level, which provides a transition to the upper levels, was also added at that time.
