= First National Bank Building (Davenport, Iowa) =

- U.S. National Register of Historic Places
- U.S. Historic district – Contributing property
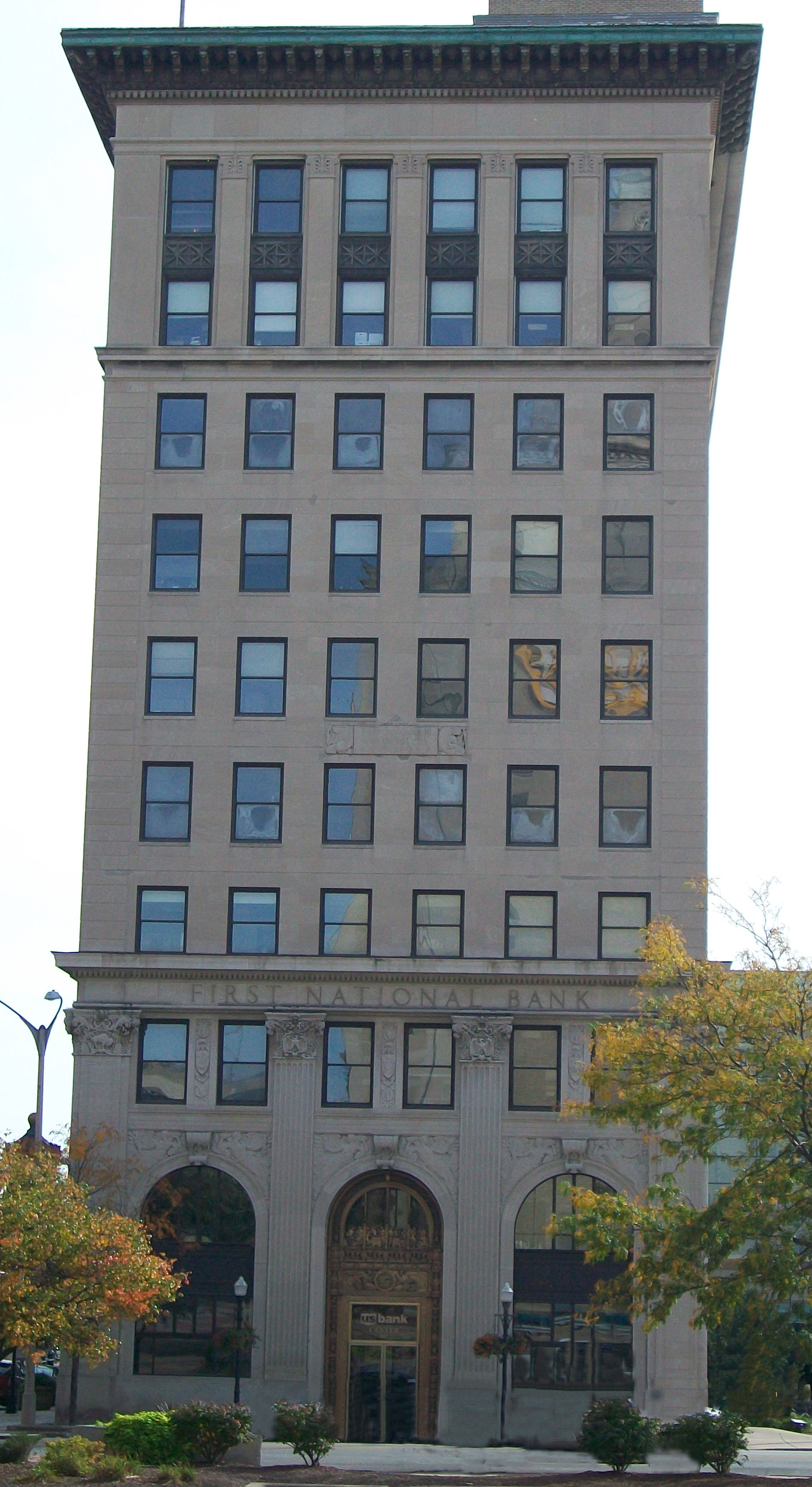

- Location within Iowa Location within the United States
- Location: 201 W. 2nd St. Davenport, Iowa
- Coordinates: 41°31′16″N 90°34′32″W
- Area: less than one acre
- Built: 1924
- Built by: John Soller & Son
- Architect: O.H. Breidert of Childs & Smith
- Architectural style: Renaissance Revival
- Part of: Davenport Downtown Commercial Historic District (ID100005546)
- MPS: Davenport MRA
- NRHP reference No.: 83002430
- Added to NRHP: July 7, 1983

The First National Bank Building is a historic building located in downtown Davenport, Iowa, United States. It was individually listed on the National Register of Historic Places in 1983. In 2020 it was included as a contributing property in the Davenport Downtown Commercial Historic District. The building is now known as the US Bank Building, its main tenant.

== History ==
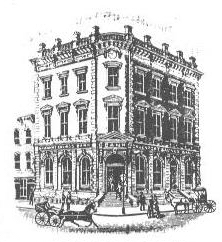
The original First National Bank

After the National Banking and Currency Act was passed by Congress and signed into law in 1863, First National Bank in Davenport was the first bank in the country to open under its provisions. The bank was headed by Austin Corbin, who had previously been a partner in Macklot and Corbin in Davenport. A $12.60 check written by Henry Hess was the first check in the country to clear the new banking system. The bank suffered some financial difficulties in the 1870s and was re-chartered in 1882. In the 1920s First National Bank merged with Iowa National Bank and maintained the name of the former. After the Bank Holiday in 1933, Union Savings Bank and Trust assumed control of First National Bank. The upper floors of the building remained occupied after the bank's failure, but the main banking room was not occupied by another bank again until the late 20th century. In the meantime, the main floor had been used for retail. Tenants on the upper floors are mainly professionals such as dentists, medical doctors, attorneys, and insurance agents.

== Architecture ==
The First National Bank Building is the third building on the same site for the bank. It replaced a building that was destroyed by a fire. The building was designed by Chicago architect O.H. Breidert with the firm Childs & Smith in the Renaissance Revival style. It rises 144 feet (44 m) above the ground and includes nine floors with a steel frame and brick construction. The structure is built on a concrete foundation and is faced with stone. Its form is restrained, but the decoration on the lower level of the building is not. The stylistic details evoke the Renaissance Revival style and combines classical precedents with forms that are associated with the sixteenth century Italian Renaissance. These stylistic elements are combined with the technological advances of the Chicago School.

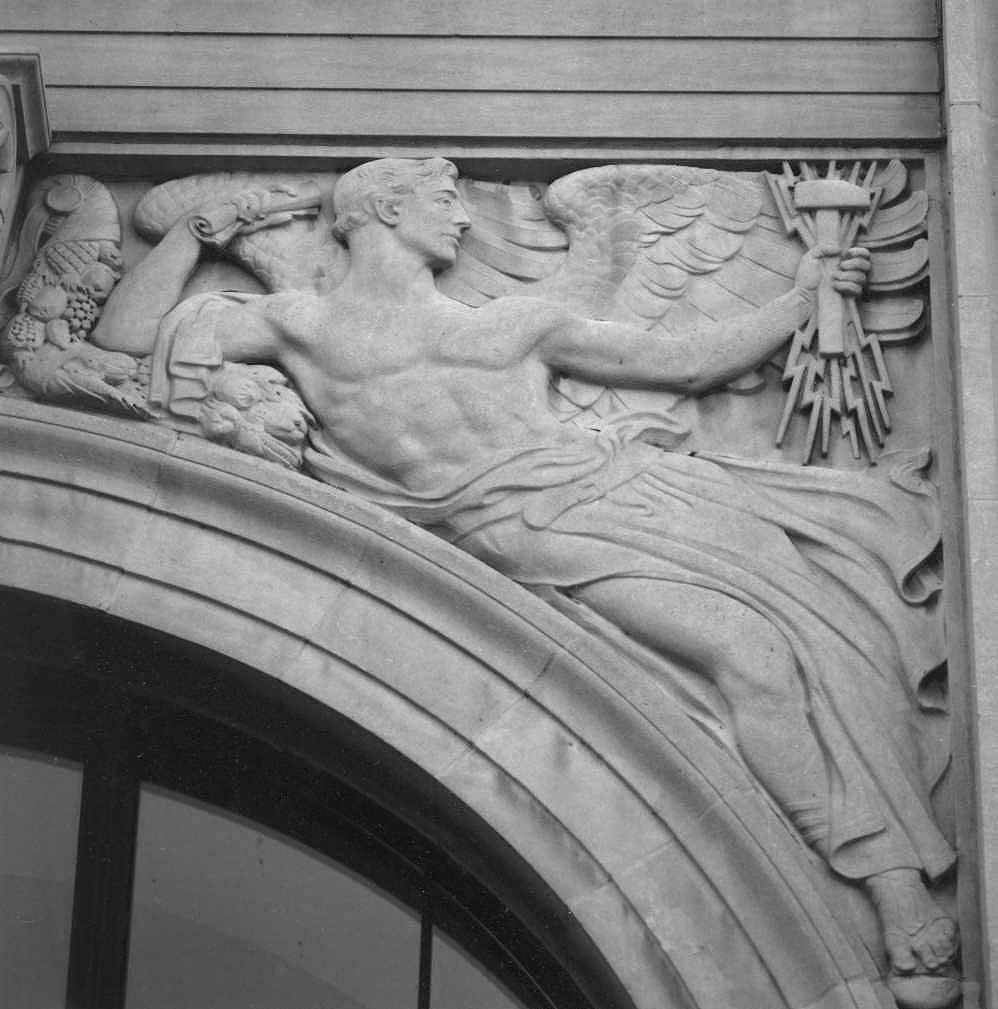
Spandrel figure above main entrance by Adolph A. Weinman

The building can be divided into three sections: a two-story base; five floors of offices; and a two-story section at the top that terminates in a bracketed cornice. The lower level of the building is a tall arcade of round arches and pilasters with detailed capitals. The capitals feature carvings of eagles and buffalo among floral motifs. The main entrance on Second Street is in a recessed rounded arch in the center of the building. An ornate bronze screen above the doors is covered with urns, floral designs and Grecian or Roman figures. Four scenes span the top of the frieze. The first depicts men mining metal, the second depicts the metal being stamped into coins, the third depicts the weighing and counting of the coins, and the fourth depicts trade. The bronze work was created by John Polachek Bronze & Iron Company, who had a close association with Louis Comfort Tiffany as well as other prominent artists and architects in the early 20th century.

Above the doorway arch are two reclining figures by Adolph A. Weinman, who was also responsible for the pediment over the Jefferson Memorial entrance in Washington, D.C., and the frieze in the courtroom of the U.S. Supreme Court. Carved figures by Corrado Parducci occupy the inside of the archway. The figures on the left depict labor, agriculture, industry, and commerce and on the right are depictions of law, philosophy, security, and banking. An inscription above the third floor of the building notes that the building housed the first National bank in the United States.

A clock originally mounted on the Scott County Savings Bank building was placed on the northeast corner of the building in 1994. The clock was made of copper in 1918 and weighs 600 pounds (270 kg). An awning was built on the west side of the building to cover the lanes of the motor banking facilities and ATMs. The first-floor interior has been modified from its original appearance and it retains little of historic importance.

The five floors of office space that make up the second section provide a contrast with the base of the building and except for the quoins, are unadorned. The windows in this section are set close to the exterior wall plane. A narrow cornice divides the second and third sections. Its two-story pilasters emphasize the structure's vertical thrust, but the dark, recessed spandrels counteract the effect. The building culminates in a wide, bracketed, overhanging cornice.

The building was one of five 1920s-era structures voted as the 50 Most Significant Iowa Buildings of the 20th Century by the Iowa Chapter of the American Institute of Architects.

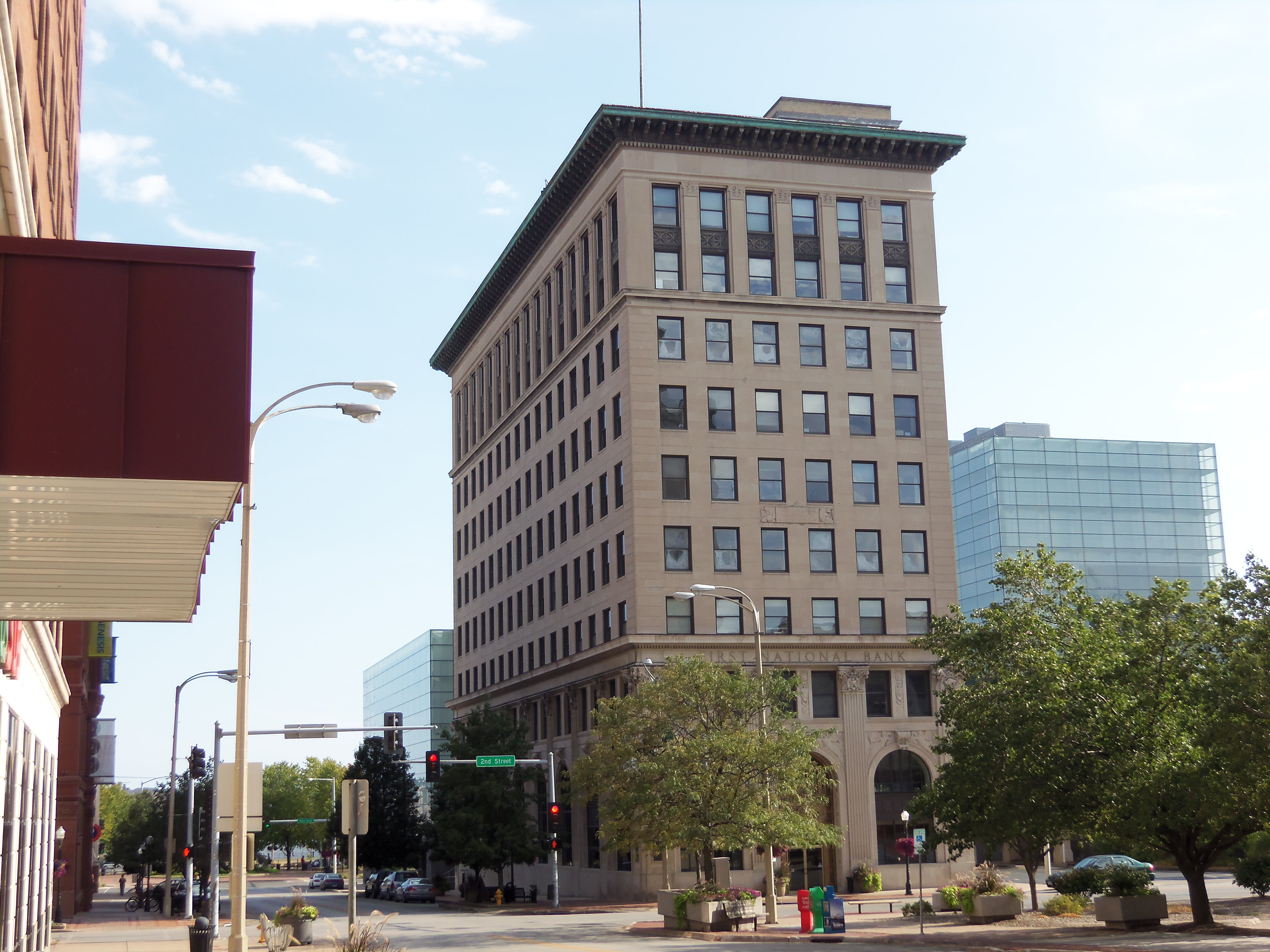
The building in its setting

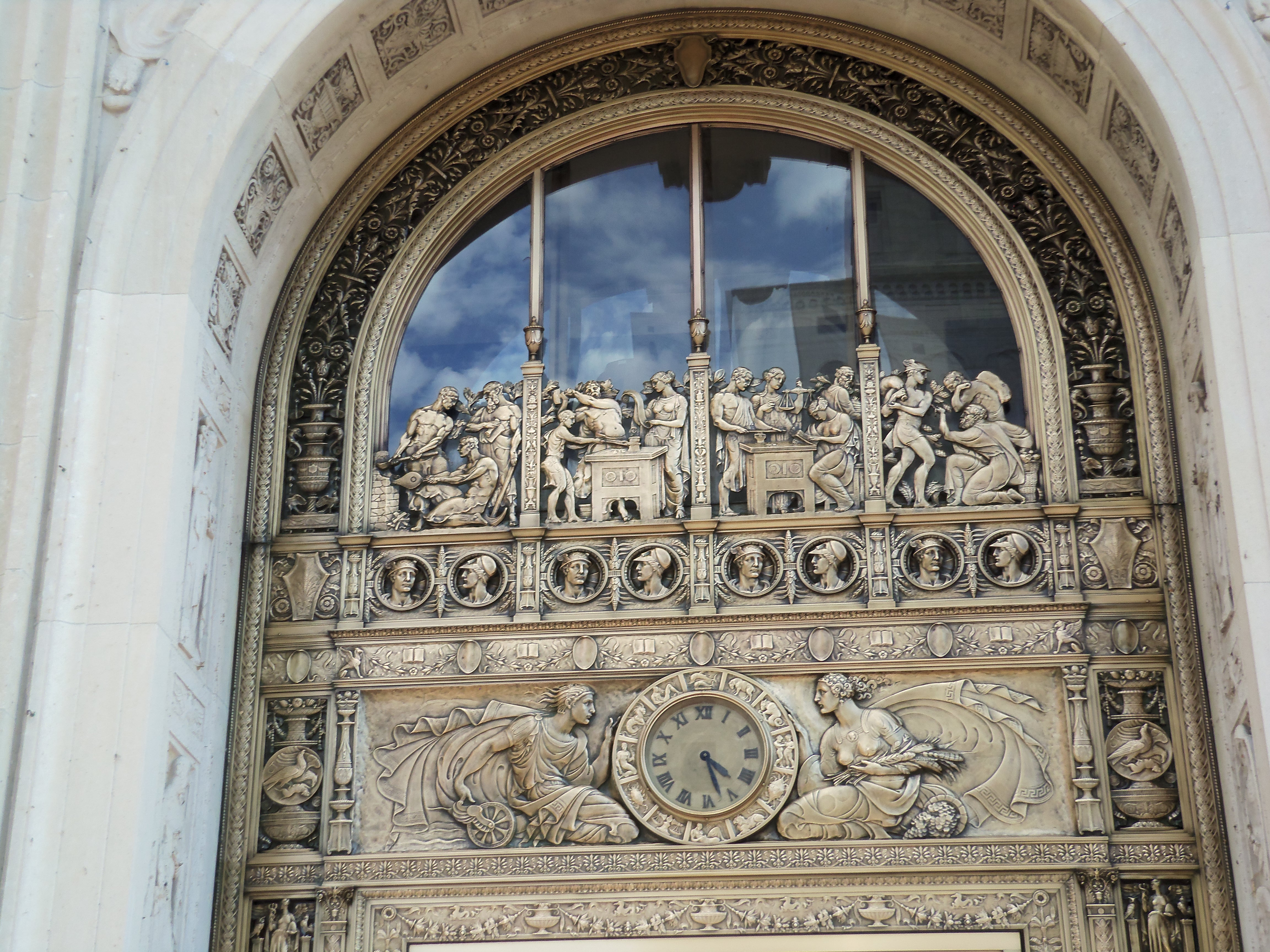
The bronze frieze over the main entrance.

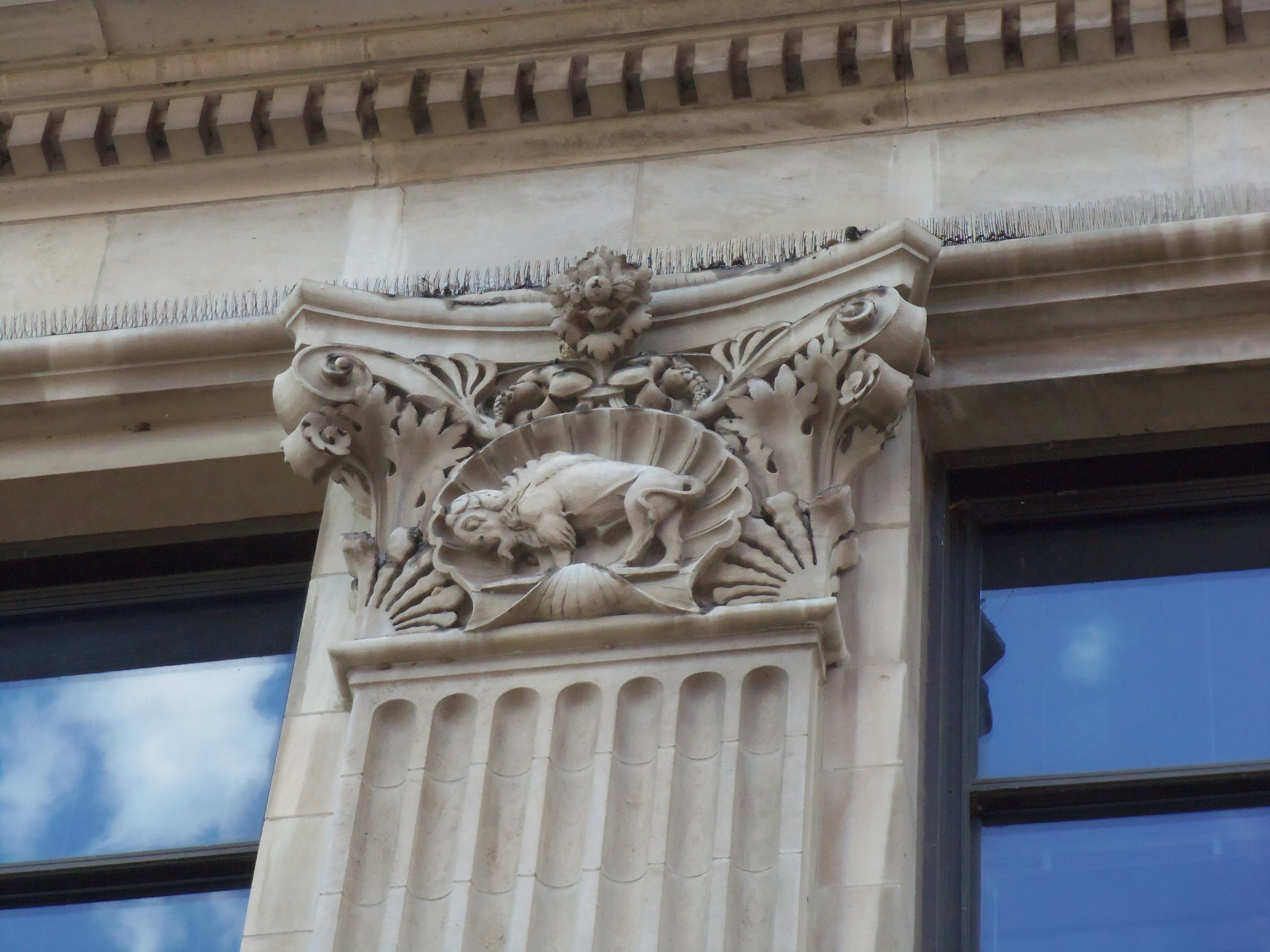
Buffalo Capital

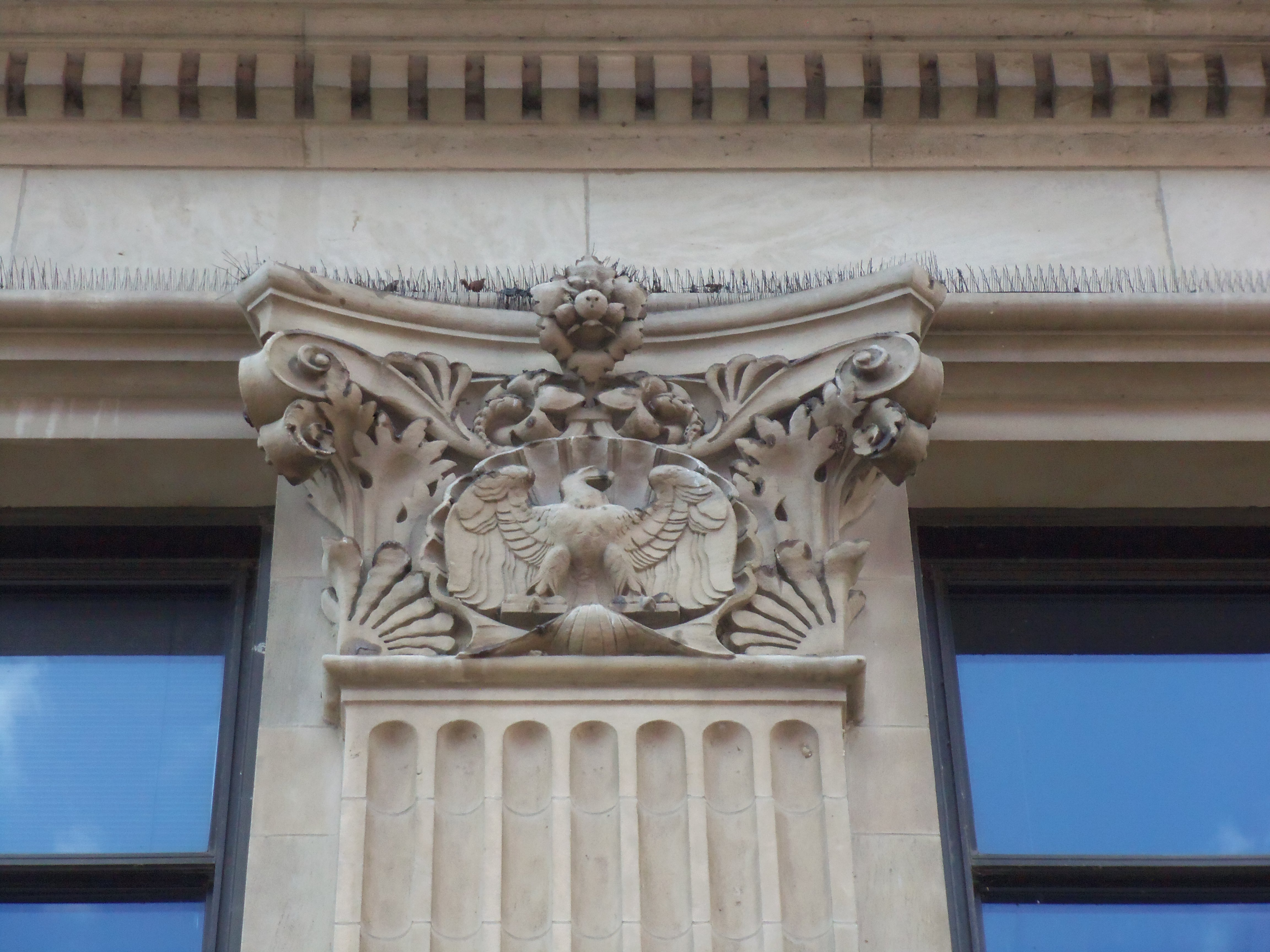
Eagle Capital

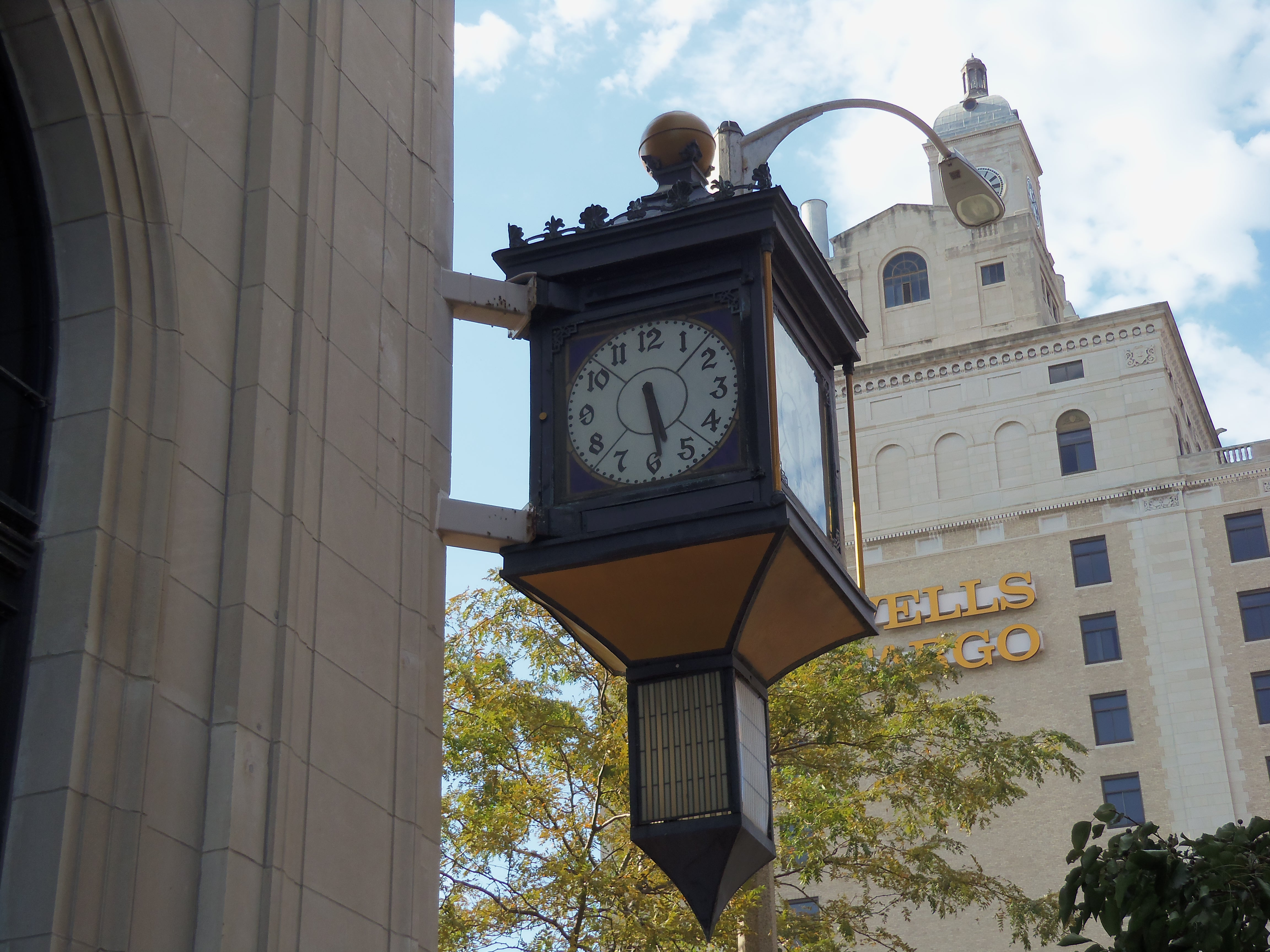
Clock
