= Sioux Falls National Bank =

Historic place in South Dakota, United States

- Sioux Falls National Bank Building
- U.S. National Register of Historic Places
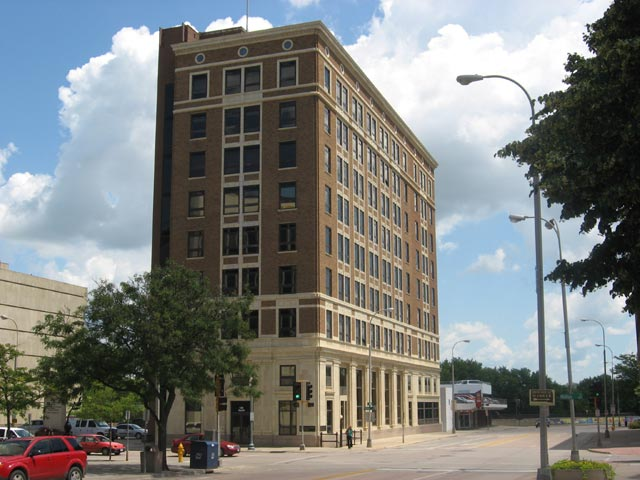
- Building in 2009

- Location within South Dakota Location within the United States
- Location: 100 N. Phillips Ave., Sioux Falls, South Dakota
- Coordinates: 43°32′51″N 96°43′35″W
- Area: 0.2 acres (0.081 ha)
- Built: 1917
- Built by: Pike & Cook
- Architect: Weary & Alford
- Architectural style: Late 19th and Early 20th Century American Movements, Sullivanesque
- NRHP reference No.: 79002406
- Added to NRHP: March 26, 1979

The Hotel on Phillips is a hotel at 100 N. Phillips Ave. in Sioux Falls, South Dakota. It is located in the former Sioux Falls National Bank building, a skyscraper built in 1917, during World War I. The building was listed on the National Register of Historic Places in 1979 as "Sioux Falls National Bank Building". The property has also been known as the 100 North Phillips Building.

It was the tallest building in the state of South Dakota when it was built, and remained the tallest when it was listed on the National Register. (In 2019, the tallest is the CenturyLink Tower, also in Sioux Falls, built in 1986.)

It has been termed Sullivanesque. It was designed by architects Weary & Alford of Chicago. It was built by builders Pike & Cook of Minneapolis.

The hotel has been included by the National Trust for Historic Preservation in its Historic Hotels of America program since 2019.

According to the Historic Hotels of America program, "The lead architect for the project was Oscar Wentworth [sic, apparently meaning Oscar Wenderoth], a former director of the Office of the Supervising Architect of the United States Government. With help from the contracting company Pike & Cook, Wentworth spent the next year developing the nine-story skyscraper with designs inspired by the architectural aesthetics of the visionary John Sullivan. The building today stands as the only remaining example of this unique brand of architecture—known as Sulluvanesque—in all of Sioux Falls."
