= Davenport Bank and Trust =

Historic bank in Iowa, United States

- U.S. National Register of Historic Places
- U.S. Historic district – Contributing property
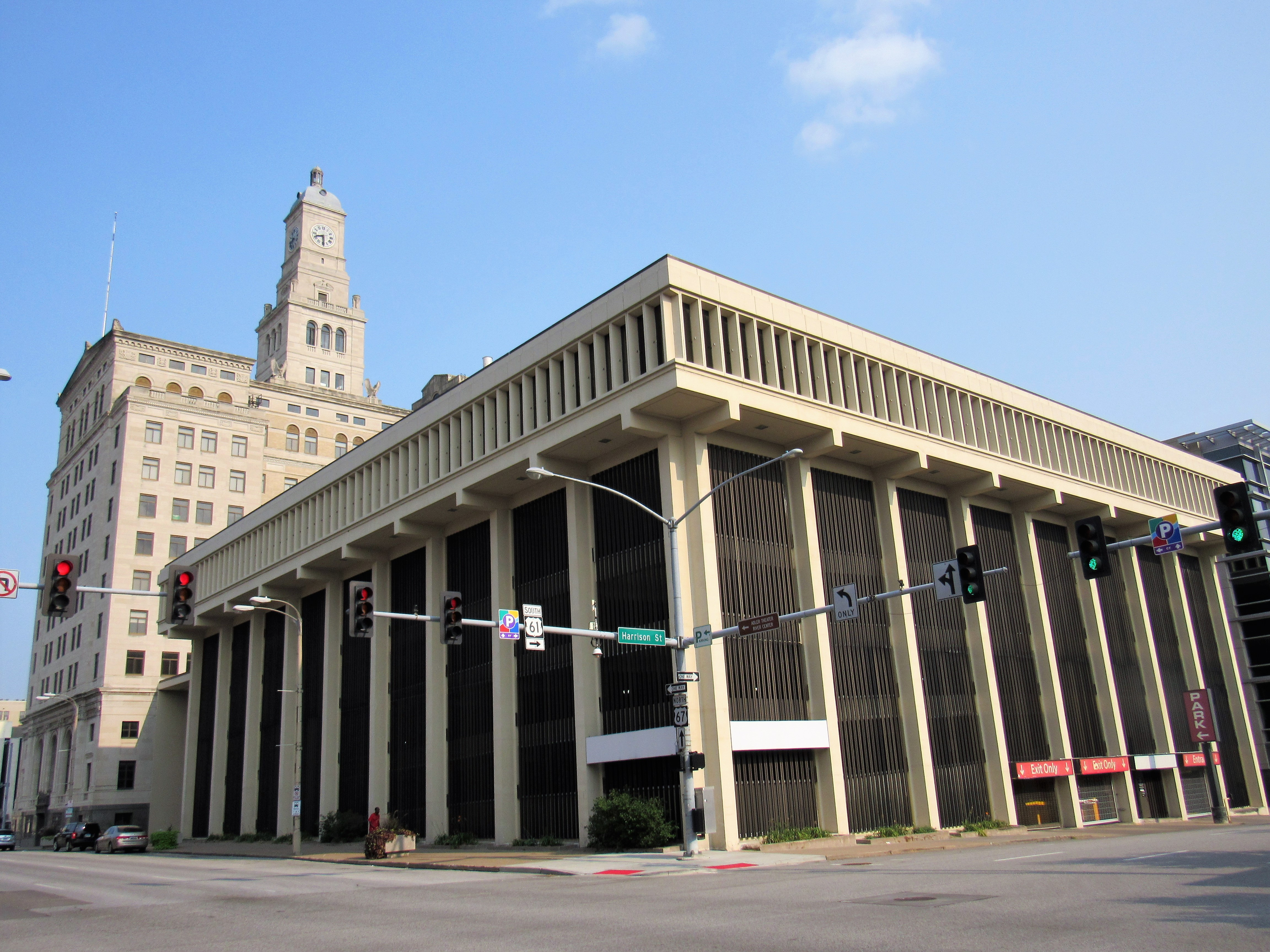

- Location within Iowa Location within the United States
- Location: 201-209 W. 3rd St. Davenport, Iowa
- Coordinates: 41°31′20″N 90°34′33″W
- Area: 1.1 acres (0.45 ha)
- Built: 1927, 1971
- Architect: Weary & Alford Company; Richard C. Rich & Associates
- Architectural style: Classical Revival; Modern Movement
- Part of: Davenport Downtown Commercial Historic District (ID100005546)
- MPS: Davenport MRA
- NRHP reference No.: 83002395 (original); 16000249 (increase)

Significant dates
- Added to NRHP: July 7, 1983
- Boundary increase: May 12, 2016

Davenport Bank and Trust Company was the leading bank of the Quad Cities metropolitan area for much of the 20th century and for the surrounding region of eastern Iowa and western Illinois. It was once Iowa's largest commercial bank, and the headquarters building has dominated the city's skyline since it was constructed in 1927 at the corner of Third and Main Streets in downtown Davenport, Iowa. It was acquired by Norwest Bank of Minneapolis in 1993 and operated as a Wells Fargo location following the 1998 merger of the two financial institutions.

The historic building was listed on the National Register of Historic Places in 1983 under the name of its predecessor financial institution American Commercial and Savings Bank. In 2016 the National Register approved a boundary increase with the Davenport Bank and Trust name. It was included as a contributing property in the Davenport Downtown Commercial Historic District in 2020. It remains the tallest building in the Quad Cities, and is today known as Davenport Bank Apartments as it has been redeveloped into a mixed-use facility housing commercial, office, and residential space.

== History ==
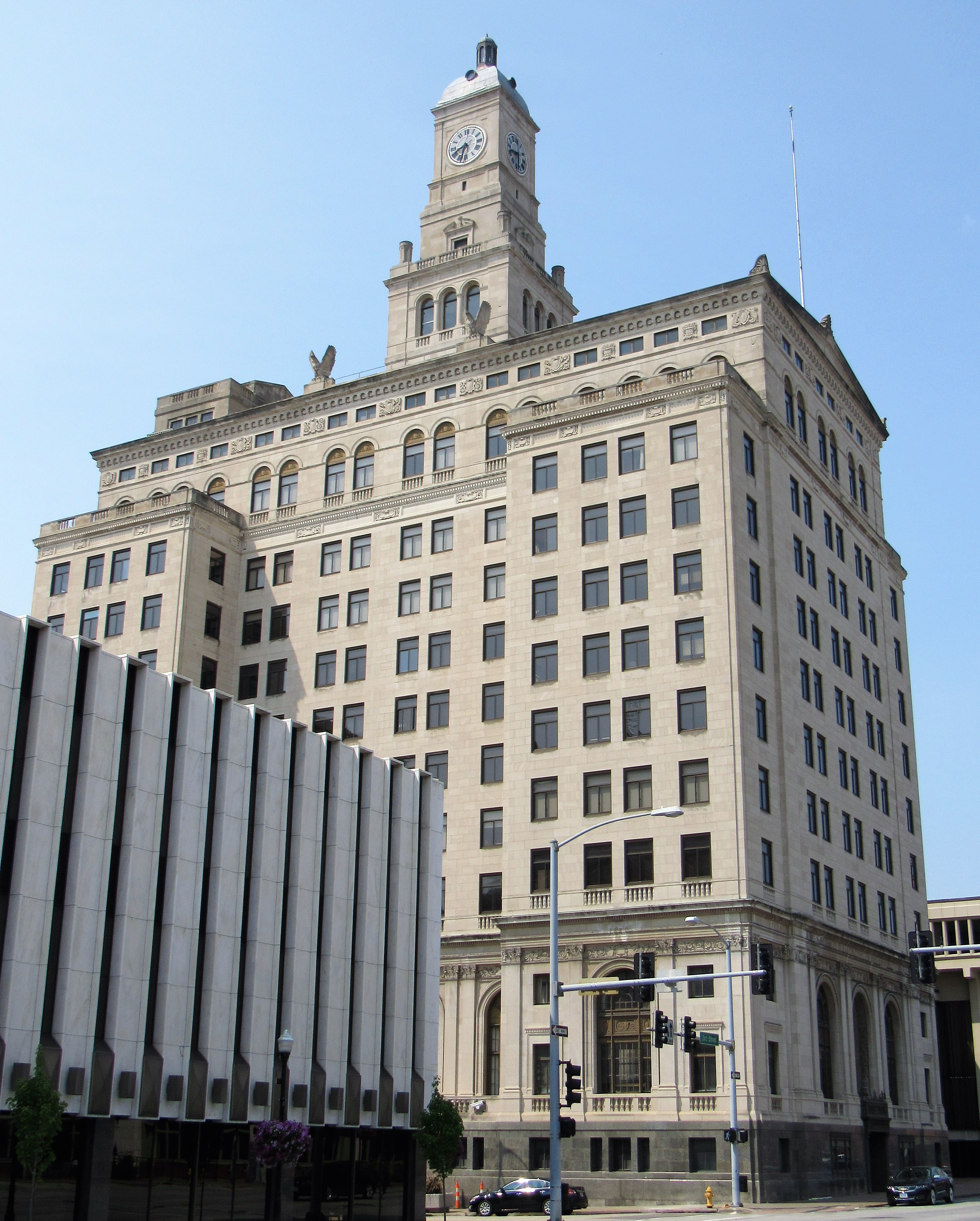
1927 bank building

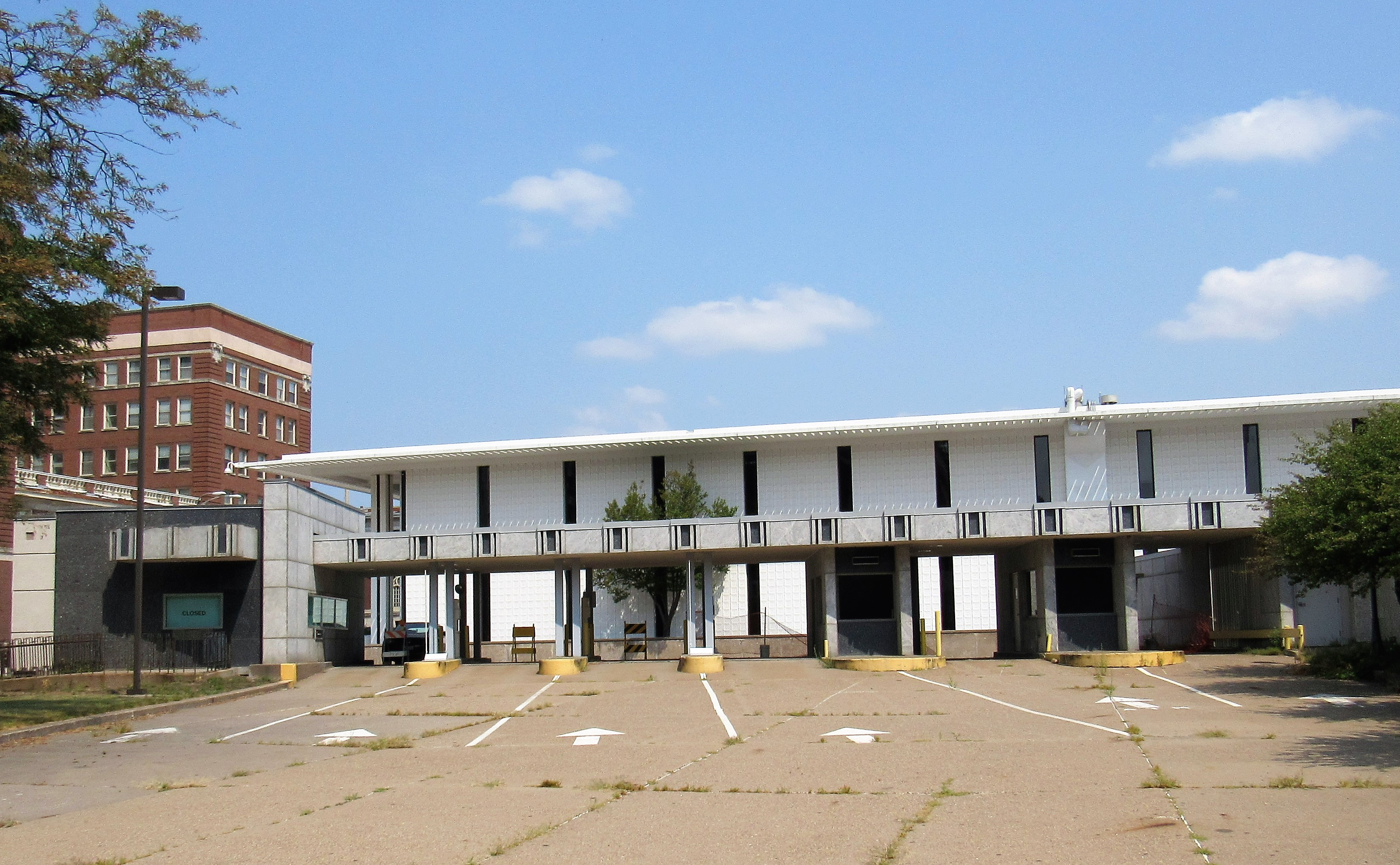
1966 auto bank

Henry Lischer and H.H. Anderson formed German Savings Bank in 1869. Davenport had a large German community and it contributed to the bank's success. By the 1890s the city had become the financial center of the region and the state. German Savings Bank took over Citizens National Bank in 1906, and it merged with the Farmers and Mechanics Savings Bank in 1910. By 1916 it was the largest bank in Iowa. Because of anti-German sentiments that resulted from World War I the bank's name was changed in 1918 to American Commercial and Savings Bank.

As the 1920s began, Davenport had 11 banks. American Commercial and Savings Bank absorbed the Security Savings Bank at this time. They had this building constructed in 1927. The new building reflected the significance of the bank in the community, and it has dominated the city's skyline since it was built. As a result of the Great Depression, it absorbed Iowa National Bank, the Citizens Trust and Savings Bank, and the Farmers and Merchants Bank and was one of five banks in the city that was still active when President Franklin Roosevelt signed the Emergency Banking Act in 1933. The others included: Bechtel Trust Company, Northwest Davenport Savings Bank, Union Savings Bank and Trust, and Home Savings Bank. It was one of only two banks to re-open in Davenport. The bank changed its name at this time to Davenport Bank and Trust Company under the direction of E.P. Adler. By 1936, it rebuilt itself to become the second largest bank in Iowa.

V.O. Figge became associated with the bank in 1931 as a bank examiner and served as vice-president, president and CEO into the 1990s. The bank's assets were at $1.5 million the year this building was completed and they grew to $100 million by 1960, once again making this the state's largest bank. In 1966, Davenport Bank built a Modern Movement drive-in banking facility on its surface parking lot at the northeast corner of Third and Main Streets. To replace the surface lot, a modern parking structure and additional space for the bank were built adjacent to the west side of the building in 1971.

Davenport Bank & Trust was sold to Norwest Bank of Minneapolis in 1993 and became part of Wells Fargo following the merger of the two large banks in November 1998. In 2005 the building was purchased by Financial District Properties. A $7.5 million renovation project in 2013 converted the building's fifth, ninth, tenth and eleventh floors into 29 market rate apartments. Wells Fargo Bank remained alongside other commercial and residential tenants until the weekend of April 23–24, 2016 when it moved its operations to the redeveloped Putnam-Parker Block. The building was renamed Davenport Bank Apartments.

== Architecture ==
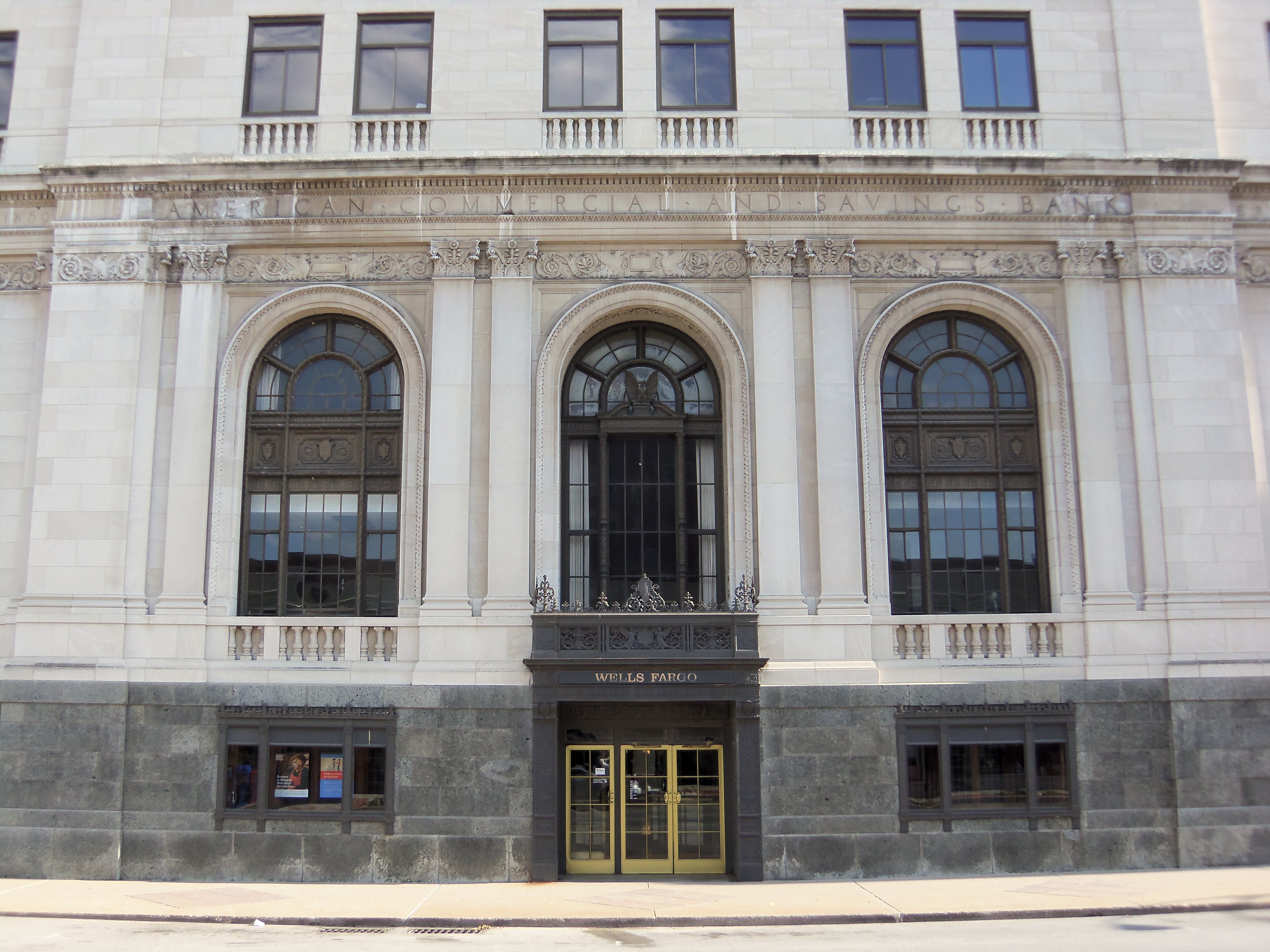
Third Street entrance

The main bank building was designed by the Chicago architectural firm of Weary & Alford. It was built by Walsh-Kahl Construction Company from 1926 to 1927. The main building is twelve stories with a steel frame faced with limestone. Bowers and Svendsen refer to the building's architecture as "ungainly" because of its juxtaposition of disparate stylistic elements that fail to provide a cohesive composition. The lower story façade features black marble panels on the lowest level, an ornate metal entrance, columns with stylized capitals and recessed Roman arched windows. The middle part of the building is a conservative office building with a smooth limestone surface punctuated by windows. Most of the south elevation and part of the west elevation, however, are clad in buff-colored brick. The building is capped by a pedimented temple and a three-story-tall clock tower. Four 6-foot (1.8 m) statues of eagles sit at the corners of the tower. The clock faces are 10 feet (3.0 m) in diameter. The total height of the building is 255 feet (78 m), which makes it the tallest building in the Quad City area.

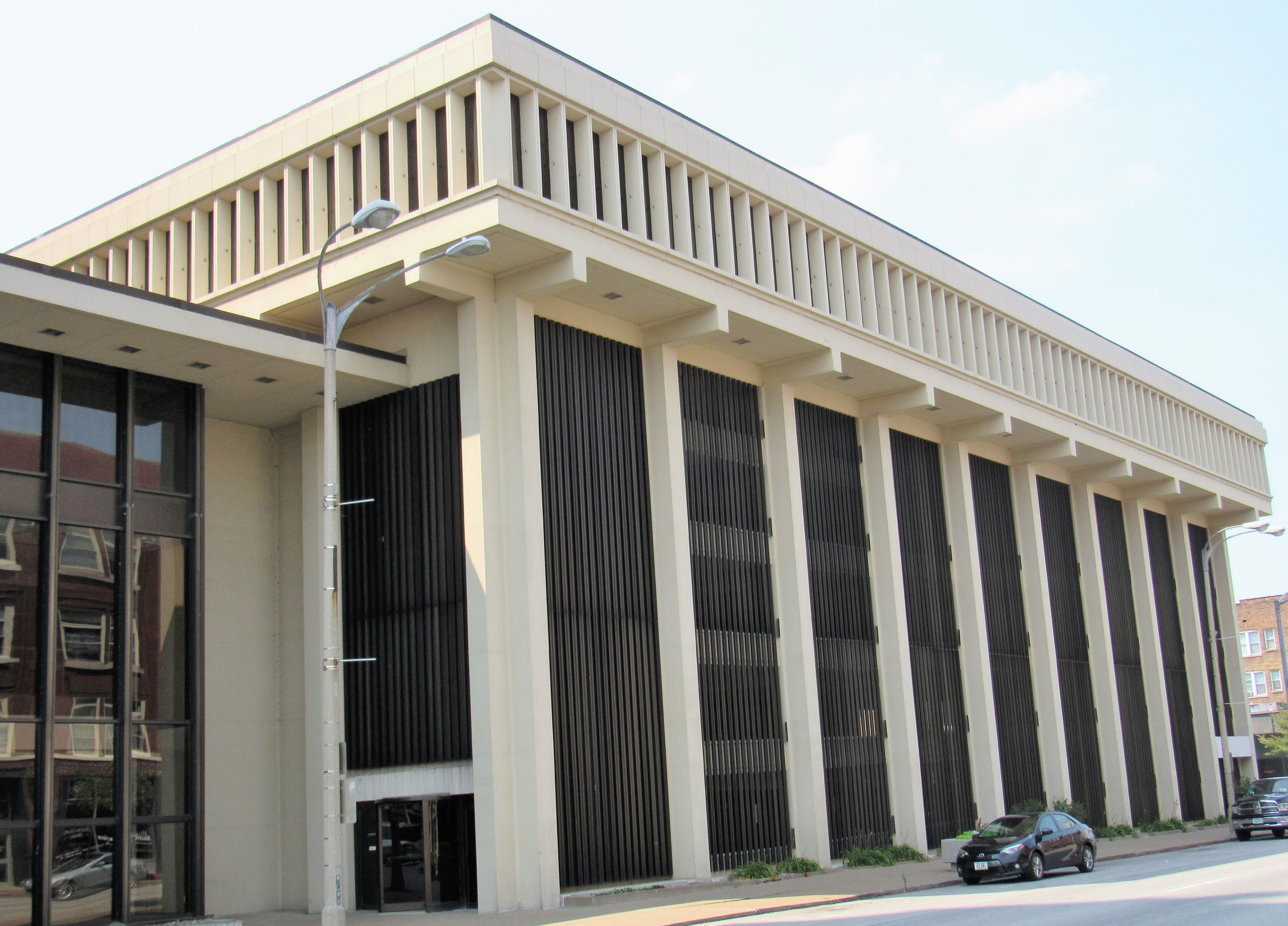
Parking garage (1971)

The building has retained its original banking room, a multi-story space with an elaborately painted ceiling. The space is lit by the large Roman arched windows on the east elevation. The ceiling is a canopy of groin vaults and is painted in a multi-colored design. A painting by Davenport artist Hiram Thompsen depicting the signing of the treaty between the Sauk and Meskwaki tribes and the US government after the Black Hawk War has hung prominently on the south wall since 1928. The original wrought iron teller "cages" remain and the rest of the interior features dark wood and marble elements.

The six-story parking structure with additional space for the bank was designed by the Detroit engineering firm Richard C. Rich & Associates. The addition follows the New Formalism style of architecture. It is made up of five stories of parking comprising 250 parking spaces, and a sixth floor that cantilevers over the lower floors. The top floor originally housed office space. The panels that hold up the structure are cast concrete and the screen is made of aluminum. A continuous circular ramp located in the center provides access to all of the parking levels. The parking structure is connected to the bank/office building by a three-story hyphen that reflects the modern parking structure architecturally. Its north elevation is primarily glass

== Artwork ==
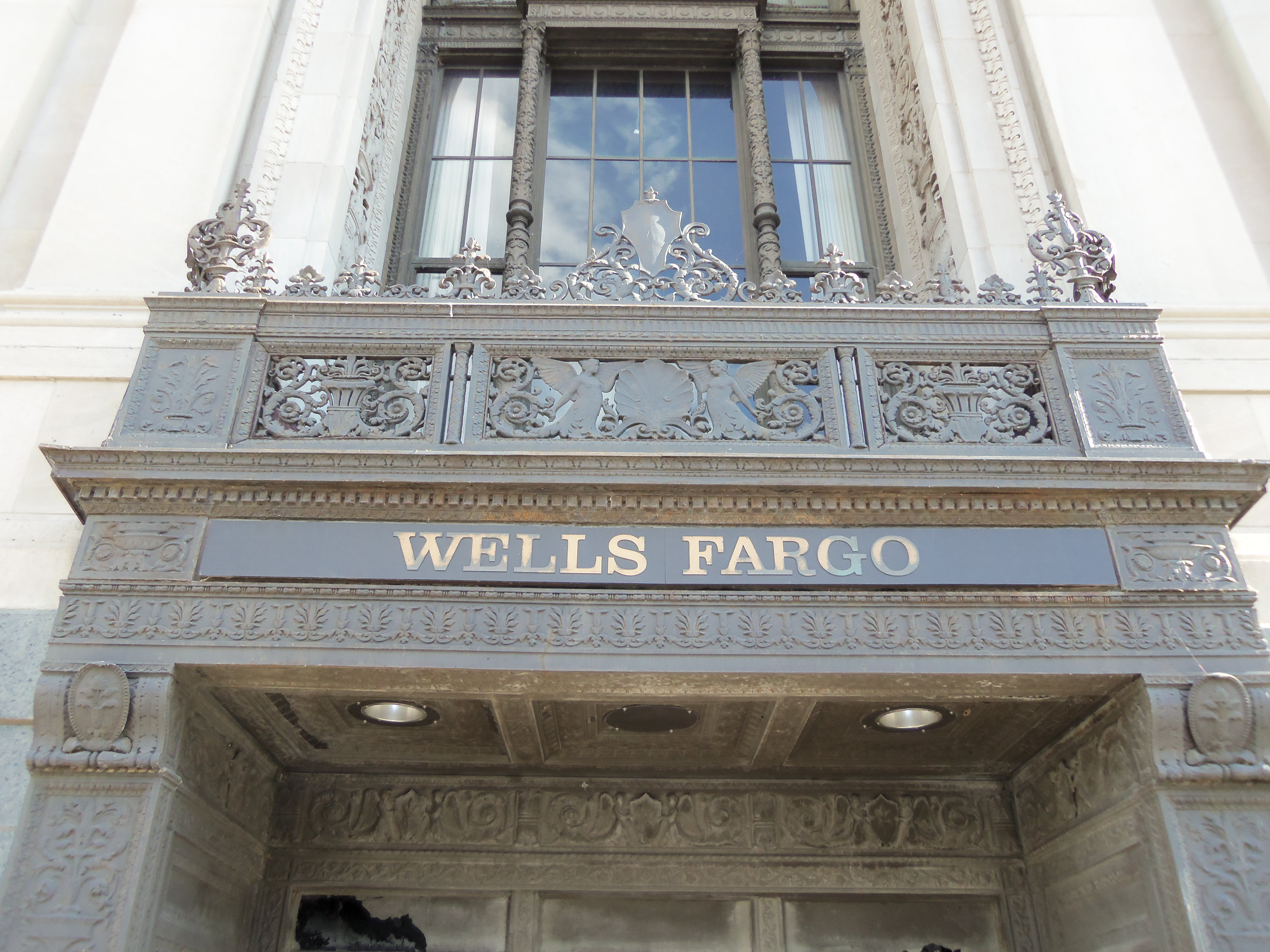
Entrance detail

The ceiling decoration of the main banking room was designed by Chicago artist Alexander Rinoskopf and was executed by the Davenport decorating firm of Hartman and Sedding. Ten men created the stencils on 85 yards (78 m) of paper and two artists rendered the work in oils. The Italian Renaissance style of work features spirals, rosettes, festoons, griffins, swans and masks. In addition, there are also ten murals that are 6 feet (2 m) high, which provide a chronological history of Davenport from its earliest times to the American Civil War. The murals depict the arrival of the first Europeans to this part of the Mississippi River Valley (1654); the Sauk warrior Black Hawk (1812); the battle on Davenport's Credit Island in the War of 1812 (1814); the last bison chased from what is now the Quad Cities (1816); the construction of Fort Armstrong on what is now Arsenal Island (1817); the first steamboat up the Mississippi River (1823); the establishment of Davenport and immigration to the new town (1836); Davenport's first school (1838); the first railroad bridge across the Mississippi River (1856); and the Civil War training camps that operated in Davenport (1861).

The largest mural occupies the south wall of the building and depicts the signing of the Black Hawk Treaty in September 1832. The treaty was signed at what is now Fifth and Farnam Streets in Davenport. Hiram Thompsen, who created the painting, was a native of Cincinnati and studied at the Chicago Art Institute and the Chicago Academy of Fine Arts. He was a commercial artist who went on to do advertising artwork for Davenport-based Gordon-Van Tine and Montgomery Ward. The painting measures 15 by 9 feet (5 by 3 m). It features the likenesses of General Winfield Scott, his interpreter and Davenport founder Antoine LeClaire, and the Native American chiefs Keokuk and Pashapaho.
