= Weary and Alford Company =

American architecture firm

- Industry: Architecture
- Founders: Edwin Delos Weary; Willam Headley Alford
- Headquarters: Chicago, Illinois, United States
- Key people: Oscar Wenderoth; E. F. Weary; R. D. Weary

Weary and Alford Company was an American architectural firm with partners Edwin Delos Weary and Willam Headley Alford. The firm was known for its design of office buildings and bank buildings and was headquartered in Chicago. The firm also employed Oscar Wenderoth, E. F. Weary, and R. D. Weary. Several buildings designed by the firm are listed on the National Register of Historic Places (NRHP).

Weary wrote a letter to a special committee of the U.S. Senate on issues facing the industry and building costs. He also wrote about wartime issues facing the industry in 1917 in Town Development He also wrote an article touting building bank buildings with the bank one floor above street level to allow for commerce on the ground floor to bring in rent.

Weary's brother Frank O. Weary was a prominent architect working out of Akron, Ohio and has several buildings listed on the NRHP.

== Weary & Alford ==
- First National Bank and Trust Building (1926), 43–53 Public Sq., Lima, Ohio, NRHP-listed Weary & Alford of Chicago, Illinois
- Sioux Falls National Bank Building, 100 N. Phillips Ave., Sioux Falls, South Dakota, NRHP-listed Weary & Alford
- City National Bank (Galveston, Texas) (1920), 2219 Ave. D, Galveston, Texas Weary & Alford Co. NRHP-listed
- Noel State Bank, Chicago
- Woodlawn Trust and Savings Bank, Chicago
- Merchants National Bank (1926) at W 2nd Ave near 3rd St SE in Cedar Rapids, Iowa
- American Commercial and Savings Bank (1927), at 203 W 3rd Street in Davenport, Iowa
- Comerica Tower (Old Merchants National Bank and Trust Company Tower at 25 West Michigan Mall in Calhoun County, Michigan
- Kalamazoo City Hall at 241 West South Street in Kalamazoo, Michigan
