= List of minor planets: 825001–826000 =

The following is a partial list of minor planets, running from minor-planet number 825001 through 826000, inclusive. The primary data for this and other partial lists is based on JPL's "Small-Body Orbital Elements" and data available from the Minor Planet Center. Critical list information is also provided by the MPC, unless otherwise specified from Lowell Observatory. A detailed description of the table's columns and additional sources are given on the main page including a complete list of every page in this series, and a statistical break-up on the dynamical classification of minor planets.

Also see the summary list of all named bodies in numerical and alphabetical order, and the corresponding naming citations for the number range of this particular list. New namings may only be added to this list after official publication, as the preannouncement of names is condemned by the Working Group for Small Bodies Nomenclature of the International Astronomical Union.

Near-Earth obj.	MBA (inner)	MBA (outer)	Centaur
Mars-crosser	MBA (middle)	Jupiter trojan	Trans-Neptunian obj.
Unclassified

== 825001–825100 ==
Designation			Discovery			Properties		Ref
Permanent	Provisional	Named after	Date	Site	Discoverer(s)	Category	Diam.	Ref
825001	2017 QL_{127}	—	August 23, 2017	Haleakala	Pan-STARRS 1	·	990 m	MPC · JPL
825002	2017 QE_{130}	—	July 25, 2017	Haleakala	Pan-STARRS 1	(5)	730 m	MPC · JPL
825003	2017 QK_{135}	—	August 20, 2017	Haleakala	Pan-STARRS 1	·	610 m	MPC · JPL
825004	2017 QY_{139}	—	August 24, 2017	Haleakala	Pan-STARRS 1	·	1.7 km	MPC · JPL
825005	2017 QT_{160}	—	September 6, 2013	Mount Lemmon	Mount Lemmon Survey	·	1.6 km	MPC · JPL
825006	2017 QJ_{181}	—	August 31, 2017	Haleakala	Pan-STARRS 1	·	550 m	MPC · JPL
825007	2017 QK_{218}	—	October 5, 2013	Haleakala	Pan-STARRS 1	·	1.2 km	MPC · JPL
825008	2017 RF_{1}	—	September 8, 2017	Haleakala	Pan-STARRS 1	H	490 m	MPC · JPL
825009	2017 RU_{11}	—	April 26, 2006	Kitt Peak	Spacewatch	·	460 m	MPC · JPL
825010	2017 RM_{12}	—	July 3, 2008	Siding Spring	SSS	·	1.1 km	MPC · JPL
825011	2017 RC_{17}	—	November 17, 1998	Roque de los Muchachos	A. Fitzsimmons, R. Budden	·	530 m	MPC · JPL
825012	2017 RS_{19}	—	April 18, 2012	Kitt Peak	Spacewatch	JUN	630 m	MPC · JPL
825013	2017 RX_{19}	—	December 10, 2012	Haleakala	Pan-STARRS 1	·	1.8 km	MPC · JPL
825014	2017 RK_{20}	—	January 20, 2015	Haleakala	Pan-STARRS 1	ADE	1.4 km	MPC · JPL
825015	2017 RA_{24}	—	October 12, 2010	Mount Lemmon	Mount Lemmon Survey	·	810 m	MPC · JPL
825016	2017 RT_{24}	—	July 27, 2017	Haleakala	Pan-STARRS 1	·	1.2 km	MPC · JPL
825017	2017 RR_{27}	—	January 20, 2015	Haleakala	Pan-STARRS 1	NEM	1.6 km	MPC · JPL
825018	2017 RS_{38}	—	October 24, 2005	Kitt Peak	Spacewatch	·	810 m	MPC · JPL
825019	2017 RT_{39}	—	May 9, 2016	Mount Lemmon	Mount Lemmon Survey	·	1.2 km	MPC · JPL
825020	2017 RM_{45}	—	February 16, 2015	Haleakala	Pan-STARRS 1	·	2.2 km	MPC · JPL
825021	2017 RC_{47}	—	August 1, 2017	Haleakala	Pan-STARRS 1	·	1.1 km	MPC · JPL
825022	2017 RO_{51}	—	April 2, 2016	Kitt Peak	Spacewatch	·	1.0 km	MPC · JPL
825023	2017 RT_{52}	—	September 14, 2017	Haleakala	Pan-STARRS 1	·	2.3 km	MPC · JPL
825024	2017 RP_{66}	—	September 17, 2012	Mount Lemmon	Mount Lemmon Survey	·	1.3 km	MPC · JPL
825025	2017 RV_{76}	—	April 27, 2016	Haleakala	Pan-STARRS 1	·	1.4 km	MPC · JPL
825026	2017 RN_{79}	—	January 20, 2015	Haleakala	Pan-STARRS 1	·	2.1 km	MPC · JPL
825027	2017 RB_{81}	—	January 20, 2015	Haleakala	Pan-STARRS 1	·	1.9 km	MPC · JPL
825028	2017 RU_{81}	—	October 1, 2003	Kitt Peak	Spacewatch	DOR	1.8 km	MPC · JPL
825029	2017 RD_{82}	—	October 6, 2008	Kitt Peak	Spacewatch	·	1.3 km	MPC · JPL
825030	2017 RM_{82}	—	September 15, 2017	Haleakala	Pan-STARRS 1	AEO	790 m	MPC · JPL
825031	2017 RR_{90}	—	May 16, 2012	Mount Lemmon	Mount Lemmon Survey	·	800 m	MPC · JPL
825032	2017 RM_{100}	—	August 24, 2017	Haleakala	Pan-STARRS 1	·	2.5 km	MPC · JPL
825033	2017 RA_{104}	—	October 3, 2013	Catalina	CSS	·	1.1 km	MPC · JPL
825034	2017 RC_{104}	—	January 20, 2015	Haleakala	Pan-STARRS 1	·	1 km	MPC · JPL
825035	2017 RL_{105}	—	May 22, 2003	Kitt Peak	Spacewatch	EUN	880 m	MPC · JPL
825036	2017 RJ_{110}	—	September 1, 2017	Haleakala	Pan-STARRS 1	HNS	1.0 km	MPC · JPL
825037	2017 RV_{111}	—	August 29, 2008	Črni Vrh	Matičič, S.	·	1.3 km	MPC · JPL
825038	2017 RT_{113}	—	September 1, 2017	Haleakala	Pan-STARRS 1	·	1.1 km	MPC · JPL
825039	2017 RT_{114}	—	September 1, 2017	Haleakala	Pan-STARRS 1	·	920 m	MPC · JPL
825040	2017 RN_{117}	—	September 13, 2017	Haleakala	Pan-STARRS 1	(1547)	1.2 km	MPC · JPL
825041	2017 RG_{121}	—	September 1, 2017	Haleakala	Pan-STARRS 1	HNS	940 m	MPC · JPL
825042	2017 RY_{122}	—	September 13, 2017	Haleakala	Pan-STARRS 1	·	1.6 km	MPC · JPL
825043	2017 RF_{132}	—	September 15, 2017	Haleakala	Pan-STARRS 1	T_{j} (2.99)	2.6 km	MPC · JPL
825044	2017 RD_{140}	—	September 12, 2017	Haleakala	Pan-STARRS 1	HNS	760 m	MPC · JPL
825045	2017 RO_{158}	—	September 13, 2017	Kitt Peak	Spacewatch	·	520 m	MPC · JPL
825046	2017 SS_{7}	—	April 2, 2016	Haleakala	Pan-STARRS 1	526	2.0 km	MPC · JPL
825047	2017 SL_{9}	—	March 6, 2016	Haleakala	Pan-STARRS 1	H	410 m	MPC · JPL
825048	2017 SJ_{13}	—	December 26, 2013	XuYi	PMO NEO Survey Program	·	1.5 km	MPC · JPL
825049	2017 SE_{29}	—	August 21, 2004	Siding Spring	SSS	·	1.1 km	MPC · JPL
825050	2017 SW_{29}	—	January 30, 2011	Haleakala	Pan-STARRS 1	·	820 m	MPC · JPL
825051	2017 SX_{35}	—	July 30, 2017	Haleakala	Pan-STARRS 1	·	450 m	MPC · JPL
825052	2017 SS_{36}	—	January 22, 2015	Haleakala	Pan-STARRS 1	·	1.2 km	MPC · JPL
825053	2017 ST_{36}	—	January 20, 2015	Haleakala	Pan-STARRS 1	·	1.3 km	MPC · JPL
825054	2017 SB_{38}	—	November 10, 2013	Mount Lemmon	Mount Lemmon Survey	·	1.1 km	MPC · JPL
825055	2017 SN_{38}	—	November 11, 2013	Mount Lemmon	Mount Lemmon Survey	EUN	890 m	MPC · JPL
825056	2017 SX_{38}	—	July 25, 2006	Palomar	NEAT	·	2.4 km	MPC · JPL
825057	2017 SQ_{39}	—	September 3, 2017	Haleakala	Pan-STARRS 1	·	1.1 km	MPC · JPL
825058	2017 SN_{40}	—	December 22, 2012	Haleakala	Pan-STARRS 1	H	440 m	MPC · JPL
825059	2017 SN_{44}	—	July 25, 2011	Haleakala	Pan-STARRS 1	·	2.6 km	MPC · JPL
825060	2017 SG_{45}	—	August 25, 2012	Mount Lemmon	Mount Lemmon Survey	·	1.7 km	MPC · JPL
825061	2017 SN_{48}	—	September 3, 2008	Kitt Peak	Spacewatch	·	1.4 km	MPC · JPL
825062	2017 SU_{48}	—	September 16, 2017	Haleakala	Pan-STARRS 1	·	1.2 km	MPC · JPL
825063	2017 SA_{52}	—	December 26, 2014	Haleakala	Pan-STARRS 1	·	420 m	MPC · JPL
825064	2017 SF_{58}	—	August 17, 2012	Haleakala	Pan-STARRS 1	HOF	1.7 km	MPC · JPL
825065	2017 SD_{59}	—	September 16, 2017	Haleakala	Pan-STARRS 1	·	1.1 km	MPC · JPL
825066	2017 SY_{59}	—	November 9, 2013	Catalina	CSS	·	1.1 km	MPC · JPL
825067	2017 SG_{60}	—	November 27, 2013	Haleakala	Pan-STARRS 1	·	1.7 km	MPC · JPL
825068	2017 SB_{62}	—	April 27, 2012	Haleakala	Pan-STARRS 1	(1547)	1.1 km	MPC · JPL
825069	2017 SC_{63}	—	January 23, 2015	Haleakala	Pan-STARRS 1	EUN	900 m	MPC · JPL
825070	2017 SM_{63}	—	August 10, 2004	Socorro	LINEAR	·	950 m	MPC · JPL
825071	2017 SG_{70}	—	November 4, 2013	Mount Lemmon	Mount Lemmon Survey	·	1.2 km	MPC · JPL
825072	2017 SB_{73}	—	October 21, 2006	Mount Lemmon	Mount Lemmon Survey	·	2.2 km	MPC · JPL
825073	2017 SS_{74}	—	April 15, 2008	Mount Lemmon	Mount Lemmon Survey	·	830 m	MPC · JPL
825074	2017 SP_{79}	—	March 10, 2016	Haleakala	Pan-STARRS 1	·	860 m	MPC · JPL
825075	2017 SJ_{80}	—	March 13, 2016	Haleakala	Pan-STARRS 1	·	520 m	MPC · JPL
825076	2017 SL_{84}	—	July 30, 2017	Haleakala	Pan-STARRS 1	·	1.0 km	MPC · JPL
825077	2017 SM_{86}	—	February 5, 2011	Mount Lemmon	Mount Lemmon Survey	·	880 m	MPC · JPL
825078	2017 SW_{86}	—	July 14, 2013	Haleakala	Pan-STARRS 1	NYS	890 m	MPC · JPL
825079	2017 SR_{88}	—	September 18, 2017	Oukaïmeden	C. Rinner	·	630 m	MPC · JPL
825080	2017 SA_{89}	—	July 27, 2017	Haleakala	Pan-STARRS 1	·	2.3 km	MPC · JPL
825081	2017 SA_{93}	—	October 9, 2013	Mount Lemmon	Mount Lemmon Survey	·	980 m	MPC · JPL
825082	2017 SP_{97}	—	September 18, 2017	Haleakala	Pan-STARRS 1	·	540 m	MPC · JPL
825083	2017 SQ_{97}	—	August 24, 2017	Haleakala	Pan-STARRS 1	HYG	2.0 km	MPC · JPL
825084	2017 ST_{98}	—	May 17, 2012	Mount Lemmon	Mount Lemmon Survey	(5)	930 m	MPC · JPL
825085	2017 SL_{99}	—	October 7, 2008	Mount Lemmon	Mount Lemmon Survey	·	1.3 km	MPC · JPL
825086	2017 SX_{99}	—	February 18, 2015	Kitt Peak	Research and Education Collaborative Occultation Network	·	2.7 km	MPC · JPL
825087	2017 SB_{100}	—	May 30, 2016	Haleakala	Pan-STARRS 1	·	1.5 km	MPC · JPL
825088	2017 SB_{104}	—	March 18, 2015	Haleakala	Pan-STARRS 1	·	2.3 km	MPC · JPL
825089	2017 SC_{109}	—	August 24, 2017	Haleakala	Pan-STARRS 1	·	2.3 km	MPC · JPL
825090	2017 SU_{109}	—	August 21, 2006	Kitt Peak	Spacewatch	MAS	590 m	MPC · JPL
825091	2017 SA_{112}	—	September 20, 1996	Kitt Peak	Spacewatch	·	1.2 km	MPC · JPL
825092	2017 SQ_{113}	—	October 17, 2008	Kitt Peak	Spacewatch	·	1.5 km	MPC · JPL
825093	2017 SV_{114}	—	September 23, 2017	Haleakala	Pan-STARRS 1	·	670 m	MPC · JPL
825094	2017 SM_{118}	—	January 15, 2015	Haleakala	Pan-STARRS 1	MAR	710 m	MPC · JPL
825095	2017 SP_{126}	—	August 21, 2011	Les Engarouines	L. Bernasconi	·	2.1 km	MPC · JPL
825096	2017 SP_{127}	—	January 7, 2010	Kitt Peak	Spacewatch	·	1.3 km	MPC · JPL
825097	2017 SL_{128}	—	August 11, 2004	Palomar	NEAT	(1547)	1.2 km	MPC · JPL
825098	2017 SC_{130}	—	August 28, 2006	Kitt Peak	Spacewatch	·	870 m	MPC · JPL
825099	2017 SH_{131}	—	November 4, 2010	Mount Lemmon	Mount Lemmon Survey	V	530 m	MPC · JPL
825100	2017 SO_{136}	—	November 6, 2013	Mount Lemmon	Mount Lemmon Survey	·	980 m	MPC · JPL

== 825101–825200 ==
back to top

Designation			Discovery			Properties		Ref
Permanent	Provisional	Named after	Date	Site	Discoverer(s)	Category	Diam.	Ref
825101	2017 SH_{141}	—	September 29, 2017	Haleakala	Pan-STARRS 1	·	400 m	MPC · JPL
825102	2017 SA_{145}	—	April 18, 2015	Cerro Tololo	DECam	·	2.1 km	MPC · JPL
825103	2017 SM_{148}	—	September 6, 2008	Mount Lemmon	Mount Lemmon Survey	·	1.2 km	MPC · JPL
825104	2017 SB_{149}	—	September 19, 2017	Haleakala	Pan-STARRS 1	·	820 m	MPC · JPL
825105	2017 SE_{153}	—	September 17, 2017	Haleakala	Pan-STARRS 1	·	1.3 km	MPC · JPL
825106	2017 SP_{155}	—	September 23, 2017	Haleakala	Pan-STARRS 1	·	440 m	MPC · JPL
825107	2017 SU_{163}	—	September 17, 2017	Haleakala	Pan-STARRS 1	·	1.2 km	MPC · JPL
825108	2017 SW_{168}	—	May 1, 2016	Haleakala	Pan-STARRS 1	·	880 m	MPC · JPL
825109	2017 SM_{172}	—	August 30, 2011	Piszkés-tető	K. Sárneczky, S. Kürti	LUT	2.8 km	MPC · JPL
825110	2017 SK_{173}	—	September 23, 2017	Haleakala	Pan-STARRS 1	·	730 m	MPC · JPL
825111	2017 SD_{175}	—	September 22, 2017	Haleakala	Pan-STARRS 1	·	1.2 km	MPC · JPL
825112	2017 ST_{188}	—	April 18, 2015	Cerro Tololo	DECam	·	1.2 km	MPC · JPL
825113	2017 SU_{188}	—	September 30, 2017	Haleakala	Pan-STARRS 1	·	1.5 km	MPC · JPL
825114	2017 ST_{190}	—	September 27, 2017	Mount Lemmon	Mount Lemmon Survey	·	1.0 km	MPC · JPL
825115	2017 SW_{192}	—	October 8, 2008	Kitt Peak	Spacewatch	·	1.3 km	MPC · JPL
825116	2017 SB_{194}	—	August 7, 2008	Kitt Peak	Spacewatch	·	1.1 km	MPC · JPL
825117	2017 SZ_{195}	—	September 30, 2017	Haleakala	Pan-STARRS 1	·	990 m	MPC · JPL
825118	2017 SD_{196}	—	May 20, 2015	Cerro Tololo	DECam	·	2.2 km	MPC · JPL
825119	2017 SL_{198}	—	September 23, 2017	Haleakala	Pan-STARRS 1	·	1.5 km	MPC · JPL
825120	2017 SA_{200}	—	September 24, 2017	Haleakala	Pan-STARRS 1	·	1.3 km	MPC · JPL
825121	2017 SB_{203}	—	September 27, 2017	Haleakala	Pan-STARRS 1	·	1.4 km	MPC · JPL
825122	2017 SH_{206}	—	September 27, 2017	Mount Lemmon	Mount Lemmon Survey	·	2.7 km	MPC · JPL
825123	2017 SM_{206}	—	September 25, 2017	Haleakala	Pan-STARRS 1	·	1.6 km	MPC · JPL
825124	2017 SV_{209}	—	September 23, 2017	Haleakala	Pan-STARRS 1	·	1.4 km	MPC · JPL
825125	2017 SA_{210}	—	September 23, 2017	Haleakala	Pan-STARRS 1	·	1.2 km	MPC · JPL
825126	2017 SC_{218}	—	May 1, 2016	Cerro Tololo	DECam	·	490 m	MPC · JPL
825127	2017 SL_{218}	—	August 31, 2017	Mount Lemmon	Mount Lemmon Survey	PHO	610 m	MPC · JPL
825128	2017 SF_{222}	—	September 26, 2017	Haleakala	Pan-STARRS 1	·	910 m	MPC · JPL
825129	2017 SU_{223}	—	September 24, 2017	Haleakala	Pan-STARRS 1	·	1.4 km	MPC · JPL
825130	2017 SG_{224}	—	September 26, 2017	Haleakala	Pan-STARRS 1	·	1.4 km	MPC · JPL
825131	2017 SJ_{226}	—	September 24, 2017	Haleakala	Pan-STARRS 1	H	380 m	MPC · JPL
825132	2017 SV_{228}	—	August 28, 2006	Kitt Peak	Spacewatch	·	1.7 km	MPC · JPL
825133	2017 SF_{236}	—	September 23, 2017	Haleakala	Pan-STARRS 1	·	1.2 km	MPC · JPL
825134	2017 SZ_{237}	—	September 19, 2017	Haleakala	Pan-STARRS 1	HOF	1.6 km	MPC · JPL
825135	2017 SR_{241}	—	September 21, 2017	Haleakala	Pan-STARRS 1	·	1.7 km	MPC · JPL
825136	2017 SA_{242}	—	September 24, 2017	Haleakala	Pan-STARRS 1	·	2.2 km	MPC · JPL
825137	2017 ST_{242}	—	January 16, 2015	Haleakala	Pan-STARRS 1	·	1.0 km	MPC · JPL
825138	2017 SN_{246}	—	September 16, 2017	Haleakala	Pan-STARRS 1	·	1.9 km	MPC · JPL
825139	2017 SS_{258}	—	September 26, 2017	Haleakala	Pan-STARRS 1	·	1.4 km	MPC · JPL
825140	2017 SD_{259}	—	September 19, 2017	Haleakala	Pan-STARRS 1	V	390 m	MPC · JPL
825141	2017 SD_{263}	—	September 18, 2017	Haleakala	Pan-STARRS 1	·	880 m	MPC · JPL
825142	2017 SQ_{263}	—	September 27, 2017	Haleakala	Pan-STARRS 1	·	1.3 km	MPC · JPL
825143	2017 SV_{263}	—	September 18, 2017	Haleakala	Pan-STARRS 1	EUN	920 m	MPC · JPL
825144	2017 SA_{271}	—	September 16, 2017	Haleakala	Pan-STARRS 1	·	900 m	MPC · JPL
825145	2017 SW_{271}	—	November 2, 2013	Mount Lemmon	Mount Lemmon Survey	·	1.0 km	MPC · JPL
825146	2017 SJ_{274}	—	September 16, 2017	Haleakala	Pan-STARRS 1	(5)	820 m	MPC · JPL
825147	2017 SH_{277}	—	September 17, 2017	Haleakala	Pan-STARRS 1	·	1.1 km	MPC · JPL
825148	2017 SY_{279}	—	September 26, 2017	Mount Lemmon	Mount Lemmon Survey	HNS	710 m	MPC · JPL
825149	2017 ST_{281}	—	September 22, 2017	Haleakala	Pan-STARRS 1	·	1.4 km	MPC · JPL
825150	2017 SC_{288}	—	September 30, 2017	Haleakala	Pan-STARRS 1	·	1.5 km	MPC · JPL
825151	2017 SE_{288}	—	September 22, 2017	Haleakala	Pan-STARRS 1	·	1.7 km	MPC · JPL
825152	2017 SV_{293}	—	September 21, 2017	Haleakala	Pan-STARRS 1	·	840 m	MPC · JPL
825153	2017 SS_{302}	—	January 22, 2015	Haleakala	Pan-STARRS 1	·	1.3 km	MPC · JPL
825154	2017 SK_{306}	—	October 15, 2012	Haleakala	Pan-STARRS 1	KOR	1.0 km	MPC · JPL
825155	2017 SG_{340}	—	September 19, 2017	Haleakala	Pan-STARRS 1	·	1.3 km	MPC · JPL
825156	2017 SK_{364}	—	June 24, 2012	Mount Lemmon	Mount Lemmon Survey	·	2.4 km	MPC · JPL
825157	2017 TJ	—	October 1, 2017	Mount Lemmon	Mount Lemmon Survey	H	600 m	MPC · JPL
825158	2017 TB_{6}	—	November 10, 2009	Dauban	C. Rinner, Kugel, F.	·	470 m	MPC · JPL
825159	2017 TV_{6}	—	June 27, 2011	Mount Lemmon	Mount Lemmon Survey	H	550 m	MPC · JPL
825160	2017 TX_{6}	—	September 24, 2017	Mount Lemmon	Mount Lemmon Survey	·	1.4 km	MPC · JPL
825161	2017 TO_{9}	—	April 19, 2015	Mount Lemmon	Mount Lemmon Survey	·	1.3 km	MPC · JPL
825162	2017 TL_{14}	—	May 1, 2016	Cerro Tololo	DECam	·	520 m	MPC · JPL
825163	2017 TZ_{14}	—	July 30, 2008	Siding Spring	SSS	JUN	970 m	MPC · JPL
825164	2017 TY_{23}	—	June 30, 2008	Kitt Peak	Spacewatch	·	1.1 km	MPC · JPL
825165	2017 TX_{24}	—	October 11, 2017	Haleakala	Pan-STARRS 1	·	1.1 km	MPC · JPL
825166	2017 TP_{26}	—	September 17, 2017	Haleakala	Pan-STARRS 1	AGN	880 m	MPC · JPL
825167	2017 TA_{27}	—	October 15, 2017	Mount Lemmon	Mount Lemmon Survey	HOF	1.7 km	MPC · JPL
825168	2017 TF_{28}	—	October 13, 2017	Mount Lemmon	Mount Lemmon Survey	·	920 m	MPC · JPL
825169	2017 TE_{29}	—	October 15, 2017	Mount Lemmon	Mount Lemmon Survey	·	440 m	MPC · JPL
825170	2017 TA_{30}	—	October 12, 2017	Mount Lemmon	Mount Lemmon Survey	·	1.3 km	MPC · JPL
825171	2017 TE_{31}	—	October 10, 2017	Haleakala	Pan-STARRS 1	H	410 m	MPC · JPL
825172	2017 TG_{31}	—	October 15, 2017	Mount Lemmon	Mount Lemmon Survey	·	950 m	MPC · JPL
825173	2017 TQ_{31}	—	October 10, 2017	Mount Lemmon	Mount Lemmon Survey	H	420 m	MPC · JPL
825174	2017 TC_{49}	—	October 15, 2017	Mount Lemmon	Mount Lemmon Survey	·	1.4 km	MPC · JPL
825175	2017 UB_{3}	—	September 18, 2017	Haleakala	Pan-STARRS 1	·	1.4 km	MPC · JPL
825176	2017 UC_{7}	—	May 23, 2006	Kitt Peak	Spacewatch	H	390 m	MPC · JPL
825177	2017 UY_{7}	—	October 24, 2014	Mount Lemmon	Mount Lemmon Survey	·	830 m	MPC · JPL
825178	2017 UN_{10}	—	October 7, 2007	Kitt Peak	Spacewatch	·	550 m	MPC · JPL
825179	2017 UW_{10}	—	August 27, 2006	Kitt Peak	Spacewatch	MAS	530 m	MPC · JPL
825180	2017 UU_{19}	—	May 4, 2016	Haleakala	Pan-STARRS 1	·	1.4 km	MPC · JPL
825181	2017 UC_{20}	—	July 30, 2017	Haleakala	Pan-STARRS 1	EUN	770 m	MPC · JPL
825182	2017 UC_{22}	—	January 3, 2014	Kitt Peak	Spacewatch	·	1.3 km	MPC · JPL
825183	2017 UN_{23}	—	September 21, 2008	Mount Lemmon	Mount Lemmon Survey	·	1.1 km	MPC · JPL
825184	2017 UP_{26}	—	May 9, 2016	Mount Lemmon	Mount Lemmon Survey	·	1.3 km	MPC · JPL
825185	2017 UZ_{26}	—	May 29, 2008	Mount Lemmon	Mount Lemmon Survey	·	690 m	MPC · JPL
825186	2017 UU_{33}	—	May 4, 2005	Mauna Kea	Veillet, C.	·	1.7 km	MPC · JPL
825187	2017 UQ_{34}	—	November 19, 2000	Socorro	LINEAR	·	1.4 km	MPC · JPL
825188	2017 UP_{36}	—	November 18, 2006	Kitt Peak	Spacewatch	·	900 m	MPC · JPL
825189	2017 UK_{40}	—	December 1, 2006	Mount Lemmon	Mount Lemmon Survey	·	1.1 km	MPC · JPL
825190	2017 UU_{41}	—	September 2, 2017	Haleakala	Pan-STARRS 1	EUN	1.0 km	MPC · JPL
825191	2017 UA_{42}	—	September 24, 2011	Haleakala	Pan-STARRS 1	·	2.3 km	MPC · JPL
825192	2017 UR_{43}	—	September 4, 2014	Haleakala	Pan-STARRS 1	H	460 m	MPC · JPL
825193	2017 UD_{47}	—	February 18, 2015	Haleakala	Pan-STARRS 1	BRA	1.1 km	MPC · JPL
825194	2017 UW_{48}	—	September 24, 2017	Haleakala	Pan-STARRS 1	DOR	1.8 km	MPC · JPL
825195	2017 UD_{53}	—	October 30, 2017	Haleakala	Pan-STARRS 1	THB	2.1 km	MPC · JPL
825196	2017 UJ_{54}	—	October 28, 2017	Haleakala	Pan-STARRS 1	·	1.7 km	MPC · JPL
825197	2017 UN_{56}	—	October 22, 2017	Mount Lemmon	Mount Lemmon Survey	·	690 m	MPC · JPL
825198	2017 UB_{57}	—	October 20, 2017	Mount Lemmon	Mount Lemmon Survey	·	680 m	MPC · JPL
825199	2017 UK_{61}	—	October 30, 2017	Haleakala	Pan-STARRS 1	·	670 m	MPC · JPL
825200	2017 US_{69}	—	May 3, 2016	Cerro Tololo	DECam	·	530 m	MPC · JPL

== 825201–825300 ==
back to top

Designation			Discovery			Properties		Ref
Permanent	Provisional	Named after	Date	Site	Discoverer(s)	Category	Diam.	Ref
825201	2017 UT_{71}	—	September 7, 2004	Kitt Peak	Spacewatch	·	920 m	MPC · JPL
825202	2017 UX_{71}	—	March 28, 2016	Cerro Tololo	DECam	·	470 m	MPC · JPL
825203	2017 UF_{77}	—	September 29, 2008	Mount Lemmon	Mount Lemmon Survey	·	1.0 km	MPC · JPL
825204	2017 UP_{77}	—	October 28, 2017	Haleakala	Pan-STARRS 1	H	380 m	MPC · JPL
825205	2017 UH_{83}	—	October 30, 2017	Haleakala	Pan-STARRS 1	·	530 m	MPC · JPL
825206	2017 UQ_{83}	—	April 18, 2015	Cerro Tololo	DECam	·	1.5 km	MPC · JPL
825207	2017 UE_{84}	—	September 22, 2017	Haleakala	Pan-STARRS 1	·	590 m	MPC · JPL
825208	2017 UD_{89}	—	October 30, 2017	Haleakala	Pan-STARRS 1	·	900 m	MPC · JPL
825209	2017 UK_{91}	—	October 28, 2017	Haleakala	Pan-STARRS 1	·	1.4 km	MPC · JPL
825210	2017 UE_{92}	—	April 18, 2015	Cerro Tololo	DECam	KOR	900 m	MPC · JPL
825211	2017 UA_{93}	—	October 30, 2017	Haleakala	Pan-STARRS 1	·	1.9 km	MPC · JPL
825212	2017 UZ_{94}	—	October 24, 2017	Mount Lemmon	Mount Lemmon Survey	GEF	1.0 km	MPC · JPL
825213	2017 UJ_{96}	—	October 29, 2017	Mount Lemmon	Mount Lemmon Survey	MAR	960 m	MPC · JPL
825214	2017 UL_{97}	—	May 20, 2015	Cerro Tololo	DECam	·	820 m	MPC · JPL
825215	2017 UM_{97}	—	October 23, 2017	Mount Lemmon	Mount Lemmon Survey	ADE	1.3 km	MPC · JPL
825216	2017 UQ_{97}	—	October 27, 2017	Mount Lemmon	Mount Lemmon Survey	·	1.2 km	MPC · JPL
825217	2017 UD_{98}	—	October 27, 2017	Haleakala	Pan-STARRS 1	EOS	1.2 km	MPC · JPL
825218	2017 UH_{101}	—	October 20, 2017	Haleakala	Pan-STARRS 1	EUN	1.2 km	MPC · JPL
825219	2017 UC_{102}	—	October 24, 2017	Mount Lemmon	Mount Lemmon Survey	·	1.7 km	MPC · JPL
825220	2017 UE_{102}	—	October 29, 2017	Haleakala	Pan-STARRS 1	·	1.3 km	MPC · JPL
825221	2017 UF_{104}	—	May 20, 2015	Cerro Tololo	DECam	·	620 m	MPC · JPL
825222	2017 UD_{107}	—	October 30, 2017	Haleakala	Pan-STARRS 1	EOS	1.2 km	MPC · JPL
825223	2017 UB_{108}	—	October 28, 2017	Haleakala	Pan-STARRS 1	·	1.2 km	MPC · JPL
825224	2017 UQ_{108}	—	October 23, 2017	Mount Lemmon	Mount Lemmon Survey	V	410 m	MPC · JPL
825225	2017 UD_{110}	—	April 19, 2015	Cerro Tololo	DECam	·	1.5 km	MPC · JPL
825226	2017 UO_{113}	—	October 27, 2017	Mount Lemmon	Mount Lemmon Survey	·	560 m	MPC · JPL
825227	2017 US_{113}	—	March 1, 2016	Haleakala	Pan-STARRS 1	·	520 m	MPC · JPL
825228	2017 UU_{117}	—	October 22, 2017	Haleakala	Pan-STARRS 1	·	1.1 km	MPC · JPL
825229	2017 UD_{119}	—	March 28, 2016	Cerro Tololo	DECam	·	520 m	MPC · JPL
825230	2017 UC_{122}	—	October 28, 2017	Haleakala	Pan-STARRS 1	AGN	860 m	MPC · JPL
825231	2017 UF_{122}	—	October 30, 2017	Haleakala	Pan-STARRS 1	·	1.3 km	MPC · JPL
825232	2017 UL_{132}	—	October 19, 2017	Haleakala	Pan-STARRS 1	(5)	850 m	MPC · JPL
825233	2017 UG_{140}	—	October 15, 2017	Mount Lemmon	Mount Lemmon Survey	HOF	1.8 km	MPC · JPL
825234	2017 UN_{145}	—	October 23, 2017	Mount Lemmon	Mount Lemmon Survey	HOF	1.9 km	MPC · JPL
825235	2017 UZ_{149}	—	October 27, 2017	Haleakala	Pan-STARRS 1	·	1.2 km	MPC · JPL
825236	2017 UV_{151}	—	September 21, 2012	Mount Lemmon	Mount Lemmon Survey	·	1.2 km	MPC · JPL
825237	2017 UX_{170}	—	October 29, 2017	Haleakala	Pan-STARRS 1	·	1.2 km	MPC · JPL
825238	2017 UQ_{173}	—	April 26, 2014	Cerro Tololo	DECam	TIR	1.7 km	MPC · JPL
825239	2017 UQ_{177}	—	October 28, 2017	Mount Lemmon	Mount Lemmon Survey	·	1.9 km	MPC · JPL
825240	2017 UA_{184}	—	October 21, 2017	Mount Lemmon	Mount Lemmon Survey	615	1.1 km	MPC · JPL
825241	2017 UK_{193}	—	October 30, 2017	Haleakala	Pan-STARRS 1	·	1.7 km	MPC · JPL
825242	2017 US_{229}	—	October 28, 2017	Haleakala	Pan-STARRS 1	·	1.7 km	MPC · JPL
825243	2017 VL	—	August 22, 2017	Haleakala	Pan-STARRS 1	BAR	950 m	MPC · JPL
825244	2017 VB_{4}	—	October 10, 2004	Kitt Peak	Spacewatch	·	1.1 km	MPC · JPL
825245	2017 VF_{8}	—	October 4, 2008	Mount Lemmon	Mount Lemmon Survey	DOR	1.6 km	MPC · JPL
825246	2017 VO_{8}	—	October 22, 2003	Kitt Peak	Spacewatch	·	540 m	MPC · JPL
825247	2017 VP_{12}	—	May 31, 2014	Haleakala	Pan-STARRS 1	H	470 m	MPC · JPL
825248	2017 VP_{16}	—	December 8, 2012	Kitt Peak	Spacewatch	·	1.8 km	MPC · JPL
825249	2017 VS_{16}	—	November 13, 2017	Haleakala	Pan-STARRS 1	·	1.2 km	MPC · JPL
825250	2017 VL_{19}	—	January 7, 2009	Kitt Peak	Spacewatch	·	540 m	MPC · JPL
825251	2017 VW_{19}	—	October 19, 2007	Kitt Peak	Spacewatch	·	560 m	MPC · JPL
825252	2017 VM_{21}	—	September 17, 2006	Kitt Peak	Spacewatch	·	1.7 km	MPC · JPL
825253	2017 VV_{21}	—	August 22, 2003	Palomar	NEAT	·	1.8 km	MPC · JPL
825254	2017 VZ_{23}	—	September 23, 2008	Mount Lemmon	Mount Lemmon Survey	·	1.2 km	MPC · JPL
825255	2017 VB_{28}	—	April 11, 2015	Mount Lemmon	Mount Lemmon Survey	·	1.3 km	MPC · JPL
825256	2017 VZ_{29}	—	August 18, 2006	Kitt Peak	Spacewatch	·	650 m	MPC · JPL
825257	2017 VR_{34}	—	May 1, 2016	Cerro Tololo	DECam	·	500 m	MPC · JPL
825258	2017 VA_{35}	—	November 14, 2017	Mount Lemmon	Mount Lemmon Survey	·	810 m	MPC · JPL
825259	2017 VB_{35}	—	April 19, 2015	Cerro Tololo	DECam	ADE	1.5 km	MPC · JPL
825260	2017 VH_{40}	—	November 10, 2017	Haleakala	Pan-STARRS 1	ADE	1.3 km	MPC · JPL
825261	2017 VU_{42}	—	November 14, 2017	Mount Lemmon	Mount Lemmon Survey	·	690 m	MPC · JPL
825262	2017 VL_{43}	—	August 26, 2012	Haleakala	Pan-STARRS 1	·	1.2 km	MPC · JPL
825263	2017 VJ_{45}	—	November 14, 2017	Cerro Paranal	Gaia Ground Based Optical Tracking	·	1.4 km	MPC · JPL
825264	2017 VP_{45}	—	November 13, 2017	Haleakala	Pan-STARRS 1	·	450 m	MPC · JPL
825265	2017 VY_{51}	—	August 24, 2017	San Pedro de Atacama	Observatory, Polonia	·	950 m	MPC · JPL
825266	2017 VE_{62}	—	November 13, 2017	Haleakala	Pan-STARRS 1	·	440 m	MPC · JPL
825267	2017 WQ_{3}	—	September 24, 2017	Haleakala	Pan-STARRS 1	EUN	860 m	MPC · JPL
825268	2017 WW_{6}	—	September 26, 2017	Mount Lemmon	Mount Lemmon Survey	·	1.2 km	MPC · JPL
825269	2017 WS_{7}	—	October 30, 2017	Haleakala	Pan-STARRS 1	·	1.7 km	MPC · JPL
825270	2017 WW_{17}	—	December 27, 2013	Mount Lemmon	Mount Lemmon Survey	(1547)	1.2 km	MPC · JPL
825271	2017 WB_{18}	—	February 2, 2013	Catalina	CSS	·	1.6 km	MPC · JPL
825272	2017 WY_{22}	—	September 30, 2017	Haleakala	Pan-STARRS 1	·	450 m	MPC · JPL
825273	2017 WW_{26}	—	November 21, 2017	Haleakala	Pan-STARRS 1	·	1.1 km	MPC · JPL
825274	2017 WP_{29}	—	October 2, 2013	Mount Lemmon	Mount Lemmon Survey	·	940 m	MPC · JPL
825275	2017 WQ_{29}	—	November 3, 2004	Catalina	CSS	(1547)	950 m	MPC · JPL
825276	2017 WP_{35}	—	November 17, 2017	Haleakala	Pan-STARRS 1	EUN	870 m	MPC · JPL
825277	2017 WB_{36}	—	August 4, 2008	Siding Spring	SSS	·	1.2 km	MPC · JPL
825278	2017 WD_{36}	—	November 25, 2017	Mount Lemmon	Mount Lemmon Survey	·	1.4 km	MPC · JPL
825279	2017 WQ_{36}	—	November 21, 2017	Haleakala	Pan-STARRS 1	(2076)	410 m	MPC · JPL
825280	2017 WP_{38}	—	November 25, 2017	XuYi	PMO NEO Survey Program	·	2.7 km	MPC · JPL
825281	2017 WG_{41}	—	October 27, 2017	Haleakala	Pan-STARRS 1	·	470 m	MPC · JPL
825282	2017 WW_{41}	—	November 17, 2017	Mount Lemmon	Mount Lemmon Survey	·	1.1 km	MPC · JPL
825283	2017 WT_{42}	—	November 24, 2017	Mount Lemmon	Mount Lemmon Survey	·	1.3 km	MPC · JPL
825284	2017 WA_{43}	—	September 30, 2010	Mount Lemmon	Mount Lemmon Survey	·	520 m	MPC · JPL
825285	2017 WC_{45}	—	November 26, 2017	Mount Lemmon	Mount Lemmon Survey	·	480 m	MPC · JPL
825286	2017 WX_{45}	—	November 16, 2017	Mount Lemmon	Mount Lemmon Survey	·	520 m	MPC · JPL
825287	2017 WH_{47}	—	November 18, 2017	Haleakala	Pan-STARRS 1	·	1.4 km	MPC · JPL
825288	2017 WM_{47}	—	November 17, 2017	Haleakala	Pan-STARRS 1	·	1.4 km	MPC · JPL
825289	2017 WD_{48}	—	November 21, 2017	Mount Lemmon	Mount Lemmon Survey	·	1.2 km	MPC · JPL
825290	2017 WZ_{49}	—	November 27, 2017	Mount Lemmon	Mount Lemmon Survey	·	680 m	MPC · JPL
825291	2017 WL_{53}	—	November 27, 2017	Mount Lemmon	Mount Lemmon Survey	·	610 m	MPC · JPL
825292	2017 WG_{58}	—	November 27, 2017	Mount Lemmon	Mount Lemmon Survey	(194)	1.3 km	MPC · JPL
825293	2017 WT_{60}	—	July 4, 2016	Haleakala	Pan-STARRS 1	·	1.4 km	MPC · JPL
825294	2017 WP_{62}	—	November 16, 2017	Mount Lemmon	Mount Lemmon Survey	·	1.3 km	MPC · JPL
825295	2017 WE_{63}	—	November 21, 2017	Haleakala	Pan-STARRS 1	·	710 m	MPC · JPL
825296	2017 WN_{67}	—	November 19, 2017	Haleakala	Pan-STARRS 1	·	1.4 km	MPC · JPL
825297	2017 WO_{71}	—	November 26, 2017	Mount Lemmon	Mount Lemmon Survey	·	1.4 km	MPC · JPL
825298	2017 WV_{81}	—	November 21, 2017	Haleakala	Pan-STARRS 1	·	780 m	MPC · JPL
825299	2017 WT_{86}	—	November 21, 2017	Haleakala	Pan-STARRS 1	·	1.4 km	MPC · JPL
825300	2017 XU_{1}	—	November 18, 2007	Catalina	CSS	·	1.0 km	MPC · JPL

== 825301–825400 ==
back to top

Designation			Discovery			Properties		Ref
Permanent	Provisional	Named after	Date	Site	Discoverer(s)	Category	Diam.	Ref
825301	2017 XV_{1}	—	June 24, 2014	Haleakala	Pan-STARRS 1	·	370 m	MPC · JPL
825302	2017 XL_{5}	—	October 28, 2017	Haleakala	Pan-STARRS 1	·	510 m	MPC · JPL
825303	2017 XT_{9}	—	December 26, 2014	Haleakala	Pan-STARRS 1	·	460 m	MPC · JPL
825304	2017 XT_{10}	—	October 22, 2017	Mount Lemmon	Mount Lemmon Survey	NYS	560 m	MPC · JPL
825305	2017 XK_{11}	—	September 24, 2017	Haleakala	Pan-STARRS 1	·	2.0 km	MPC · JPL
825306	2017 XD_{13}	—	October 21, 2017	Mount Lemmon	Mount Lemmon Survey	·	900 m	MPC · JPL
825307	2017 XO_{14}	—	October 28, 2017	Haleakala	Pan-STARRS 1	V	350 m	MPC · JPL
825308	2017 XX_{14}	—	February 12, 2011	Mount Lemmon	Mount Lemmon Survey	MAS	540 m	MPC · JPL
825309	2017 XB_{15}	—	October 28, 2017	Haleakala	Pan-STARRS 1	·	1.4 km	MPC · JPL
825310	2017 XA_{17}	—	September 8, 2004	Palomar	NEAT	·	1.0 km	MPC · JPL
825311	2017 XS_{17}	—	September 17, 2010	Mount Lemmon	Mount Lemmon Survey	·	610 m	MPC · JPL
825312	2017 XS_{18}	—	October 28, 2017	Mount Lemmon	Mount Lemmon Survey	·	1.3 km	MPC · JPL
825313	2017 XT_{20}	—	November 24, 2012	Nogales	M. Schwartz, P. R. Holvorcem	H	470 m	MPC · JPL
825314	2017 XE_{22}	—	July 29, 2008	Mount Lemmon	Mount Lemmon Survey	·	1.2 km	MPC · JPL
825315	2017 XU_{27}	—	September 22, 2012	Kitt Peak	Spacewatch	·	1.3 km	MPC · JPL
825316	2017 XV_{27}	—	February 2, 1997	Kitt Peak	Spacewatch	·	580 m	MPC · JPL
825317	2017 XY_{32}	—	April 14, 2016	Haleakala	Pan-STARRS 1	V	460 m	MPC · JPL
825318	2017 XQ_{34}	—	October 15, 2006	Kitt Peak	Spacewatch	·	710 m	MPC · JPL
825319	2017 XH_{36}	—	November 28, 2013	Mount Lemmon	Mount Lemmon Survey	·	920 m	MPC · JPL
825320	2017 XN_{36}	—	December 2, 2010	Kitt Peak	Spacewatch	·	560 m	MPC · JPL
825321	2017 XW_{46}	—	November 21, 2017	Haleakala	Pan-STARRS 1	·	1.2 km	MPC · JPL
825322	2017 XZ_{49}	—	October 20, 2008	Kitt Peak	Spacewatch	·	1.0 km	MPC · JPL
825323	2017 XL_{50}	—	September 22, 2017	Haleakala	Pan-STARRS 1	EUN	910 m	MPC · JPL
825324	2017 XF_{51}	—	April 23, 2014	Cerro Tololo	DECam	·	1.9 km	MPC · JPL
825325	2017 XZ_{53}	—	October 28, 2017	Haleakala	Pan-STARRS 1	·	1.8 km	MPC · JPL
825326	2017 XD_{58}	—	December 25, 2005	Kitt Peak	Spacewatch	·	880 m	MPC · JPL
825327	2017 XG_{60}	—	May 9, 2011	Kitt Peak	Spacewatch	H	370 m	MPC · JPL
825328	2017 XN_{61}	—	December 14, 2017	Mount Lemmon	Mount Lemmon Survey	AMO	120 m	MPC · JPL
825329	2017 XY_{62}	—	December 11, 2013	Haleakala	Pan-STARRS 1	·	900 m	MPC · JPL
825330	2017 XH_{63}	—	June 3, 2016	Mount Lemmon	Mount Lemmon Survey	H	500 m	MPC · JPL
825331	2017 XL_{65}	—	December 15, 2017	Mount Lemmon	Mount Lemmon Survey	TIR	2.0 km	MPC · JPL
825332	2017 XW_{65}	—	December 13, 2017	Haleakala	Pan-STARRS 1	NEM	1.8 km	MPC · JPL
825333	2017 XH_{71}	—	December 12, 2017	Mount Lemmon	Mount Lemmon Survey	·	1.6 km	MPC · JPL
825334	2017 XP_{71}	—	December 13, 2017	Haleakala	Pan-STARRS 1	·	830 m	MPC · JPL
825335	2017 XY_{72}	—	April 18, 2015	Cerro Tololo	DECam	V	440 m	MPC · JPL
825336	2017 XH_{73}	—	December 10, 2017	Haleakala	Pan-STARRS 1	·	520 m	MPC · JPL
825337	2017 XS_{73}	—	December 10, 2017	Haleakala	Pan-STARRS 1	·	610 m	MPC · JPL
825338	2017 XV_{73}	—	December 15, 2017	Mount Lemmon	Mount Lemmon Survey	·	940 m	MPC · JPL
825339	2017 XW_{73}	—	December 12, 2017	Haleakala	Pan-STARRS 1	(2076)	530 m	MPC · JPL
825340	2017 XN_{74}	—	December 12, 2017	Haleakala	Pan-STARRS 1	MAS	510 m	MPC · JPL
825341	2017 XT_{74}	—	December 12, 2017	Haleakala	Pan-STARRS 1	·	850 m	MPC · JPL
825342	2017 XE_{75}	—	December 15, 2017	Mount Lemmon	Mount Lemmon Survey	·	710 m	MPC · JPL
825343	2017 XF_{77}	—	December 12, 2017	Haleakala	Pan-STARRS 1	·	660 m	MPC · JPL
825344	2017 XZ_{79}	—	December 9, 2017	Haleakala	Pan-STARRS 1	EOS	1.2 km	MPC · JPL
825345	2017 XM_{81}	—	December 15, 2017	Mount Lemmon	Mount Lemmon Survey	·	1.5 km	MPC · JPL
825346	2017 XU_{82}	—	December 12, 2017	Haleakala	Pan-STARRS 1	·	2.4 km	MPC · JPL
825347	2017 XJ_{83}	—	December 12, 2017	Haleakala	Pan-STARRS 1	·	1.3 km	MPC · JPL
825348	2017 XW_{88}	—	December 15, 2017	Mount Lemmon	Mount Lemmon Survey	·	2.1 km	MPC · JPL
825349	2017 XQ_{89}	—	December 9, 2017	Kitt Peak	Spacewatch	·	1.4 km	MPC · JPL
825350	2017 XW_{97}	—	December 13, 2017	Haleakala	Pan-STARRS 1	·	2.1 km	MPC · JPL
825351	2017 XP_{98}	—	December 15, 2017	Mount Lemmon	Mount Lemmon Survey	·	2.1 km	MPC · JPL
825352	2017 XA_{100}	—	December 15, 2017	Mount Lemmon	Mount Lemmon Survey	·	670 m	MPC · JPL
825353	2017 YK_{2}	—	November 29, 2013	Mount Lemmon	Mount Lemmon Survey	JUN	830 m	MPC · JPL
825354	2017 YD_{4}	—	September 25, 2017	Mount Lemmon	Mount Lemmon Survey	·	2.0 km	MPC · JPL
825355	2017 YY_{10}	—	May 22, 2015	Haleakala	Pan-STARRS 1	·	1.6 km	MPC · JPL
825356	2017 YC_{11}	—	May 19, 2015	Haleakala	Pan-STARRS 1	·	1.5 km	MPC · JPL
825357	2017 YQ_{12}	—	January 29, 2011	Kitt Peak	Spacewatch	·	660 m	MPC · JPL
825358	2017 YO_{13}	—	February 1, 2009	Mount Lemmon	Mount Lemmon Survey	·	1.4 km	MPC · JPL
825359	2017 YJ_{14}	—	October 10, 2012	Haleakala	Pan-STARRS 1	·	1.5 km	MPC · JPL
825360	2017 YG_{16}	—	March 8, 2005	Mount Lemmon	Mount Lemmon Survey	·	1.4 km	MPC · JPL
825361	2017 YD_{17}	—	December 14, 2017	Mount Lemmon	Mount Lemmon Survey	PHO	510 m	MPC · JPL
825362	2017 YL_{21}	—	December 26, 2017	Mount Lemmon	Mount Lemmon Survey	·	1.5 km	MPC · JPL
825363	2017 YO_{24}	—	February 26, 2014	Mount Lemmon	Mount Lemmon Survey	·	1.4 km	MPC · JPL
825364	2017 YR_{24}	—	December 23, 2017	Haleakala	Pan-STARRS 1	·	900 m	MPC · JPL
825365	2017 YS_{27}	—	April 28, 2014	Cerro Tololo	DECam	·	1.3 km	MPC · JPL
825366	2017 YU_{29}	—	December 12, 2006	Kitt Peak	Spacewatch	·	670 m	MPC · JPL
825367	2017 YF_{32}	—	December 23, 2017	Haleakala	Pan-STARRS 1	·	810 m	MPC · JPL
825368	2017 YK_{32}	—	December 25, 2017	Mount Lemmon	Mount Lemmon Survey	·	960 m	MPC · JPL
825369	2017 YL_{32}	—	December 27, 2017	Mount Lemmon	Mount Lemmon Survey	·	600 m	MPC · JPL
825370	2017 YM_{33}	—	December 23, 2017	Haleakala	Pan-STARRS 1	·	680 m	MPC · JPL
825371	2017 YA_{34}	—	December 23, 2017	Haleakala	Pan-STARRS 1	·	2.0 km	MPC · JPL
825372	2017 YJ_{34}	—	December 26, 2017	Mount Lemmon	Mount Lemmon Survey	·	470 m	MPC · JPL
825373	2017 YG_{35}	—	December 24, 2017	Haleakala	Pan-STARRS 1	V	430 m	MPC · JPL
825374	2017 YL_{35}	—	December 22, 2017	Haleakala	Pan-STARRS 1	·	510 m	MPC · JPL
825375	2017 YN_{35}	—	December 23, 2017	Haleakala	Pan-STARRS 1	·	560 m	MPC · JPL
825376	2017 YJ_{36}	—	May 18, 2015	Haleakala	Pan-STARRS 1	V	400 m	MPC · JPL
825377	2017 YO_{36}	—	December 29, 2017	Haleakala	Pan-STARRS 1	·	720 m	MPC · JPL
825378	2017 YP_{38}	—	December 24, 2017	Haleakala	Pan-STARRS 1	·	2.0 km	MPC · JPL
825379	2017 YW_{38}	—	December 24, 2017	Haleakala	Pan-STARRS 1	T_{j} (2.98) · 3:2	3.1 km	MPC · JPL
825380	2017 YV_{39}	—	December 23, 2017	Haleakala	Pan-STARRS 1	·	950 m	MPC · JPL
825381	2017 YO_{40}	—	December 12, 2017	Haleakala	Pan-STARRS 1	·	680 m	MPC · JPL
825382	2017 YH_{42}	—	October 29, 2003	Kitt Peak	Spacewatch	·	480 m	MPC · JPL
825383	2017 YL_{46}	—	December 23, 2017	Haleakala	Pan-STARRS 1	·	2.1 km	MPC · JPL
825384	2017 YG_{48}	—	December 23, 2017	Haleakala	Pan-STARRS 1	·	1.5 km	MPC · JPL
825385	2017 YS_{56}	—	March 9, 2007	Kitt Peak	Spacewatch	·	1 km	MPC · JPL
825386	2017 YN_{58}	—	December 24, 2017	Haleakala	Pan-STARRS 1	·	2.5 km	MPC · JPL
825387	2017 YZ_{61}	—	December 23, 2017	Haleakala	Pan-STARRS 1	·	880 m	MPC · JPL
825388	2018 AJ_{1}	—	October 23, 2004	Kitt Peak	Spacewatch	H	390 m	MPC · JPL
825389	2018 AL_{1}	—	August 29, 2011	Zelenchukskaya	T. V. Krjačko, B. Satovski	H	510 m	MPC · JPL
825390	2018 AJ_{4}	—	October 6, 2000	Kitt Peak	Spacewatch	·	1.1 km	MPC · JPL
825391	2018 AX_{6}	—	September 25, 2006	Kitt Peak	Spacewatch	·	520 m	MPC · JPL
825392	2018 AF_{9}	—	September 12, 2007	Catalina	CSS	·	1.6 km	MPC · JPL
825393	2018 AZ_{9}	—	September 6, 2013	Kitt Peak	Spacewatch	·	540 m	MPC · JPL
825394	2018 AQ_{13}	—	August 1, 2017	Haleakala	Pan-STARRS 1	PHO	860 m	MPC · JPL
825395	2018 AQ_{17}	—	December 16, 2017	Mount Lemmon	Mount Lemmon Survey	PHO	900 m	MPC · JPL
825396	2018 AC_{19}	—	January 12, 2018	Haleakala	Pan-STARRS 1	EUP	2.4 km	MPC · JPL
825397	2018 AL_{19}	—	January 15, 2018	Mount Lemmon	Mount Lemmon Survey	·	2.0 km	MPC · JPL
825398	2018 AQ_{23}	—	January 11, 2018	Haleakala	Pan-STARRS 1	·	2.6 km	MPC · JPL
825399	2018 AT_{25}	—	January 14, 2018	Haleakala	Pan-STARRS 1	VER	2.1 km	MPC · JPL
825400	2018 AX_{25}	—	January 15, 2018	Haleakala	Pan-STARRS 1	·	2.0 km	MPC · JPL

== 825401–825500 ==
back to top

Designation			Discovery			Properties		Ref
Permanent	Provisional	Named after	Date	Site	Discoverer(s)	Category	Diam.	Ref
825401	2018 AD_{27}	—	January 13, 2018	Mount Lemmon	Mount Lemmon Survey	·	1.0 km	MPC · JPL
825402	2018 AP_{27}	—	May 27, 2014	Haleakala	Pan-STARRS 1	KOR	1.0 km	MPC · JPL
825403	2018 AB_{28}	—	January 12, 2018	Mount Lemmon	Mount Lemmon Survey	EOS	1.3 km	MPC · JPL
825404	2018 AT_{30}	—	January 9, 2018	Mount Lemmon	Mount Lemmon Survey	·	610 m	MPC · JPL
825405	2018 AG_{31}	—	January 13, 2018	Mount Lemmon	Mount Lemmon Survey	·	1.6 km	MPC · JPL
825406	2018 AK_{33}	—	January 14, 2018	Haleakala	Pan-STARRS 1	·	2.0 km	MPC · JPL
825407	2018 AU_{33}	—	January 15, 2018	Haleakala	Pan-STARRS 1	·	1.0 km	MPC · JPL
825408	2018 AH_{34}	—	October 10, 2016	Mount Lemmon	Mount Lemmon Survey	MAR	860 m	MPC · JPL
825409	2018 AO_{34}	—	January 15, 2018	Haleakala	Pan-STARRS 1	·	760 m	MPC · JPL
825410	2018 AS_{34}	—	April 21, 2015	Cerro Tololo	DECam	MAS	450 m	MPC · JPL
825411	2018 AE_{36}	—	January 13, 2018	Mount Lemmon	Mount Lemmon Survey	·	520 m	MPC · JPL
825412	2018 AN_{36}	—	January 14, 2018	Haleakala	Pan-STARRS 1	MAS	530 m	MPC · JPL
825413	2018 AV_{36}	—	January 15, 2018	Haleakala	Pan-STARRS 1	·	770 m	MPC · JPL
825414	2018 AQ_{40}	—	January 14, 2018	Haleakala	Pan-STARRS 1	·	540 m	MPC · JPL
825415	2018 AD_{41}	—	January 14, 2018	Haleakala	Pan-STARRS 1	·	1.6 km	MPC · JPL
825416	2018 AK_{41}	—	January 14, 2018	Haleakala	Pan-STARRS 1	·	800 m	MPC · JPL
825417	2018 AW_{43}	—	May 25, 2015	Haleakala	Pan-STARRS 1	·	580 m	MPC · JPL
825418	2018 AE_{44}	—	January 14, 2018	Mount Lemmon	Mount Lemmon Survey	·	760 m	MPC · JPL
825419	2018 AH_{45}	—	January 14, 2018	Haleakala	Pan-STARRS 1	·	2.3 km	MPC · JPL
825420	2018 AR_{47}	—	February 2, 2009	Mount Lemmon	Mount Lemmon Survey	·	1.4 km	MPC · JPL
825421	2018 AM_{49}	—	January 14, 2018	Haleakala	Pan-STARRS 1	·	2.2 km	MPC · JPL
825422	2018 AN_{52}	—	January 12, 2018	Haleakala	Pan-STARRS 1	·	790 m	MPC · JPL
825423	2018 AC_{55}	—	January 13, 2018	Mount Lemmon	Mount Lemmon Survey	·	410 m	MPC · JPL
825424	2018 AU_{60}	—	January 14, 2018	Haleakala	Pan-STARRS 1	·	2.4 km	MPC · JPL
825425	2018 AT_{61}	—	September 27, 2016	Haleakala	Pan-STARRS 1	·	2.1 km	MPC · JPL
825426	2018 AU_{62}	—	January 13, 2018	Mount Lemmon	Mount Lemmon Survey	·	1.8 km	MPC · JPL
825427	2018 AP_{64}	—	January 12, 2018	Haleakala	Pan-STARRS 1	·	2.0 km	MPC · JPL
825428	2018 AV_{67}	—	January 14, 2018	Haleakala	Pan-STARRS 1	EUN	1.2 km	MPC · JPL
825429	2018 AK_{75}	—	January 14, 2018	Haleakala	Pan-STARRS 1	·	2.1 km	MPC · JPL
825430	2018 BY	—	January 14, 2018	Mount Lemmon	Mount Lemmon Survey	H	420 m	MPC · JPL
825431	2018 BK_{2}	—	August 24, 2011	Haleakala	Pan-STARRS 1	·	1.5 km	MPC · JPL
825432	2018 BQ_{9}	—	November 20, 2017	Haleakala	Pan-STARRS 1	·	1.6 km	MPC · JPL
825433	2018 BJ_{12}	—	October 9, 2005	Kitt Peak	Spacewatch	·	750 m	MPC · JPL
825434	2018 BD_{16}	—	January 24, 2018	Mount Lemmon	Mount Lemmon Survey	PHO	620 m	MPC · JPL
825435	2018 BR_{16}	—	January 23, 2018	Mount Lemmon	Mount Lemmon Survey	ELF	2.8 km	MPC · JPL
825436	2018 BH_{18}	—	January 27, 2018	Mount Lemmon	Mount Lemmon Survey	H	390 m	MPC · JPL
825437	2018 BX_{18}	—	November 2, 2013	Mount Lemmon	Mount Lemmon Survey	MAS	550 m	MPC · JPL
825438	2018 BX_{20}	—	January 16, 2018	Haleakala	Pan-STARRS 1	·	850 m	MPC · JPL
825439	2018 BZ_{21}	—	January 20, 2018	Haleakala	Pan-STARRS 1	EUN	940 m	MPC · JPL
825440	2018 BN_{22}	—	January 23, 2018	Mount Lemmon	Mount Lemmon Survey	·	480 m	MPC · JPL
825441	2018 BA_{23}	—	January 23, 2018	Mount Lemmon	Mount Lemmon Survey	EUN	920 m	MPC · JPL
825442	2018 BW_{23}	—	April 18, 2015	Cerro Tololo	DECam	·	480 m	MPC · JPL
825443	2018 BE_{24}	—	August 24, 2011	Siding Spring	SSS	H	400 m	MPC · JPL
825444	2018 BG_{25}	—	January 20, 2018	Haleakala	Pan-STARRS 1	·	1.0 km	MPC · JPL
825445	2018 BC_{29}	—	January 16, 2018	Haleakala	Pan-STARRS 1	EMA	2.0 km	MPC · JPL
825446	2018 BE_{31}	—	January 20, 2018	Haleakala	Pan-STARRS 1	VER	2.0 km	MPC · JPL
825447	2018 BT_{31}	—	January 16, 2018	Haleakala	Pan-STARRS 1	·	1.7 km	MPC · JPL
825448	2018 BX_{33}	—	January 20, 2018	Haleakala	Pan-STARRS 1	·	2.3 km	MPC · JPL
825449	2018 BA_{39}	—	January 23, 2018	Mount Lemmon	Mount Lemmon Survey	·	970 m	MPC · JPL
825450	2018 BC_{39}	—	January 24, 2018	Mount Lemmon	Mount Lemmon Survey	·	1.9 km	MPC · JPL
825451	2018 BR_{39}	—	May 11, 2015	Mount Lemmon	Mount Lemmon Survey	·	470 m	MPC · JPL
825452	2018 BT_{40}	—	January 16, 2018	Haleakala	Pan-STARRS 1	·	2.3 km	MPC · JPL
825453	2018 BS_{43}	—	January 20, 2018	Mount Lemmon	Mount Lemmon Survey	PHO	650 m	MPC · JPL
825454	2018 CT_{6}	—	December 29, 2017	Mount Lemmon	Mount Lemmon Survey	H	460 m	MPC · JPL
825455	2018 CG_{7}	—	January 29, 2014	Kitt Peak	Spacewatch	·	1.1 km	MPC · JPL
825456	2018 CK_{9}	—	October 2, 2016	Mount Lemmon	Mount Lemmon Survey	·	1.2 km	MPC · JPL
825457	2018 CD_{11}	—	January 15, 2018	Haleakala	Pan-STARRS 1	·	1.0 km	MPC · JPL
825458	2018 CG_{15}	—	August 19, 2012	ESA OGS	ESA OGS	PHO	690 m	MPC · JPL
825459	2018 CF_{18}	—	February 11, 2018	Haleakala	Pan-STARRS 1	EOS	1.4 km	MPC · JPL
825460	2018 CF_{22}	—	April 21, 2015	Cerro Tololo	DECam	·	540 m	MPC · JPL
825461	2018 CG_{22}	—	May 20, 2015	Cerro Tololo	DECam	·	630 m	MPC · JPL
825462	2018 CY_{22}	—	February 11, 2018	Haleakala	Pan-STARRS 1	·	590 m	MPC · JPL
825463	2018 CC_{24}	—	February 12, 2018	Haleakala	Pan-STARRS 1	·	480 m	MPC · JPL
825464	2018 CD_{24}	—	February 12, 2018	Haleakala	Pan-STARRS 1	·	890 m	MPC · JPL
825465	2018 CL_{24}	—	May 21, 2015	Haleakala	Pan-STARRS 1	·	710 m	MPC · JPL
825466	2018 CO_{24}	—	February 11, 2018	Haleakala	Pan-STARRS 1	·	620 m	MPC · JPL
825467	2018 CQ_{24}	—	February 12, 2018	Haleakala	Pan-STARRS 1	·	870 m	MPC · JPL
825468	2018 CZ_{24}	—	February 12, 2018	Haleakala	Pan-STARRS 1	·	730 m	MPC · JPL
825469	2018 CD_{25}	—	February 12, 2018	Haleakala	Pan-STARRS 1	·	520 m	MPC · JPL
825470	2018 CT_{25}	—	February 5, 2018	Mount Lemmon	Mount Lemmon Survey	EUP	2.4 km	MPC · JPL
825471	2018 CH_{26}	—	February 12, 2018	Haleakala	Pan-STARRS 1	·	2.1 km	MPC · JPL
825472	2018 CS_{26}	—	February 10, 2018	Haleakala	Pan-STARRS 1	V	460 m	MPC · JPL
825473	2018 CM_{29}	—	February 11, 2018	Haleakala	Pan-STARRS 1	·	580 m	MPC · JPL
825474	2018 CB_{42}	—	February 11, 2018	Mount Lemmon	Mount Lemmon Survey	·	3.0 km	MPC · JPL
825475	2018 DQ_{6}	—	February 26, 2011	Mount Lemmon	Mount Lemmon Survey	·	610 m	MPC · JPL
825476	2018 DP_{7}	—	May 20, 2015	Cerro Tololo	DECam	NYS	740 m	MPC · JPL
825477	2018 DU_{7}	—	February 22, 2018	Mount Lemmon	Mount Lemmon Survey	·	660 m	MPC · JPL
825478	2018 DZ_{7}	—	February 25, 2018	Mount Lemmon	Mount Lemmon Survey	·	3.2 km	MPC · JPL
825479	2018 DO_{8}	—	May 21, 2015	Cerro Tololo	DECam	(2076)	520 m	MPC · JPL
825480	2018 DS_{8}	—	September 12, 2016	Haleakala	Pan-STARRS 1	V	450 m	MPC · JPL
825481	2018 DX_{8}	—	February 21, 2018	Haleakala	Pan-STARRS 1	ERI	900 m	MPC · JPL
825482	2018 DL_{9}	—	February 26, 2018	Mount Lemmon	Mount Lemmon Survey	NYS	700 m	MPC · JPL
825483	2018 DN_{9}	—	February 22, 2018	Mount Lemmon	Mount Lemmon Survey	·	520 m	MPC · JPL
825484	2018 DQ_{13}	—	February 20, 2018	Haleakala	Pan-STARRS 1	·	740 m	MPC · JPL
825485	2018 DR_{13}	—	February 21, 2018	Haleakala	Pan-STARRS 1	·	820 m	MPC · JPL
825486	2018 EE_{4}	—	March 10, 2018	Haleakala	Pan-STARRS 1	AMO	290 m	MPC · JPL
825487	2018 EE_{10}	—	March 11, 2018	Haleakala	Pan-STARRS 1	·	570 m	MPC · JPL
825488	2018 EM_{10}	—	October 24, 2009	Kitt Peak	Spacewatch	·	560 m	MPC · JPL
825489	2018 EZ_{10}	—	March 10, 2018	Haleakala	Pan-STARRS 1	·	770 m	MPC · JPL
825490	2018 EC_{11}	—	March 10, 2018	Haleakala	Pan-STARRS 1	·	750 m	MPC · JPL
825491	2018 ET_{11}	—	March 7, 2018	Haleakala	Pan-STARRS 1	·	2.2 km	MPC · JPL
825492	2018 EH_{12}	—	March 10, 2018	Haleakala	Pan-STARRS 1	MAR	740 m	MPC · JPL
825493	2018 EU_{12}	—	May 22, 2015	Cerro Tololo	DECam	·	410 m	MPC · JPL
825494	2018 EW_{12}	—	January 29, 2011	Kitt Peak	Spacewatch	·	430 m	MPC · JPL
825495	2018 ED_{14}	—	May 13, 2015	Mount Lemmon	Mount Lemmon Survey	·	490 m	MPC · JPL
825496	2018 EU_{15}	—	March 10, 2018	Haleakala	Pan-STARRS 1	V	420 m	MPC · JPL
825497	2018 EP_{23}	—	August 10, 2015	Haleakala	Pan-STARRS 1	·	920 m	MPC · JPL
825498	2018 FC_{5}	—	March 9, 2007	Mount Lemmon	Mount Lemmon Survey	H	390 m	MPC · JPL
825499	2018 FE_{12}	—	June 23, 2015	Haleakala	Pan-STARRS 1	·	940 m	MPC · JPL
825500	2018 FW_{12}	—	September 24, 2008	Mount Lemmon	Mount Lemmon Survey	(5)	900 m	MPC · JPL

== 825501–825600 ==
back to top

Designation			Discovery			Properties		Ref
Permanent	Provisional	Named after	Date	Site	Discoverer(s)	Category	Diam.	Ref
825501	2018 FY_{17}	—	March 15, 2004	Kitt Peak	Spacewatch	·	1.7 km	MPC · JPL
825502	2018 FZ_{17}	—	March 31, 2015	Haleakala	Pan-STARRS 1	·	500 m	MPC · JPL
825503	2018 FH_{18}	—	April 23, 2015	Haleakala	Pan-STARRS 1	·	460 m	MPC · JPL
825504	2018 FO_{18}	—	March 2, 2011	Kitt Peak	Spacewatch	·	660 m	MPC · JPL
825505	2018 FA_{20}	—	March 2, 2011	Kitt Peak	Spacewatch	V	490 m	MPC · JPL
825506	2018 FB_{22}	—	October 24, 2005	Kitt Peak	Spacewatch	·	850 m	MPC · JPL
825507	2018 FT_{22}	—	April 3, 2009	Cerro Burek	I. de la Cueva	·	1.7 km	MPC · JPL
825508	2018 FU_{23}	—	January 20, 2017	Haleakala	Pan-STARRS 1	·	2.2 km	MPC · JPL
825509	2018 FC_{25}	—	August 27, 2016	Haleakala	Pan-STARRS 1	(1547)	1.3 km	MPC · JPL
825510	2018 FD_{25}	—	April 4, 2008	Mount Lemmon	Mount Lemmon Survey	(883)	510 m	MPC · JPL
825511	2018 FF_{29}	—	May 7, 2006	Mount Lemmon	Mount Lemmon Survey	·	770 m	MPC · JPL
825512	2018 FY_{29}	—	March 18, 2018	Haleakala	Pan-STARRS 1	·	640 m	MPC · JPL
825513	2018 FY_{31}	—	March 16, 2018	Mount Lemmon	Mount Lemmon Survey	PHO	810 m	MPC · JPL
825514	2018 FE_{32}	—	March 17, 2018	Haleakala	Pan-STARRS 1	EUP	2.6 km	MPC · JPL
825515	2018 FL_{32}	—	March 17, 2018	Mount Lemmon	Mount Lemmon Survey	·	560 m	MPC · JPL
825516	2018 FY_{32}	—	January 3, 2011	Mount Lemmon	Mount Lemmon Survey	·	440 m	MPC · JPL
825517	2018 FN_{34}	—	March 18, 2018	Haleakala	Pan-STARRS 1	·	480 m	MPC · JPL
825518	2018 FP_{34}	—	March 20, 2018	Mount Lemmon	Mount Lemmon Survey	·	530 m	MPC · JPL
825519	2018 FZ_{34}	—	March 17, 2018	Haleakala	Pan-STARRS 1	·	840 m	MPC · JPL
825520	2018 FR_{35}	—	March 17, 2018	Haleakala	Pan-STARRS 1	(2076)	630 m	MPC · JPL
825521	2018 FT_{36}	—	July 1, 2014	Haleakala	Pan-STARRS 1	·	1.8 km	MPC · JPL
825522	2018 FH_{39}	—	March 16, 2018	Mount Lemmon	Mount Lemmon Survey	·	810 m	MPC · JPL
825523	2018 FF_{40}	—	March 18, 2018	Mount Lemmon	Mount Lemmon Survey	·	500 m	MPC · JPL
825524	2018 FN_{40}	—	March 17, 2018	Mount Lemmon	Mount Lemmon Survey	TIR	2.4 km	MPC · JPL
825525	2018 FF_{41}	—	March 18, 2018	Haleakala	Pan-STARRS 1	·	550 m	MPC · JPL
825526	2018 FJ_{41}	—	October 6, 2016	Haleakala	Pan-STARRS 1	·	870 m	MPC · JPL
825527	2018 FL_{44}	—	March 17, 2018	Mount Lemmon	Mount Lemmon Survey	·	940 m	MPC · JPL
825528	2018 FQ_{45}	—	March 18, 2018	Mount Lemmon	Mount Lemmon Survey	PHO	680 m	MPC · JPL
825529	2018 FP_{46}	—	March 27, 2018	Mount Lemmon	Mount Lemmon Survey	·	580 m	MPC · JPL
825530	2018 FN_{52}	—	September 2, 2008	Kitt Peak	Spacewatch	·	720 m	MPC · JPL
825531	2018 FS_{59}	—	March 17, 2018	Haleakala	Pan-STARRS 1	·	570 m	MPC · JPL
825532	2018 FJ_{62}	—	March 18, 2018	Haleakala	Pan-STARRS 1	·	2.4 km	MPC · JPL
825533	2018 GT	—	November 28, 2014	Haleakala	Pan-STARRS 1	H	370 m	MPC · JPL
825534	2018 GK_{6}	—	March 13, 2010	Kitt Peak	Spacewatch	·	730 m	MPC · JPL
825535	2018 GQ_{7}	—	September 3, 2008	Kitt Peak	Spacewatch	·	750 m	MPC · JPL
825536	2018 GV_{9}	—	June 7, 2016	Haleakala	Pan-STARRS 1	H	420 m	MPC · JPL
825537	2018 GY_{9}	—	March 14, 2004	Kitt Peak	Spacewatch	·	530 m	MPC · JPL
825538	2018 GU_{10}	—	March 14, 2007	Mount Lemmon	Mount Lemmon Survey	·	830 m	MPC · JPL
825539	2018 GV_{10}	—	April 15, 2010	Mount Lemmon	Mount Lemmon Survey	·	860 m	MPC · JPL
825540	2018 GG_{11}	—	March 29, 2014	Mount Lemmon	Mount Lemmon Survey	·	940 m	MPC · JPL
825541	2018 GE_{13}	—	April 12, 2018	Mount Lemmon	Mount Lemmon Survey	·	1.2 km	MPC · JPL
825542	2018 GZ_{14}	—	April 12, 2018	Haleakala	Pan-STARRS 1	·	740 m	MPC · JPL
825543	2018 GD_{16}	—	April 10, 2018	Mount Lemmon	Mount Lemmon Survey	H	320 m	MPC · JPL
825544	2018 GE_{16}	—	April 11, 2018	Kitt Peak	Spacewatch	·	610 m	MPC · JPL
825545	2018 GO_{17}	—	October 9, 2016	Haleakala	Pan-STARRS 1	·	1.4 km	MPC · JPL
825546	2018 GT_{18}	—	April 13, 2018	Haleakala	Pan-STARRS 1	·	1.5 km	MPC · JPL
825547	2018 GJ_{19}	—	April 13, 2018	Haleakala	Pan-STARRS 1	·	550 m	MPC · JPL
825548	2018 GJ_{20}	—	April 13, 2018	Haleakala	Pan-STARRS 1	·	820 m	MPC · JPL
825549	2018 GP_{21}	—	April 13, 2018	Haleakala	Pan-STARRS 1	PHO	490 m	MPC · JPL
825550	2018 GY_{23}	—	September 19, 1998	Sacramento Peak	SDSS	·	540 m	MPC · JPL
825551	2018 GB_{27}	—	April 12, 2018	Mount Lemmon	Mount Lemmon Survey	·	590 m	MPC · JPL
825552	2018 HD_{3}	—	April 18, 2007	Kitt Peak	Spacewatch	MAS	600 m	MPC · JPL
825553	2018 HG_{3}	—	September 29, 2005	Mount Lemmon	Mount Lemmon Survey	·	460 m	MPC · JPL
825554	2018 HK_{3}	—	April 16, 2018	Cerro Paranal	Gaia Ground Based Optical Tracking	·	1.1 km	MPC · JPL
825555	2018 HX_{4}	—	October 16, 2015	Kitt Peak	Spacewatch	·	2.6 km	MPC · JPL
825556	2018 HW_{7}	—	April 16, 2018	Haleakala	Pan-STARRS 1	·	590 m	MPC · JPL
825557	2018 HZ_{7}	—	April 23, 2018	Mount Lemmon	Mount Lemmon Survey	·	550 m	MPC · JPL
825558	2018 HD_{8}	—	April 16, 2018	Mount Lemmon	Mount Lemmon Survey	·	710 m	MPC · JPL
825559	2018 HF_{9}	—	April 23, 2018	Mount Lemmon	Mount Lemmon Survey	·	640 m	MPC · JPL
825560	2018 HK_{9}	—	April 16, 2018	Mount Lemmon	Mount Lemmon Survey	H	380 m	MPC · JPL
825561	2018 HA_{11}	—	April 19, 2018	Mount Lemmon	Mount Lemmon Survey	·	640 m	MPC · JPL
825562	2018 JR_{2}	—	July 15, 2016	Mount Lemmon	Mount Lemmon Survey	H	410 m	MPC · JPL
825563	2018 JD_{3}	—	October 10, 2016	Haleakala	Pan-STARRS 1	H	360 m	MPC · JPL
825564	2018 JL_{8}	—	April 13, 2018	Haleakala	Pan-STARRS 1	·	730 m	MPC · JPL
825565	2018 JF_{11}	—	May 8, 2018	Catalina	CSS	·	830 m	MPC · JPL
825566	2018 JD_{13}	—	May 15, 2018	Mount Lemmon	Mount Lemmon Survey	·	660 m	MPC · JPL
825567	2018 KD	—	June 6, 2013	Mount Lemmon	Mount Lemmon Survey	H	430 m	MPC · JPL
825568	2018 KK_{8}	—	May 20, 2018	Haleakala	Pan-STARRS 1	·	730 m	MPC · JPL
825569	2018 KZ_{8}	—	May 20, 2018	Haleakala	Pan-STARRS 1	·	620 m	MPC · JPL
825570	2018 KY_{10}	—	May 19, 2018	Haleakala	Pan-STARRS 1	·	840 m	MPC · JPL
825571	2018 KY_{11}	—	May 21, 2018	Haleakala	Pan-STARRS 1	SYL	2.7 km	MPC · JPL
825572	2018 KE_{12}	—	May 18, 2018	Mount Lemmon	Mount Lemmon Survey	·	640 m	MPC · JPL
825573	2018 KQ_{12}	—	May 18, 2018	Mount Lemmon	Mount Lemmon Survey	NYS	820 m	MPC · JPL
825574	2018 KE_{13}	—	May 20, 2018	Haleakala	Pan-STARRS 1	V	420 m	MPC · JPL
825575	2018 KR_{14}	—	May 20, 2018	Haleakala	Pan-STARRS 1	·	2.4 km	MPC · JPL
825576	2018 KM_{18}	—	May 8, 2011	Mayhill	L. Elenin	·	560 m	MPC · JPL
825577	2018 LS_{1}	—	February 23, 2004	Socorro	LINEAR	PHO	690 m	MPC · JPL
825578	2018 LE_{2}	—	April 5, 2014	Haleakala	Pan-STARRS 1	·	940 m	MPC · JPL
825579	2018 LM_{6}	—	July 23, 2015	Haleakala	Pan-STARRS 1	·	490 m	MPC · JPL
825580	2018 LY_{7}	—	July 23, 2015	Haleakala	Pan-STARRS 1	·	520 m	MPC · JPL
825581	2018 LT_{10}	—	May 23, 2011	Mount Lemmon	Mount Lemmon Survey	·	620 m	MPC · JPL
825582	2018 LN_{15}	—	January 17, 2007	Kitt Peak	Spacewatch	H	360 m	MPC · JPL
825583	2018 LY_{17}	—	September 14, 2007	Tucson	R. A. Tucker	·	830 m	MPC · JPL
825584	2018 LK_{19}	—	June 10, 2018	Haleakala	Pan-STARRS 1	·	540 m	MPC · JPL
825585	2018 LF_{20}	—	June 12, 2018	Haleakala	Pan-STARRS 1	H	380 m	MPC · JPL
825586	2018 LC_{26}	—	June 8, 2018	Haleakala	Pan-STARRS 1	PHO	800 m	MPC · JPL
825587	2018 LD_{26}	—	June 6, 2018	Haleakala	Pan-STARRS 1	V	410 m	MPC · JPL
825588	2018 LD_{29}	—	June 2, 2018	Mount Lemmon	Mount Lemmon Survey	·	520 m	MPC · JPL
825589	2018 LE_{29}	—	June 15, 2018	Haleakala	Pan-STARRS 1	·	770 m	MPC · JPL
825590	2018 LL_{29}	—	June 5, 2018	Haleakala	Pan-STARRS 1	·	430 m	MPC · JPL
825591	2018 LN_{29}	—	June 14, 2018	Haleakala	Pan-STARRS 2	H	380 m	MPC · JPL
825592	2018 LJ_{30}	—	June 6, 2018	Haleakala	Pan-STARRS 1	V	450 m	MPC · JPL
825593	2018 LA_{32}	—	June 15, 2018	Haleakala	Pan-STARRS 1	·	830 m	MPC · JPL
825594	2018 LQ_{32}	—	June 15, 2018	Haleakala	Pan-STARRS 1	V	490 m	MPC · JPL
825595	2018 LB_{34}	—	June 15, 2018	Haleakala	Pan-STARRS 1	·	830 m	MPC · JPL
825596	2018 LG_{35}	—	June 15, 2018	Haleakala	Pan-STARRS 1	NYS	730 m	MPC · JPL
825597	2018 LZ_{36}	—	June 6, 2018	Haleakala	Pan-STARRS 1	·	960 m	MPC · JPL
825598	2018 LX_{39}	—	April 21, 2009	Mount Lemmon	Mount Lemmon Survey	·	1.2 km	MPC · JPL
825599	2018 LH_{40}	—	June 15, 2018	Haleakala	Pan-STARRS 1	L4	6.5 km	MPC · JPL
825600	2018 LZ_{40}	—	June 15, 2018	Haleakala	Pan-STARRS 1	L4	5.5 km	MPC · JPL

== 825601–825700 ==
back to top

Designation			Discovery			Properties		Ref
Permanent	Provisional	Named after	Date	Site	Discoverer(s)	Category	Diam.	Ref
825601	2018 LJ_{55}	—	June 6, 2018	Haleakala	Pan-STARRS 1	·	780 m	MPC · JPL
825602	2018 ME_{3}	—	October 13, 2015	Kitt Peak	Spacewatch	NYS	950 m	MPC · JPL
825603	2018 MZ_{3}	—	July 29, 2014	Haleakala	Pan-STARRS 1	·	1.1 km	MPC · JPL
825604	2018 MS_{5}	—	September 26, 2011	Haleakala	Pan-STARRS 1	NYS	810 m	MPC · JPL
825605	2018 ML_{10}	—	June 18, 2018	Haleakala	Pan-STARRS 1	MAS	590 m	MPC · JPL
825606	2018 MQ_{11}	—	June 17, 2018	Haleakala	Pan-STARRS 1	·	1.0 km	MPC · JPL
825607	2018 MZ_{14}	—	April 30, 2014	Haleakala	Pan-STARRS 1	·	690 m	MPC · JPL
825608	2018 MT_{15}	—	June 17, 2018	Haleakala	Pan-STARRS 1	H	360 m	MPC · JPL
825609	2018 MX_{16}	—	June 24, 2018	Haleakala	Pan-STARRS 1	·	2.2 km	MPC · JPL
825610	2018 MP_{17}	—	June 18, 2018	Haleakala	Pan-STARRS 1	L4	6.8 km	MPC · JPL
825611	2018 MN_{18}	—	June 18, 2018	Haleakala	Pan-STARRS 1	·	1 km	MPC · JPL
825612	2018 MS_{18}	—	April 23, 2014	Mount Lemmon	Mount Lemmon Survey	PHO	710 m	MPC · JPL
825613	2018 MV_{20}	—	June 18, 2018	Haleakala	Pan-STARRS 1	MAS	560 m	MPC · JPL
825614	2018 MN_{21}	—	December 9, 2015	Haleakala	Pan-STARRS 1	·	540 m	MPC · JPL
825615	2018 MP_{21}	—	June 23, 2018	Haleakala	Pan-STARRS 1	·	990 m	MPC · JPL
825616	2018 MO_{22}	—	June 18, 2018	Haleakala	Pan-STARRS 1	·	1.0 km	MPC · JPL
825617	2018 MX_{22}	—	June 18, 2018	Haleakala	Pan-STARRS 1	·	870 m	MPC · JPL
825618	2018 MZ_{22}	—	June 18, 2018	Haleakala	Pan-STARRS 1	·	850 m	MPC · JPL
825619	2018 MW_{23}	—	May 6, 2014	Haleakala	Pan-STARRS 1	V	450 m	MPC · JPL
825620	2018 ME_{25}	—	June 21, 2018	Haleakala	Pan-STARRS 1	EOS	1.6 km	MPC · JPL
825621	2018 MQ_{26}	—	April 28, 2014	Haleakala	Pan-STARRS 1	·	670 m	MPC · JPL
825622	2018 MT_{30}	—	June 18, 2018	Palomar Mountain	Zwicky Transient Facility	·	700 m	MPC · JPL
825623	2018 MD_{31}	—	November 15, 2015	Haleakala	Pan-STARRS 1	·	810 m	MPC · JPL
825624	2018 MP_{35}	—	June 22, 2018	Haleakala	Pan-STARRS 1	·	990 m	MPC · JPL
825625	2018 NL_{2}	—	January 27, 2007	Kitt Peak	Spacewatch	H	420 m	MPC · JPL
825626	2018 NG_{3}	—	December 29, 2014	Mount Lemmon	Mount Lemmon Survey	H	410 m	MPC · JPL
825627	2018 NM_{7}	—	February 27, 2006	Kitt Peak	Spacewatch	(895)	3.1 km	MPC · JPL
825628	2018 NA_{11}	—	August 3, 2014	Haleakala	Pan-STARRS 1	·	1.5 km	MPC · JPL
825629	2018 NP_{13}	—	November 7, 2008	Mount Lemmon	Mount Lemmon Survey	·	600 m	MPC · JPL
825630	2018 NO_{15}	—	November 27, 2010	Mount Lemmon	Mount Lemmon Survey	·	1.6 km	MPC · JPL
825631	2018 NL_{16}	—	July 11, 2018	Haleakala	Pan-STARRS 1	·	790 m	MPC · JPL
825632	2018 NE_{18}	—	July 8, 2018	Haleakala	Pan-STARRS 1	NYS	730 m	MPC · JPL
825633	2018 NK_{20}	—	July 12, 2018	Haleakala	Pan-STARRS 1	·	940 m	MPC · JPL
825634	2018 NP_{22}	—	July 13, 2018	Haleakala	Pan-STARRS 1	·	1.9 km	MPC · JPL
825635	2018 NX_{25}	—	July 9, 2018	Haleakala	Pan-STARRS 1	·	830 m	MPC · JPL
825636	2018 NF_{29}	—	July 9, 2018	Haleakala	Pan-STARRS 1	·	940 m	MPC · JPL
825637	2018 ND_{30}	—	July 10, 2018	Haleakala	Pan-STARRS 1	·	810 m	MPC · JPL
825638	2018 NT_{30}	—	July 13, 2018	Haleakala	Pan-STARRS 1	·	800 m	MPC · JPL
825639	2018 NF_{35}	—	May 23, 2014	Haleakala	Pan-STARRS 1	·	680 m	MPC · JPL
825640	2018 NB_{36}	—	March 28, 2016	Cerro Tololo	DECam	·	2.3 km	MPC · JPL
825641	2018 NJ_{36}	—	July 9, 2018	Haleakala	Pan-STARRS 1	·	2.5 km	MPC · JPL
825642	2018 NM_{38}	—	April 8, 2010	WISE	WISE	·	2.1 km	MPC · JPL
825643	2018 NR_{38}	—	July 8, 2018	Haleakala	Pan-STARRS 1	·	770 m	MPC · JPL
825644	2018 NS_{41}	—	April 18, 2015	Cerro Tololo	DECam	L4	5.2 km	MPC · JPL
825645	2018 NE_{44}	—	July 13, 2018	Haleakala	Pan-STARRS 2	NYS	780 m	MPC · JPL
825646	2018 NV_{44}	—	March 13, 2016	Haleakala	Pan-STARRS 1	·	2.4 km	MPC · JPL
825647	2018 NY_{48}	—	July 9, 2018	Haleakala	Pan-STARRS 1	·	1.2 km	MPC · JPL
825648	2018 NF_{49}	—	July 13, 2018	Haleakala	Pan-STARRS 1	·	950 m	MPC · JPL
825649	2018 NN_{50}	—	September 12, 2007	Kitt Peak	Spacewatch	MAS	510 m	MPC · JPL
825650	2018 OY_{1}	—	October 10, 2015	Haleakala	Pan-STARRS 1	·	660 m	MPC · JPL
825651	2018 OD_{3}	—	July 16, 2018	Haleakala	Pan-STARRS 2	·	1.7 km	MPC · JPL
825652	2018 OR_{3}	—	August 28, 2014	Haleakala	Pan-STARRS 1	·	1.1 km	MPC · JPL
825653	2018 PB	—	June 8, 2011	Haleakala	Pan-STARRS 1	·	1.0 km	MPC · JPL
825654	2018 PG_{3}	—	July 9, 2018	Haleakala	Pan-STARRS 1	·	940 m	MPC · JPL
825655	2018 PF_{4}	—	March 3, 2009	Kitt Peak	Spacewatch	·	660 m	MPC · JPL
825656	2018 PG_{11}	—	May 21, 2014	Haleakala	Pan-STARRS 1	MAS	450 m	MPC · JPL
825657	2018 PM_{12}	—	May 6, 2014	Mount Lemmon	Mount Lemmon Survey	·	640 m	MPC · JPL
825658	2018 PS_{21}	—	January 26, 2015	Haleakala	Pan-STARRS 1	H	230 m	MPC · JPL
825659	2018 PU_{22}	—	December 25, 2016	Haleakala	Pan-STARRS 1	H	350 m	MPC · JPL
825660	2018 PE_{25}	—	June 23, 2014	Kitt Peak	Spacewatch	PHO	800 m	MPC · JPL
825661	2018 PJ_{28}	—	October 16, 2007	Catalina	CSS	·	2.9 km	MPC · JPL
825662	2018 PK_{29}	—	December 23, 2012	Haleakala	Pan-STARRS 1	NYS	890 m	MPC · JPL
825663	2018 PJ_{33}	—	August 11, 2018	Haleakala	Pan-STARRS 1	V	440 m	MPC · JPL
825664	2018 PK_{33}	—	August 11, 2018	Haleakala	Pan-STARRS 1	·	2.0 km	MPC · JPL
825665	2018 PC_{42}	—	August 12, 2018	Haleakala	Pan-STARRS 1	H	320 m	MPC · JPL
825666	2018 PS_{43}	—	August 11, 2018	Haleakala	Pan-STARRS 1	·	820 m	MPC · JPL
825667	2018 PS_{44}	—	August 11, 2018	Haleakala	Pan-STARRS 1	·	770 m	MPC · JPL
825668	2018 PO_{46}	—	March 28, 2016	Cerro Tololo	DECam	·	2.1 km	MPC · JPL
825669	2018 PC_{47}	—	August 8, 2018	Haleakala	Pan-STARRS 1	·	720 m	MPC · JPL
825670	2018 PW_{50}	—	August 7, 2018	Haleakala	Pan-STARRS 1	L4	7.1 km	MPC · JPL
825671	2018 PK_{52}	—	August 6, 2018	Haleakala	Pan-STARRS 1	LIX	2.5 km	MPC · JPL
825672	2018 PP_{59}	—	August 7, 2018	Haleakala	Pan-STARRS 1	·	1.6 km	MPC · JPL
825673	2018 PV_{60}	—	June 27, 2014	Haleakala	Pan-STARRS 1	·	900 m	MPC · JPL
825674	2018 PM_{63}	—	August 13, 2018	Haleakala	Pan-STARRS 1	VER	2.0 km	MPC · JPL
825675	2018 PU_{64}	—	March 12, 2016	Haleakala	Pan-STARRS 1	·	2.3 km	MPC · JPL
825676	2018 PW_{76}	—	January 27, 2006	Kitt Peak	Spacewatch	·	470 m	MPC · JPL
825677	2018 PS_{80}	—	April 23, 2017	Mount Lemmon	Mount Lemmon Survey	·	1.8 km	MPC · JPL
825678	2018 PU_{93}	—	August 7, 2018	Haleakala	Pan-STARRS 1	·	890 m	MPC · JPL
825679	2018 QW_{2}	—	August 13, 2012	Haleakala	Pan-STARRS 1	·	2.1 km	MPC · JPL
825680	2018 QM_{4}	—	January 26, 2015	Haleakala	Pan-STARRS 1	·	2.1 km	MPC · JPL
825681	2018 QW_{4}	—	July 7, 2018	Mount Lemmon	Mount Lemmon Survey	PHO	700 m	MPC · JPL
825682	2018 QD_{7}	—	May 5, 2010	Mount Lemmon	Mount Lemmon Survey	·	790 m	MPC · JPL
825683	2018 QG_{7}	—	October 9, 2007	Kitt Peak	Spacewatch	·	2.1 km	MPC · JPL
825684	2018 QT_{8}	—	August 18, 2018	Haleakala	Pan-STARRS 1	·	2.2 km	MPC · JPL
825685	2018 QF_{14}	—	August 22, 2018	Haleakala	Pan-STARRS 1	·	1.5 km	MPC · JPL
825686	2018 QR_{15}	—	August 17, 2018	Haleakala	Pan-STARRS 1	·	840 m	MPC · JPL
825687	2018 QS_{15}	—	August 22, 2018	Haleakala	Pan-STARRS 1	·	790 m	MPC · JPL
825688	2018 QU_{15}	—	August 18, 2018	Haleakala	Pan-STARRS 1	·	750 m	MPC · JPL
825689	2018 QQ_{16}	—	August 22, 2018	Haleakala	Pan-STARRS 1	·	1 km	MPC · JPL
825690	2018 RP_{14}	—	May 5, 2014	Mount Lemmon	Mount Lemmon Survey	·	700 m	MPC · JPL
825691	2018 RT_{17}	—	October 3, 2003	Kitt Peak	Spacewatch	·	850 m	MPC · JPL
825692	2018 RD_{20}	—	September 4, 2011	Haleakala	Pan-STARRS 1	·	720 m	MPC · JPL
825693	2018 RE_{20}	—	December 13, 2015	Haleakala	Pan-STARRS 1	·	900 m	MPC · JPL
825694	2018 RZ_{21}	—	October 11, 2004	Kitt Peak	Spacewatch	·	620 m	MPC · JPL
825695	2018 RQ_{22}	—	August 31, 2011	Haleakala	Pan-STARRS 1	·	530 m	MPC · JPL
825696	2018 RK_{26}	—	May 7, 2014	Haleakala	Pan-STARRS 1	·	670 m	MPC · JPL
825697	2018 RE_{28}	—	November 8, 2007	Catalina	CSS	·	1.0 km	MPC · JPL
825698	2018 RZ_{28}	—	October 4, 2013	Mount Lemmon	Mount Lemmon Survey	·	1.5 km	MPC · JPL
825699	2018 RA_{29}	—	September 20, 2003	Kitt Peak	Spacewatch	·	710 m	MPC · JPL
825700	2018 RA_{31}	—	June 27, 2015	Haleakala	Pan-STARRS 1	H	360 m	MPC · JPL

== 825701–825800 ==
back to top

Designation			Discovery			Properties		Ref
Permanent	Provisional	Named after	Date	Site	Discoverer(s)	Category	Diam.	Ref
825701	2018 RF_{32}	—	September 21, 2011	Kitt Peak	Spacewatch	·	810 m	MPC · JPL
825702	2018 RR_{33}	—	October 28, 2011	Mount Lemmon	Mount Lemmon Survey	·	660 m	MPC · JPL
825703	2018 RY_{33}	—	July 28, 2014	Haleakala	Pan-STARRS 1	NYS	890 m	MPC · JPL
825704	2018 RY_{34}	—	October 23, 2011	Haleakala	Pan-STARRS 1	·	690 m	MPC · JPL
825705	2018 RB_{37}	—	November 18, 2011	Mount Lemmon	Mount Lemmon Survey	·	750 m	MPC · JPL
825706	2018 RG_{38}	—	September 20, 2003	Palomar	NEAT	·	930 m	MPC · JPL
825707	2018 RE_{39}	—	September 11, 2018	Mount Lemmon	Mount Lemmon Survey	·	1.8 km	MPC · JPL
825708	2018 RL_{42}	—	September 21, 2009	Mount Lemmon	Mount Lemmon Survey	·	1.1 km	MPC · JPL
825709	2018 RA_{45}	—	November 12, 2013	Mount Lemmon	Mount Lemmon Survey	·	1.4 km	MPC · JPL
825710	2018 RL_{45}	—	September 12, 2018	Mount Lemmon	Mount Lemmon Survey	·	1.7 km	MPC · JPL
825711	2018 RB_{46}	—	September 1, 2013	Haleakala	Pan-STARRS 1	·	1.8 km	MPC · JPL
825712	2018 RD_{49}	—	September 15, 2018	Mount Lemmon	Mount Lemmon Survey	H	360 m	MPC · JPL
825713	2018 RH_{49}	—	September 13, 2018	Mount Lemmon	Mount Lemmon Survey	H	390 m	MPC · JPL
825714	2018 RL_{49}	—	September 12, 2018	Mount Lemmon	Mount Lemmon Survey	·	2.8 km	MPC · JPL
825715	2018 RA_{50}	—	September 9, 2018	Mount Lemmon	Mount Lemmon Survey	·	770 m	MPC · JPL
825716	2018 RN_{50}	—	September 13, 2018	Mount Lemmon	Mount Lemmon Survey	·	580 m	MPC · JPL
825717	2018 RU_{56}	—	September 14, 2018	Mount Lemmon	Mount Lemmon Survey	H	340 m	MPC · JPL
825718	2018 RV_{56}	—	September 11, 2018	Mount Lemmon	Mount Lemmon Survey	·	1.0 km	MPC · JPL
825719	2018 RT_{60}	—	April 20, 2015	Haleakala	Pan-STARRS 1	·	430 m	MPC · JPL
825720	2018 RO_{63}	—	December 16, 2014	Haleakala	Pan-STARRS 1	EUN	860 m	MPC · JPL
825721	2018 RU_{65}	—	April 20, 2017	Haleakala	Pan-STARRS 1	·	950 m	MPC · JPL
825722	2018 RH_{71}	—	October 22, 2014	Catalina	CSS	EUN	880 m	MPC · JPL
825723	2018 RX_{71}	—	June 23, 2014	Mount Lemmon	Mount Lemmon Survey	MAS	450 m	MPC · JPL
825724	2018 SZ_{4}	—	August 27, 2011	La Sagra	OAM	·	630 m	MPC · JPL
825725	2018 SK_{5}	—	November 17, 2011	Mount Lemmon	Mount Lemmon Survey	·	1.1 km	MPC · JPL
825726	2018 SR_{6}	—	November 18, 2009	Dauban	C. Rinner, Kugel, F.	·	1.3 km	MPC · JPL
825727	2018 SR_{7}	—	September 14, 2007	Catalina	CSS	·	900 m	MPC · JPL
825728	2018 SX_{13}	—	October 25, 2014	Mount Lemmon	Mount Lemmon Survey	·	1.1 km	MPC · JPL
825729	2018 SG_{18}	—	September 16, 2018	Mount Lemmon	Mount Lemmon Survey	PHO	810 m	MPC · JPL
825730	2018 SV_{18}	—	September 16, 2018	Mount Lemmon	Mount Lemmon Survey	EUP	2.8 km	MPC · JPL
825731	2018 TP_{6}	—	October 10, 2018	Mount Lemmon	Mount Lemmon Survey	H	330 m	MPC · JPL
825732	2018 TZ_{10}	—	August 19, 2014	Haleakala	Pan-STARRS 1	PHO	620 m	MPC · JPL
825733	2018 TL_{15}	—	October 3, 2018	Haleakala	Pan-STARRS 2	H	450 m	MPC · JPL
825734	2018 TG_{16}	—	October 5, 2018	Mount Lemmon	Mount Lemmon Survey	·	580 m	MPC · JPL
825735	2018 TS_{17}	—	October 4, 2018	Haleakala	Pan-STARRS 2	·	1.7 km	MPC · JPL
825736	2018 TV_{20}	—	August 26, 2012	Haleakala	Pan-STARRS 1	·	1.9 km	MPC · JPL
825737	2018 TO_{21}	—	October 5, 2018	Haleakala	Pan-STARRS 2	·	1.3 km	MPC · JPL
825738	2018 TC_{25}	—	October 10, 2018	Haleakala	Pan-STARRS 2	H	330 m	MPC · JPL
825739	2018 TD_{25}	—	October 2, 2018	Haleakala	Pan-STARRS 2	PHO	810 m	MPC · JPL
825740	2018 TA_{27}	—	October 5, 2018	Haleakala	Pan-STARRS 2	TRE	2.0 km	MPC · JPL
825741	2018 TJ_{27}	—	October 5, 2018	Mount Lemmon	Mount Lemmon Survey	EOS	1.4 km	MPC · JPL
825742	2018 TQ_{32}	—	March 12, 2016	Haleakala	Pan-STARRS 1	EOS	1.5 km	MPC · JPL
825743	2018 TR_{33}	—	October 4, 2018	Haleakala	Pan-STARRS 2	·	970 m	MPC · JPL
825744	2018 TD_{34}	—	March 5, 2016	Haleakala	Pan-STARRS 1	EOS	1.7 km	MPC · JPL
825745	2018 TO_{34}	—	October 10, 2018	Mount Lemmon	Mount Lemmon Survey	·	2.3 km	MPC · JPL
825746	2018 TG_{35}	—	October 2, 2018	Haleakala	Pan-STARRS 2	·	670 m	MPC · JPL
825747	2018 TC_{36}	—	October 7, 2018	Mount Lemmon	Mount Lemmon Survey	PHO	720 m	MPC · JPL
825748	2018 TJ_{40}	—	April 30, 2016	Haleakala	Pan-STARRS 1	·	2.3 km	MPC · JPL
825749	2018 TK_{47}	—	March 30, 2016	Cerro Tololo	DECam	·	2.0 km	MPC · JPL
825750	2018 TM_{59}	—	October 5, 2018	Mount Lemmon	Mount Lemmon Survey	·	700 m	MPC · JPL
825751	2018 UV_{2}	—	January 20, 2006	Anderson Mesa	LONEOS	H	430 m	MPC · JPL
825752	2018 UZ_{2}	—	November 14, 2002	Palomar	NEAT	H	540 m	MPC · JPL
825753	2018 UQ_{8}	—	October 11, 2007	Mount Lemmon	Mount Lemmon Survey	·	900 m	MPC · JPL
825754	2018 UO_{11}	—	December 10, 2014	Mount Lemmon	Mount Lemmon Survey	·	1.3 km	MPC · JPL
825755	2018 UP_{13}	—	September 12, 2018	Mount Lemmon	Mount Lemmon Survey	EOS	1.6 km	MPC · JPL
825756	2018 UE_{14}	—	June 5, 2016	Roque de los Muchachos	EURONEAR	·	2.1 km	MPC · JPL
825757	2018 UL_{15}	—	October 29, 2000	Kitt Peak	Spacewatch	·	910 m	MPC · JPL
825758	2018 UC_{19}	—	October 22, 2018	Haleakala	Pan-STARRS 2	·	1.1 km	MPC · JPL
825759	2018 UL_{20}	—	October 21, 2018	Mount Lemmon	Mount Lemmon Survey	·	910 m	MPC · JPL
825760	2018 UP_{26}	—	October 21, 2018	Mount Lemmon	Mount Lemmon Survey	H	470 m	MPC · JPL
825761	2018 UB_{27}	—	October 17, 2018	Haleakala	Pan-STARRS 2	H	530 m	MPC · JPL
825762	2018 UD_{38}	—	October 16, 2018	Haleakala	Pan-STARRS 2	·	780 m	MPC · JPL
825763	2018 UT_{38}	—	May 1, 2016	Cerro Tololo	DECam	·	2.2 km	MPC · JPL
825764	2018 VT_{1}	—	April 3, 2017	Mount Lemmon	Mount Lemmon Survey	H	400 m	MPC · JPL
825765	2018 VQ_{4}	—	November 8, 2018	Mount Lemmon	Mount Lemmon Survey	H	240 m	MPC · JPL
825766	2018 VE_{6}	—	February 23, 2017	Mount Lemmon	Mount Lemmon Survey	H	380 m	MPC · JPL
825767	2018 VN_{9}	—	January 7, 2006	Catalina	CSS	·	780 m	MPC · JPL
825768	2018 VH_{11}	—	September 4, 2008	Kitt Peak	Spacewatch	·	1.4 km	MPC · JPL
825769	2018 VD_{12}	—	October 8, 2007	Mount Lemmon	Mount Lemmon Survey	·	2.1 km	MPC · JPL
825770	2018 VL_{13}	—	October 20, 2018	Mount Lemmon	Mount Lemmon Survey	H	310 m	MPC · JPL
825771	2018 VA_{15}	—	September 27, 2011	Mount Lemmon	Mount Lemmon Survey	·	760 m	MPC · JPL
825772	2018 VV_{18}	—	September 19, 2014	Haleakala	Pan-STARRS 1	·	830 m	MPC · JPL
825773	2018 VD_{20}	—	December 18, 2001	Socorro	LINEAR	T_{j} (2.97)	2.9 km	MPC · JPL
825774	2018 VM_{21}	—	March 13, 2016	Haleakala	Pan-STARRS 1	·	2.2 km	MPC · JPL
825775	2018 VY_{21}	—	April 30, 2016	Haleakala	Pan-STARRS 1	·	2.0 km	MPC · JPL
825776	2018 VP_{27}	—	September 18, 2015	ISON-SSO	L. Elenin	H	510 m	MPC · JPL
825777	2018 VO_{30}	—	April 28, 2014	Cerro Tololo	DECam	·	650 m	MPC · JPL
825778	2018 VT_{33}	—	January 7, 2016	Haleakala	Pan-STARRS 1	·	530 m	MPC · JPL
825779	2018 VB_{36}	—	December 17, 2007	Kitt Peak	Spacewatch	·	900 m	MPC · JPL
825780	2018 VK_{42}	—	February 10, 2016	Haleakala	Pan-STARRS 1	·	760 m	MPC · JPL
825781	2018 VS_{44}	—	March 20, 2015	Haleakala	Pan-STARRS 1	·	2.2 km	MPC · JPL
825782	2018 VF_{46}	—	November 14, 2010	Mount Lemmon	Mount Lemmon Survey	MAR	780 m	MPC · JPL
825783	2018 VQ_{51}	—	October 12, 2010	Mount Lemmon	Mount Lemmon Survey	3:2	4.1 km	MPC · JPL
825784	2018 VV_{58}	—	September 20, 2003	Kitt Peak	Spacewatch	·	730 m	MPC · JPL
825785	2018 VK_{66}	—	November 7, 2010	Mount Lemmon	Mount Lemmon Survey	(5)	980 m	MPC · JPL
825786	2018 VF_{67}	—	March 5, 2013	Mount Lemmon	Mount Lemmon Survey	·	1.0 km	MPC · JPL
825787	2018 VK_{71}	—	October 24, 2014	Kitt Peak	Spacewatch	·	780 m	MPC · JPL
825788	2018 VX_{71}	—	November 8, 2018	Haleakala	Pan-STARRS 2	EMA	2.3 km	MPC · JPL
825789	2018 VQ_{73}	—	October 22, 2014	Mount Lemmon	Mount Lemmon Survey	PHO	770 m	MPC · JPL
825790	2018 VB_{76}	—	September 9, 2018	Mount Lemmon	Mount Lemmon Survey	EUN	870 m	MPC · JPL
825791	2018 VG_{79}	—	November 26, 2014	Haleakala	Pan-STARRS 1	·	970 m	MPC · JPL
825792	2018 VO_{81}	—	November 26, 2014	Haleakala	Pan-STARRS 1	EUN	880 m	MPC · JPL
825793	2018 VB_{86}	—	September 15, 2007	Kitt Peak	Spacewatch	H	370 m	MPC · JPL
825794	2018 VP_{90}	—	January 20, 2009	Kitt Peak	Spacewatch	·	460 m	MPC · JPL
825795	2018 VS_{90}	—	November 12, 2015	Mount Lemmon	Mount Lemmon Survey	·	550 m	MPC · JPL
825796	2018 VB_{94}	—	September 18, 2010	Mount Lemmon	Mount Lemmon Survey	T_{j} (2.99) · 3:2 · SHU	3.8 km	MPC · JPL
825797	2018 VD_{94}	—	February 3, 2012	Haleakala	Pan-STARRS 1	·	730 m	MPC · JPL
825798	2018 VA_{98}	—	December 9, 2015	Mount Lemmon	Mount Lemmon Survey	·	540 m	MPC · JPL
825799	2018 VM_{100}	—	March 15, 2016	Haleakala	Pan-STARRS 1	ADE	1.7 km	MPC · JPL
825800	2018 VJ_{101}	—	April 25, 2017	Haleakala	Pan-STARRS 1	·	520 m	MPC · JPL

== 825801–825900 ==
back to top

Designation			Discovery			Properties		Ref
Permanent	Provisional	Named after	Date	Site	Discoverer(s)	Category	Diam.	Ref
825801	2018 VJ_{102}	—	September 29, 2011	Mount Lemmon	Mount Lemmon Survey	SYL	2.9 km	MPC · JPL
825802	2018 VL_{109}	—	August 10, 2005	Cerro Tololo	Deep Ecliptic Survey	·	800 m	MPC · JPL
825803	2018 VU_{111}	—	November 17, 2014	Haleakala	Pan-STARRS 1	MAR	650 m	MPC · JPL
825804	2018 VA_{116}	—	April 3, 2016	Mount Lemmon	Mount Lemmon Survey	·	1.0 km	MPC · JPL
825805	2018 VU_{116}	—	August 18, 2017	Haleakala	Pan-STARRS 1	·	2.5 km	MPC · JPL
825806	2018 VX_{116}	—	November 8, 2018	Mount Lemmon	Mount Lemmon Survey	EUN	700 m	MPC · JPL
825807	2018 VD_{117}	—	November 8, 2018	Mount Lemmon	Mount Lemmon Survey	HNS	820 m	MPC · JPL
825808	2018 VL_{117}	—	November 15, 2018	Mount Lemmon	Mount Lemmon Survey	H	410 m	MPC · JPL
825809	2018 VL_{124}	—	November 1, 2018	Roque de los Muchachos	EURONEAR	TIR	2.0 km	MPC · JPL
825810	2018 VE_{125}	—	November 7, 2018	Mount Lemmon	Mount Lemmon Survey	MAR	840 m	MPC · JPL
825811	2018 VS_{125}	—	November 5, 2018	Haleakala	Pan-STARRS 2	·	600 m	MPC · JPL
825812	2018 VY_{126}	—	October 10, 2018	Mount Lemmon	Mount Lemmon Survey	·	1.6 km	MPC · JPL
825813	2018 VN_{127}	—	June 5, 2013	Mount Lemmon	Mount Lemmon Survey	·	880 m	MPC · JPL
825814	2018 VU_{141}	—	November 10, 2018	Haleakala	Pan-STARRS 2	·	890 m	MPC · JPL
825815	2018 VL_{145}	—	November 7, 2018	Mount Lemmon	Mount Lemmon Survey	·	1.2 km	MPC · JPL
825816	2018 VL_{150}	—	May 23, 2014	Haleakala	Pan-STARRS 1	·	620 m	MPC · JPL
825817	2018 VW_{152}	—	November 2, 2018	Mount Lemmon	Mount Lemmon Survey	·	1.6 km	MPC · JPL
825818	2018 VL_{154}	—	November 8, 2018	Mount Lemmon	Mount Lemmon Survey	·	1.1 km	MPC · JPL
825819	2018 VT_{155}	—	November 6, 2018	Haleakala	Pan-STARRS 2	H	330 m	MPC · JPL
825820	2018 VN_{161}	—	November 5, 2018	Haleakala	Pan-STARRS 2	HNS	790 m	MPC · JPL
825821	2018 VB_{169}	—	November 8, 2018	Mount Lemmon	Mount Lemmon Survey	·	900 m	MPC · JPL
825822	2018 VF_{169}	—	December 5, 2010	Kitt Peak	Spacewatch	·	980 m	MPC · JPL
825823	2018 VR_{178}	—	November 6, 2018	Mount Lemmon	Mount Lemmon Survey	HNS	730 m	MPC · JPL
825824	2018 VJ_{193}	—	November 5, 2018	Haleakala	Pan-STARRS 2	HNS	840 m	MPC · JPL
825825	2018 WT	—	December 7, 2013	Haleakala	Pan-STARRS 1	H	350 m	MPC · JPL
825826	2018 WJ_{3}	—	September 19, 2003	Palomar	NEAT	·	1.8 km	MPC · JPL
825827	2018 WJ_{5}	—	November 17, 2018	Mount Lemmon	Mount Lemmon Survey	·	860 m	MPC · JPL
825828	2018 WN_{6}	—	November 17, 2018	Mount Lemmon	Mount Lemmon Survey	EOS	1.4 km	MPC · JPL
825829	2018 WH_{20}	—	November 29, 2018	Mount Lemmon	Mount Lemmon Survey	·	1.4 km	MPC · JPL
825830	2018 XZ	—	December 4, 2018	Mount Lemmon	Mount Lemmon Survey	H	350 m	MPC · JPL
825831	2018 XK_{3}	—	April 20, 2002	Palomar	NEAT	·	650 m	MPC · JPL
825832	2018 XO_{5}	—	December 12, 2018	Haleakala	Pan-STARRS 1	H	340 m	MPC · JPL
825833	2018 XP_{5}	—	April 25, 2017	Haleakala	Pan-STARRS 1	H	350 m	MPC · JPL
825834	2018 XW_{14}	—	December 20, 2014	Haleakala	Pan-STARRS 1	·	870 m	MPC · JPL
825835	2018 XL_{15}	—	November 26, 2014	Haleakala	Pan-STARRS 1	·	790 m	MPC · JPL
825836	2018 XA_{16}	—	September 13, 2007	Mount Lemmon	Mount Lemmon Survey	NYS	740 m	MPC · JPL
825837	2018 XO_{20}	—	December 10, 2018	Kitt Peak	Spacewatch	H	450 m	MPC · JPL
825838	2018 XU_{24}	—	December 14, 2018	Haleakala	Pan-STARRS 1	GAL	1.2 km	MPC · JPL
825839	2018 XY_{25}	—	December 4, 2018	Oukaïmeden	C. Rinner	H	420 m	MPC · JPL
825840	2018 XN_{26}	—	December 10, 2018	Mount Lemmon	Mount Lemmon Survey	H	370 m	MPC · JPL
825841	2018 XP_{26}	—	November 20, 2015	Mount Lemmon	Mount Lemmon Survey	H	370 m	MPC · JPL
825842	2018 XP_{28}	—	December 14, 2018	Haleakala	Pan-STARRS 1	EOS	1.3 km	MPC · JPL
825843	2018 XM_{29}	—	December 14, 2018	Haleakala	Pan-STARRS 1	V	500 m	MPC · JPL
825844	2018 XN_{29}	—	December 14, 2018	Haleakala	Pan-STARRS 1	DOR	1.5 km	MPC · JPL
825845	2018 XH_{32}	—	December 10, 2018	Mount Lemmon	Mount Lemmon Survey	·	1.1 km	MPC · JPL
825846	2018 XW_{32}	—	January 23, 2015	Haleakala	Pan-STARRS 1	·	1.8 km	MPC · JPL
825847	2018 XQ_{34}	—	December 14, 2018	Haleakala	Pan-STARRS 1	H	540 m	MPC · JPL
825848	2018 XR_{40}	—	December 4, 2018	Mount Lemmon	Mount Lemmon Survey	·	980 m	MPC · JPL
825849	2018 YD_{1}	—	January 28, 2015	Haleakala	Pan-STARRS 1	·	1.3 km	MPC · JPL
825850	2018 YP_{5}	—	January 31, 2009	Mount Lemmon	Mount Lemmon Survey	·	460 m	MPC · JPL
825851	2018 YK_{6}	—	December 20, 2018	Mount Lemmon	Mount Lemmon Survey	T_{j} (2.97)	2.1 km	MPC · JPL
825852	2018 YL_{9}	—	December 31, 2018	Haleakala	Pan-STARRS 1	·	1.3 km	MPC · JPL
825853	2018 YW_{9}	—	December 16, 2018	Haleakala	Pan-STARRS 1	H	440 m	MPC · JPL
825854	2018 YF_{10}	—	December 17, 2018	Haleakala	Pan-STARRS 1	H	350 m	MPC · JPL
825855	2018 YS_{11}	—	September 17, 2017	Haleakala	Pan-STARRS 1	·	1.3 km	MPC · JPL
825856	2018 YH_{13}	—	December 17, 2018	Palomar Mountain	Zwicky Transient Facility	H	440 m	MPC · JPL
825857	2019 AC_{1}	—	February 3, 2009	Kitt Peak	Spacewatch	H	340 m	MPC · JPL
825858	2019 AE_{1}	—	October 30, 2010	Catalina	CSS	H	430 m	MPC · JPL
825859	2019 AJ_{1}	—	April 7, 2017	Haleakala	Pan-STARRS 1	H	360 m	MPC · JPL
825860	2019 AA_{6}	—	August 25, 2012	Catalina	CSS	H	470 m	MPC · JPL
825861	2019 AA_{8}	—	December 24, 2005	Kitt Peak	Spacewatch	H	500 m	MPC · JPL
825862	2019 AV_{8}	—	November 9, 2007	Kitt Peak	Spacewatch	H	340 m	MPC · JPL
825863	2019 AZ_{10}	—	May 19, 2017	Mount Lemmon	Mount Lemmon Survey	H	480 m	MPC · JPL
825864	2019 AQ_{12}	—	December 6, 2015	Haleakala	Pan-STARRS 1	H	340 m	MPC · JPL
825865	2019 AU_{12}	—	October 24, 2015	Haleakala	Pan-STARRS 1	H	350 m	MPC · JPL
825866	2019 AW_{12}	—	April 29, 2014	Cerro Tololo	DECam	H	400 m	MPC · JPL
825867	2019 AN_{16}	—	July 22, 2017	ESA OGS	ESA OGS	PHO	1.0 km	MPC · JPL
825868	2019 AO_{17}	—	September 2, 2014	Kitt Peak	Spacewatch	·	520 m	MPC · JPL
825869	2019 AA_{24}	—	April 14, 2015	Mount Lemmon	Mount Lemmon Survey	·	1.7 km	MPC · JPL
825870	2019 AO_{26}	—	July 9, 2015	Haleakala	Pan-STARRS 1	EOS	1.4 km	MPC · JPL
825871	2019 AE_{35}	—	March 25, 2015	Haleakala	Pan-STARRS 1	·	1.3 km	MPC · JPL
825872	2019 AN_{35}	—	September 6, 2013	Mount Lemmon	Mount Lemmon Survey	·	1.2 km	MPC · JPL
825873	2019 AQ_{44}	—	January 2, 2012	Mount Lemmon	Mount Lemmon Survey	PHO	700 m	MPC · JPL
825874	2019 AW_{45}	—	January 10, 2007	Mount Lemmon	Mount Lemmon Survey	·	2.1 km	MPC · JPL
825875	2019 AX_{53}	—	April 2, 2009	Mount Lemmon	Mount Lemmon Survey	·	1.4 km	MPC · JPL
825876	2019 AG_{54}	—	January 12, 2019	Haleakala	Pan-STARRS 1	LIX	3.0 km	MPC · JPL
825877	2019 AG_{57}	—	January 7, 2019	Haleakala	Pan-STARRS 1	·	1.9 km	MPC · JPL
825878	2019 AL_{58}	—	January 4, 2019	Haleakala	Pan-STARRS 1	H	390 m	MPC · JPL
825879	2019 AR_{58}	—	January 12, 2019	Haleakala	Pan-STARRS 1	TIR	2.2 km	MPC · JPL
825880	2019 AV_{60}	—	January 10, 2019	Haleakala	Pan-STARRS 1	·	2.1 km	MPC · JPL
825881	2019 AX_{60}	—	January 1, 2019	Haleakala	Pan-STARRS 1	H	430 m	MPC · JPL
825882	2019 AU_{61}	—	January 11, 2019	Haleakala	Pan-STARRS 1	·	2.3 km	MPC · JPL
825883	2019 AZ_{64}	—	January 10, 2019	Haleakala	Pan-STARRS 1	H	420 m	MPC · JPL
825884	2019 AA_{67}	—	April 28, 2014	Cerro Tololo	DECam	H	400 m	MPC · JPL
825885	2019 AV_{67}	—	January 8, 2019	Haleakala	Pan-STARRS 1	H	440 m	MPC · JPL
825886	2019 AS_{68}	—	January 8, 2019	Haleakala	Pan-STARRS 1	EOS	1.2 km	MPC · JPL
825887	2019 AH_{71}	—	January 9, 2019	Haleakala	Pan-STARRS 1	·	1.0 km	MPC · JPL
825888	2019 AG_{77}	—	January 3, 2019	Haleakala	Pan-STARRS 1	T_{j} (2.95)	1.7 km	MPC · JPL
825889	2019 AH_{77}	—	January 3, 2019	Haleakala	Pan-STARRS 1	·	1.2 km	MPC · JPL
825890	2019 AJ_{80}	—	March 23, 2015	Kitt Peak	L. H. Wasserman, M. W. Buie	KOR	970 m	MPC · JPL
825891	2019 AN_{80}	—	November 23, 2014	Mount Lemmon	Mount Lemmon Survey	·	500 m	MPC · JPL
825892	2019 AG_{82}	—	December 29, 2014	Haleakala	Pan-STARRS 1	·	1.6 km	MPC · JPL
825893	2019 AE_{83}	—	January 8, 2019	Haleakala	Pan-STARRS 1	HNS	890 m	MPC · JPL
825894	2019 AP_{83}	—	January 8, 2019	Haleakala	Pan-STARRS 1	·	830 m	MPC · JPL
825895	2019 AC_{85}	—	January 21, 2015	Haleakala	Pan-STARRS 1	·	1.4 km	MPC · JPL
825896	2019 AP_{89}	—	January 26, 2015	Haleakala	Pan-STARRS 1	·	1.3 km	MPC · JPL
825897	2019 AL_{93}	—	January 8, 2019	Haleakala	Pan-STARRS 1	·	1.8 km	MPC · JPL
825898	2019 AZ_{96}	—	January 4, 2019	Mount Lemmon	Mount Lemmon Survey	H	410 m	MPC · JPL
825899	2019 AC_{97}	—	January 26, 2015	Haleakala	Pan-STARRS 1	·	1.6 km	MPC · JPL
825900	2019 AD_{99}	—	January 7, 2019	Haleakala	Pan-STARRS 1	PHO	540 m	MPC · JPL

== 825901–826000 ==
back to top

Designation			Discovery			Properties		Ref
Permanent	Provisional	Named after	Date	Site	Discoverer(s)	Category	Diam.	Ref
825901	2019 AS_{99}	—	January 3, 2019	Haleakala	Pan-STARRS 1	H	360 m	MPC · JPL
825902	2019 AU_{99}	—	January 10, 2019	Haleakala	Pan-STARRS 1	·	870 m	MPC · JPL
825903	2019 AE_{118}	—	January 8, 2019	Haleakala	Pan-STARRS 1	·	1.8 km	MPC · JPL
825904	2019 AT_{130}	—	January 9, 2019	Haleakala	Pan-STARRS 1	H	390 m	MPC · JPL
825905	2019 AD_{148}	—	November 25, 2005	Mount Lemmon	Mount Lemmon Survey	·	400 m	MPC · JPL
825906	2019 AD_{149}	—	January 8, 2019	Haleakala	Pan-STARRS 1	·	1.6 km	MPC · JPL
825907	2019 AO_{151}	—	January 13, 2019	Haleakala	Pan-STARRS 1	·	1.4 km	MPC · JPL
825908	2019 BB	—	February 22, 2014	Catalina	CSS	H	450 m	MPC · JPL
825909	2019 BR_{1}	—	January 24, 2019	Haleakala	Pan-STARRS 1	APO	270 m	MPC · JPL
825910	2019 BZ_{2}	—	May 24, 2017	Haleakala	Pan-STARRS 1	H	350 m	MPC · JPL
825911	2019 BD_{7}	—	November 26, 2014	Haleakala	Pan-STARRS 1	·	1.0 km	MPC · JPL
825912	2019 BB_{8}	—	January 20, 2015	Mount Lemmon	Mount Lemmon Survey	·	1.3 km	MPC · JPL
825913	2019 BP_{10}	—	January 27, 2019	Haleakala	Pan-STARRS 1	·	2.1 km	MPC · JPL
825914	2019 BD_{11}	—	January 16, 2019	Haleakala	Pan-STARRS 1	·	1.3 km	MPC · JPL
825915	2019 BD_{15}	—	April 4, 2014	Haleakala	Pan-STARRS 1	·	1.8 km	MPC · JPL
825916	2019 CB_{1}	—	January 3, 2019	Haleakala	Pan-STARRS 1	H	350 m	MPC · JPL
825917	2019 CF_{2}	—	February 13, 2011	Mount Lemmon	Mount Lemmon Survey	H	370 m	MPC · JPL
825918	2019 CP_{2}	—	November 21, 2014	Haleakala	Pan-STARRS 1	L5	8.2 km	MPC · JPL
825919	2019 CL_{3}	—	September 20, 2009	Mount Lemmon	Mount Lemmon Survey	H	480 m	MPC · JPL
825920	2019 CW_{4}	—	March 8, 2014	Mount Lemmon	Mount Lemmon Survey	H	370 m	MPC · JPL
825921	2019 CX_{11}	—	February 4, 2019	Haleakala	Pan-STARRS 1	EUP	2.0 km	MPC · JPL
825922	2019 CE_{12}	—	February 5, 2019	Haleakala	Pan-STARRS 1	·	2.5 km	MPC · JPL
825923	2019 CV_{12}	—	February 4, 2019	Haleakala	Pan-STARRS 1	T_{j} (2.99)	2.4 km	MPC · JPL
825924	2019 CP_{13}	—	April 18, 2015	Cerro Tololo	DECam	HNS	920 m	MPC · JPL
825925	2019 CC_{14}	—	February 5, 2019	Haleakala	Pan-STARRS 2	L5	8.3 km	MPC · JPL
825926	2019 CJ_{14}	—	February 9, 2019	Haleakala	Pan-STARRS 1	·	1.9 km	MPC · JPL
825927	2019 CW_{16}	—	February 5, 2019	Haleakala	Pan-STARRS 2	PHO	880 m	MPC · JPL
825928	2019 CA_{17}	—	February 9, 2019	Haleakala	Pan-STARRS 1	H	440 m	MPC · JPL
825929	2019 CW_{20}	—	February 4, 2019	Haleakala	Pan-STARRS 1	·	1.7 km	MPC · JPL
825930	2019 CU_{21}	—	February 5, 2019	Haleakala	Pan-STARRS 1	·	1.5 km	MPC · JPL
825931	2019 CL_{22}	—	May 10, 2014	Mount Lemmon	Mount Lemmon Survey	URS	2.1 km	MPC · JPL
825932	2019 CW_{23}	—	February 4, 2019	Haleakala	Pan-STARRS 1	·	1.9 km	MPC · JPL
825933	2019 CL_{26}	—	February 9, 2019	Haleakala	Pan-STARRS 1	H	350 m	MPC · JPL
825934	2019 CE_{27}	—	April 1, 2012	Mount Lemmon	Mount Lemmon Survey	·	680 m	MPC · JPL
825935	2019 DA_{5}	—	January 16, 2019	Haleakala	Pan-STARRS 2	·	1.9 km	MPC · JPL
825936	2019 DG_{5}	—	February 26, 2019	Mount Lemmon	Mount Lemmon Survey	·	1.6 km	MPC · JPL
825937	2019 EM	—	January 3, 2016	Mount Lemmon	Mount Lemmon Survey	H	570 m	MPC · JPL
825938	2019 EG_{4}	—	March 15, 2019	Mount Lemmon	Mount Lemmon Survey	(1547)	1.2 km	MPC · JPL
825939	2019 ET_{4}	—	March 5, 2019	Mount Lemmon	Mount Lemmon Survey	H	420 m	MPC · JPL
825940	2019 EV_{4}	—	March 3, 2019	Mount Lemmon	Mount Lemmon Survey	H	530 m	MPC · JPL
825941	2019 EB_{7}	—	March 6, 2019	Mount Lemmon	Mount Lemmon Survey	·	1.8 km	MPC · JPL
825942	2019 FV_{5}	—	April 24, 2008	Mount Lemmon	Mount Lemmon Survey	·	1.9 km	MPC · JPL
825943	2019 FY_{7}	—	March 31, 2019	Mount Lemmon	Mount Lemmon Survey	·	2.3 km	MPC · JPL
825944	2019 FQ_{8}	—	September 22, 2009	Mount Lemmon	Mount Lemmon Survey	(895)	2.8 km	MPC · JPL
825945	2019 FR_{8}	—	March 31, 2019	Mount Lemmon	Mount Lemmon Survey	BRG	1.0 km	MPC · JPL
825946	2019 FP_{12}	—	March 31, 2019	Mount Lemmon	Mount Lemmon Survey	·	1.8 km	MPC · JPL
825947	2019 FJ_{15}	—	March 29, 2019	Mount Lemmon	Mount Lemmon Survey	·	700 m	MPC · JPL
825948	2019 FA_{16}	—	March 29, 2019	Mount Lemmon	Mount Lemmon Survey	·	490 m	MPC · JPL
825949	2019 FR_{17}	—	February 14, 2013	Haleakala	Pan-STARRS 1	·	2.3 km	MPC · JPL
825950	2019 FD_{18}	—	March 29, 2019	Mount Lemmon	Mount Lemmon Survey	THB	1.8 km	MPC · JPL
825951	2019 FF_{18}	—	March 29, 2019	Mount Lemmon	Mount Lemmon Survey	LIX	2.7 km	MPC · JPL
825952	2019 FR_{21}	—	August 13, 2012	Haleakala	Pan-STARRS 1	·	830 m	MPC · JPL
825953	2019 FP_{22}	—	March 29, 2019	Mount Lemmon	Mount Lemmon Survey	THM	1.8 km	MPC · JPL
825954	2019 FK_{24}	—	February 28, 2019	Mount Lemmon	Mount Lemmon Survey	·	700 m	MPC · JPL
825955	2019 FJ_{25}	—	September 10, 2010	Kitt Peak	Spacewatch	·	510 m	MPC · JPL
825956	2019 FQ_{25}	—	March 29, 2019	Mount Lemmon	Mount Lemmon Survey	·	1.9 km	MPC · JPL
825957	2019 FZ_{25}	—	March 31, 2019	Mount Lemmon	Mount Lemmon Survey	·	2.0 km	MPC · JPL
825958	2019 FA_{28}	—	March 29, 2019	Mount Lemmon	Mount Lemmon Survey	·	2.1 km	MPC · JPL
825959	2019 FQ_{29}	—	March 31, 2019	Mount Lemmon	Mount Lemmon Survey	·	480 m	MPC · JPL
825960	2019 FD_{34}	—	March 31, 2019	Mount Lemmon	Mount Lemmon Survey	V	450 m	MPC · JPL
825961	2019 GO_{7}	—	March 27, 2012	Mount Lemmon	Mount Lemmon Survey	·	750 m	MPC · JPL
825962	2019 GW_{9}	—	October 1, 2010	Mount Lemmon	Mount Lemmon Survey	·	1.2 km	MPC · JPL
825963	2019 GX_{10}	—	December 23, 2017	Haleakala	Pan-STARRS 1	·	1.9 km	MPC · JPL
825964	2019 GR_{16}	—	March 31, 2019	Mount Lemmon	Mount Lemmon Survey	·	460 m	MPC · JPL
825965	2019 GW_{27}	—	April 8, 2019	Mount Lemmon	Mount Lemmon Survey	·	2.7 km	MPC · JPL
825966	2019 GE_{31}	—	April 4, 2019	Mount Lemmon	Mount Lemmon Survey	·	2.3 km	MPC · JPL
825967	2019 GA_{38}	—	January 22, 2015	Haleakala	Pan-STARRS 1	·	620 m	MPC · JPL
825968	2019 GU_{40}	—	September 9, 2015	Haleakala	Pan-STARRS 1	VER	1.9 km	MPC · JPL
825969	2019 GR_{42}	—	April 5, 2019	Haleakala	Pan-STARRS 1	·	2.3 km	MPC · JPL
825970	2019 GS_{47}	—	September 30, 2005	Mount Lemmon	Mount Lemmon Survey	·	2.4 km	MPC · JPL
825971	2019 GT_{47}	—	March 26, 2014	Mount Lemmon	Mount Lemmon Survey	·	1.7 km	MPC · JPL
825972	2019 GB_{48}	—	May 15, 2008	Mount Lemmon	Mount Lemmon Survey	·	2.3 km	MPC · JPL
825973	2019 GH_{48}	—	April 3, 2019	Mount Lemmon	Mount Lemmon Survey	·	1.7 km	MPC · JPL
825974	2019 GL_{49}	—	September 24, 2015	Mount Lemmon	Mount Lemmon Survey	·	2.3 km	MPC · JPL
825975	2019 GD_{50}	—	April 4, 2019	Haleakala	Pan-STARRS 1	·	640 m	MPC · JPL
825976	2019 GG_{50}	—	April 8, 2019	Haleakala	Pan-STARRS 1	·	520 m	MPC · JPL
825977	2019 GZ_{51}	—	April 3, 2019	Haleakala	Pan-STARRS 1	·	450 m	MPC · JPL
825978	2019 GZ_{52}	—	April 3, 2019	Haleakala	Pan-STARRS 1	·	520 m	MPC · JPL
825979	2019 GM_{53}	—	April 3, 2019	Haleakala	Pan-STARRS 1	·	1.9 km	MPC · JPL
825980	2019 GS_{53}	—	April 14, 2019	Mount Lemmon	Mount Lemmon Survey	·	1.9 km	MPC · JPL
825981	2019 GY_{53}	—	April 3, 2019	Haleakala	Pan-STARRS 1	·	1.7 km	MPC · JPL
825982	2019 GJ_{54}	—	April 2, 2019	Haleakala	Pan-STARRS 1	·	1.2 km	MPC · JPL
825983	2019 GT_{56}	—	April 2, 2019	Haleakala	Pan-STARRS 1	·	2.1 km	MPC · JPL
825984	2019 GX_{56}	—	April 6, 2019	Haleakala	Pan-STARRS 1	·	760 m	MPC · JPL
825985	2019 GV_{57}	—	May 2, 2015	Cerro Paranal	Gaia Ground Based Optical Tracking	·	780 m	MPC · JPL
825986	2019 GY_{57}	—	April 5, 2019	Haleakala	Pan-STARRS 1	·	2.5 km	MPC · JPL
825987	2019 GC_{58}	—	April 5, 2019	Haleakala	Pan-STARRS 1	·	2.5 km	MPC · JPL
825988	2019 GK_{58}	—	April 5, 2019	Haleakala	Pan-STARRS 1	·	1.8 km	MPC · JPL
825989	2019 GP_{58}	—	April 5, 2019	Haleakala	Pan-STARRS 1	L5	6.0 km	MPC · JPL
825990	2019 GX_{58}	—	April 8, 2019	Haleakala	Pan-STARRS 1	·	2.3 km	MPC · JPL
825991	2019 GO_{59}	—	April 6, 2019	Haleakala	Pan-STARRS 1	·	2.1 km	MPC · JPL
825992	2019 GR_{63}	—	January 17, 2007	Kitt Peak	Spacewatch	·	2.1 km	MPC · JPL
825993	2019 GL_{66}	—	April 7, 2019	Haleakala	Pan-STARRS 1	·	1.5 km	MPC · JPL
825994	2019 GN_{66}	—	April 8, 2019	Haleakala	Pan-STARRS 1	·	1.7 km	MPC · JPL
825995	2019 GD_{68}	—	April 3, 2019	Haleakala	Pan-STARRS 1	·	1.8 km	MPC · JPL
825996	2019 GX_{68}	—	April 2, 2019	Haleakala	Pan-STARRS 1	·	420 m	MPC · JPL
825997	2019 GZ_{69}	—	April 4, 2019	Haleakala	Pan-STARRS 1	VER	1.9 km	MPC · JPL
825998	2019 GB_{73}	—	April 6, 2019	Haleakala	Pan-STARRS 1	·	580 m	MPC · JPL
825999	2019 GY_{80}	—	May 23, 2014	Haleakala	Pan-STARRS 1	·	1.3 km	MPC · JPL
826000	2019 GQ_{84}	—	April 5, 2019	Haleakala	Pan-STARRS 1	·	840 m	MPC · JPL

back to top
