= 2018 CL =

Near-Earth asteroid

Discovery
- Discovered by: Zwicky Transient Facility
- Discovery site: Palomar Obs.
- Discovery date: 5 February 2018

Designations
- Minor planet category: NEO · Aten

Orbital characteristics
- Epoch 23 March 2018 (JD 2458200.5)
- Uncertainty parameter 6
- Observation arc: 2 days
- Aphelion: 1.0606 AU
- Perihelion: 0.6484 AU
- Semi-major axis: 0.8545 AU
- Eccentricity: 0.2412
- Orbital period (sidereal): 0.79 yr (289 days)
- Mean anomaly: 294.91°
- Mean motion: 1° 14^{m} 52.08^{s} / day
- Inclination: 11.847°
- Longitude of ascending node: 136.30°
- Argument of perihelion: 141.70°
- Earth MOID: 0.0046 AU (1.8 LD)

Physical characteristics
- Mean diameter: 50 m (160 ft)
- Apparent magnitude: 25.5–15 (at closest approach)
- Absolute magnitude (H): 25.525

2018 CL is a small asteroid and a near-Earth object of the Aten group, approximately 50 metres (160 feet) in diameter. It was the first confirmed finding, detected on 5 February 2018, announced on 8 February 2018, of the Zwicky Transient Facility project, located at Palomar Observatory, California, in the United States.
