= Zwicky Transient Facility =

Wide-field sky survey at Palomar Observatory

- Named after: Fritz Zwicky
- Observatory code: I41
- Started: January 2018
- Website: ztf.caltech.edu

The Zwicky Transient Facility (ZTF, obs. code: I41) is a wide-field sky astronomical survey using a new camera attached to the Samuel Oschin Telescope at Palomar Observatory in San Diego County, California, United States. Commissioned in 2018, it supersedes the (Intermediate) Palomar Transient Factory (2009–2017) that used the same observatory code. It is named after the Swiss astronomer Fritz Zwicky.

== Description ==
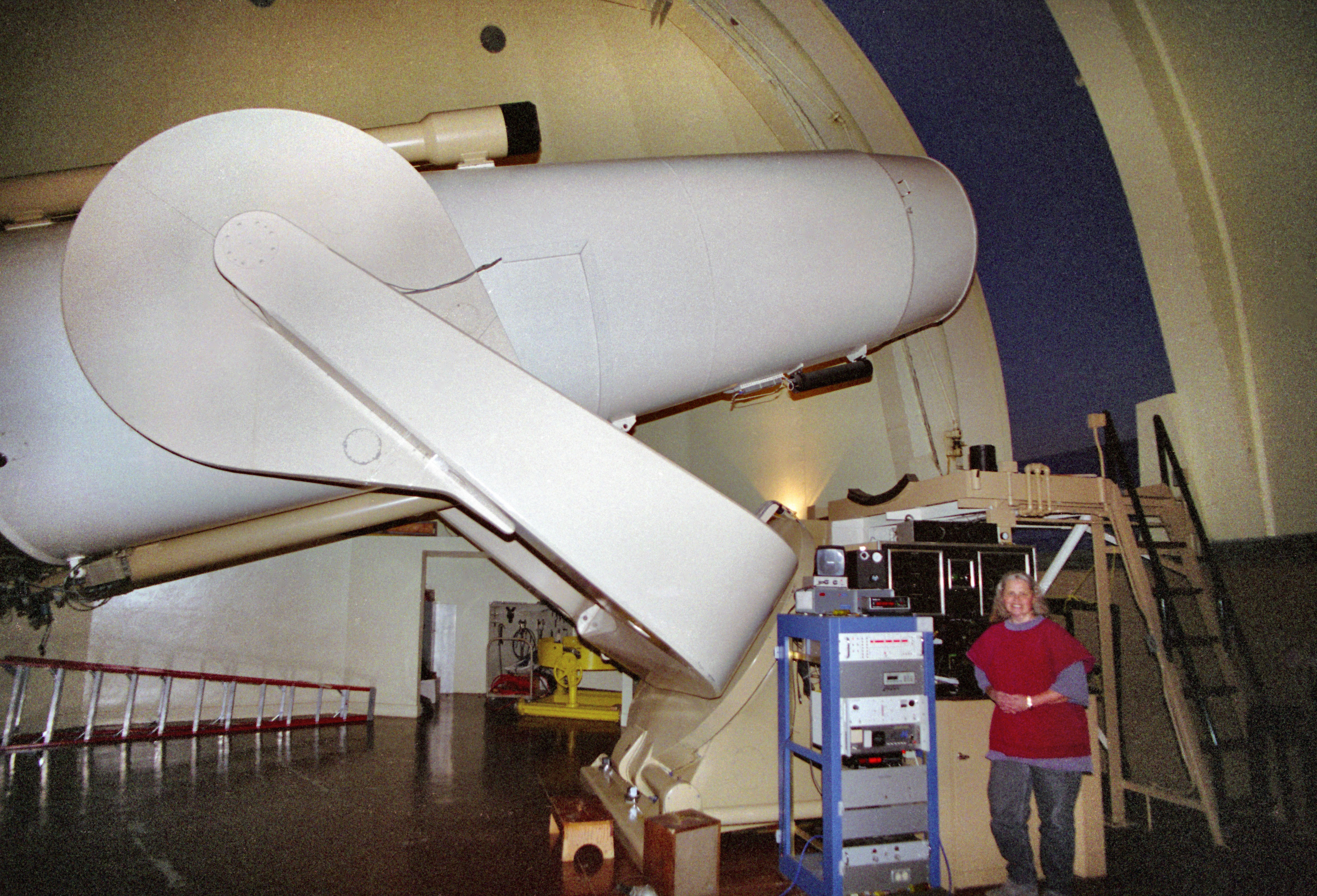
The Samuel Oschin Telescope, used for the survey

Observing in visible and infrared wavelengths, the Zwicky Transient Facility is designed to detect transient objects that rapidly change in brightness, for example supernovae, gamma ray bursts, and collision between two neutron stars, and moving objects like comets and asteroids.

The new camera is made of 16 CCDs of 6144×6160 pixels each, enabling each exposure to cover an area of 47 square degrees. The Zwicky Transient Facility is designed to image the entire northern sky in three nights and scan the plane of the Milky Way twice each night to a limiting magnitude of 20.5 (r band, 5σ).

The amount of data produced by ZTF is expected to be ten times larger than its predecessor, the Intermediate Palomar Transient Factory. ZTF's large data allows it to act as a prototype for the Vera C. Rubin Observatory (formerly Large Synoptic Survey Telescope) that is expected to be in full operation in late 2025 and will accumulate ten times more data than ZTF.

First light was recorded of an area in the constellation Orion on November 1, 2017.

The first confirmed findings from the ZTF project were reported on February 7, 2018, with the discovery of 2018 CL, a small near-Earth asteroid.

== Discoveries ==
- On May 9, 2019, ZTF discovered its first comet, C/2019 J2 (Palomar), a long-period comet.
- A search of the ZTF archive identified images of the interstellar comet 2I/Borisov as early as December 13, 2018, extending observations back eight months.
- 594913 ꞌAylóꞌchaxnim, the first asteroid discovered whose orbit is entirely within the orbit of Venus, was discovered by ZTF during its Twilight Survey.
- A search of ZTF's images identified cataclysmic variable star ZTF J1813+4251, a binary with a period of under 1 hour.
- AT2021lwx, a long-lasting high-energy transient with a redshift of 0.9945, was discovered on April 13, 2021.
- A very bright tidal disruption event called AT2022cmc with a redshift of 1.19325, among the brightest astronomical events ever observed.
- Comet C/2022 E3 (ZTF), which reached naked eye visibility in early 2023.
- ZTF J1239+8347 contains two brown dwarfs orbiting so closely together that material flows between them?

== Gallery ==
Orion Nebula and other surrounding nebula in Orion imaged by ZTF during its first light.

Horsehead Nebula in Orion imaged by ZTF during its first light.

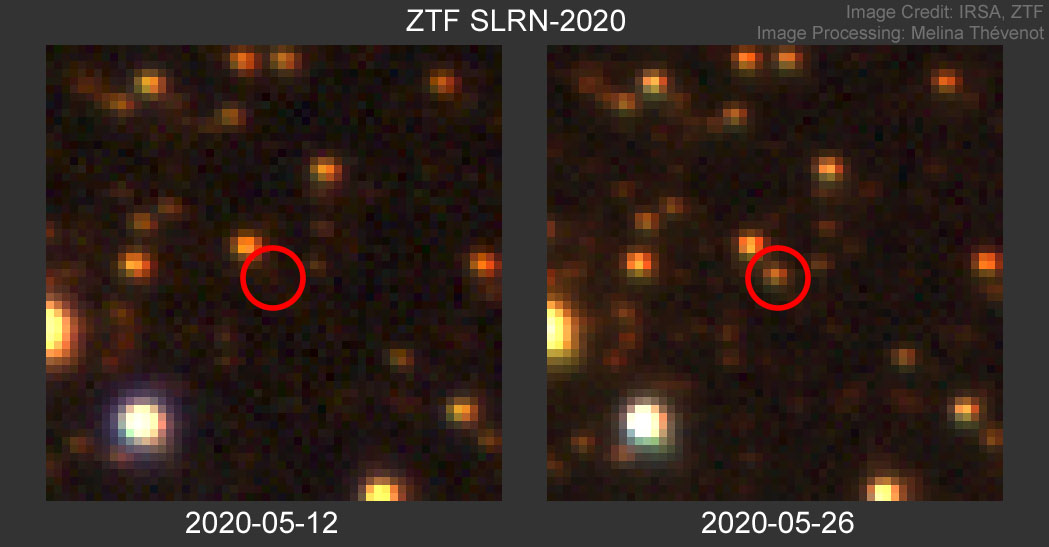
Images of ZTF SLRN-2020, a low-luminosity red nova discovered by ZTF in 2020, believed to have formed when a planet was swallowed by a star, before and after its discovery.

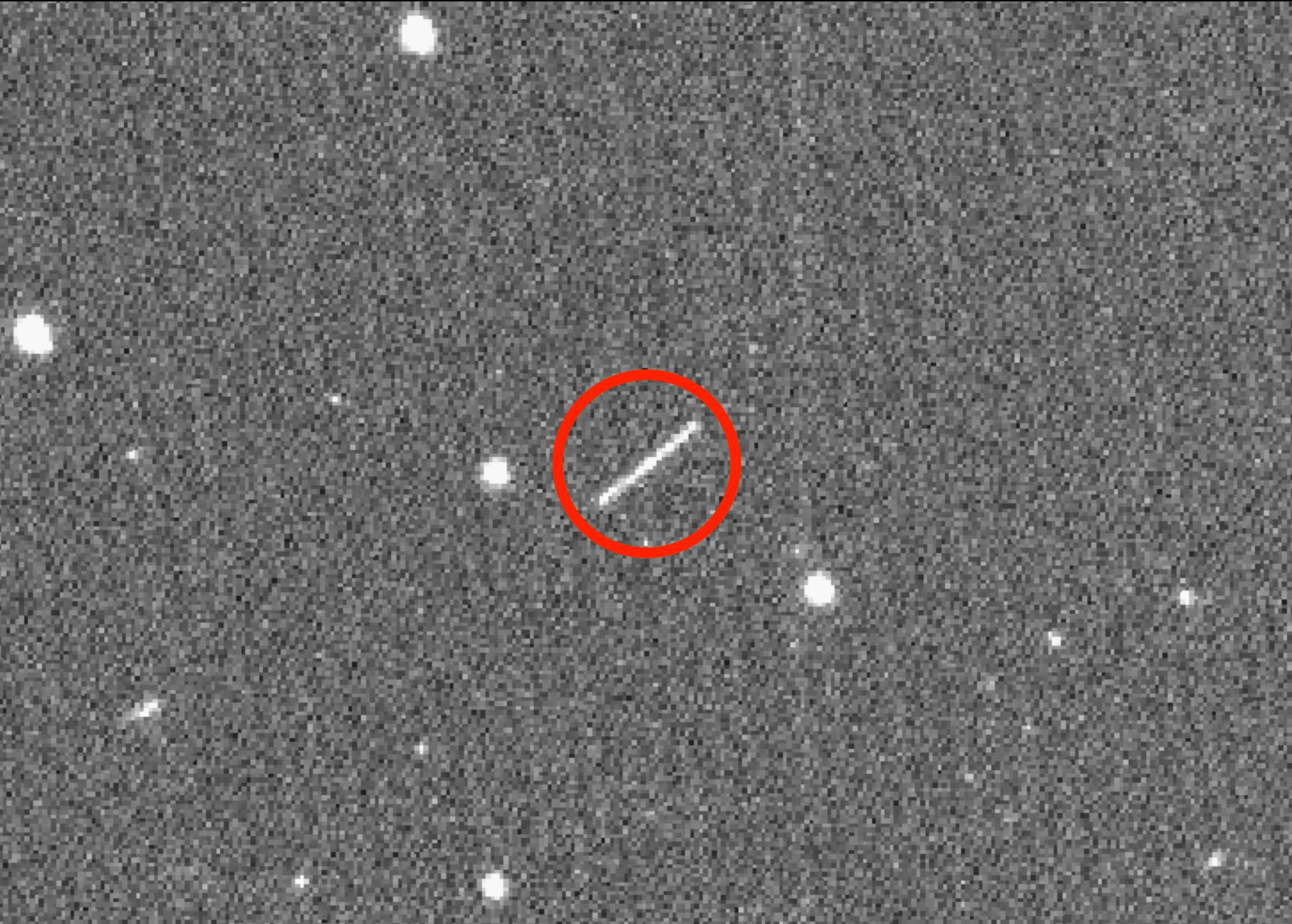
2020 QG, a near-Earth asteroid discovered by the ZTF in 2020, came within 2950 km of the Earth's surface.

Comet 235P/LINEAR as photographed by ZTF in December 2025

== See also ==
- Vera C. Rubin Observatory – Astronomical observatory in Chile
- Pan-STARRS – Multi-telescope astronomical survey
- OGLE survey
- GOTO (telescope array)
- ATLAS
