= V455 Andromedae =

Dwarf nova in the constellation Andromeda

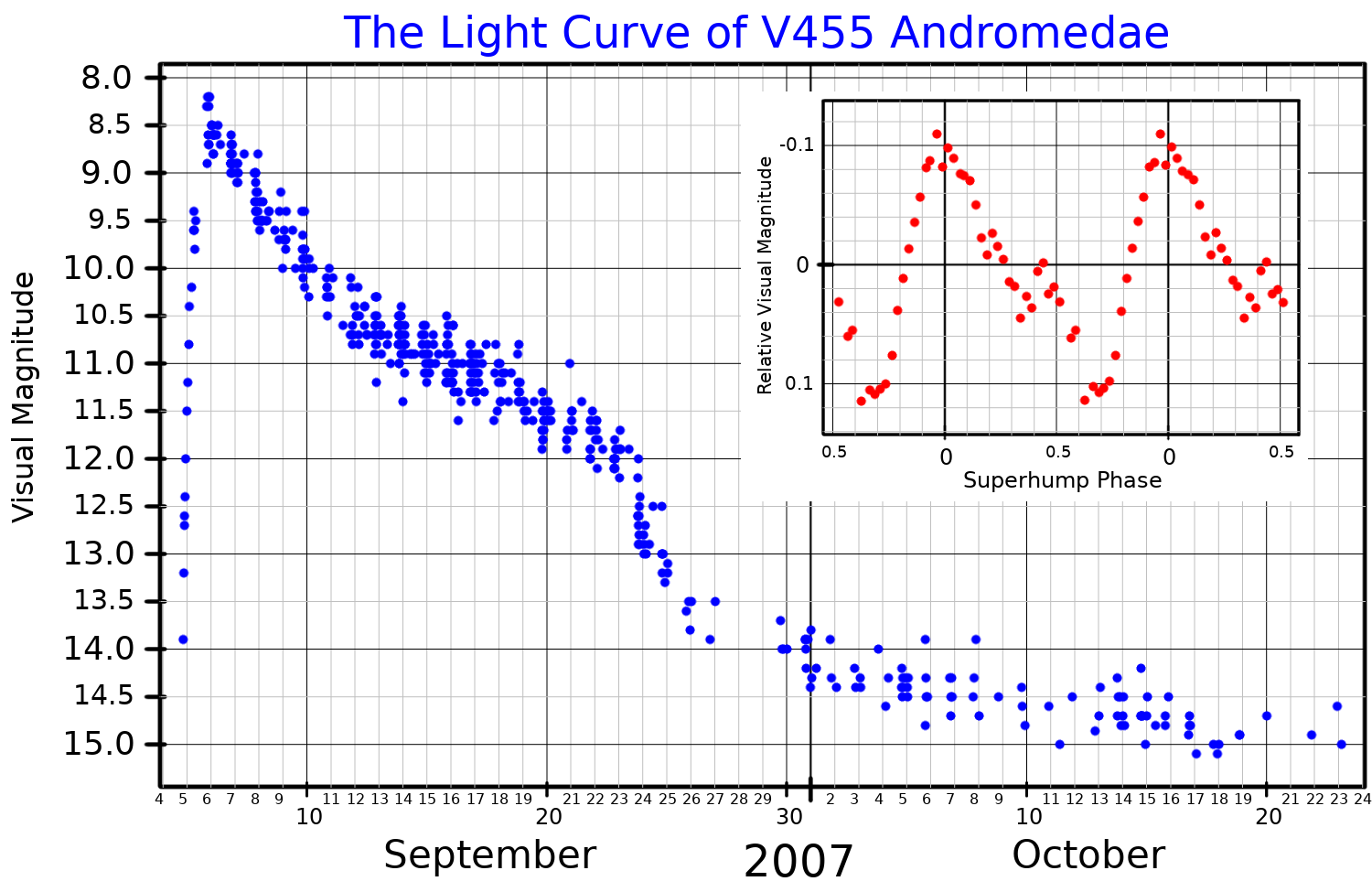
- The visual band light curve of the 2007 outburst of V455 Andromedae, from AAVSO data and Kato et al. (2008)

Observation data Epoch J2000 Equinox ICRS
- Constellation: Andromeda
- Right ascension: 23^{h} 34^{m} 01.4485^{s}
- Declination: +39° 21′ 40.867″
- Apparent magnitude (V): 8.5 – 16.5 variable

Characteristics
- Spectral type: pec(UG)
- Apparent magnitude (B): 16.22
- Apparent magnitude (R): 16.14
- Apparent magnitude (G): 16.0635
- Apparent magnitude (J): 15.528
- Apparent magnitude (H): 15.199
- Apparent magnitude (K): 14.567
- Variable type: Dwarf Nova

Astrometry
Proper motion (μ)	RA: −57.141±0.075 mas/yr Dec.: −139.317±0.060 mas/yr
Parallax (π)	13.2403±0.0556 mas
Distance	246 ± 1 ly (75.5 ± 0.3 pc)

Orbit
Period (P)	81.08 minutes
Inclination (i)	75°
Semi-amplitude (K_{1}) (primary)	36 km/s

Details

White dwarf
Mass	0.6 M_{☉}
Rotation	67.61970396±0.00000072 s

Donor star
Mass	0.07 M_{☉}

Other designations
- 2MASS J23340144+3921408

Database references
SIMBAD	data

V455 Andromedae (often abbreviated to V455 And) is a dwarf nova in the constellation Andromeda. It has a typical apparent visual magnitude of 16.5, but reached a magnitude of 8.5 during the only observed outburst.

== System ==
When it was discovered in 2003, during the quiescent phase, V455 Andromedae was classified as a cataclysmic variable, since its spectrum is similar to U Geminorum. V455 Andromedae is therefore a binary star where the primary is a white dwarf that is accreting matter from the secondary donor star. The rotation period of the white dwarf, slightly less than 68 seconds, is shorter than the orbital period so the white dwarf must possess a magnetic field channelling the material from the accretion disk to the poles of the white dwarf. This qualifies V455 Andromedae as a cataclysmic variable of the intermediate polar type. The spin period is expected to become shorter with time, but to date only upper limits on its decreasing trend has been determined.

The mass of the donor star is only 0.07 M_{☉}. This low mass makes V455 Andromedae similar to WZ Sagittae dwarf novae, which are expected to have a long period between outbursts.

== Variability ==
Eclipses in the light curve of V455 Andromedae revealed the binary nature of this star and its orbital period. Only one outburst event has been observed so far: V455 Andromedae brightened by 8 magnitudes during 2007. Such a large increase in brightness implies that this was a superoutburst, and V455 Andromedae is therefore a dwarf nova of the SU Ursae Majoris type. Superhumps were observed during the outburst.

Superhumps have also been reported during quiescence, known as permanent superhumps. An 83.38 min positive superhump was observed in 2000 - 2003, while 80.376 min negative superhumps were seen in 2013 and 2014. This is the first time negative superhumps have been detected in WZ sagittae dwarf novae during quiescence.

V455 Andromedae shows spectroscopic variations in its line profiles with a period of 3.5 hours. This is taken to be the precession period of a warped accretion disk, possibly retrograde precession.

The white dwarf primary pulsates radially with periods of about five or six minutes. These are considered to be incoherent, or possibly to consist of too many different periods to be analysed. Further brightness oscillations are seen with a period of 67.28 s, which is a beat period between the spin period and the spectroscopic period.

The brightness of V455 And has been gradually fading since 2008, mainly due to the gradual cooling of the white dwarf and the hot spot on the accretion disk and/or lower mass transfer, until an equilibrium level has been reached.
