= BZ Ursae Majoris =

Dwarf Nova in the constellation Ursa Major

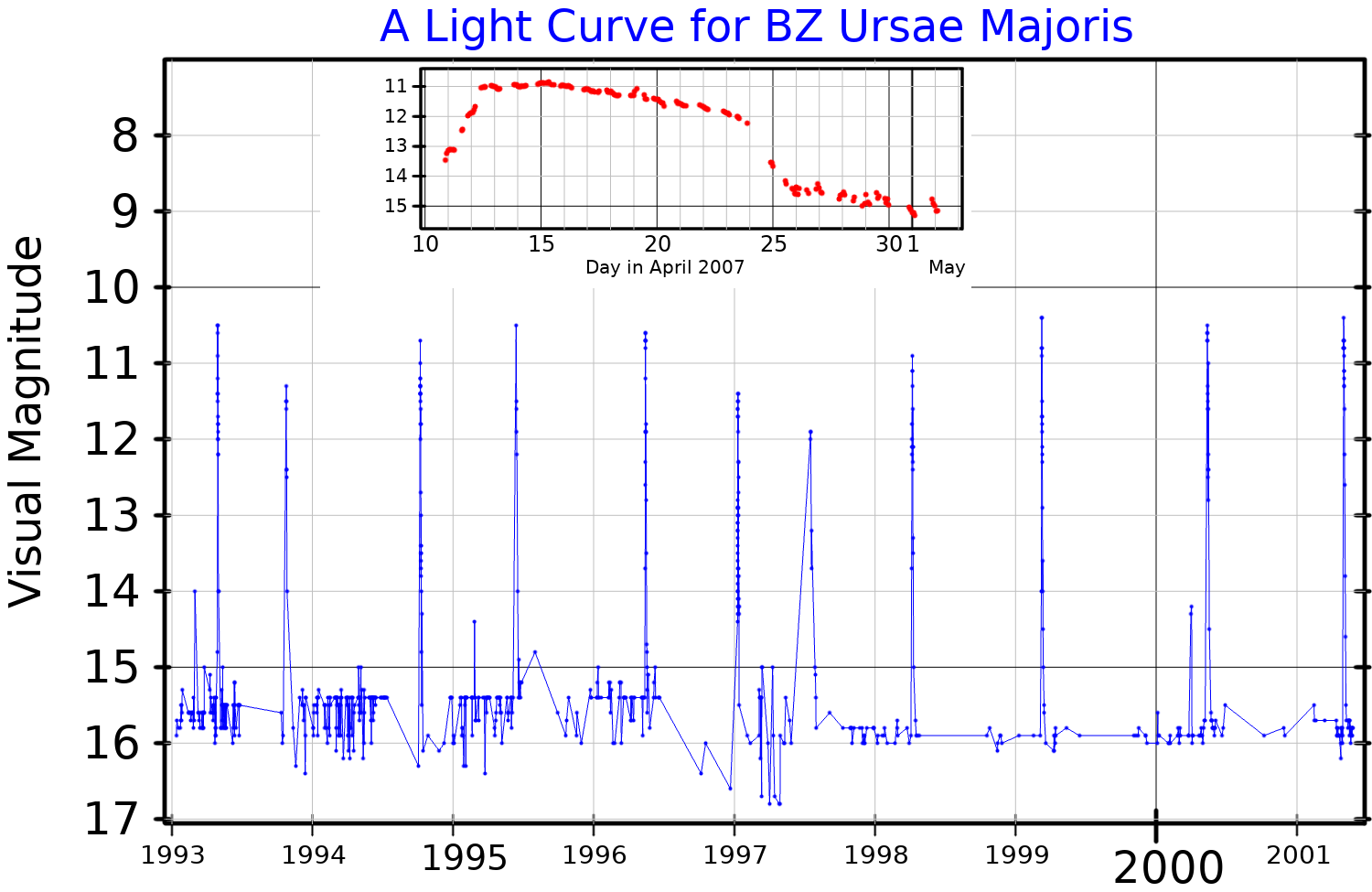
- A visual band light curve for BZ Ursae Majoris. The main plot (from AAVSO data) shows several outbursts, and the inset plot (adapted from Kato et al.) shows a single superoutburst in detail.

Observation data Epoch J2000.0 Equinox ICRS
- Constellation: Ursa Major
- Right ascension: 08^{h} 53^{m} 44.174^{s}
- Declination: +57° 48′ 40.59″
- Apparent magnitude (V): 15.7 to 16.5; 10.2 to 15.9

Characteristics
- Spectral type: M5.5:Ve
- Variable type: SU UMa

Astrometry
| Proper motion (μ) | RA: 26.318 mas/yr Dec.: −15.915 mas/yr |
| Parallax (π) | 6.4561±0.0441 mas |
| Distance | 505 ± 3 ly (155 ± 1 pc) |

Orbit
| Period (P) | 97.8±0.1 h |
| Inclination (i) | ~60° |
| Periastron epoch (T) | 2,448,319.897±0.003 HJD |

Details

White dwarf
| Mass | 0.65 M_{☉} |
| Radius | 6,880 km |
| Surface gravity (log g) | 7.5 cgs |
| Temperature | 15,000 K |
| Rotational velocity (v sin i) | 200 km/s |

Donor star
| Mass | 0.13 M_{☉} |

Other designations
- BZ UMa, 2MASS J08534416+5748406, PG 0849+580

Database references
| SIMBAD | data |

BZ Ursae Majoris is a dwarf nova star system in the northern circumpolar constellation of Ursa Major. It consists of a white dwarf primary in a close orbit with a red dwarf. The latter star is donating mass, which is accumulating in an accretion disk orbiting the white dwarf. The system is located at a distance of approximately 505 light years from the Sun based on parallax measurements.

This system was discovered to vary in brightness by B. E. Markaryan in 1968, and it was given the variable star designation BZ UMa. After four years of observation by the AAVSO, it was proposed to be a cataclysmic variable by M. Mayall. In 1982, R. F. Green and associates identified it as a cataclysmic variable candidate of the U Gem-type, based on its spectrum. The same year, W. Wenzel showed that this star had very long intervals between outbursts, placing it intermediate between the U Gem and WZ Sge classes. P. Szkody and L. Feinswog examined the infrared light curve of the system, estimating an orbital inclination of 60° with no evidence of heating from the white dwarf.

R. Claudi and associates in 1990 found a periodic modulation of hydrogen emission lines, indicating an orbital period of 1.62 h. They suggested it be classified as a SU UMa star. Spectroscopic examination of the system using the Hubble Space Telescope during 2001 showed an anomalous abundance ratio of nitrogen to carbon that indicates CNO-processing. This may be the result of an earlier evolutionary stage of the donor star that was stripped of its outer layers. A superoutburst was observed in 2007 that displayed superhumps. A lack of circular polarization indicates the white dwarf is not strongly magnetic, and thus this system is most likely not an intermediate polar.
