= DX Andromedae =

Star in the constellation Andromeda

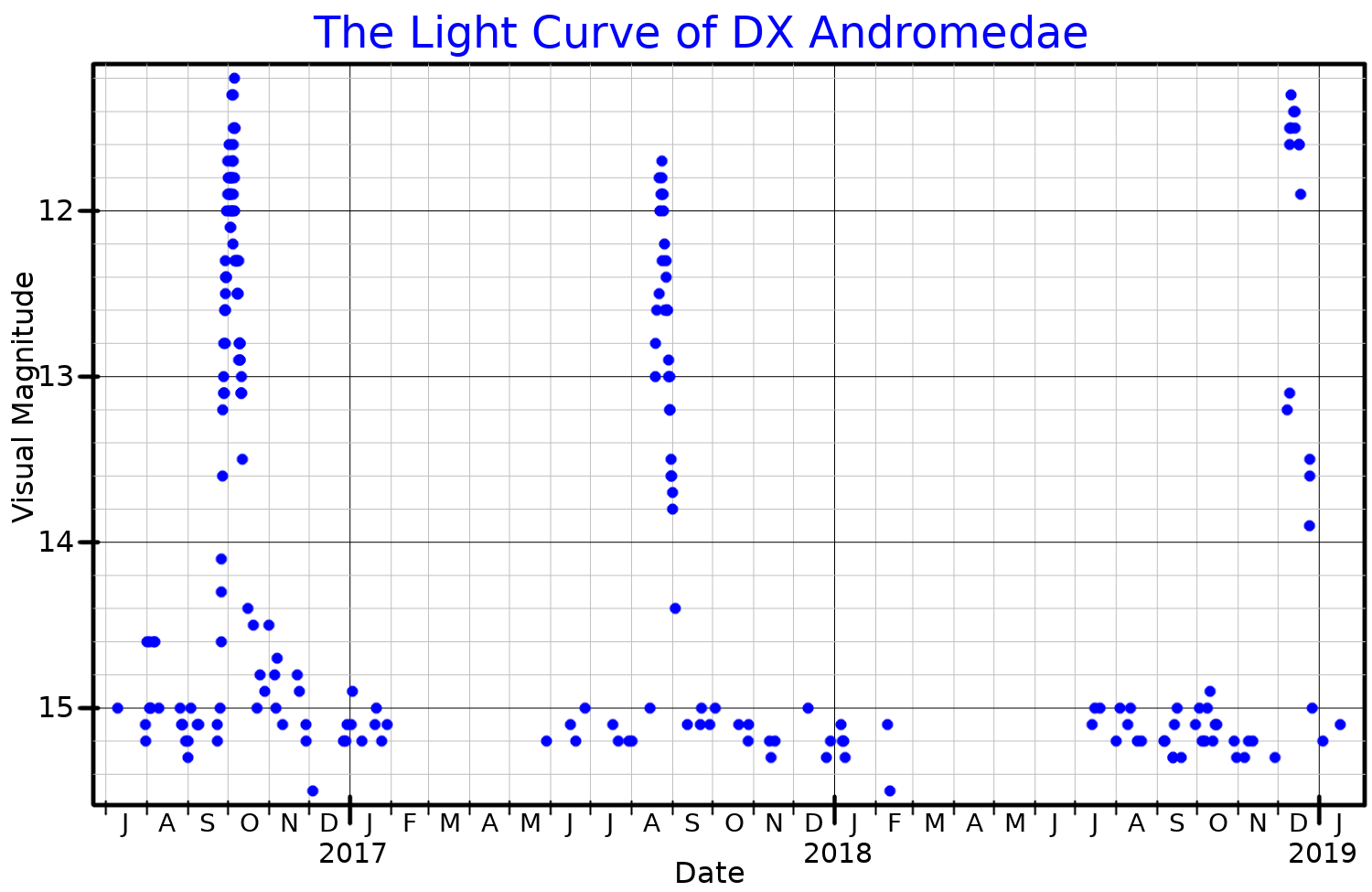
- The visual band light curve of DX Andromedae, from AAVSO data, showing three eruptions

Observation data Epoch J2000 Equinox ICRS
- Constellation: Andromeda
- Right ascension: 23^{h} 29^{m} 46.6839^{s}
- Declination: +43° 45′ 04.034″
- Apparent magnitude (V): 11.0 – 15.5 variable

Characteristics
- Spectral type: pec(UG) (K1 V)
- Apparent magnitude (B): 11.00
- Apparent magnitude (G): 14.7821
- Apparent magnitude (J): 13.106
- Apparent magnitude (H): 12.512
- Apparent magnitude (K): 12.390
- Variable type: Dwarf nova

Astrometry
Radial velocity (R_{v})	-2 km/s
Proper motion (μ)	RA: −8.343±0.035 mas/yr Dec.: −9.835±0.030 mas/yr
Parallax (π)	1.6685±0.0249 mas
Distance	1,950 ± 30 ly (599 ± 9 pc)

Orbit
Period (P)	10.6 hours
Inclination (i)	45°

Details

White Dwarf
Mass	0.8 (assumed) M_{☉}
Temperature	25,000 K

Donor star
Surface gravity (log g)	4.0 cgs
Temperature	5,000 K
Metallicity [Fe/H]	0 dex
Rotational velocity (v sin i)	79±5 km/s

Other designations
- 2MASS J23294667+4345040

Database references
SIMBAD	data

DX Andromedae (often abbreviated to DX And) is a cataclysmic variable star in the constellation Andromeda. It has a typical apparent visual magnitude of 15.5 during the quiescent phase, but becomes brighter (up to a magnitude of 11.0) during outbursts recurring with a mean cycle length of 330 days, thus is classified as a dwarf nova of the SS Cygni type.

== System ==
The system of DX Andromedae consists of a white dwarf accreting matter from a donor star through an accretion disk. The system shows a spectral type at quiescence of K1 V (plus emission lines), but the donor is considered to be a hydrogen-deficient star that has evolved off the main sequence and is overfilling its roche lobe. The donor star dominates the visible spectrum during the quiescent phase.

The spectral classification of DX Andromedae as a whole is classified as peculiar of the U Geminorum type. The spectrum of the donor star is itself peculiar; enhanced absorption lines of Ca_{I} and Cr_{I} have been observed.

== Variability ==
DX Andromedae was discovered by Giuliano Romano on a series of photographic plates begun on September 28, 1956. Its discovery was announced in 1958.

The outburst of dwarf novae are thought to arise from a thermal instability of the disk, that increases mass flow and temperature and hence the luminosity increases. In DX Andromedae different outbursts don't reach the same peak luminosity and don't occur at a regular rate, but they retain the same shape in the decaying part. It seems that the peak luminosity is correlated to the length of the preceding cycle, and the more luminous is the outburst, the faster the luminosity peak is reached. These trends can be explained by matter accumulating in the disk; more matter is accumulated in the disk during a longer cycle, and it can power a stronger outburst.
