= NSV 1436 =

Star in the constellation Perseus

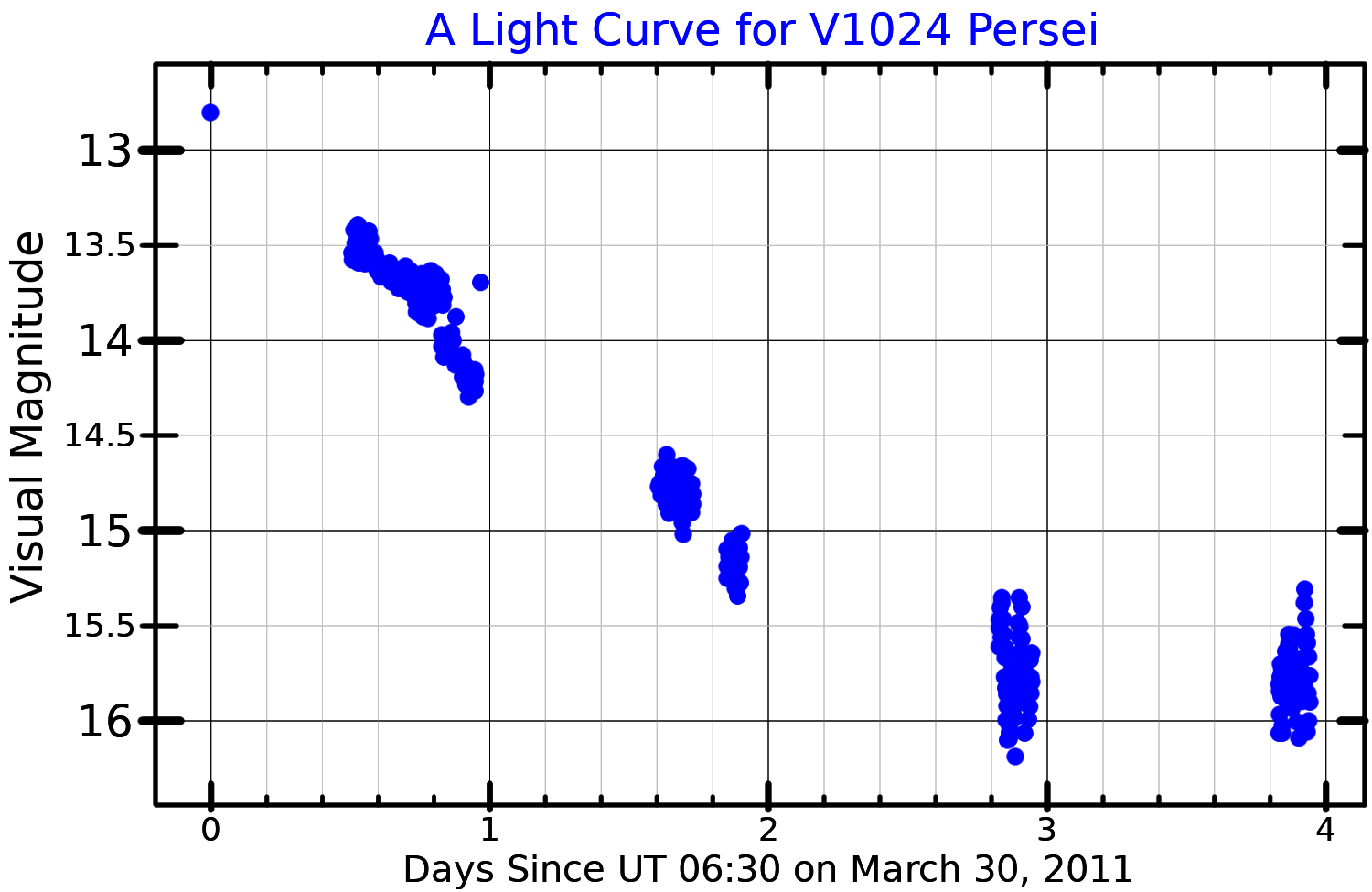
- A visual band light curve for the 2011 eruption of V1024 Persei, adapted from Osborne et al. (2011)

Observation data Epoch J2000 Equinox ICRS
- Constellation: Perseus
- Right ascension: 04^{h} 02^{m} 39.02^{s}
- Declination: +42° 50′ 46.3″
- Apparent magnitude (V): 12.1 - 19.0

Characteristics
- Variable type: U Gem

Other designations
- V1024 Persei, Ross 4, 1RXS J040239.4+425037.

Database references
SIMBAD	data

NSV 1436 is a cataclysmic variable star in the constellation Perseus. It is a probable U Geminorum-type dwarf nova, and outbursts have been observed in 1948 and 2011. It is also listed in the General Catalogue of Variable Stars as V1024 Persei.

V1024 Persei was initially named as Ross 4 in 1925, on the basis of photographic plates showing that it was much brighter in 1904 than in 1925. Another outburst was observed in November 1948. A small outburst occurred on March 9–10, 2011 when it briefly reached about visual magnitude 14.5. A brighter outburst phase began and was observed on March 28, 2011 at visual magnitude 13.49 and confirmed at visual magnitude 12.8 on March 30, 2011. The object is typically fainter than visual magnitude 16. In 2015, it was formally given the variable star designation V1024 Persei.

The modest outburst amplitude, and an increase in x-ray brightness as the optical brightness declines, suggest that this object is a dwarf nova rather than a recurrent nova. A relationship between decline rates and the orbital periods of dwarf novae suggest that the period is less than two hours. That would mean that it could be a WZ Sagittae type of dwarf nova, but the lack of superhumps and relatively small outburst magnitude increase and duration mean it is more likely to be a U Geminorum type.

== Location ==
NSV 1436 is one of three stars close together in an apparent line, being the third or farthest star away (northward) from the brightest of the three stars. The second star is very close to the brightest or first star.
