= LL Andromedae =

Dwarf nova star in the constellation Andromeda

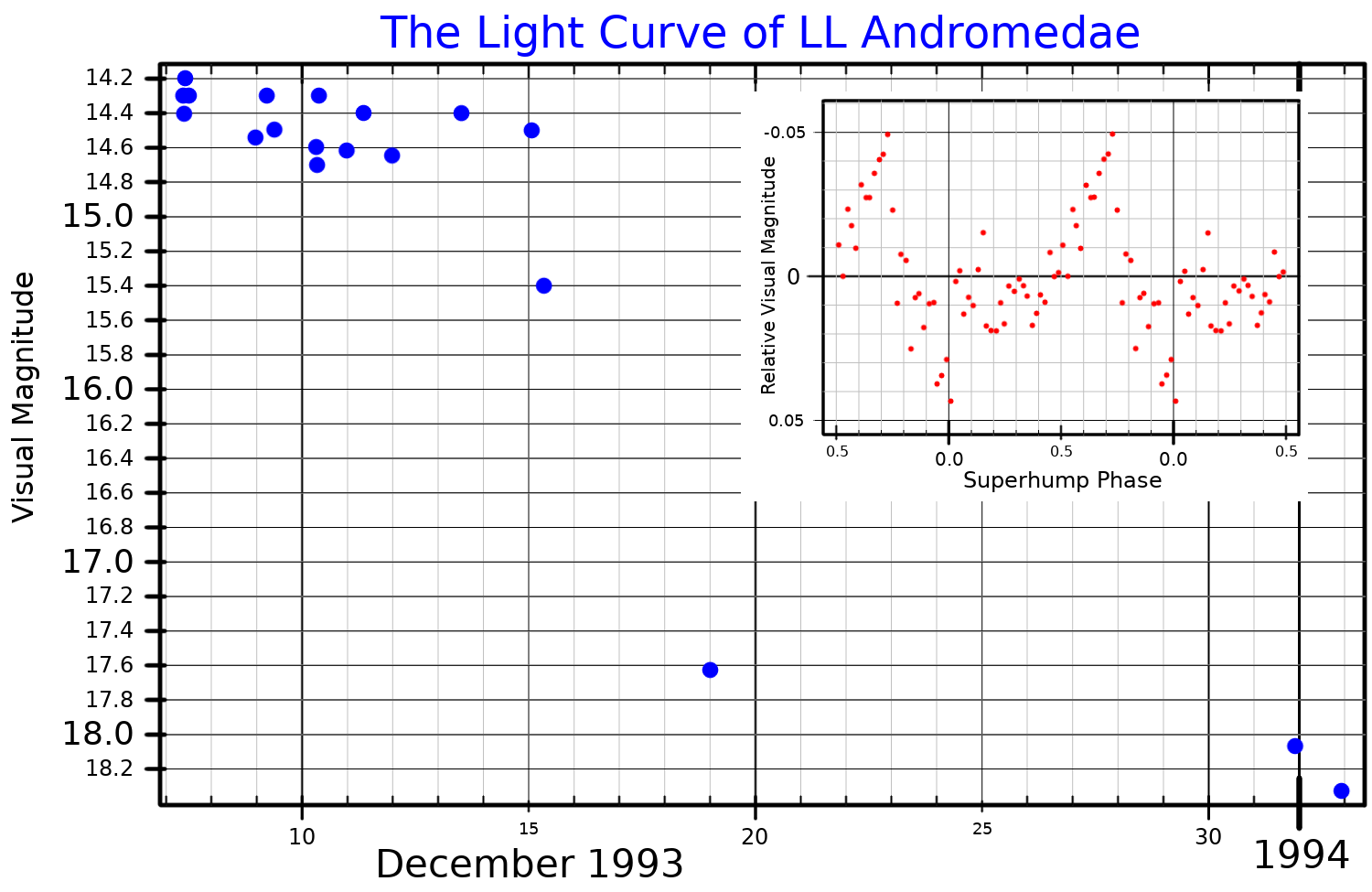
- The visual band light curve of LL Andromedae, adapted from Kato (2004), is shown. The main plot shows the decay from peak brightness, and the inset plot shows an average of the superhumps.

Observation data Epoch J2000 Equinox ICRS
- Constellation: Andromeda
- Right ascension: 00^{h} 41^{m} 51.49298^{s}
- Declination: +26° 37′ 21.0438″
- Apparent magnitude (V): 14.3–19.4 variable

Characteristics
- Variable type: Dwarf nova

Astrometry
Proper motion (μ)	RA: 18.319(914) mas/yr Dec.: −18.595(511) mas/yr
Parallax (π)	1.5508±0.6312 mas
Distance	approx. 2,100 ly (approx. 600 pc)

Orbit
Period (P)	1.32 hours
Inclination (i)	45°

Database references
SIMBAD	data

LL Andromedae (often abbreviated to LL And) is a dwarf nova in the constellation Andromeda, discovered during an outburst in 1979. Its typical apparent visual magnitude is 19.4, but undergoes outbursts events when can reach a peak magnitude of 14.3. Since this magnitude is reached during the most powerful outbursts, while less bright outbursts can occur, it is classified as a SU Ursae Majoris variable.

The variability of LL Andromedae is similar to the WZ Sagittae type of dwarf novae. Those have a long outbursts cycle (they were observed only in 1979, 1994 and 2004) and superhumps can be observed with a short periodic modulation. It was observed also a periodicity of 1.32 hours, which is attributed to the orbital period of the system. However, in comparison to WZ Sagittae, the outburst amplitude is small and the superoutbursts duration is short.

Little is known about the components of LL Andromedae because it is a faint object; one of the two components is likely an accreting white dwarf like in all dwarf novae. A brown dwarf donor has been proposed, but the short periodicity of superhumps hints instead at the presence of a massive companion.
