= RX Andromedae =

Cataclysmic variable star system in the constellation Andromeda

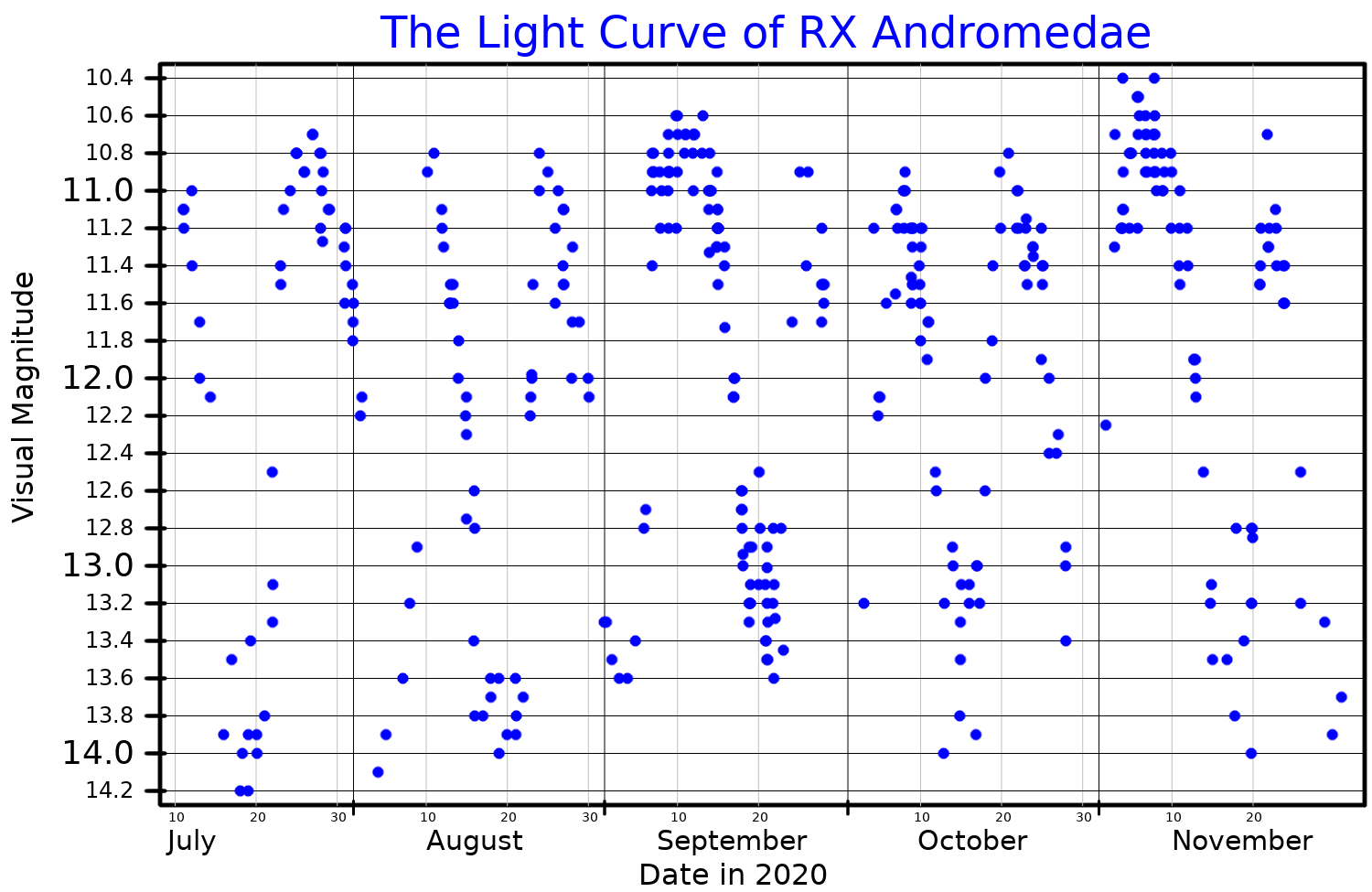
- The visual band light curve of RX Andromedae, from AAVSO data

Observation data Epoch J2000 Equinox ICRS
- Constellation: Andromeda
- Right ascension: 01^{h} 04^{m} 35.53795^{s}
- Declination: +41° 17′ 57.7842″
- Apparent magnitude (V): 10.2 to 15.1

Characteristics
- Spectral type: pec(UG)
- B−V color index: −0.4556
- Variable type: UGZ

Astrometry
Radial velocity (R_{v})	−12 km/s
Proper motion (μ)	RA: 3.293 mas/yr Dec.: −22.604 mas/yr
Parallax (π)	5.0510±0.0269 mas
Distance	646 ± 3 ly (198 ± 1 pc)

Orbit
Period (P)	5.075 hours

Details

White dwarf
Mass	0.8 M_{☉}
Surface gravity (log g)	8.2 cgs
Temperature	40,000 - 45,000 K
Rotational velocity (v sin i)	200 km/s

Donor star
Surface gravity (log g)	4.5 cgs
Temperature	3,500 K
Metallicity	+0.07

Other designations
- 2MASS J01043553+4117577, TYC 2807-1623-1

Database references
SIMBAD	data

RX Andromedae is a variable star in the constellation of Andromeda. Although it is classified as a dwarf nova of the Z Camelopardalis (UGZ) type, it has shown low-luminosity periods typical of VY Sculptoris stars. However, for most of the time it varies from an apparent visual magnitude of 15.1 at minimum brightness to a magnitude of 10.2 at maximum brightness, with a period of approximately 13 days.

== System ==
RX Andromedae is a cataclysmic variable system, where a white dwarf with a mass of 0.8 M_{☉} and an M2 main sequence star are rotating around their center of mass. The main sequence star is overfilling its Roche lobe, so the white dwarf is stripping away matter from the companion star and accreting it through an accretion disk.

== Variability ==
In 1904, English amateur astronomer Arthur Stanley Williams discovered RX Amdromedae, and he observed it visually (with a 6.5 inch reflector) from late 1904 until early 1905. He initially believed it to be a Cepheid variable, but after examining images of the star on photographic plates dating back to late 1899, he concluded it was a U Geminorum variable. He published its variable star designation in 1906.

Like the Z Camelopardalis variables, RX Andromedae shows some periods of roughly constant luminosity and others where its brightness oscillates between a magnitude of 10.2 at its maximum and one of 15.1 at its minimum. However, between 1996 and 1997 it was stuck at its minimum brightness like cataclysmic variables of VY Sculptoris type, before going back to the usual behaviour. This places RX Andromedae in a transitional state between those two kind of objects. The white dwarf and its accretion disk seems to be entirely responsible for this variability, and it's driven by changes in the accretion rate of the white dwarf.

== Spectrum ==
RX Andromedae has been extensively studied in optical and ultraviolet. It's also one of the few dwarf nova systems that have been detected at radio wavelengths.
