= UV Persei =

Cataclysmic variable star in the constellation Perseus

Observation data Epoch J2000 Equinox ICRS
- Constellation: Perseus
- Right ascension: 02^{h} 10^{m} 08.27^{s}
- Declination: +57° 11′ 20.9″
- Apparent magnitude (V): 11.0–18.2 (range)

Characteristics
- Spectral type: Dwarf nova (SU UMa-type)
- Variable type: UGSU

Astrometry
Distance	249±9 pc

Other designations
- UV Per, AAVSO 0203+56A

UV Persei (UV Per) is a cataclysmic variable star of the SU Ursae Majoris subclass of dwarf novae, located in the constellation Perseus. It is catalogued in the General Catalogue of Variable Stars and in the American Association of Variable Star Observers' International Variable Star Index (VSX), which lists its visual magnitude as ranging from about 11.0 at the peak of an outburst to about 18.2 at minimum light, with a period of 0.06489 days (about 93 minutes). Gaia Data Release 2 measured a parallax of 3.9883 ± 0.1321 milliarcseconds for the star, corresponding to a distance of about 249 ± 9 parsecs (roughly 810 light-years).

Like other SU UMa-type dwarf novae, UV Persei exhibits two kinds of eruptions: frequent, shorter normal outbursts, and rarer, brighter and longer superoutbursts during which superhumps – periodic photometric oscillations with a period slightly longer than the orbital period – appear in its light curve.

== Discovery and naming ==
UV Persei was discovered by the British amateur astronomer Charles Robert d'Esterre. Observing with a 15-inch reflector at his private observatory in Tatsfield, Surrey, d'Esterre found the star on a Voigtländer-lens photographic plate taken on 13 November 1911, estimating its outburst magnitude at 10.5; a further plate on 21 November showed it had already faded to about 11.5th magnitude.

The discovery was initially suspected to be a nova, since the star faded rapidly and by February–March 1912 appeared only as a faint nebulous image. A subsequent search of the Harvard College Observatory photographic plate archive by Annie Jump Cannon found no trace of the star on 67 plates fainter than 14th magnitude, but showed it at 11th magnitude on three earlier dates – 1896 October 30, 1899 September 17, and 1902 January 28 – indicating recurrent outbursts rather than a genuine nova, and suggesting it was a star "of the U Geminorum type" (i.e. a dwarf nova). The star's variable-star designation was published in this same 1914 name-list of newly discovered variable stars by Nils Christofer Dunér, Ernst Hartwig, and Gustav Müller, which also cites the original discovery announcement as Astronomische Nachrichten No. 4545.

On deep photographic plates taken in early 1912, d'Esterre also reported faint nebulosity surrounding the star, raising speculation that it might be linked to a nova with a fading light echo, as had been observed around GK Persei in 1901. D'Esterre's original plates, rediscovered in the Royal Astronomical Society library in 1994, were re-examined by Mobberley, Barber and Hurst for their 1997 study; they found no evidence of genuine nebulosity and concluded that d'Esterre's observation had been an artefact of photographic grain near an unrelated faint double star close to UV Persei's position. The discoverer's own name – recorded ambiguously in some later variable-star catalogues, which listed him under his birth name "Charles Roberts" – was likewise clarified in this 1997 study.

== Orbital period ==
The binary's orbital period was spectroscopically determined by John R. Thorstensen and Christopher J. Taylor and published in 1997, as part of a study that also derived orbital periods for the related dwarf novae VY Aquarii and V1504 Cygni. They found P_{orb} = 0.06489 ± 0.00011 days (93.44 ± 0.16 minutes) from radial velocities taken near minimum light. During a 1994 outburst, AAVSO observers reported superhumps with a period of about 1 hour 35.9 minutes (0.0666 days), consistent with the slightly longer superhump period expected relative to the orbital period in SU UMa systems.

== Outburst history ==
UV Persei has been repeatedly monitored by AAVSO observers during outbursts:

- In December 1991, the star brightened to about 11th magnitude and remained brighter than 13th magnitude for roughly 10 days, prompting an AAVSO alert under the designation "0203+56A UV Persei".
- In April 1993, it reached about 12th magnitude and stayed brighter than 13th magnitude for about 3 days.
- In late May and early June 1994, the star underwent another bright outburst, possibly a superoutburst, reaching about 10th–11th magnitude; observers were asked to search for superhumps.

=== Astro-2 observations ===
In March 1995, an outburst of UV Persei was observed as part of NASA's Astro-2 mission, flown aboard Space Shuttle Endeavour during mission STS-67, which carried a suite of ultraviolet telescopes. AAVSO observers were recruited to monitor the star photometrically in support of the mission's ultraviolet observations.
