= AR Andromedae =

Star in the constellation Andromeda

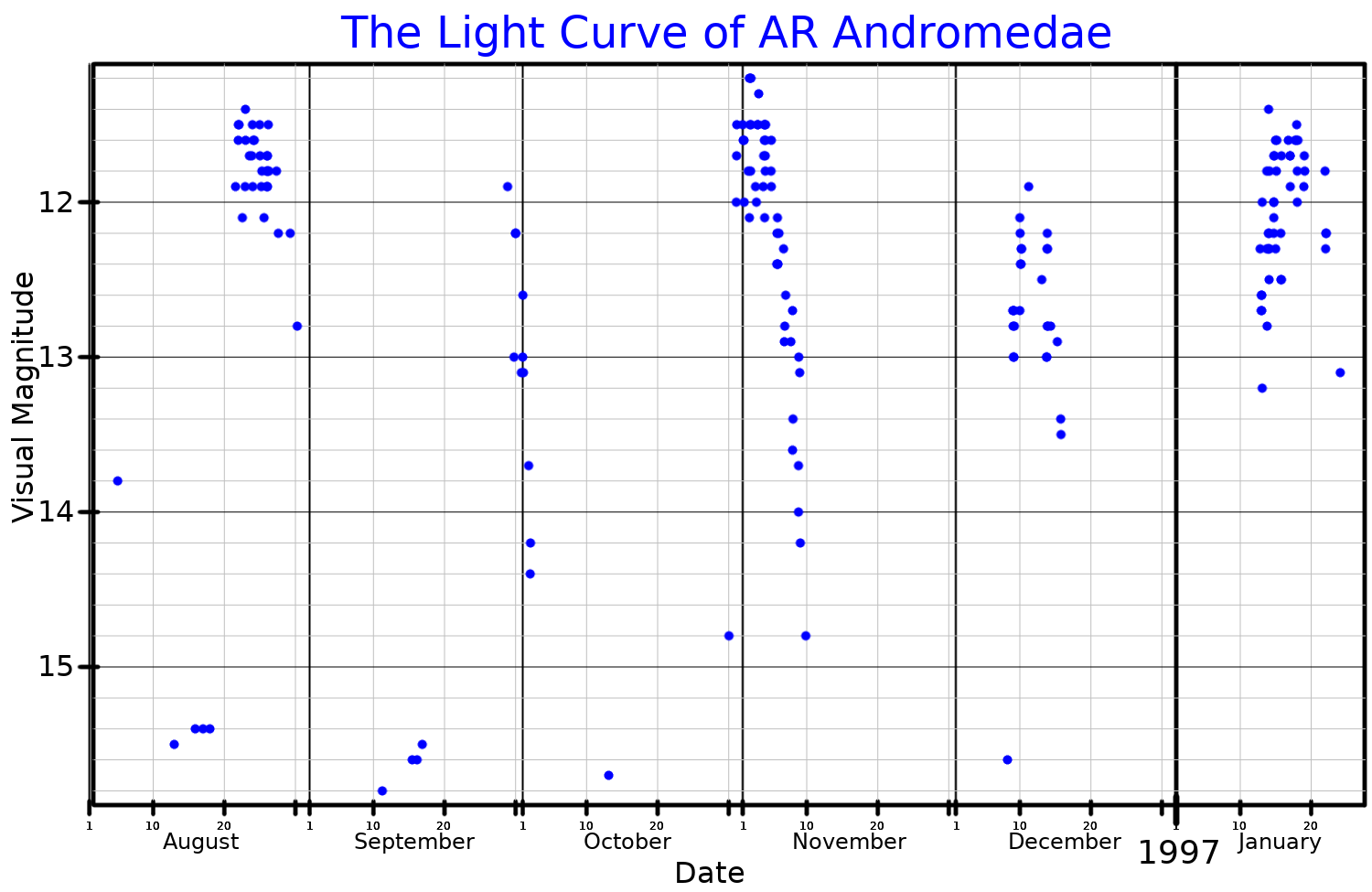
- A visual band light curve for AR Andromedae, from AAVSO data, showing five outbursts.

Observation data Epoch J2000 Equinox ICRS
- Constellation: Andromeda
- Right ascension: 01^{h} 45^{m} 03.27155^{s}
- Declination: +37° 58′ 33.2379″
- Apparent magnitude (V): 11.0 – 17.6 variable

Characteristics
- Spectral type: pec(UG)
- Apparent magnitude (B): 12.8
- Apparent magnitude (V): 11.00
- Apparent magnitude (G): 16.3185
- Apparent magnitude (J): 14.589
- Apparent magnitude (H): 13.996
- Apparent magnitude (K): 13.730
- Variable type: UGSS

Astrometry
Proper motion (μ)	RA: 5.431±0.046 mas/yr Dec.: −7.249±0.059 mas/yr
Parallax (π)	2.4070±0.0666 mas
Distance	1,360 ± 40 ly (420 ± 10 pc)

Orbit
Period (P)	0.16302±0.00032 days
Periastron epoch (T)	HJD 2450005.6924±0.0021
Semi-amplitude (K_{1}) (primary)	91±7 km/s

Other designations
- 2MASS J01450327+3756334, CRTS J014503.3+375633

Database references
SIMBAD	data

AR Andromedae (AR And) is a dwarf nova of the SS Cygni type in the constellation Andromeda. Its typical apparent visual magnitude is 17.6, but increases up to 11.0 magnitude during outbursts. The outbursts occur approximately every 23 days.

== System ==
Dwarf novae systems are made up by a classical star with a white dwarf companion. By measuring the Doppler shift of spectral lines, it was found to have an orbital period of 3.91 hours. The accretion disk around the white dwarf seems to be axisymmetric and devoid of structure.

== Variability ==
AR Andromedae was first listed as a variable star by Frank Elmore Ross in 1929, based on observations in 1907 (when the star was too faint to detect) and 1927 (when the star had flared to magnitude 12). It was initially classified as a Mira variable star. In 1934 it was given the variable star designation AR Andromedae.

The light emitted by dwarf novae like AR Andromedae comes entirely from the accretion disc and the white dwarf; the luminosity increase during outbursts is typically induced by a variation in the accretion rate of the white dwarf. The outbursts are unusually frequent, with 19 outbursts detected by 2016.

== Spectrum ==
The spectral type of AR Andromedae is classified as peculiar of the U Geminorum type, since the spectrum is not a typical stellar blackbody. It also shows strong emission lines of the first two Balmer series lines as well as HeI ones. In addition, an unusually strong FeII line with other possible weak lines of the same origin were also reported.
