= IW Andromedae =

Star system in the constellation Andromeda

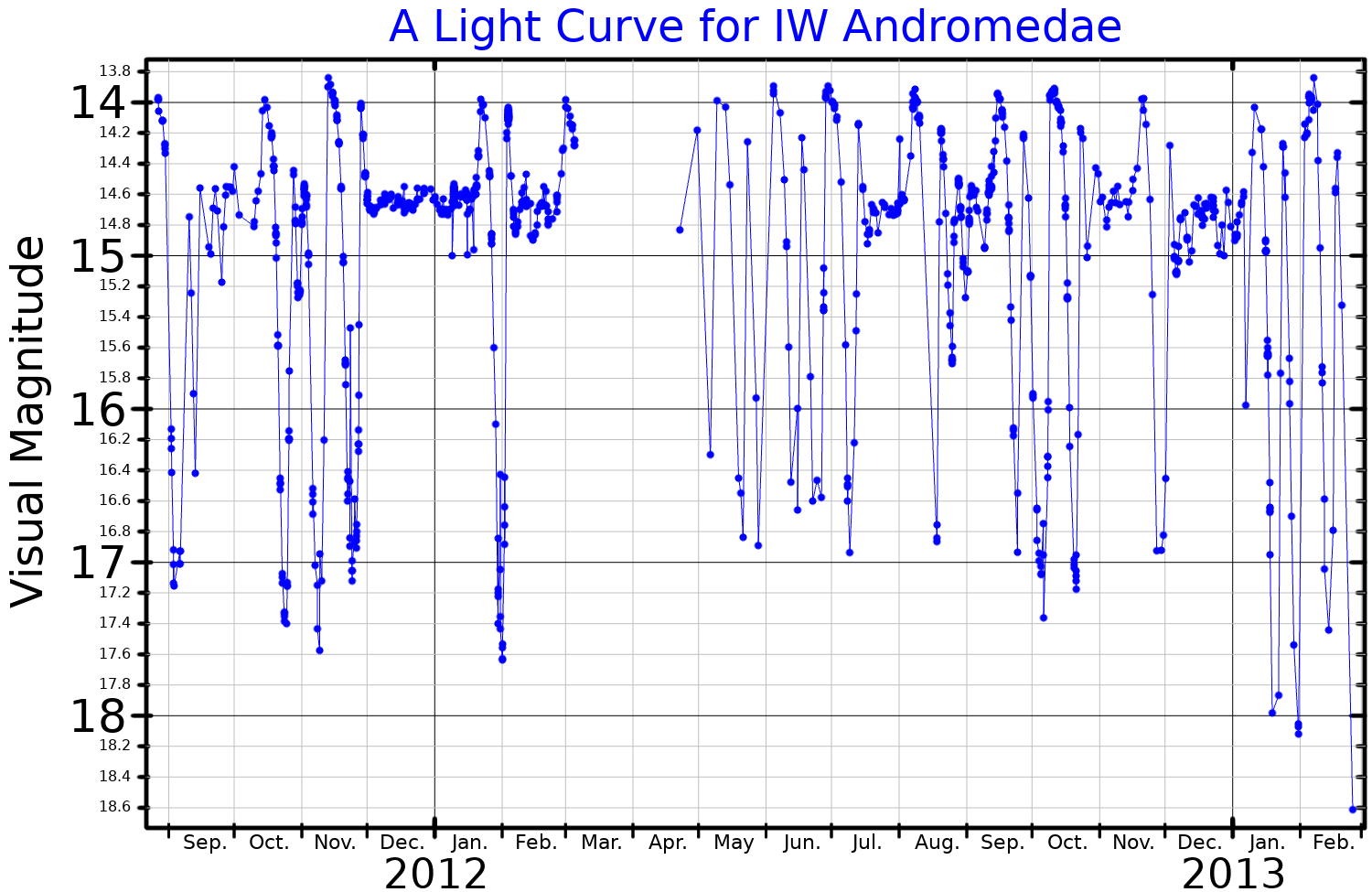
- A visual band light curve for IW Andromedae, plotted from AAVSO data

Observation data Epoch J2000 Equinox J2000
- Constellation: Andromeda
- Right ascension: 01^{h} 01^{m} 08.907^{s}
- Declination: 43° 23′ 25.79″
- Apparent magnitude (V): 13.7 to 17.3

Characteristics
- Spectral type: sdOB
- Variable type: Z Cam(?)

Astrometry
Proper motion (μ)	RA: +2.471 mas/yr Dec.: −5.904 mas/yr
Parallax (π)	1.1413±0.0326 mas
Distance	2,860 ± 80 ly (880 ± 30 pc)

Details

White dwarf
Mass	0.75 M_{☉}
Radius	0.015 R_{☉}
Temperature	25,000 K

Donor star
Mass	0.27 M_{☉}

Other designations
- IW And, 2MASS J01010890+4323257, AAVSO 0055+42

Database references
SIMBAD	data

IW Andromedae is a binary star system in the northern constellation of Andromeda, abbreviated IW And. It is the prototype of a class of variable stars known as IW And variables, which is an anomalous sub-class of the Z Camelopardalis (Z Cam) variables. The brightness of this system ranges from an apparent visual magnitude of 13.7 down to 17.3, which requires a telescope to view. The system is located at a distance of approximately 2,860 light years from the Sun based on parallax measurements.

The irregular variability of this star was discovered by L. Meinunger in 1975. The spectra was found to resemble a blue–hued OB star with some peculiarities. It is a confirmed cataclysmic variable (CV) but its properties differ markedly from other sub-classes of that type. The photometric behavior of the star is dissimilar to that of a dwarf or polar nova as it shows rapid brightening of up to three magnitudes in periods of around a day, but stays in a low excitement state about 72% of the time. Evidence for weak emission of the hydrogen–alpha line was discovered by W. Liu and associates in 1999.

This is a close binary system with an orbital period of 223 minutes (3.7 hours). The primary component is a white dwarf star with 75% of the mass of the Sun. The secondary component has 27% of the Sun's mass and is overflowing its Roche lobe, resulting in mass transfer to an accretion disk orbiting the primary. The accretion rate for the primary is 3×10^{−9} M_{☉}·yr^{−1}.

T. Kato and associates in 2003 found the light curve matched a Z Cam variable, with the previously observed inactive states being caused by a characteristic standstill. The duty cycle of its standstill is unusually long for a variable of this class. Outbursts during these standstills may be explained by flares on the secondary, which result in brief surges in mass transfer.

Other variables displaying IW And–type behavior have since been discovered, including HO Puppis, BC Cassiopeiae, IM Eridani, V507 Cygni, and FY Vulpecula.
