= ER Ursae Majoris =

Variable binary star system in the constellation Ursa Major

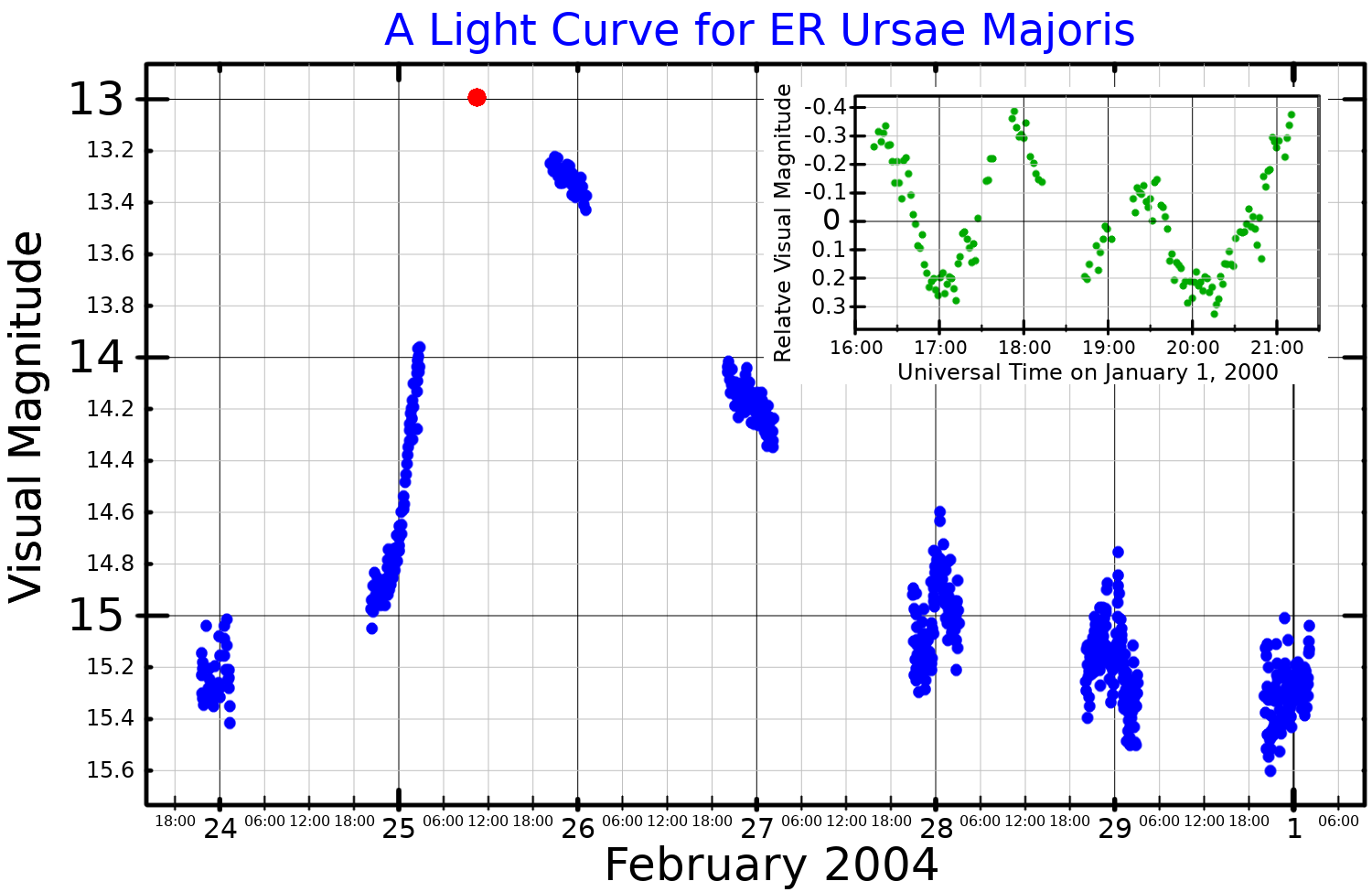
- A visual band light curve for ER Ursae Majoris. The main plot shows a normal outburst in 2004, with the estimated value for the unobserved maximum plotted in red. The inset plot shows superhump oscillations. Adapted from Zhao et al. (2006).

Observation data Epoch J2000 Equinox J2000
- Constellation: Ursa Major
- Right ascension: 09^{h} 47^{m} 11.941^{s}
- Declination: +51° 54′ 08.95″
- Apparent magnitude (V): 12.4 to 15.2

Characteristics
- Variable type: Dwarf nova(?)

Astrometry
Proper motion (μ)	RA: 33.659 mas/yr Dec.: −6.209 mas/yr
Parallax (π)	2.8039±0.0205 mas
Distance	1,163 ± 9 ly (357 ± 3 pc)

Orbit
Period (P)	0.06366±0.00003 d
Eccentricity (e)	0.00 (assumed)
Inclination (i)	18–50°
Periastron epoch (T)	2,449,740.0637±0.0008 HJD
Argument of periastron (ω) (secondary)	0.00 (assumed)°
Semi-amplitude (K_{1}) (primary)	48±4 km/s

Details

White dwarf
Mass	1.0±0.2 M_{☉}
Temperature	32,000 K

Donor star
Mass	0.10 M_{☉}

Other designations
- PG 0943+521, ER UMa, AAVSO 0939+52, GSC 03439-00550, 2MASS J09471193+5154089

Database references
SIMBAD	data

ER Ursae Majoris is a variable star in the northern circumpolar constellation of Ursa Major, abbreviated ER UMa. It is a prototype system for a subclass of SU Ursae Majoris dwarf novae. The system ranges in brightness from a peak apparent visual magnitude of 12.4 down to 15.2, which is too faint to be visible to the naked eye. The distance to this system, based on parallax measurements, is approximately 1,163 light years.

This system was identified as an ultraviolet excess object as part of the Palomar-Green (PG) survey by R. F. Green and associate in 1986. It was given the catalog identifier PG 0943+521, and was confirmed to be cataclysmic variable. In 1992, it was determined this is a dwarf nova that ranges in brightness from magnitude 12.3 down to 15.2. F. A. Ringwald in 1993 found a candidate orbital period of 0.1997 days based on radial velocity variation, but with some uncertainty.

In 1995, T. Kato and C. Kunjaya confirmed this is a SU Ursae Majoris-type dwarf nova, and noted the unusual nature of this system, finding it has a long superoutburst lasting about 20 days and the supercycle (the time between superoutbursts) is very short at around 43 days. Large amplitude superhumps were found to occur near the start of a superoutburst, with a brightness increase of around 0.35 magnitude. The properties of the system suggest a high mass transfer rate and the white dwarf component is hotter than in other typical dwarf novae. During periods of quiescence, the accretion rate is 7.3×10^{−11} M_{☉}·yr^{−1}.
