= DW Cancri =

Variable star in constellation Cancer

Observation data Epoch J2000.0 Equinox ICRS
- Constellation: Cancer
- Right ascension: 07^{h} 58^{m} 53.04^{s}
- Declination: +16° 16′ 45.2″
- Apparent magnitude (V): 11.36 - 16.3

Characteristics
- Evolutionary stage: White dwarf + Red dwarf
- Variable type: U Gem

Astrometry
Radial velocity (R_{v})	38.970486 km/s
Proper motion (μ)	RA: -25.973 mas/yr Dec.: -0.142 mas/yr
Parallax (π)	4.8818±0.0395 mas
Distance	668 ± 5 ly (205 ± 2 pc)

Other designations
- DW Cnc, AAVSO 0753+16, TIC 19028616

Database references
SIMBAD	data

DW Cancri (DW Cnc) is a cataclysmic variable (CV) star system located in the constellation of Cancer. It is classified as an intermediate polar (IP), a subtype of magnetic CV characterized by a white dwarf primary with a moderately strong magnetic field that channels accretion from a low-mass companion star. The system exhibits behaviors typical of VY Scl-type variables, including prolonged low states and occasional brightenings. DW Cnc has an orbital period of approximately 86 minutes, placing it below the period gap for CVs.

== Discovery ==
DW Cancri was identified as a potential CV during the Byurakan survey for blue galaxies and quasars, where it appeared as an emission-line object due to strong Balmer series lines in its spectrum. Further spectroscopic confirmation established it as a CV, with initial studies noting its nova-like characteristics and lack of typical dwarf nova outbursts. The system's magnetic nature was inferred from periodic photometric and spectroscopic modulations consistent with an intermediate polar.

== Characteristics ==
DW Cnc is a close binary system consisting of a white dwarf primary and a low-mass main-sequence secondary, likely a red dwarf, from which material is accreted via Roche lobe overflow. The white dwarf's magnetic field, estimated to be moderately strong, disrupts the inner accretion disk and funnels material to its magnetic poles, producing characteristic spin-period modulations.

=== Variability ===
DW Cnc displays two distinct states: a high state at V ≈ 14.5–15 magnitude and prolonged low states ≈2 magnitudes fainter (V ≈ 16.5–17.5), characteristic of VY Scl stars where reduced mass transfer dims the system. In low states, the accretion disk may be depleted, weakening periodic signals like the spin period.

The first observed outburst occurred in 2007, brightening by ≈4 magnitudes to V ≈ 11.36 before fading ≈2.25 magnitudes in 27 hours. More recent observations identified three short high-state outbursts lasting ≈1 day each, with a recurrence time of ≈60 days and amplitude ≈1 magnitude, potentially magnetically gated. These events contrast with the typical quiescence of intermediate polars and suggest episodic mass transfer enhancements.

Kilo-second quasi-periodic oscillations (QPOs) have been detected, with continuous signals over 61 days, interpreted as accretion instabilities or disk modes.
