= Z Cam =

Z Cam may refer to:

- Z Camelopardalis, a dwarf nova in the constellation Camelopardalis
- Z CAM, a brand of cinema cameras and VR cameras by Shenzhen ImagineVision Technology Limited
- ZCam, a brand of 3D time-of-flight camera products in the 2000s by 3DV Systems
