= V572 Velorum =

Nova that occurred in 2025

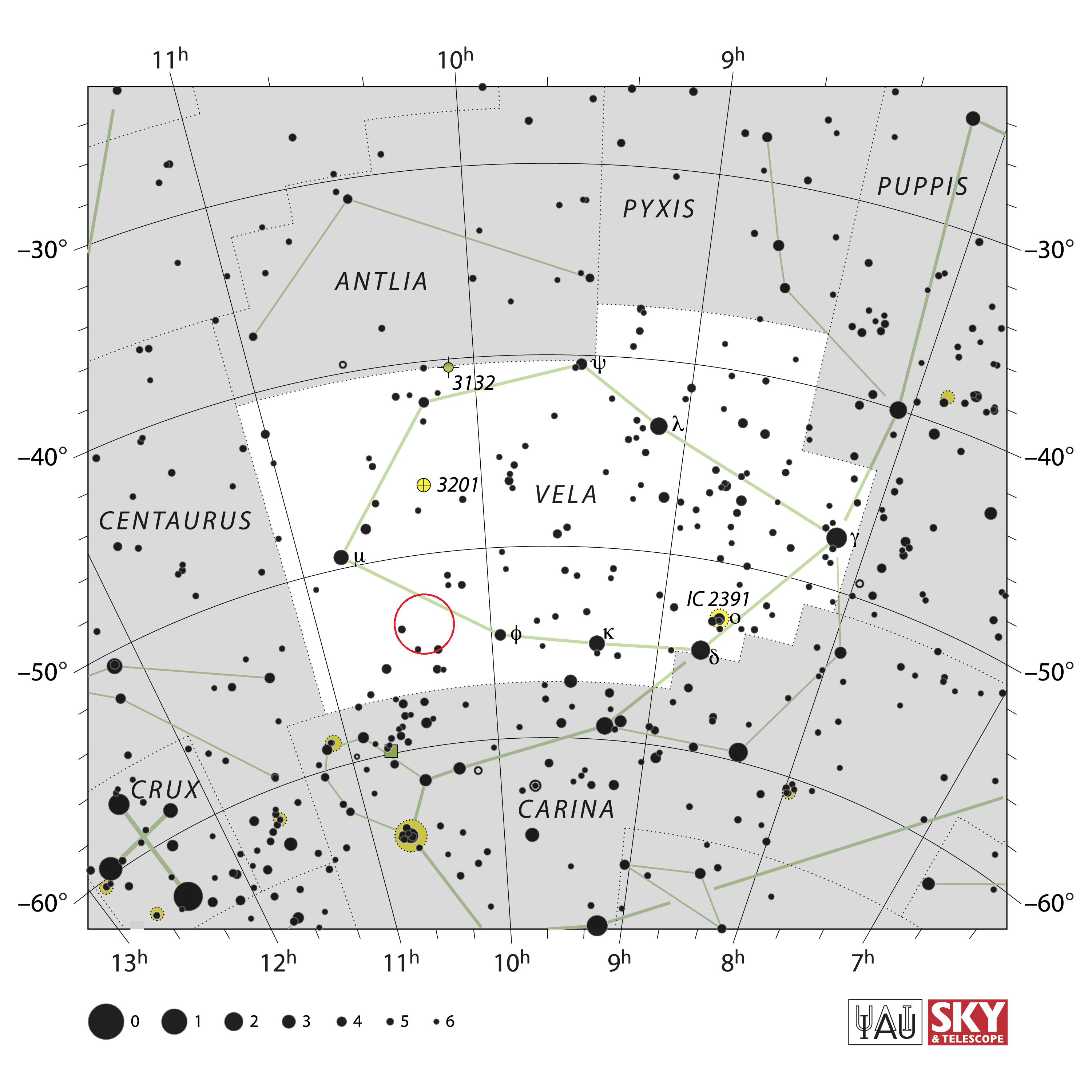
- Approximate location of V572 Velorum (circled in red)

Observation data Epoch J2000.0 Equinox J2000.0 (ICRS)
- Constellation: Vela
- Right ascension: 10^{h} 25^{m} 13.90^{s}
- Declination: −53° 31′ 18.9″
- Apparent magnitude (V): 4.8 – 22.2

Characteristics
- Variable type: Nova + SU UMa dwarf nova

Other designations
- Nova Velorum 2025, PNV J10251200-5331109, V572 Vel

V572 Velorum, also known as Nova Velorum 2025, is a bright nova in the constellation Vela discovered by John Seach, and independently by Andrew Pearce, on 25 June 2025. At the time of its discovery, it had an apparent visual magnitude of 5.7, which is just visible to the naked eye. It reached a peak brightness of 4.8 on June 27. On 15 January 2026, it was reported that the nova had been detected in a precovery image on 20 June 2025 by the SPHEREx space observatory.

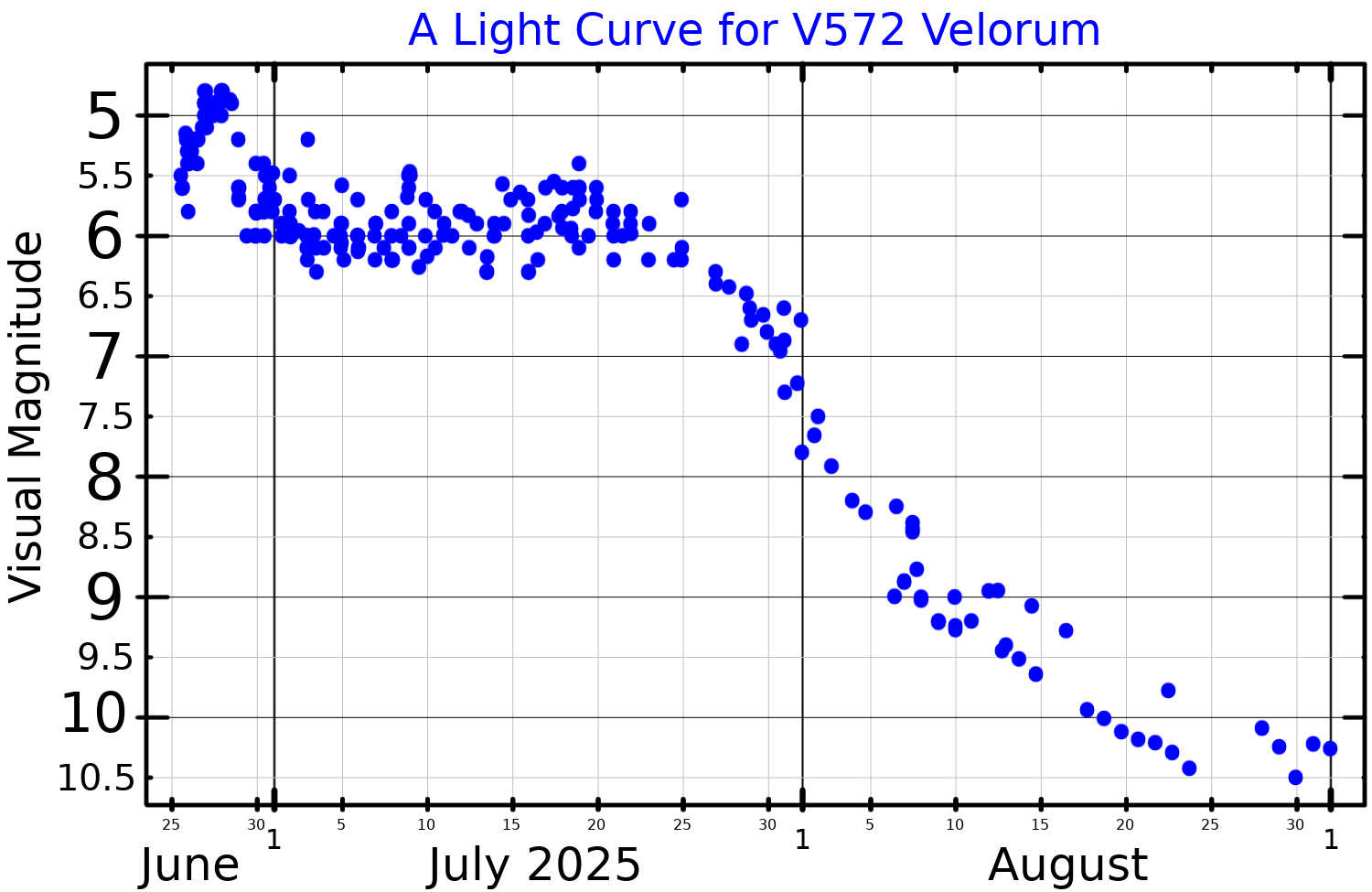
A visual band light curve for V572 Velorum, plotted from AAVSO data

All novae are binary stars, with matter from a "donor" star accreting onto a white dwarf. In the case of V572 Velorum, the orbital period is 0.12317997±0.00000010 days (2.96 h). Observations of the system before the 2025 explosion show the nova has already undergone fainter outbursts with both "long" (over 13 days) and "short" (3 to 4 days) periods. It is thus classified as a dwarf nova of the SU Ursae Majoris variable type. A spectrum taken of 572 Velorum on 30 June 2025 looks typical of a Fe II-type classical nova.

Sequence showing the change in brightness from July 26th to August 7th
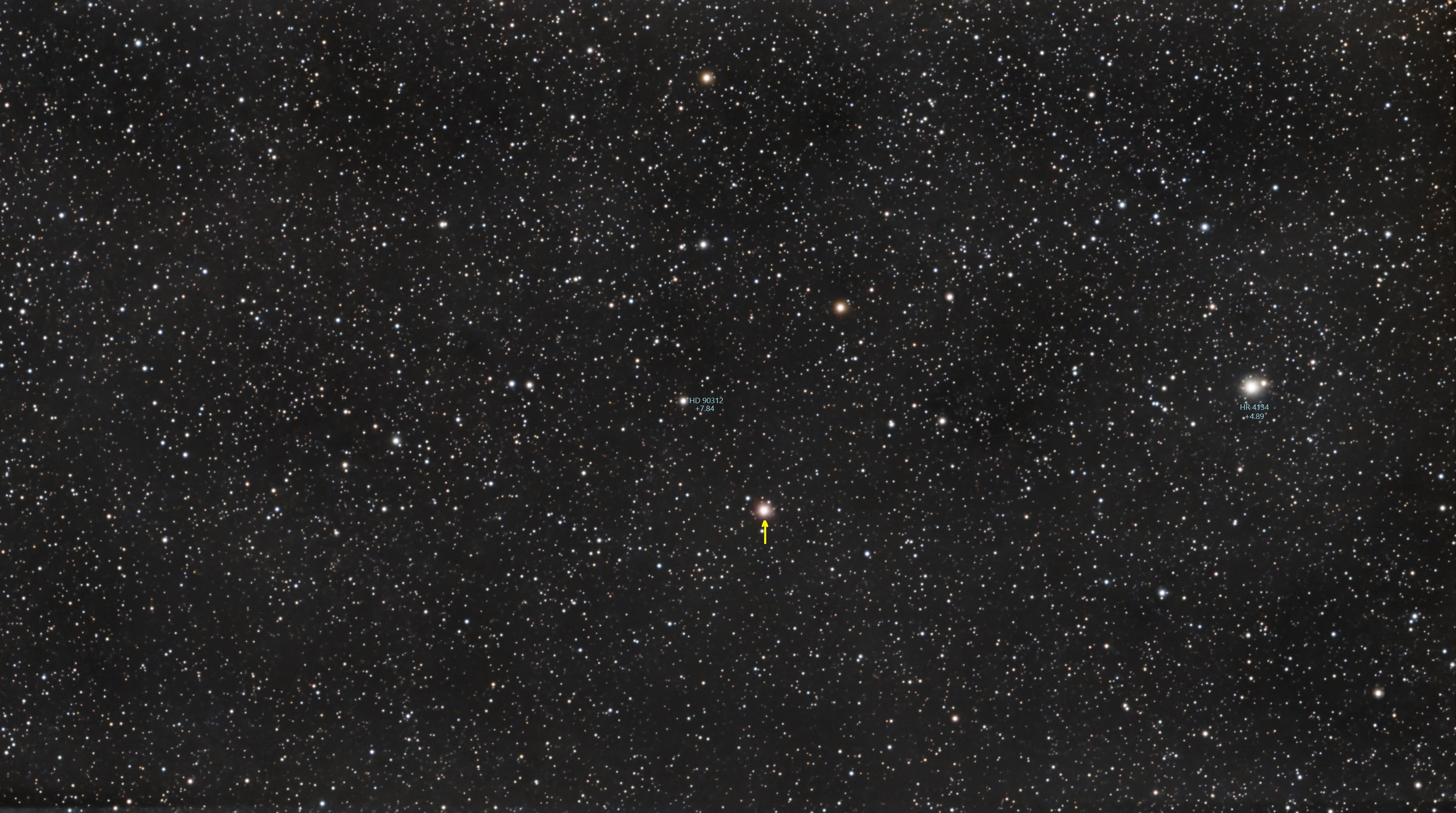
V572 Velorum - Captured in Sydney on 26-Jul-2025

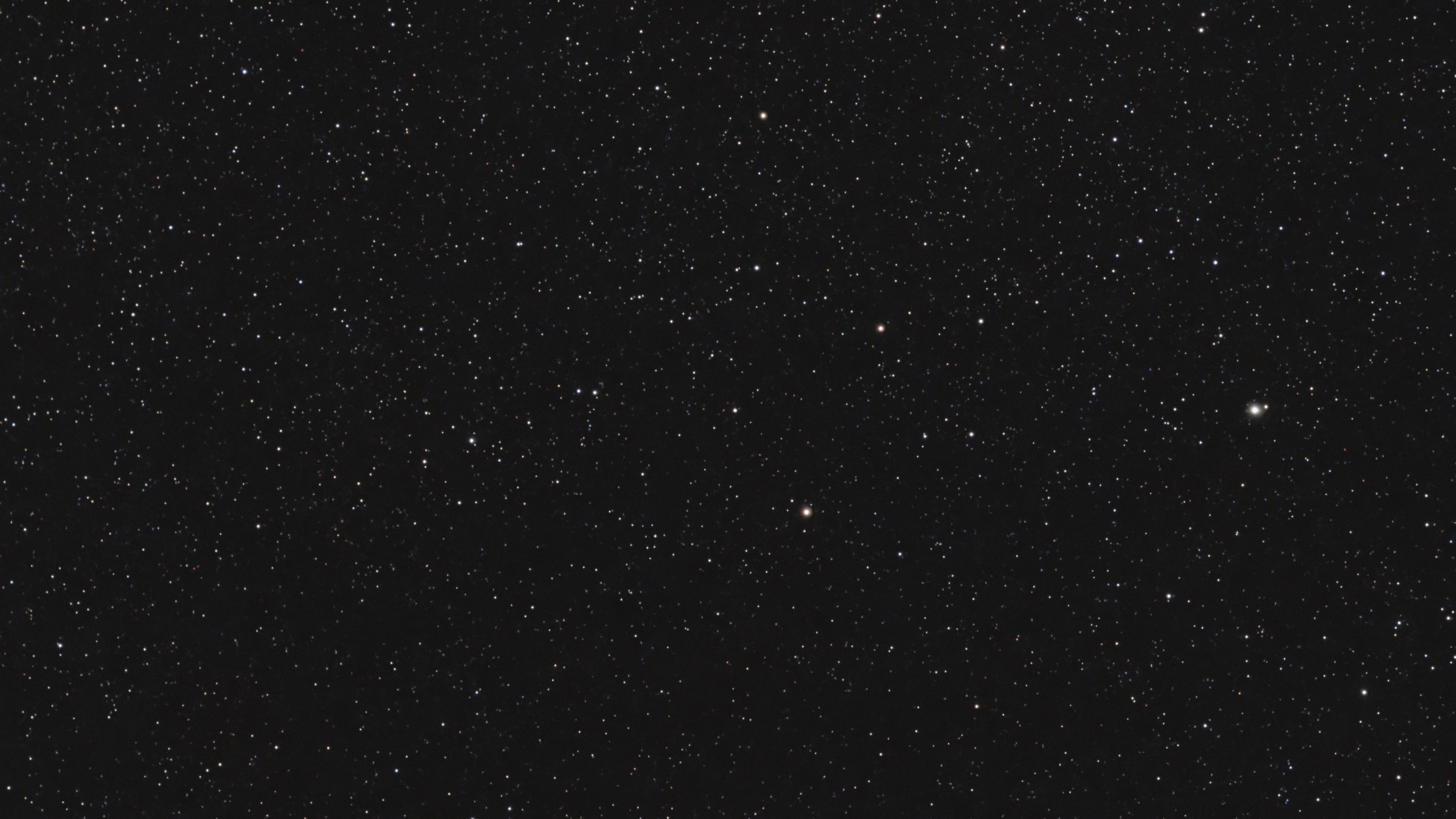
V572 Velorum. Captured from Sydney, July 27, 2025. Single 30-second exposure (no stacking).

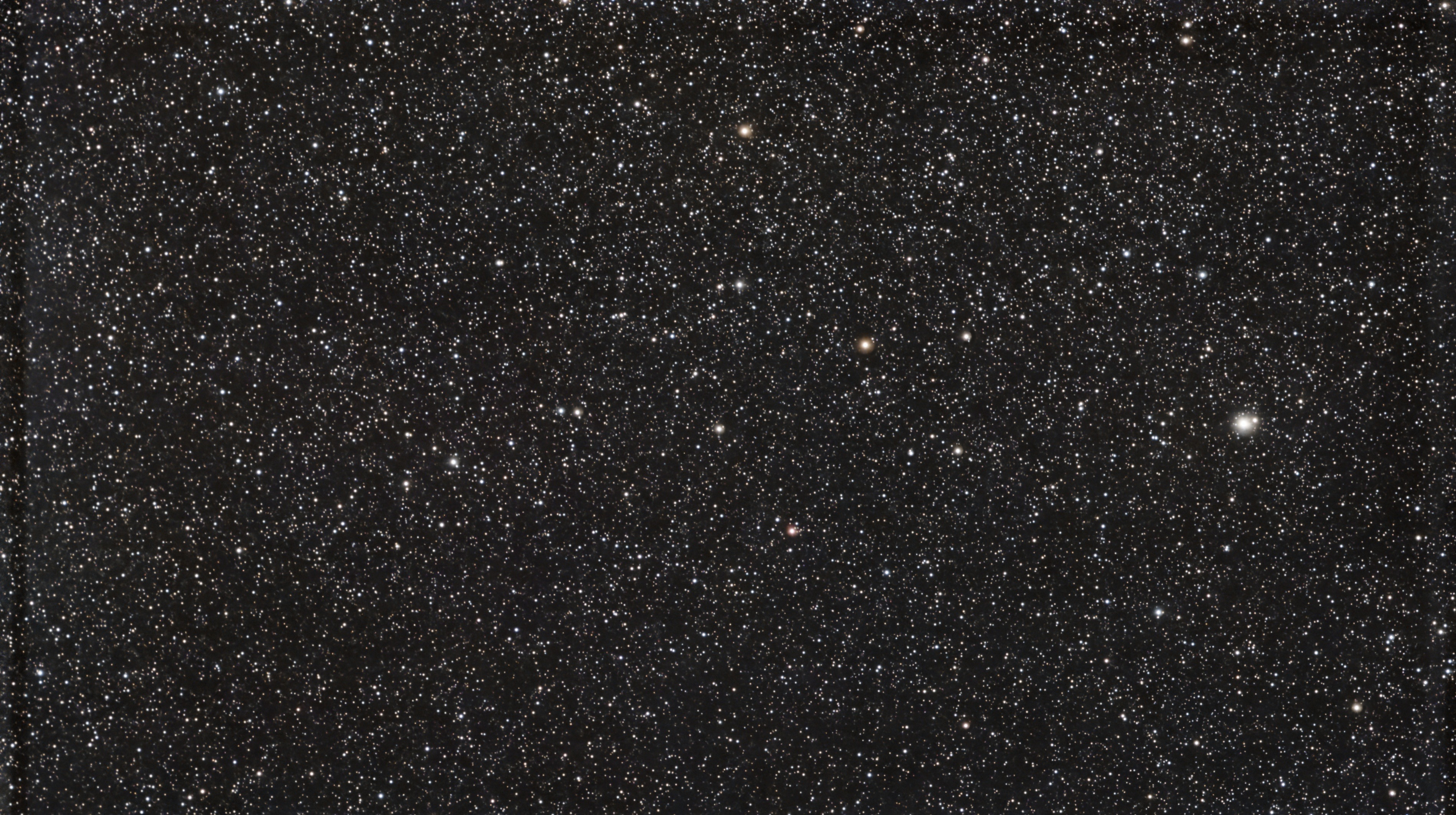
V572 Velorum. Captured from Sydney, Aug 7, 2025. Luminosity had decayed considerably.

== See also ==
- List of novae in the Milky Way galaxy
- Supernova
