= ZTF J1813+4251 =

Stellar binary star system

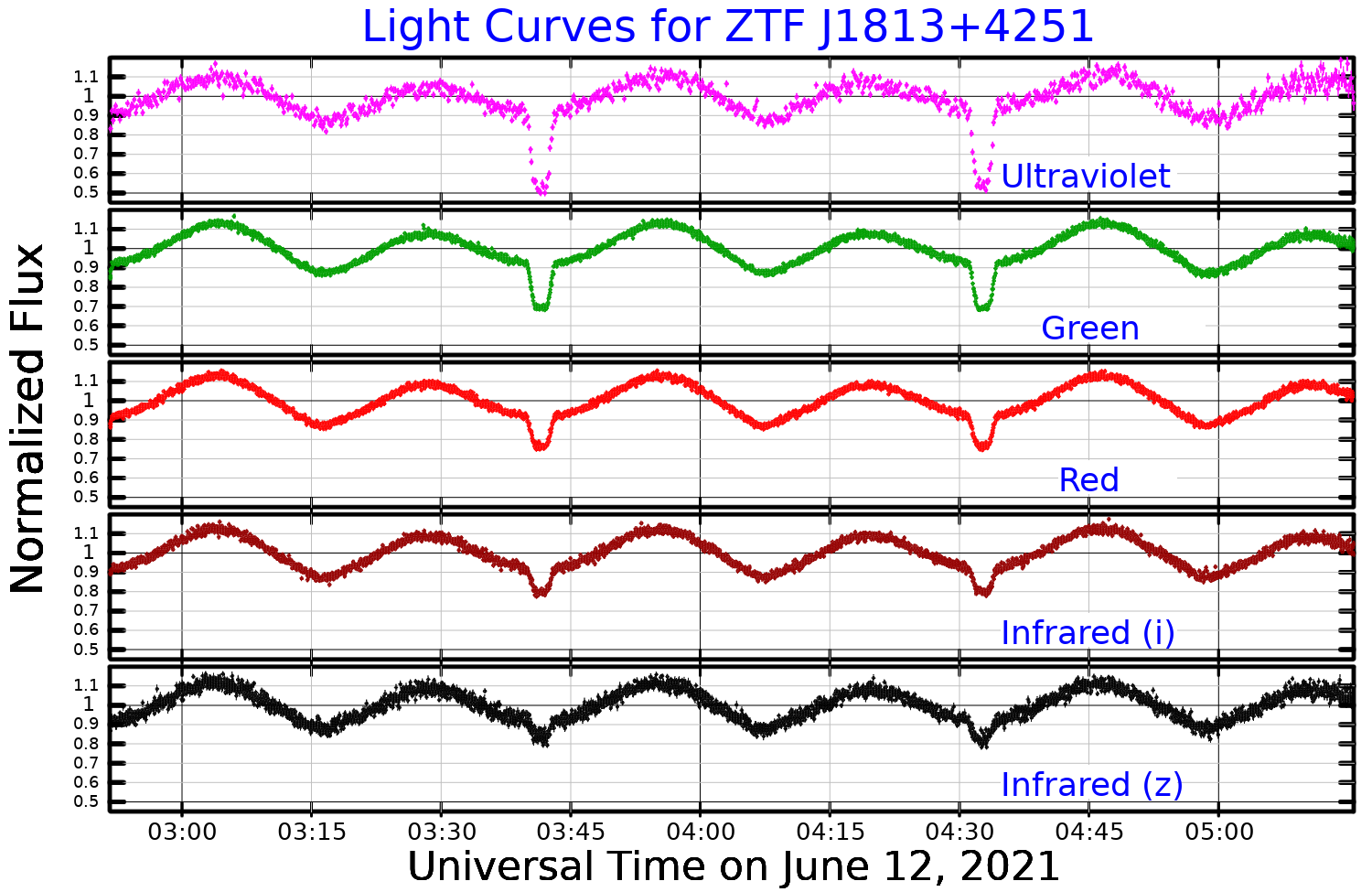
- Light curves for ZTF J1813+4251 in five photometric bands, adapted from Burdge et al. (2022)

Observation data Epoch J2016.0 Equinox J2000.0
- Constellation: Hercules
- Right ascension: 18^{h} 13^{m} 11.13^{s}
- Declination: 42° 51′ 50.4″
- Apparent magnitude (V): 18.72

Astrometry
Radial velocity (R_{v})	461.3 km/s
Proper motion (μ)	RA: −12.317 mas/yr Dec.: −2.656 mas/yr
Parallax (π)	1.1975±0.1551 mas
Distance	approx. 2,700 ly (approx. 800 pc)

Orbit
Period (P)	51.16 min
Semi-major axis (a)	0.4 R_{☉}
Eccentricity (e)	0 (fixed)
Inclination (i)	78.80°
Semi-amplitude (K_{2}) (secondary)	461.3 km/s

Details

White Dwarf
Mass	0.562±0.015 M_{☉}
Radius	0.01374±0.00023 R_{☉}
Surface gravity (log g)	7.9 cgs
Temperature	12600±500 K

Donor
Mass	0.1185±0.0067 M_{☉}
Radius	0.1017±0.0019 R_{☉}
Surface gravity (log g)	5.43 cgs
Temperature	6000±80 K
Rotational velocity (v sin i)	145 km/s

Other designations
- ZTF J1813+4251, Gaia DR3 2113285228603943168

Database references
SIMBAD	data

ZTF J1813+4251 is a binary star system including a star and white dwarf, co-orbiting every 51 minutes, about 3,000 light years away in the constellation of Hercules. It is considered a cataclysmic variable with the white dwarf pulling outer layers of hydrogen from the star onto itself. It has the shortest orbital period of all hydrogen-rich cataclysmic variable stars known. It is predicted that the orbital period will reach a minimum of 18 minutes within 75 million years as the system evolves.

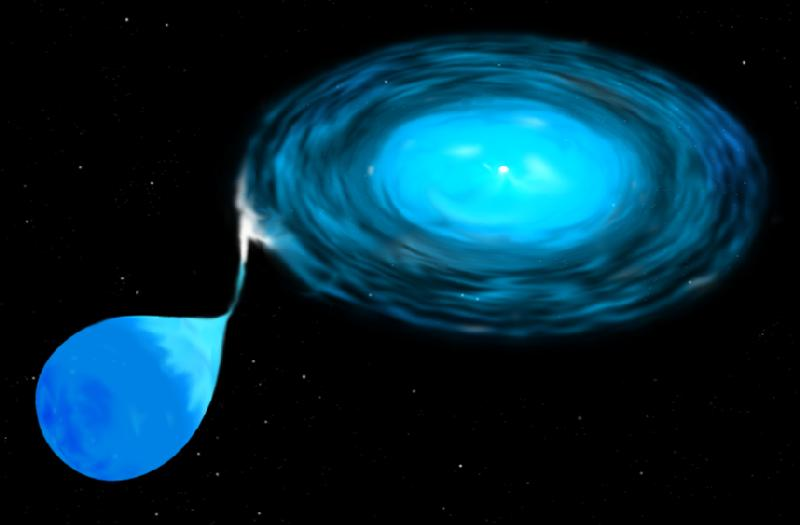
An example artistic impression of a cataclysmic variable star binary

It was identified in 2022 by Kevin Burdge of MIT using a computer algorithm that searched over 1,000 images from the Zwicky Transient Facility, identifying stars that had brightness variability periods around one hour.
