= Z Camelopardalis =

Star in the constellation Camelopardalis

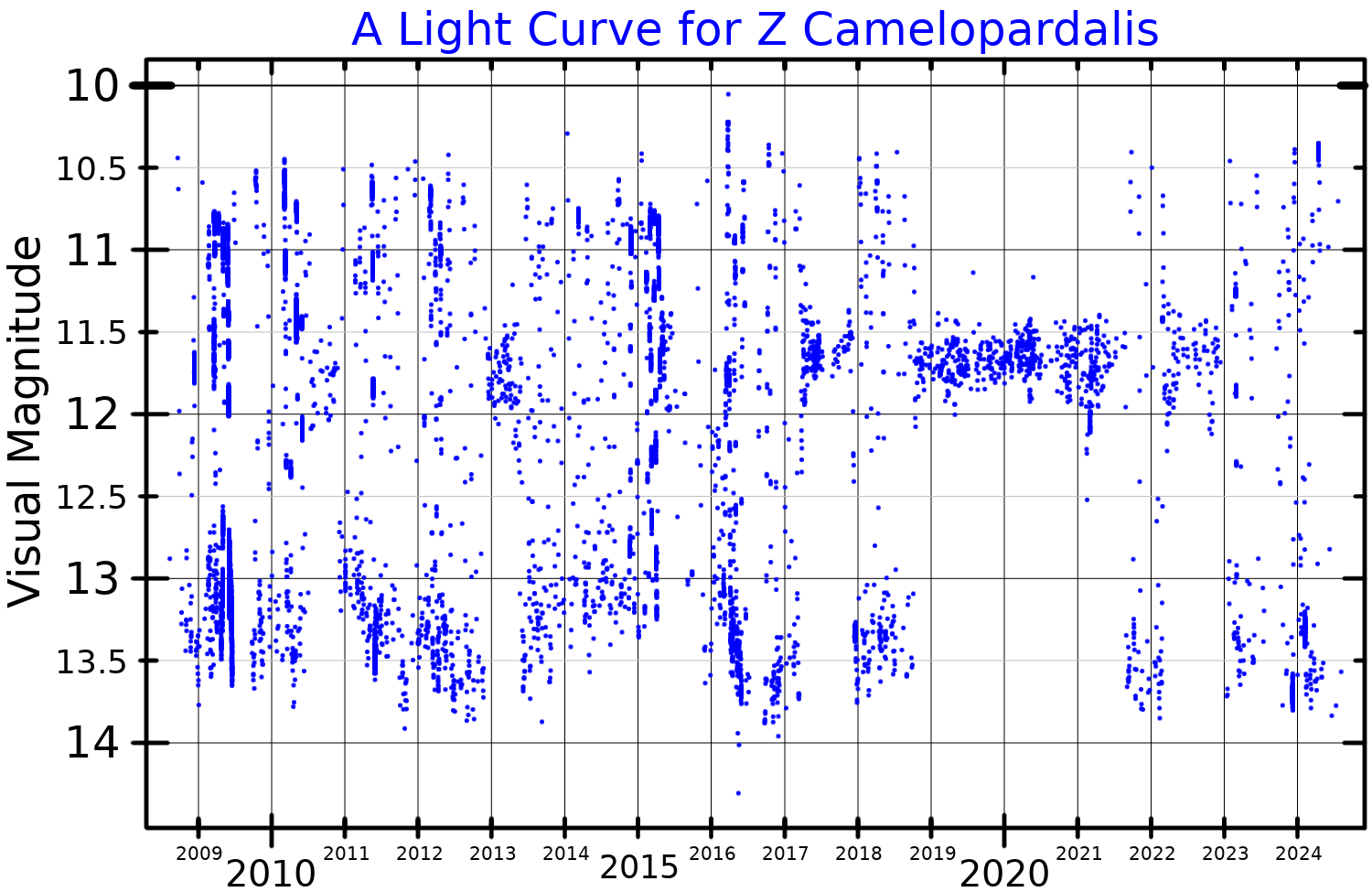
- A visual band light curve for Z Camelopardalis, plotted from AAVSO data

Observation data Epoch J2000.0 Equinox J2000.0 (ICRS)
- Constellation: Camelopardalis
- Right ascension: 08^{h} 25^{m} 13.199^{s}
- Declination: +73° 06′ 39.28″
- Apparent magnitude (V): 9.8 to 14.5

Characteristics
- Spectral type: pec(UG)+G1
- Variable type: UGZ

Astrometry
Radial velocity (R_{v})	−38.0 km/s
Proper motion (μ)	RA: −9.003 mas/yr Dec.: −19.078 mas/yr
Parallax (π)	4.4369±0.0403 mas
Distance	735 ± 7 ly (225 ± 2 pc)

Other designations
- Z Cam, 2MASS J08251318+7306391, AAVSO 0814+73

Database references
SIMBAD	data

Z Camelopardalis (Z Cam) is a cataclysmic variable star system in the northern constellation of Camelopardalis. It has an apparent visual magnitude which varies between 9.8 and 14.5. This system is the prototype star for the family of Z Camelopardalis variable stars: dwarf novae with standstills at a brightness intermediate between their maxima and minima. It may have been the "guest star" that was recorded by Chinese astrologers in the autumn of 77 BCE, but a 2024 study argues that this guest star was likely a comet, while one observed in 369 CE may have been Z Camelopardalis.

Z Camelopardalis was discovered photographically in 1904 by Henry Park Hollis during work for the Astrographic Catalogue. It is surrounded by an extensive shell thought to have been ejected in a nova explosion, the largest known of its type. The size and expansion of this shell sets a firm lower limit since the last eruption of at least 220 years.

== Gallery ==
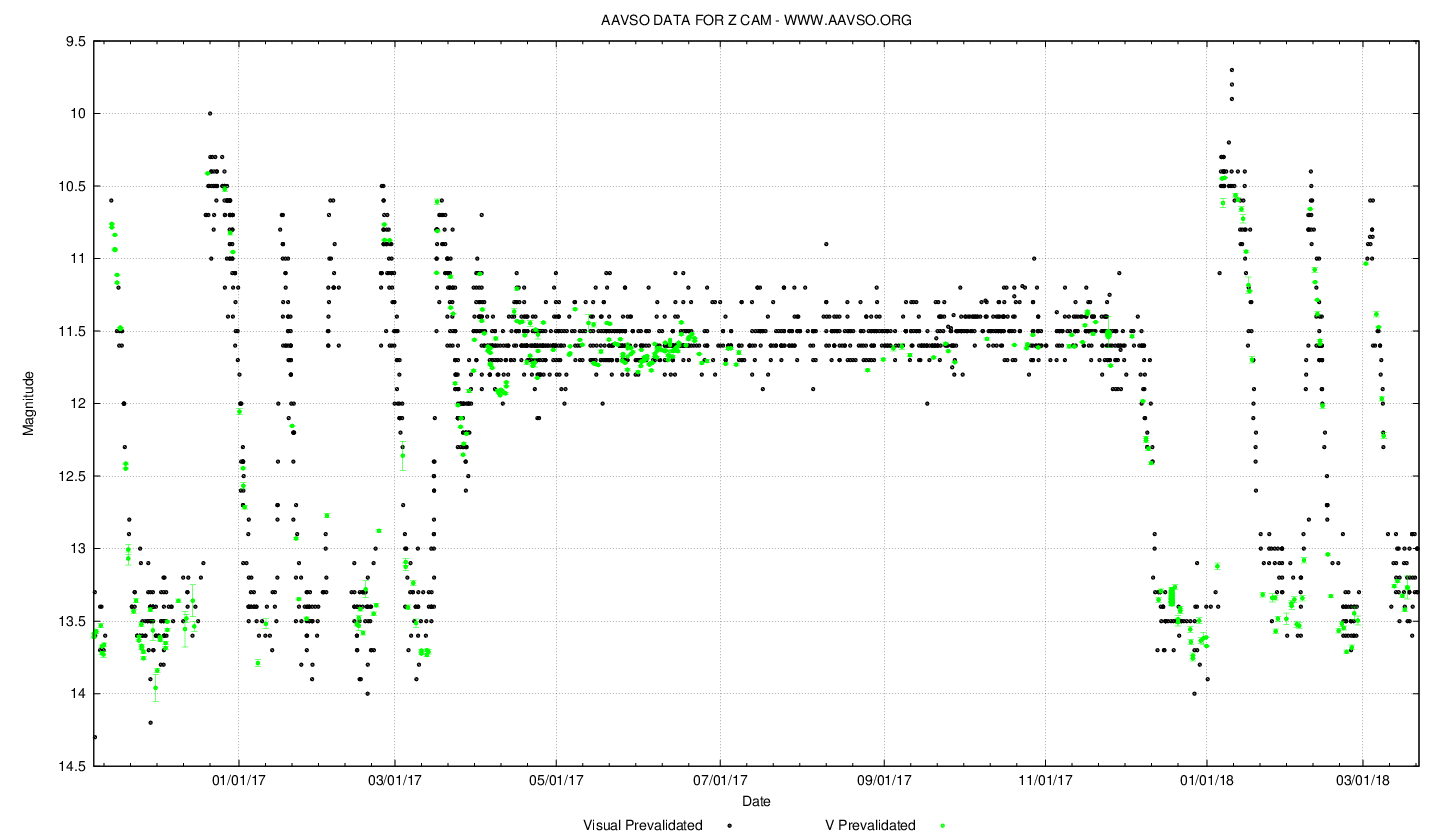
Z Camelopardalis light curve showing a characteristic standstill interrupting the otherwise regular eruptions

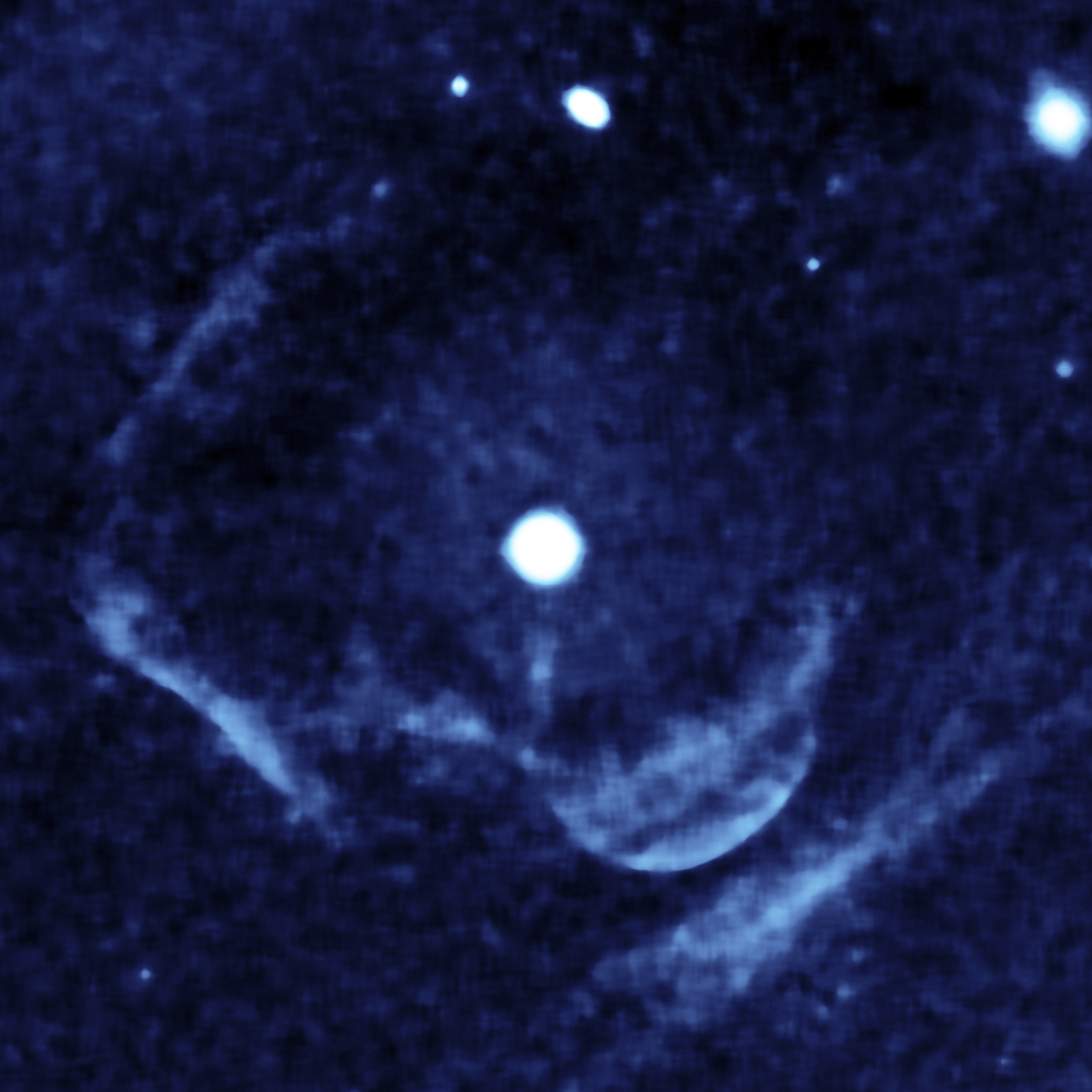
Gas shell Around Z Camelopardalis

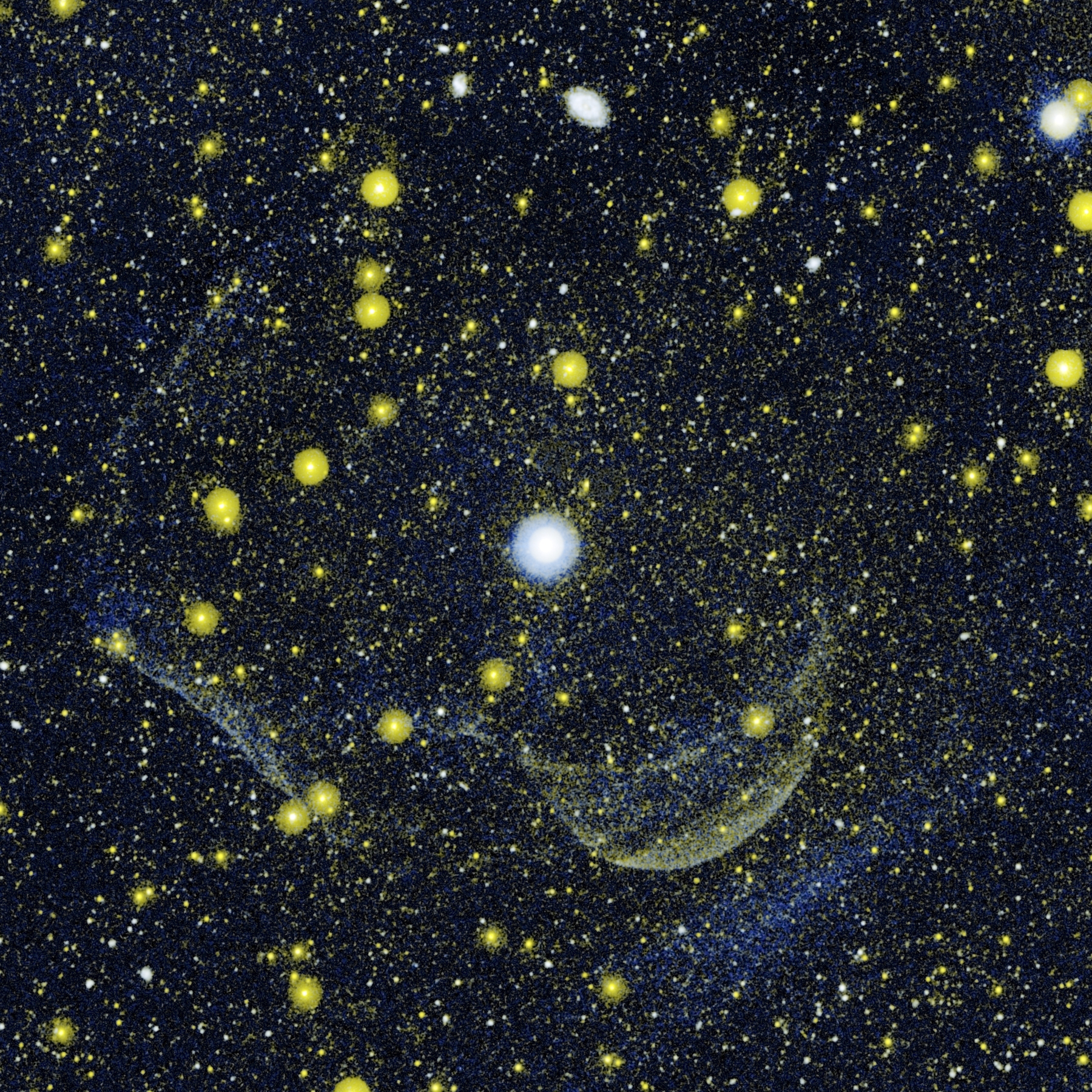
Z Camelopardalis in ultraviolet
