= SS Cygni =

Variable star in the constellation Cygnus

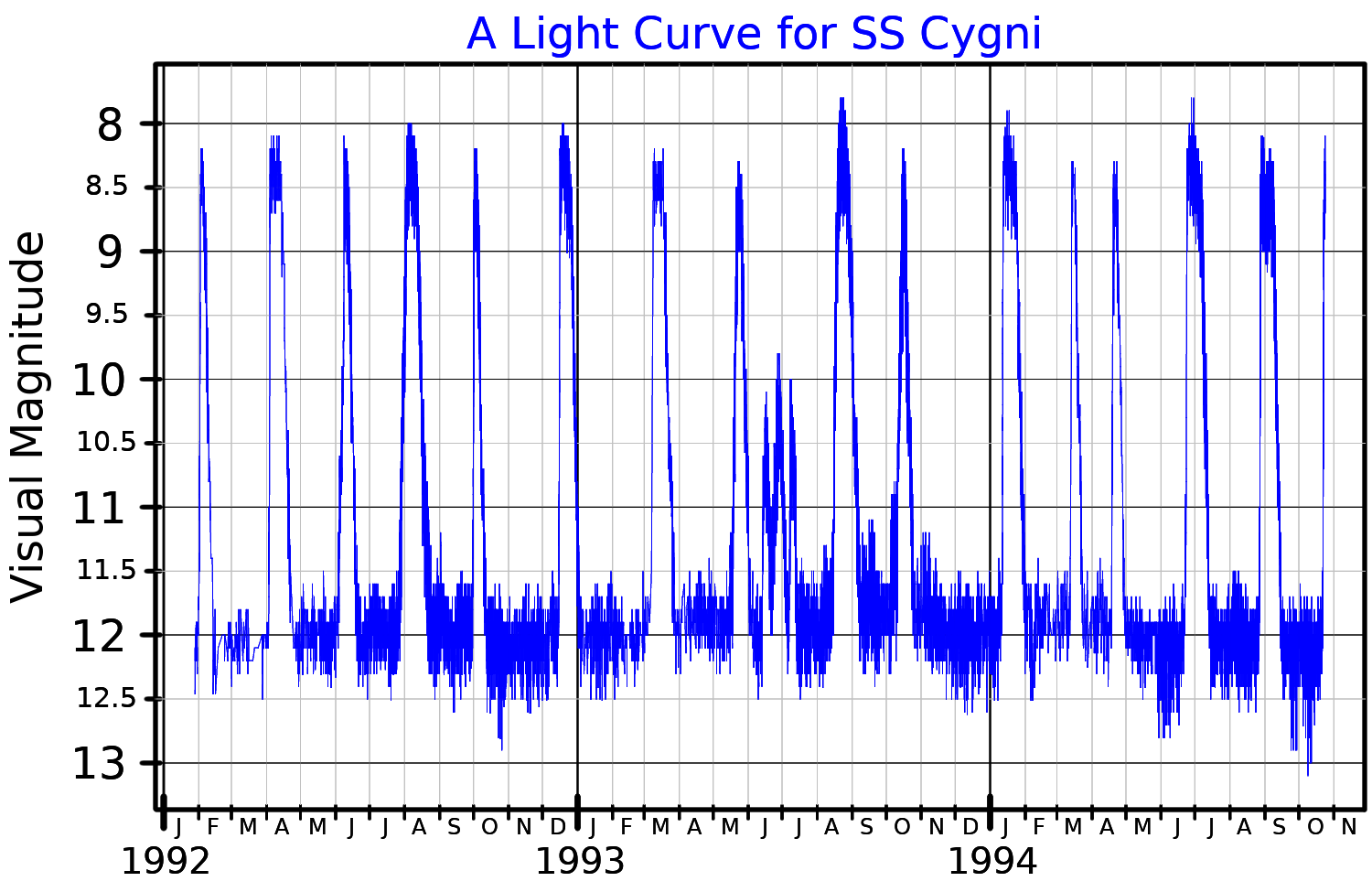
- A visual band light curve for SS Cygni, plotted from AAVSO data

Observation data Epoch J2000 Equinox ICRS
- Constellation: Cygnus
- Right ascension: 21^{h} 42^{m} 42.8034^{s}
- Declination: +43° 35′ 09.864″
- Apparent magnitude (V): 7.7–12.4

Characteristics
- Spectral type: K5V
- Variable type: Dwarf nova

Astrometry
Radial velocity (R_{v})	−6.3±2.3 km/s
Proper motion (μ)	RA: 112.373±0.113 mas/yr Dec.: 33.589±0.094 mas/yr
Parallax (π)	8.7242±0.0491 mas
Distance	372±7 ly (114±2 pc)

Orbit
Period (P)	0.27512973 days
Semi-major axis (a)	1.51–1.77 R_{☉}
Inclination (i)	45–56°
Semi-amplitude (K_{1}) (primary)	71.4±1.6 km/s
Semi-amplitude (K_{2}) (secondary)	158.6±0.7 km/s

Details

Red dwarf
Mass	0.19–0.30 M_{☉}
Temperature	4,560 K

White dwarf
Mass	0.42–0.67 M_{☉}

Other designations
- SS Cyg, HD 206697, BD+42°4189a, TYC 3196-723-1

Database references
SIMBAD	data

SS Cygni in outburst versus its quiet state

SS Cygni is a variable star in the northern constellation Cygnus (the Swan). It was discovered in 1896 by Louisa D. Wells, a computer working under Edward Pickering at Harvard College Observatory. It is the prototype of the subclass of dwarf novae that show only normal eruptions. It typically rises from 12th magnitude to 8th magnitude for 1–2 days every 7 or 8 weeks. The northerly declination of SS Cygni (about 44° N) makes the star almost circumpolar from European and North American latitudes, allowing a large proportion of the world's amateur astronomers to monitor its behavior. Furthermore, since the star lies against the rich backdrop of the Milky Way band, the telescope field of view around SS Cygni contains an abundance of useful brightness comparison stars.

SS Cygni, like all other cataclysmic variables, consists of a close binary system. One of the components is a red dwarf-type star, cooler than the Sun, while the other is a white dwarf. The stars in the SS Cygni system are separated by a distance "only" 1.51 times larger than the Sun, completing their orbital revolution in slightly over six hours and 36 minutes. The inclination of the system is estimated to be 45-56 degrees, yielding masses in the range of 0.42–0.67 M_{☉} for the white dwarf primary star and 0.19–0.30 M_{☉} for the red dwarf secondary star.

Astronomically speaking, SS Cygni is also fairly close by. Originally thought to be at 90 to 100 light years, its distance was revised in 1952 to about 400 light years. In 2007 Hubble Space Telescope data indicated a distance of about 540 light years, though this value caused difficulties with the theory of dwarf novae; this was checked during 2010–2012 using radio astrometry with VLBI, which yielded a smaller distance of 114 ± 2 parsecs (371.8 ± 6.5 ly). This value is much more in accord with the old (≈400 light-year) value, and it removes completely the difficulties the larger HST distance made for the theory of dwarf novae.
