= WZ Sagittae =

Variable star in the constellation Sagitta

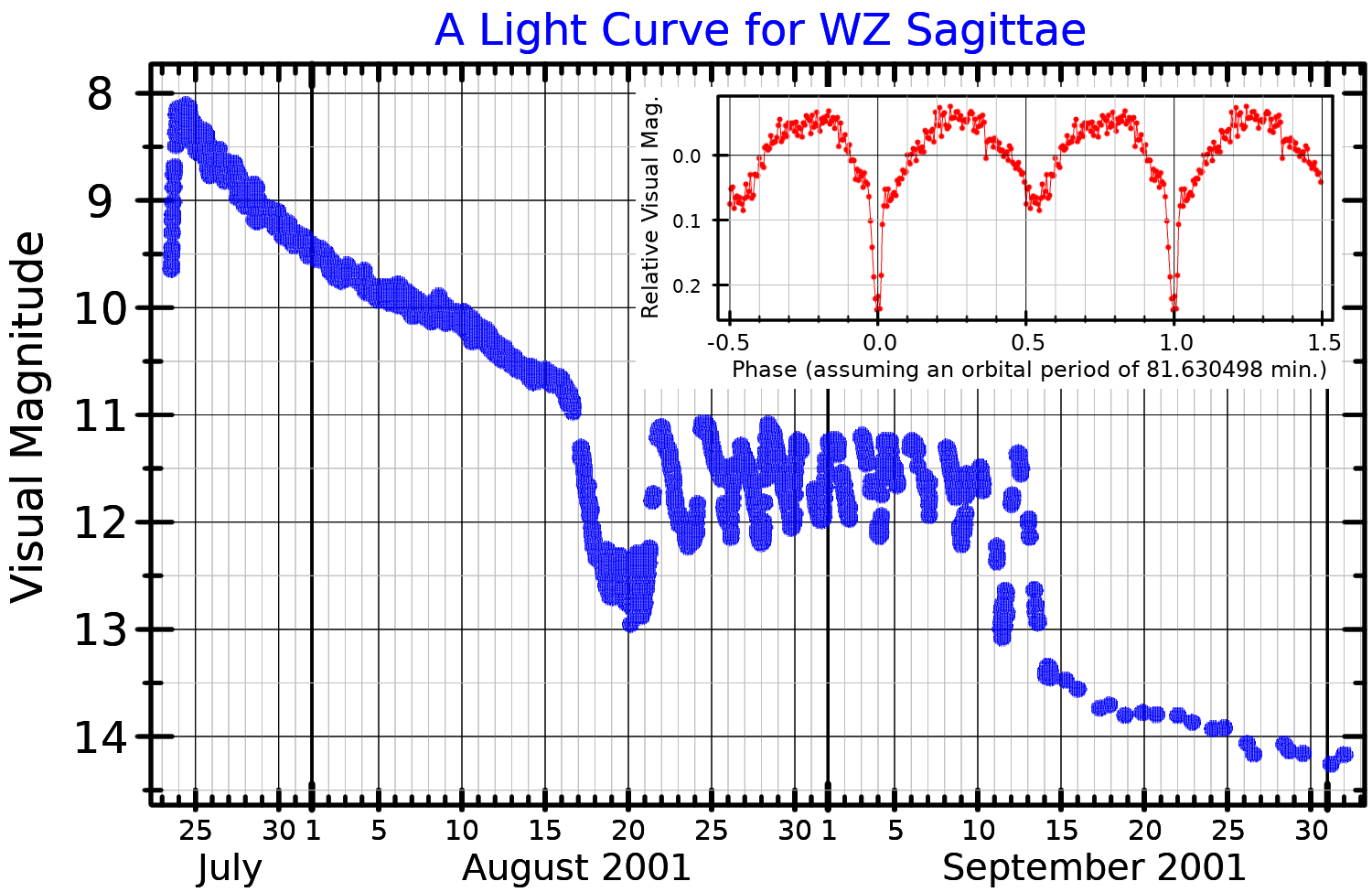
- A visual band light curve for WZ Sagittae. The main plot, adapted from Kato (2015), shows the period after the 2001 eruption, and the inset plot, adapted from Patterson et al. (2018), shows the short-term variability including the eclipse.

Observation data Epoch J2000 Equinox ICRS
- Constellation: Sagitta
- Right ascension: 20^{h} 07^{m} 36.5038^{s}
- Declination: +17° 42′ 14.733″
- Apparent magnitude (V): 7.0 - 15.5

Characteristics
- Spectral type: DApe
- U−B color index: +1.45
- B−V color index: +1.49
- Variable type: Dwarf nova

Astrometry
Radial velocity (R_{v})	−62.3 km/s
Proper motion (μ)	RA: 71.506(30) mas/yr Dec.: −24.329(24) mas/yr
Parallax (π)	22.1035±0.0304 mas
Distance	147.6 ± 0.2 ly (45.24 ± 0.06 pc)

Orbit
Period (P)	82 mins
Inclination (i)	77 ± 2°
Semi-amplitude (K_{1}) (primary)	40 ± 10 km/s

Details

A
Mass	0.85±0.04 M_{☉}
Surface gravity (log g)	9.0 cgs
Temperature	17,800 K

B
Mass	0.078 - 0.13 M_{☉}

Other designations
- WZ Sge, Sge 1913, 2MASS J20073649+1742147, WD 2003+17

Database references
SIMBAD	data

WZ Sagittae (WZ Sge) is a dwarf nova cataclysmic star system in the constellation Sagitta. It consists of a white dwarf primary being orbited by a low mass companion. The white dwarf is about 0.85 solar masses while the companion is only 0.08 solar masses. This implies that the companion is a spectral class L2 star, although this has yet to be confirmed. The distance to this system has been determined by parallax, yielding a distance of 45.2 parsecs.

In 1919, it was announced that Joanna Crighton Stevens Mackie had discovered an outburst of the star after examining Harvard College Observatory photographic plates. WZ Sagittae is an ultrashort period cataclysmic nova, with outbursts observed in 1913, 1946, 1978 and 2001. During the well-observed 2001 outburst, the nova reached a peak visual magnitude of 8.21. The 1913 event was the brightest of the observed outbursts, reaching a photographic magnitude of 7.0.

This nova is classified as a SU Ursae Majoris class star, which is a subclass of dwarf nova that produces what are termed superoutbursts spaced several months apart, interspaced with normal outbursts every few weeks. The normal outbursts typically last 2−3 days, while a superoutburst lasts a few weeks. However, WZ Sagittae is unusual in that it is only observed to emit superbursts.

The outbursts of a dwarf nova are caused when matter from a ring-like accretion disk becomes unstable. In this system, the companion star is sufficiently close to the white dwarf that the tidal bulge of the former overlaps the Roche limit, allowing matter to pass across and accumulate onto the disk. When the disk reaches a critical temperature, the gas collapses onto the white dwarf resulting in the release of gravitational potential energy.

A superoutburst may be caused by a tidal interaction of the accretion disk with the donor star, resulting in a greater deposition of matter on the white dwarf. In the case of WZ Sagittae, however, magnetic effects may act to enhance the deposition, resulting in the lack of normal outbursts. Because of the unique timing differences in the rate of superoutbursts of this nova, it been designated the prototype star for a WZ Sagittae subclass.

The orbital period of this system is 1.361 hours. Based upon observations of eclipses of the hot spot on the white dwarf (created by infalling material), the orbital plane of this system is inclined by 76° ± 6° to the line of sight from the Earth.

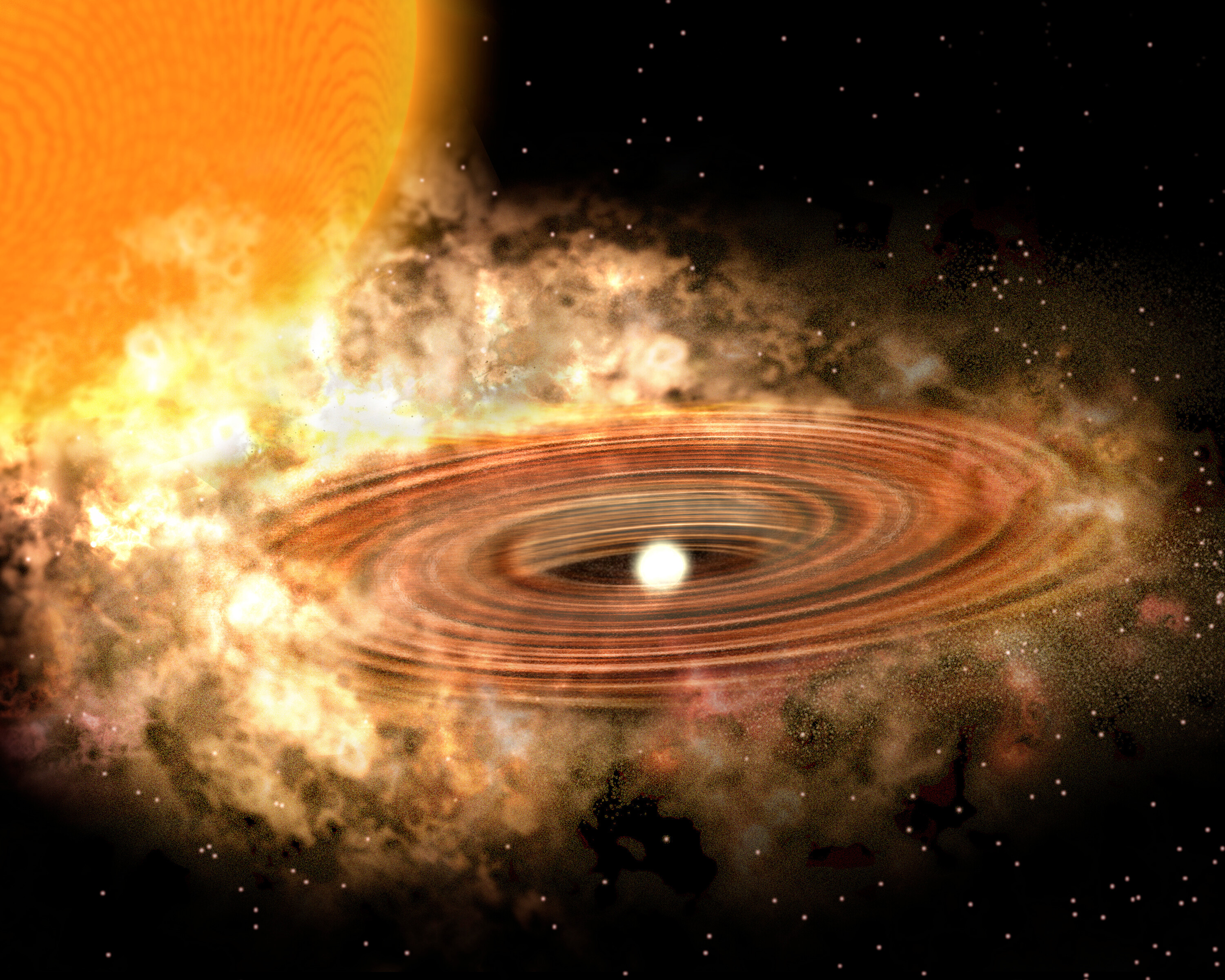
An artist's concept of an accretion disk as it might appear around the binary star system WZ Sagittae.
