= U Geminorum =

Star in the constellation Gemini

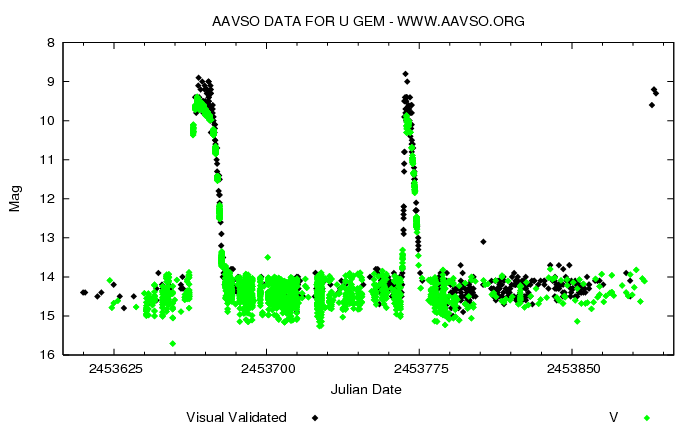
- AAVSO light curve of U Geminorum's outburst behavior. Different colors reflect different bandpasses. Day numbers are Julian day.

Observation data Epoch J2000.0 Equinox ICRS
- Constellation: Gemini
- Right ascension: 07^{h} 55^{m} 05.24^{s}
- Declination: +22° 00′ 05.1″
- Apparent magnitude (V): 8.2 - 14.9

Characteristics
- Spectral type: DA + M4.5Ve
- Variable type: U Gem + eclipsing

Astrometry
| Radial velocity (R_{v}) | +42.0 km/s |
| Proper motion (μ) | RA: −27.363±0.049 mas/yr Dec.: −40.398±0.027 mas/yr |
| Parallax (π) | 10.7121±0.0299 mas |
| Distance | 304.5 ± 0.8 ly (93.4 ± 0.3 pc) |

Orbit
| Primary | White dwarf |
| Name | Red dwarf |
| Period (P) | 0.1769062 days |
| Semi-major axis (a) | 1.55±0.02 R_{☉} |
| Eccentricity (e) | 0.027 |
| Inclination (i) | 69.7±0.7° |
| Semi-amplitude (K_{1}) (primary) | 107±2 km/s |
| Semi-amplitude (K_{2}) (secondary) | 310±5 km/s |

Details

White dwarf
| Mass | 1.2±0.05 M_{☉} |
| Radius | 0.008 R_{☉} |
| Surface gravity (log g) | 7.90 cgs |
| Temperature | 29,200 K |

Red dwarf
| Mass | 0.42±0.04 M_{☉} |
| Radius | 0.43±0.06 R_{☉} |

Other designations
- U Gem, BD+22 1807, HD 64511.

Database references
| SIMBAD | data |

U Geminorum (U Gem), in the constellation Gemini, is an archetypal example of a dwarf nova. The binary star system consists of a white dwarf closely orbiting a red dwarf. Every few months it undergoes an outburst that greatly increases its brightness. The dwarf nova class of variable stars are often referred to as U Geminorum variables after this star.

== Discovery ==
U Geminorum was discovered by J.R. Hind in 1855 who initially thought it was a nova; it quickly faded below his telescope's limiting magnitude. Its true nature was revealed three months later when it was re-observed in outburst by Pogson. The star has been monitored by amateur and professional astronomers ever since, though its location near the zodiac means that some outbursts are undoubtedly missed due to the seasonal gap.

== Orbit ==
The U Geminorum binary has a very short orbital period of 4 hours and 11 minutes; this orbit alone makes the system variable, as the components transit and eclipse each other with each revolution. Normally, the combined apparent magnitude varies between 14.0 and 15.1; during an outburst however, the star can brighten a hundredfold, to above 9th magnitude. Though the average interval between outbursts is 105.2 days, the period is in fact highly irregular, varying from as little as 62 days to as long as 257. As is the case with dwarf novae, the outbursts are theorized results of a periodic surge of influx from the white dwarf's accretion disk, caused by instability in the disk itself.

The orbital motion of the two stars causes their spectral lines to shift due to the doppler effect. However, the wavelengths of the white dwarf spectral lines are also changed due to its gravitational redshift. This complicates the derivation of an accurate orbit. The properties of the stars implied by their orbit are somewhat different from those directly observed or typical for stars of their type.

== Distance ==
Distance estimates for U Geminorum have varied from 52 parsecs (170 light-years) to 112 parsecs (370 light-years). The GAIA DR2 star catalog gives a distance of 93.4 parsecs (305 ly), with a likely margin of error around 0.3 parsecs (0.98 ly).

== See also ==
- Cataclysmic variable star
