= Superhump =

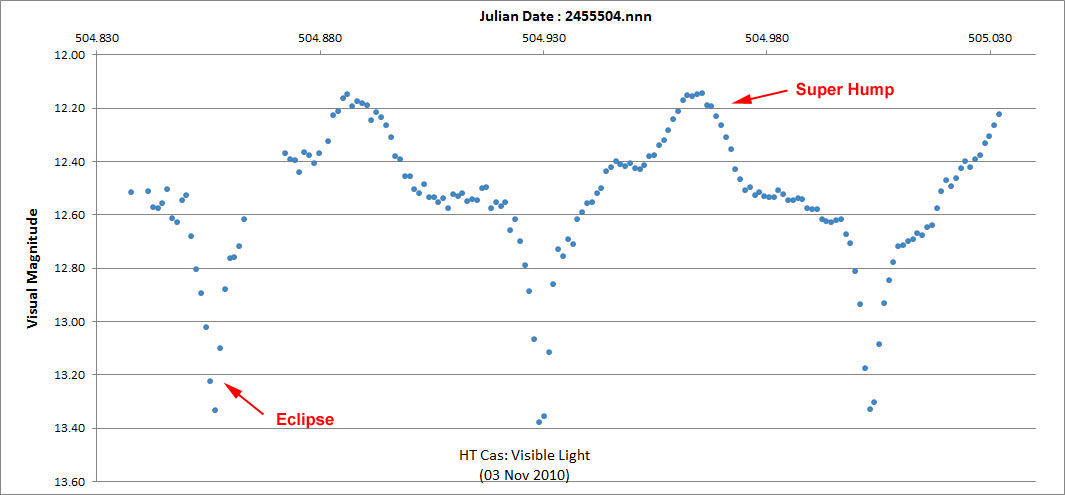
Light curve of eclipsing dwarf nova HT Cassiopeiae during outburst, showing eclipses and SU Ursae Majoris-type superhumps

In astronomy, a superhump is a periodic brightness variation in a cataclysmic variable star system, with a period within a few percent of the orbital period of the system.

== History ==
Superhumps were first seen in SU Ursae Majoris (SU UMa) stars, a subclass of dwarf novae, at times when the binary system underwent a superoutburst, which is an unusually strong outburst (increase in brightness) caused by an increased accretion rate.

== Period excess ==
The period of the superhump variations can be either greater or less than the orbital period, known as positive or negative superhumps respectively. The period excess is the difference between the superhump period and the orbital period, expressed as a fraction of the orbital period.

== Physical origin ==
The accretion disk is elongated by the tidal force of the donor star. The elliptical disk precesses around the white dwarf accretor over a time interval much longer than the orbital period, the beat period, causing a slight change in the orientation of the disk over each orbit. Superhumps in cataclysmic variable stars are the result of viscous dissipation by periodic deformations of the disk. These deformations are caused by the presence of a 3:1 resonance between the orbital periods of the accretion disk and the donor star. Retrograde precession of the disk causes negative superhumps, with periods slightly less than the orbital period.

Superhumps can occur in dwarf nova systems in which the donor star (mass-losing star) has a mass that is at most 34 percent the mass of the accretor star (mass-gaining star). The amplitude can be up to 0.6 magnitudes.
