= Dwarf nova =

Cataclysmic variable star, consisting of a close binary star system

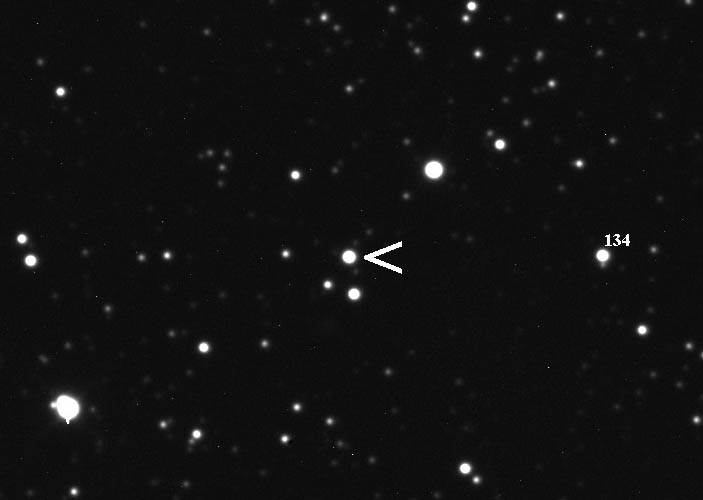
Dwarf nova HT Cas seen in outburst (mag ~13.4) on November 2, 2010

A dwarf nova (pl. novae), or U Geminorum variable, is one of several types of cataclysmic variable star, consisting of a close binary star system in which one of the components is a white dwarf that accretes matter from its companion. Dwarf novae are dimmer and repeat more often than "classical" novae.

== Overview ==
The first one to be observed was U Geminorum in 1855; however, the mechanism was not known until 1974, when Brian Warner showed that the nova is due to the increase of the luminosity of the accretion disk. They are similar to classical novae in that the white dwarf is involved in periodic outbursts, but the mechanisms are different. Classical novae result from the fusion and detonation of accreted hydrogen on the primary's surface. Current theory suggests that dwarf novae result from instability in the accretion disk, when gas in the disk reaches a critical temperature that causes a change in viscosity, resulting in a temporary increase in mass flow through the disc, which heats the whole disc and hence increases its luminosity. The mass transfer from the donor star is less than this increased flow through the disc, so the disc will eventually drop back below the critical temperature and revert to a cooler, duller mode.

Dwarf novae are distinct from classical novae in other ways; their luminosity is lower, and they are typically recurrent on a scale from days to decades. The luminosity of the outburst increases with the recurrence interval as well as the orbital period; recent research with the Hubble Space Telescope suggests that the latter relationship could make dwarf novae useful standard candles for measuring cosmic distances.

There are three subtypes of U Geminorum star (UG):

- SS Cygni stars (UGSS), which increase in brightness by 2–6 mag in V in 1–2 days, and return to their original brightnesses in several subsequent days.
- SU Ursae Majoris stars (UGSU), which have brighter and longer "supermaxima" outbursts, or superoutbursts, in addition to normal outbursts. Varieties of SU Ursae Majoris star include ER Ursae Majoris stars and WZ Sagittae stars (UGWZ).
- Z Camelopardalis stars (UGZ), which temporarily "halt" at a particular brightness below their peak; a behavior termed a "standstill". They are interpreted as occupying the border between the classes of dwarf nova and the more stable nova-like variables.

In addition to the large outbursts, some dwarf novae show periodic brightening known as “superhumps”. They are caused by deformations of the accretion disk when its rotation is in resonance with the orbital period of the binary.

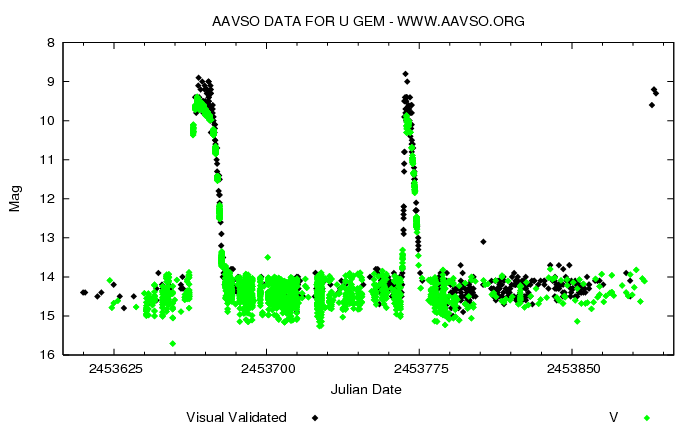
AAVSO light curve of U Geminorum (SS Cygni type)

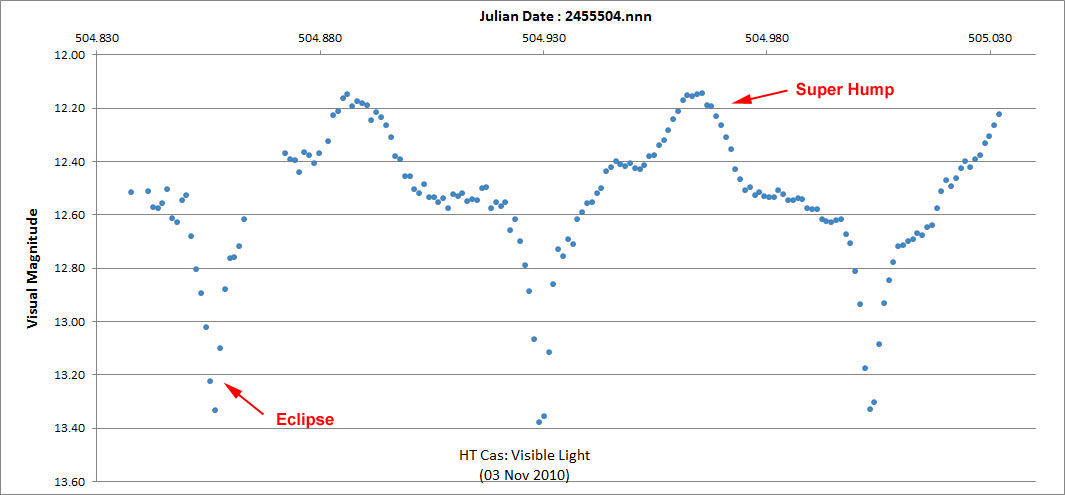
Light curve of eclipsing dwarf nova HT Cassiopeiae during outburst, showing eclipses and superhumps (SU Ursae Majoris type)

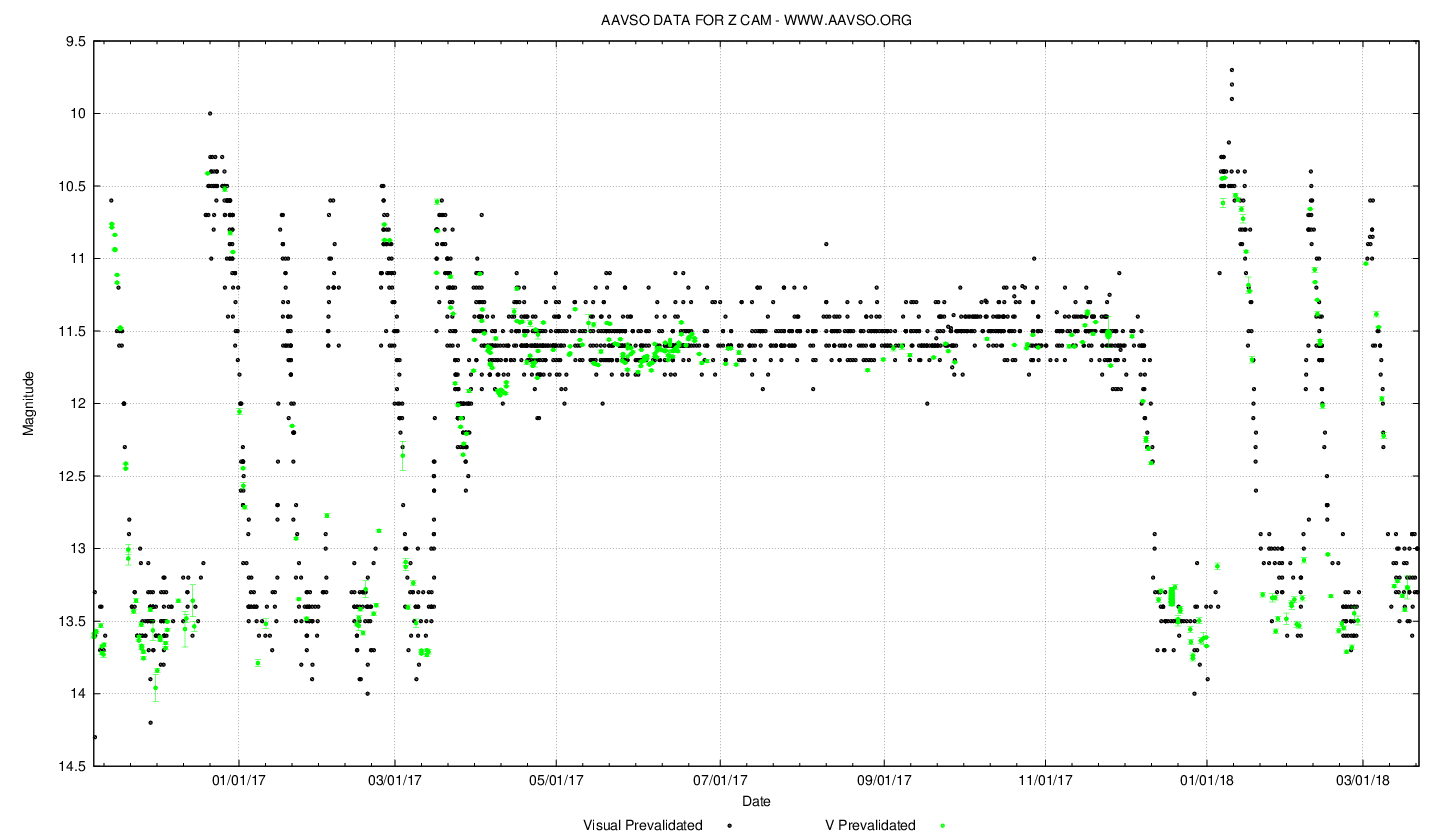
Light curve of Z Camelopardalis (Z Camelopardalis type)
