= Cataclysmic variable star =

Stars with irregular large fluctuations in brightness

A non-magnetic cataclysmic variable. A white dwarf accretes matter from its Roche lobe-filling companion.

In astronomy, cataclysmic variable stars (CVs) are stars which irregularly increase in brightness by a large factor, then drop back down to a quiescent state. They were initially called novae (from Latin 'new'), since those with an outburst brightness visible to the naked eye and an invisible quiescent brightness appeared as new stars in the sky.

Cataclysmic variable stars are binary stars that consist of two components; a white-dwarf primary, and a mass-transferring secondary. The stars are so close to each other that the gravity of the white dwarf distorts the secondary, and the white dwarf accretes matter from the companion. Therefore, the secondary is often referred to as the donor star, and it is usually less massive than the primary. The infalling matter, which is usually rich in hydrogen, forms in most cases an accretion disk around the white dwarf. Strong UV and X-ray emission is often detected from the accretion disc, powered by the loss of gravitational potential energy from the infalling material. The shortest observed orbit in a hydrogen-rich system is 51 minutes in ZTF J1813+4251.

Material at the inner edge of the disc falls onto the surface of the white-dwarf primary. A classical nova outburst occurs when the density and temperature at the bottom of the accumulated hydrogen layer rise high enough to ignite runaway hydrogen fusion reactions, which rapidly convert the hydrogen layer to helium. If the accretion process continues long enough to bring the white dwarf close to the Chandrasekhar limit, then the increasing interior density may ignite runaway carbon fusion and trigger a Type Ia supernova explosion, which would completely destroy the white dwarf.

The accretion disc may be prone to an instability leading to dwarf-nova outbursts, when the outer portion of the disc changes from a cool, dull mode to a hotter, brighter mode for a time, before reverting to the cool mode. Dwarf novae can recur on timescales of days to decades.

== Classification ==
Cataclysmic variables are subdivided into several smaller groups, often named after a bright prototype star characteristic of the class. In some cases, the magnetic field of the white dwarf is strong enough to disrupt the inner accretion disk or even prevent disk formation altogether. Magnetic systems often show strong and variable polarization in their optical light, and are therefore sometimes called polars; these often exhibit small-amplitude brightness fluctuations at what is presumed to be the white dwarf's period of rotation.

Supernovae	These are classed as cataclysmic variables and have extremely large outbursts that destroy the progenitor star. Some result from white dwarfs in binary systems, but others are very massive stars.
(Classical) novae	These cataclysmic variables have very large outbursts, of 6 to 19 magnitudes, caused by thermonuclear fusion of material accreted onto the white dwarf.
Recurrent novae	These have outbursts of about 4 to 9 magnitudes, repeating every 10 to 80 years. Examples include T Pyxidis and RS Ophiuchi.
Dwarf novae	Dwarf novae, or U Geminorum stars, are cataclysmic variables which are observed to brighten repeatedly, though by a smaller amount than classical novae.: Z Camelopardalis stars / Temporarily "halt" at a particular brightness below their peak; SU Ursae Majoris stars / Have "superoutbursts" which are brighter than the average; SS Cygni stars / Have outbursts of two distinct lengths
Luminous red novae	These are stellar mergers that become very red after outburst.
Polars	AM Herculis stars are binaries in which the magnetic field of the white dwarf has synchronized the latter's rotational period with the binary orbital period. Matter from the donor star is magnetically channeled onto the white dwarf rather than forming a disc. DQ Herculis, also called "intermediate polars", have a slightly weaker magnetic field than AM Herculis stars; there is an accretion disc, but substructure in it is created by the field.
VY Sculptoris	These are stars which occasionally drop in brightness by more than one magnitude, with very occasional dwarf-nova-type outbursts during the dim state. They may be a subclass of polars.
AM Canum Venaticorum	These are cataclysmic variables whose components are both white dwarfs; the accretion disc is composed primarily of helium, and they are of interest as sources of gravitational waves.
SW Sextantis	These are like dwarf novae but have the accretion disc in a steady state, so do not show outbursts; the disc emits non-uniformly. They are usually also eclipsing variables, though this appears to be a selection artefact.
Z Andromedae (symbiotic variables)	These are close binaries with a large cool component losing mass to a hotter compact component and accretion disc.

There are over 1600 known CV systems. The catalog was frozen as of 1 February 2006 though more are discovered each year.

== Discovery ==
Cataclysmic variables are among the classes of astronomical objects most commonly found by amateurs, since a cataclysmic variable in its outburst phase is bright enough to be detectable with very modest instruments, and the only celestial objects easily confused with them are bright asteroids whose movement from night to night is clear.

Verifying that an object is a cataclysmic variable is also fairly straightforward: they are usually quite blue objects, they exhibit rapid and strong variability, and they tend to have peculiar emission lines. They emit in the ultraviolet and X-ray ranges; they are expected also to emit gamma rays, from annihilation of positrons from proton-rich nuclei produced in the fusion explosion, but this has not yet been detected.

Around six galactic novae (i.e. in the Milky Way) are discovered each year, whilst models based on observations in other galaxies suggest that the rate of occurrence ought to be between 20 and 50 per year; this discrepancy is due partly to obscuration by interstellar dust, and partly to a lack of observers in the southern hemisphere and to the difficulties of observing while the Sun is up and at full moon.

== Superhumps ==
Some cataclysmic variables experience periodic brightenings caused by deformations of the accretion disk when its rotation is in resonance with the orbital period of the binary.
