= Brian Warner (astronomer) =

British South African astronomer (1939–2023)

Brian Warner Hon. FRSSAf
- Born: 25 May 1939; Crawley Down, Sussex, England
- Died: 5 May 2023 (aged 83); South Africa
- Education: University College London ( BSc, PhD); University of London (DSc); University of Oxford (DSc)
- Awards: John F.W. Herschel Medal (1988); Gill Medal (1992); Science-for-Society Gold Medal (2004)
- Scientific career
- Fields: Astronomy; History of astronomy
- Workplaces: University College London; Balliol College, Oxford; University of Texas at Austin; University of Cape Town
- Thesis: Abundances in Late-Type Stars (1964)
- Doctoral advisor: Roy Henry Garstang
- Doctoral students: Ed Nather; Tim Hawarden

Brian Warner (25 May 1939 – 5 May 2023) Hon. FRSSAf was a British South African optical astronomer who was Emeritus Distinguished Professor of natural philosophy at the University of Cape Town. Warner's research included cataclysmic variable stars, pulsars, degenerate stars and binary stars. He also researched and published on the history of astronomy in South Africa.

== Biography ==
=== Early life and education ===
Warner was born 25 May 1939 in Crawley Down, Sussex, England. His father was a gardener on a country estate and his mother was a charwoman. He didn't pass his eleven-plus exam, failing in mathematics, but was nonetheless admitted to the East Grinstead County Grammar School on the recommendation of his teacher. As a schoolboy he befriended the noted amateur astronomer Patrick Moore who lived nearby in East Grinstead where Warner and his friends would use Moore's telescope.

Warner went to University College London (UCL) in 1958 to study undergraduate astronomy. As a student, he was able to use the University of London Observatory. His first two papers were published in 1960, shortly before he graduated. The first in the Journal of the British Astronomical Association on rilles near the lunar crater Pluto, the second in Monthly Notices of the Royal Astronomical Society on the emission spectra of Venus. Warner remained at UCL for postgraduate studies, completing a PhD in astronomical spectroscopy in 1964 titled Abundances in Late type Stars. His doctoral supervisor was Roy Henry Garstang. For his thesis research he travelled to the Radcliffe Observatory in Pretoria, South Africa, to use the observatory's 1.9 m (6.2 ft) telescope.

=== Career ===
Warner became a postdoctoral researcher at UCL, before being awarded a Radcliffe-Henry Skynner Fellowship at Balliol College, Oxford, though the university didn't have its own observatory. In 1967 he was recruited to the University of Texas at Austin for his experience in spectroscopy. He also worked with his colleagues Ed Nather and David Evans in developing the new field of high-speed photometry for studying variable stars and measuring stellar radii by observing lunar occultations. In 1972 he was recruited as the first professor of astronomy at the University of Cape Town (UCT) and as head of the astronomy department. Nather also moved to UCT to undertake a PhD, with Warner as his doctoral supervisor. From 1981 to 1983, he served as president of the Royal Society of South Africa. Warner was head of the astronomy department until 1999, before formally retiring in 2004 though he continued to undertake research.

Warner died 5 May 2023 aged 83.

== Awards and honours ==
- McIntyre Award (1983) of the Astronomical Society of Southern Africa
- The John F.W. Herschel Medal (1988) of the Royal Society of South Africa
- South Africa Medal (1989) of the Southern African Association for the Advancement of Science
- Gill Medal (1992) of the Astronomical Society of Southern Africa
- Honorary fellow of the Royal Astronomical Society (1994)
- Honorary member of the Royal Astronomical Society of New Zealand (1995)
- Science-for-Society Gold Medal (2004) of the Academy of Science of South Africa
- Honorary fellow of the Royal Society of South Africa (2008)
- Honorary doctorate from the University of Cape Town (2009)
- Honorary fellow of University College London (2009)
- Fellow of The World Academy of Sciences (2009)

== Books ==
=== Authored ===
- Warner, Brian (1979). Astronomers at the Royal Observatory, Cape of Good Hope. Cape Town: A. A. Balkema. ISBN 978-0-86961-109-8.
- Warner, Brian (1983). Charles Piazzi Smyth, Astronomer Artist: His Cape Years 1835–1845. Cape Town: A. A. Balkema. ISBN 0-86961-133-X.
- Warner, Brian; Warner, Nancy (1984). Maclear and Herschel: Letters and Diaries at the Cape of Good Hope, 1834–1938. Cape Town: A. A. Balkema. ISBN 0-86961-145-3.
- Warner, Brian (1988). High Speed Astronomical Photometry. Cambridge University Press. ISBN 978-0-521-35150-8.
- Warner, Brian (1995). Royal Observatory, Cape of Good Hope, 1820–1831: The Founding of a Colonial Observatory. Dordrecht: Kluwer Academic Publishers. ISBN 0-7923-3527-9.
- Warner, Brian (1996). Cataclysmic Variable Stars. Cambridge University Press. ISBN 0-511-58649-3.
- Warner, Brian (1996). Dinosaurs' End: Scientific Poems. Cape Town: Firfield Pamphlet Press. ISBN 1-875058-06-0.
- Warner, Brian; Rourke, John (1998). Flora Herscheliana: Sir John and Lady Herschel at the Cape 1834 to 1838. Houghton: Brenthurst Press. ISBN 0-909079-55-2.
- Warner, Brian (2006). Cape Landscapes: Sir John Herschel's Sketches 1834–1838. University of Cape Town Press. ISBN 1-919713-75-1.
- Warner, Brian (2007). Scatological Verse. Illustrated by Tony Grogan. Plumstead: Snailpress. ISBN 978-0-620-38273-1.

=== Edited ===
- Franklin, Jane (1985). Warner, Brian; Warner, Nancy (eds.). The Journal of Lady Jane Franklin at the Cape of Good Hope, November 1836. Cape Town: Friends of the South African Library. ISBN 0-620-08355-7.
- Mann, William (1989). Warner, Brian (ed.). The Cape Diary and Letters of William Mann, Astronomer and Mountaineer: 1839–1843. Cape Town: Friends of the South African Library. ISBN 0-86968-093-5.
- Herschel, Margaret Brodie Stewart (1991). Warner, Brian (ed.). Lady Herschel: Letters from the Cape, 1834-1838. Cape Town: Friends of the South African Library. ISBN 0-86968-098-6.
- Warner, Brian, ed. (1992). Variable Stars and Galaxies. San Francisco: Astronomical Society of the Pacific. ISBN 0-937707-49-X.
- Warner, Brian, ed. (1992). John Herschel 1792–1992: Bicentennial Symposium. Royal Society of South Africa. ISBN 0-9583958-1-0.
- Westra, Pieter E.; Warner, Brian, eds. (1993). Festschrift in honour of Frank R. Bradlow. Cape Town: Friends of the South African Library. ISBN 0-86968-109-5.
- Buckley, D. A. H.; Warner, Brian, eds. (1995). Cape Workshop on Magnetic Cataclysmic Variables. San Francisco: Astronomical Society of the Pacific. ISBN 1-886733-06-6.
- Warner, Brian (1995). Astronomy in South Africa. Dordrecht: Kluwer Academic Publishers.
