= Real Programmers Don't Use Pascal =

1983 essay about programming

"Real Programmers Don't Use Pascal" (a parody of the bestselling 1982 tongue-in-cheek book on stereotypes about masculinity Real Men Don't Eat Quiche) is an essay about computer programming written by Ed Post of Tektronix, Inc., and published in July 1983 as a reader's contribution in Datamation.

== History ==
Widely circulated on Usenet in its day, and well known in the computer software industry, the article compares and contrasts real programmers, who use punch cards and write programs in FORTRAN or assembly language, with modern-day "quiche eaters" who use programming languages such as Pascal which support structured programming and impose restrictions meant to prevent or minimize common bugs due to inadvertent programming logic errors. Also mentioned are feats such as Seymour Cray, later the inventor of the Cray-1 supercomputer, using manual control switches to load the first operating system for the CDC 7600 without notes.

The next year Ed Nather’s The Story of Mel, also known as The realest programmer of all, extended the theme. Immortalized in the piece is Mel Kaye of the Royal McBee Computer Corporation. As the story famously puts it, "He wrote in machine code—in 'raw, unadorned, inscrutable hexadecimal numbers. Directly.'"

Since then, the computer folklore term Real Programmer has come to describe the archetypical "hardcore" programmer who eschews the modern languages and tools of the day in favour of more direct and efficient (for the machine, decidedly not for the programmer) solutions—closer to the hardware. The term is used in many subsequent articles, webcomics, and in-jokes—although the alleged defining features of a "Real Programmer" differ with time and place.

== See also ==
- Pascal (programming language) § Early criticism
