= Librascope =

American technology company

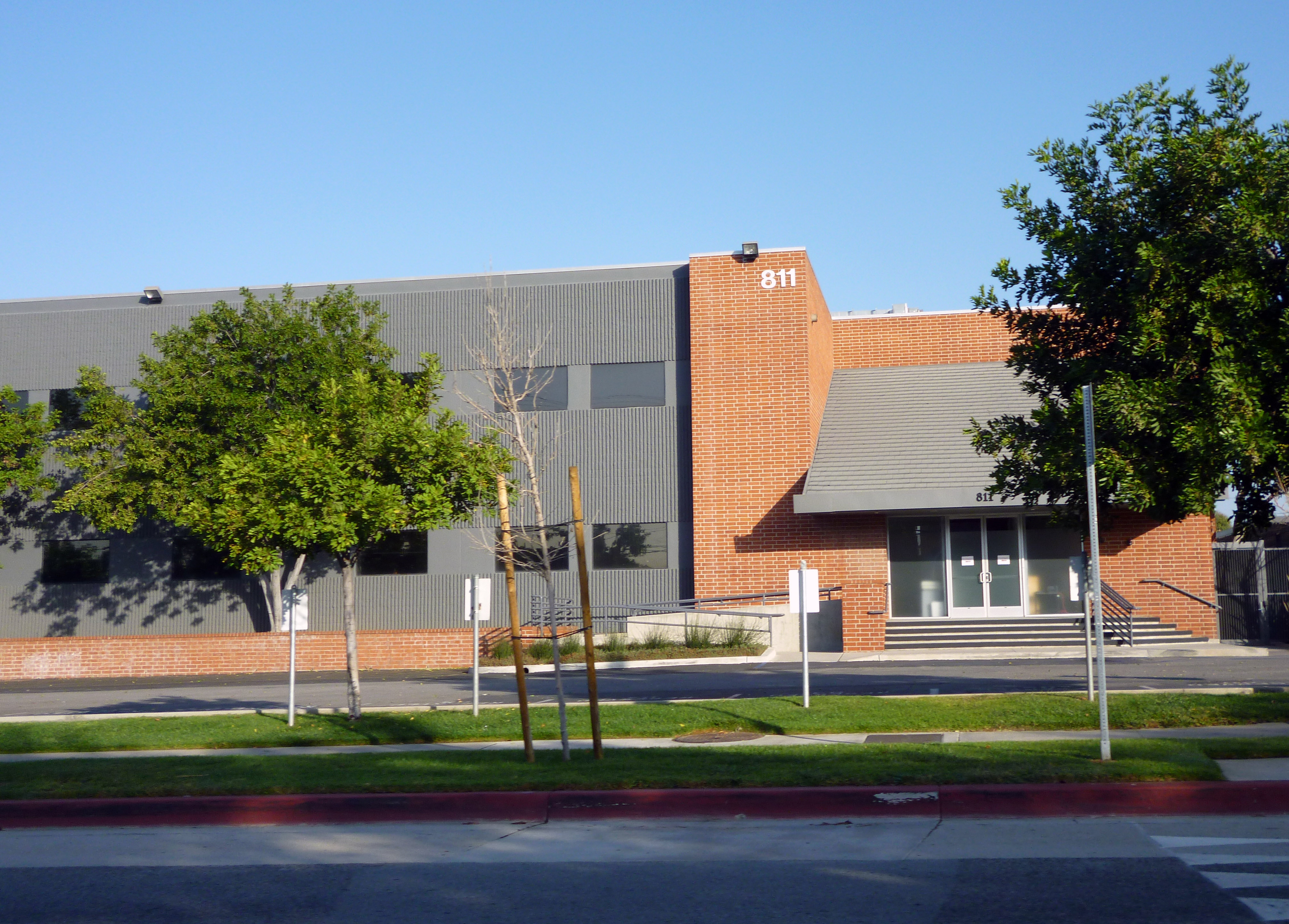
Librascope's former building in Glendale, which is currently home to offices for Disney Television Animation

Librascope was a Glendale, California, division of General Precision, Inc. (GPI). It was founded in 1937 by Lewis W. Imm to build and operate theater equipment, and acquired by General Precision in 1941. During World War II it worked on improving aircraft load balancing.

Later, Librascope became a manufacturer of early digital computers sold in both the business and defense markets. It hired Stan Frankel, a Manhattan Project veteran and early ENIAC programmer, to design the LGP-30 desk computer in 1956.

In 1964 Librascope's Avionic Equipment Division at San Marcos has been shifted to the Aerospace Group, GPI as the West Coast facility of the Kearfott Division.

Librascope was eventually purchased by Singer Corporation and moved into the manufacture of marine systems and land-based C3 (Command, Control, Communication) systems for the international defense industry. The company specialized in fire control systems for torpedoes, though they continued to work on a variety of other smaller military contracts through the 1970s.

After Singer was taken over by corporate raider Paul Bilzerian, the company was sold to Loral Space & Communications in 1992. The division was eventually sold to Lockheed Martin and was eventually absorbed into the Lockheed Martin Federal Systems, but is now called Lockheed Martin NE&SS—Undersea Systems.

== Computers ==
- LGP-30
- LGP-21
- Librascope AN/ASN-24 general purpose Airborne/Aerospace Computer Set (1958), after modification used in:
  - Centaur guidance computer (Librascope-3)
  - Lockheed C-141A Starlifter and C-130E Hercules - Digital Navigation Computer (System 605A), AN/ASN-24(V)
  - Atlas-Centaur Navigation Computer (GPK-33)
  - Digital Camera-Control System - aerial-reconnaissance camera system, AN/ASN-24(XY-1)
- Librascope C141 airborne navigation computer
- Librascope L90-I general purpose aerospace computer (1962)
- Librascope L600 aircraft and missile guidance computer
- Librascope L-2010 general purpose rugged computer (1962), portable
- Librascope L3055 data processor for 473L system
