= Stuttgart Computer Museum =

Coordinates: 48.7452°N 9.1065°E

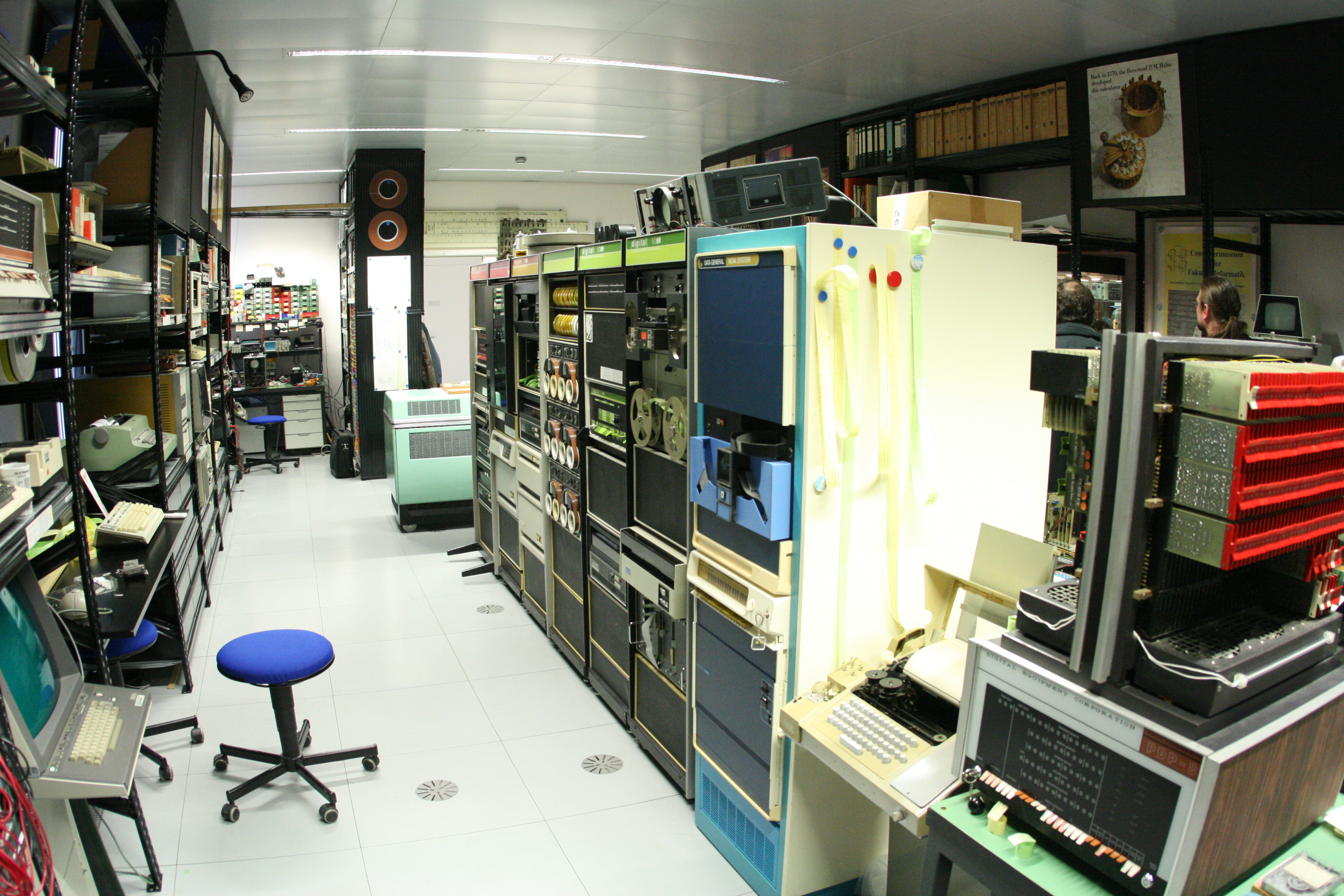
- The museum in 2015
- Established: 1997
- Location: Universitätsstraße 38, Stuttgart-Vaihingen, Germany
- Type: Computer museum
- Director: Klemens Krause
- Owner: University of Stuttgart
- Website: www.computermuseum-stuttgart.de

Stuttgart Computer Museum (Computermuseum der Stuttgarter Informatik) is a collection of calculators, mechanical calculating machines, and analog and digital computers at the Vaihingen campus of University of Stuttgart, Germany established in 1997.

Highlights of the collection include several DEC PDP-8 and DEC PDP-11 models, an IBM 1130, and a LGP-30 vacuum tube-based computer. Many items in the collection are in fully working condition and are available for demonstrations. Since 2020, the museum has hosted a virtual event series called "Evenings at the Computer Museum," showcasing various exhibits and demonstrating their functionality.

The inventory primarily consists of decommissioned systems and their components, as well as various documents such as manuals. For instance, the Karlsruhe University donated an extensive program collection on punched tape along with a PDP-11/10 equipped with a vector graphics unit. A Mincal-523 computing system originated from the Federal Institute of Hydrology in Koblenz. It was acquired in a non-functional state and restored to working order through reverse engineering. In 2021, a PDP-12 was added to the collection, donated by the University Observatory in Vienna.

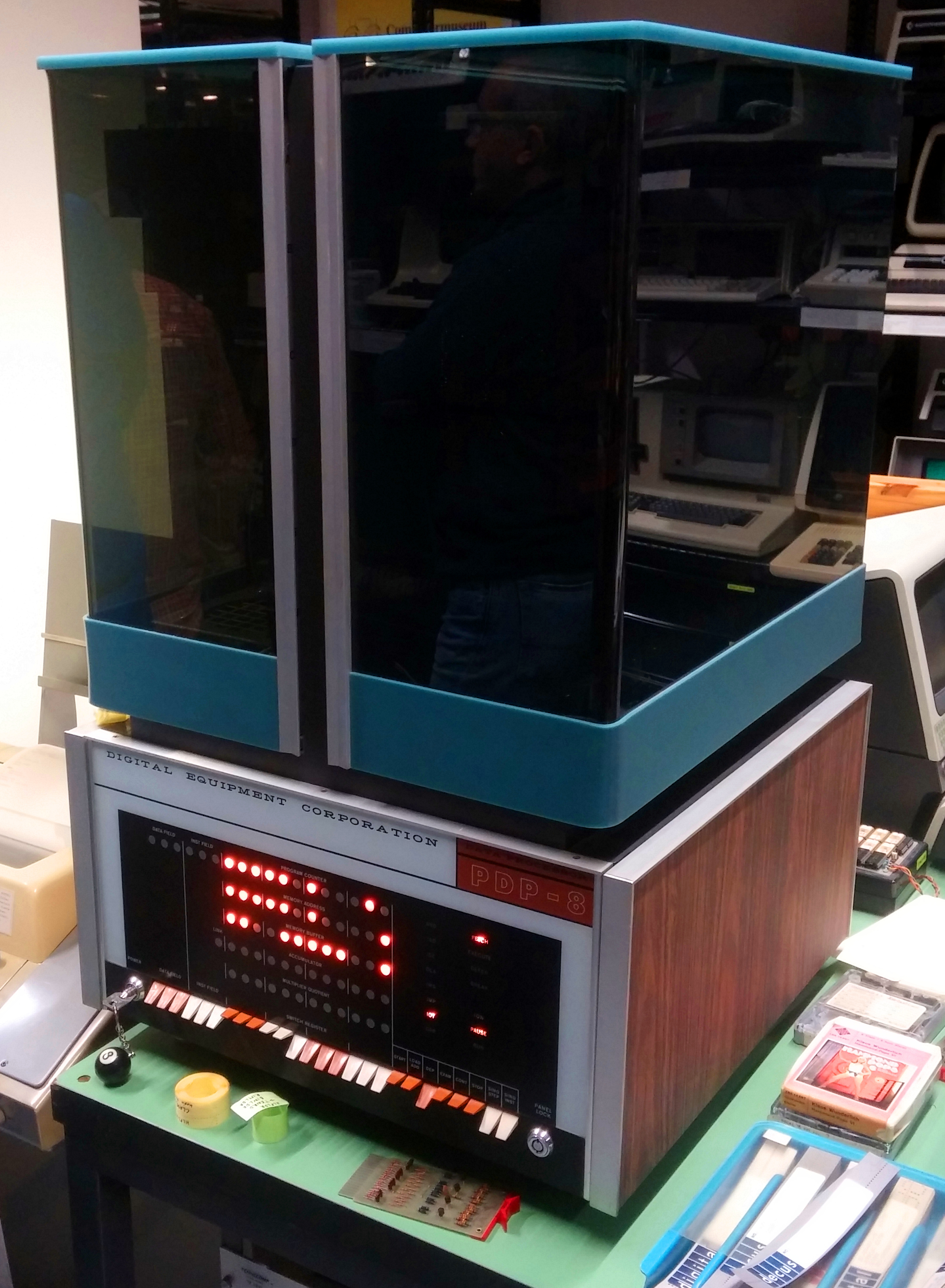
PDP-8 "Straight-8"

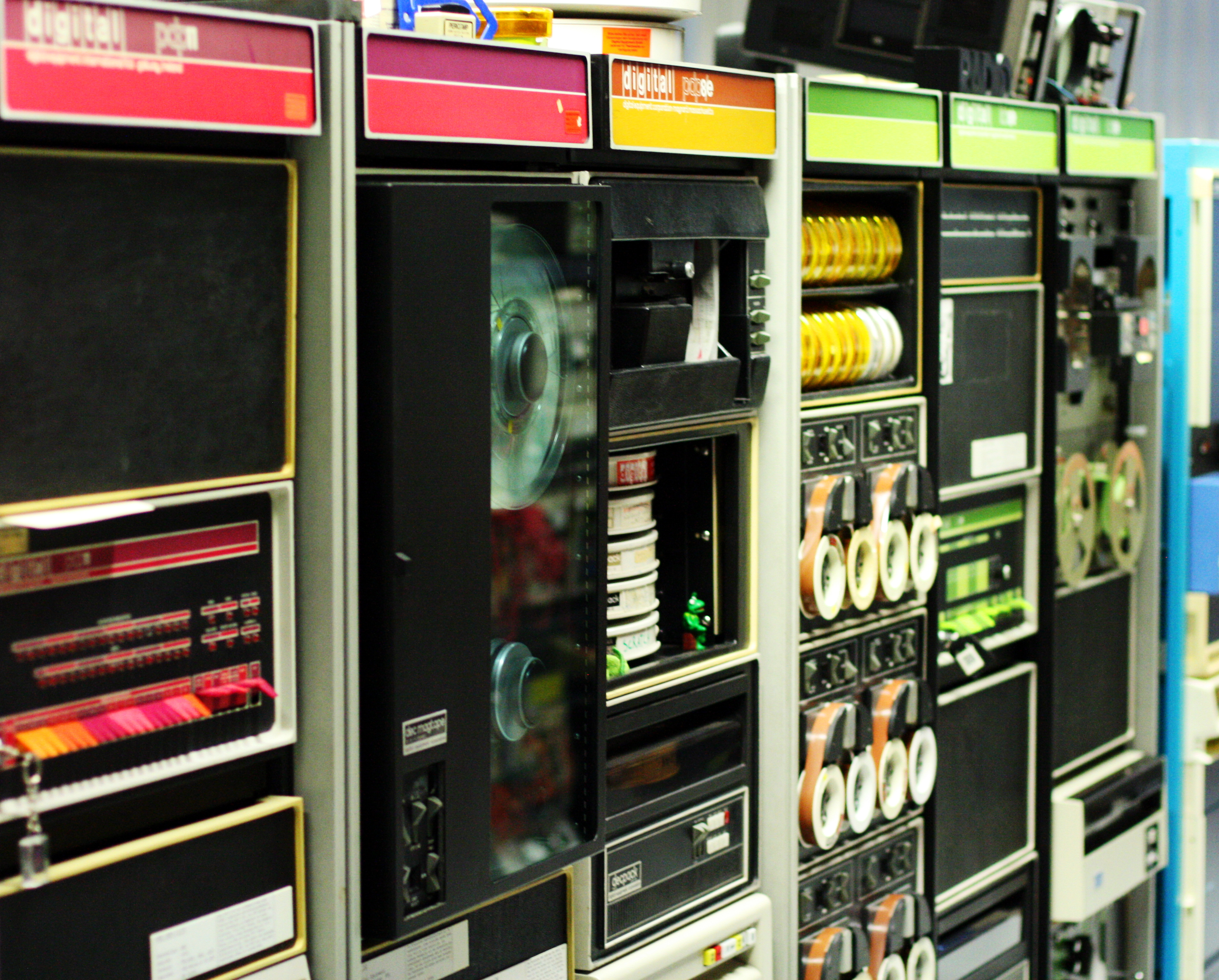
DEC PDP collection

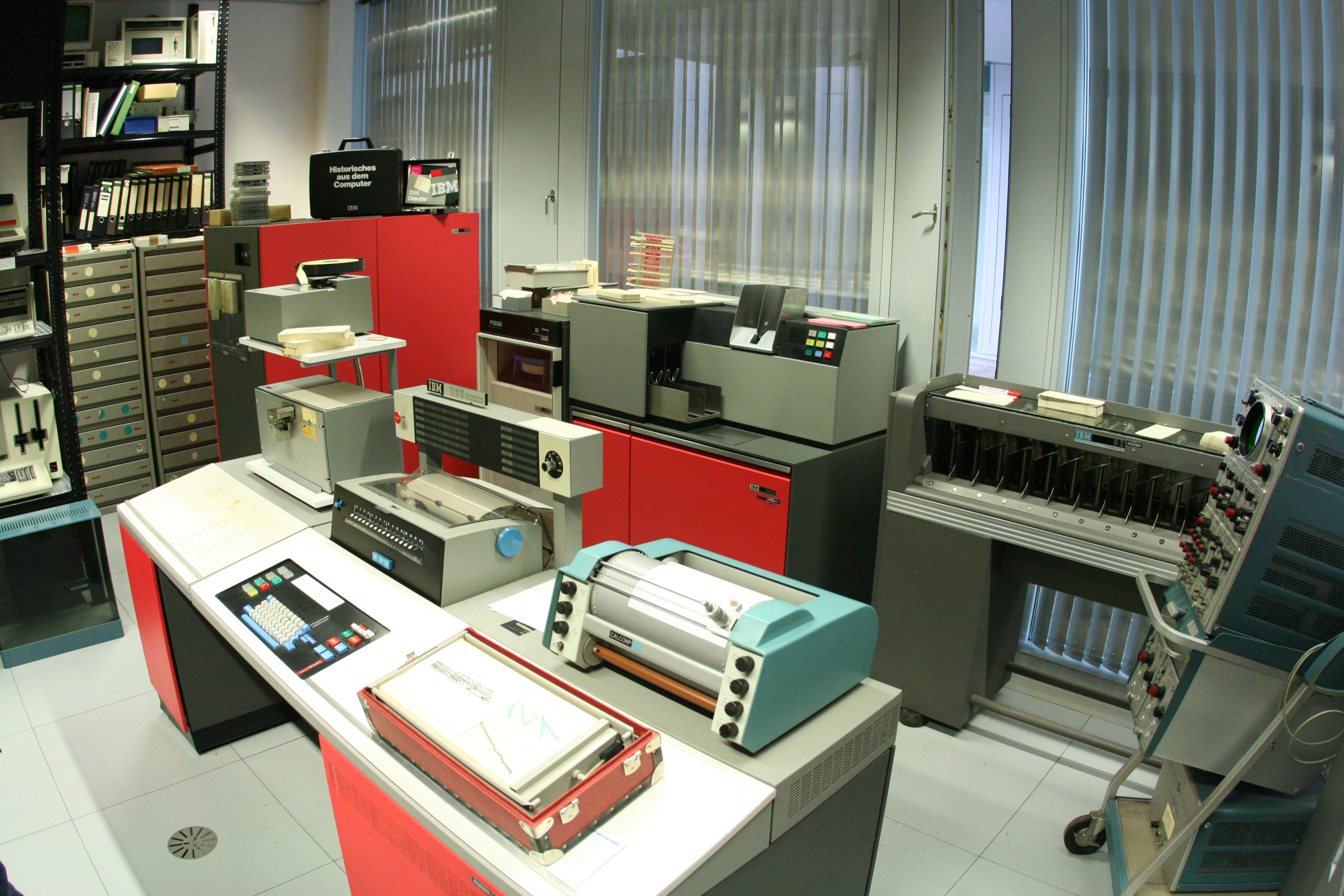
IBM 1130

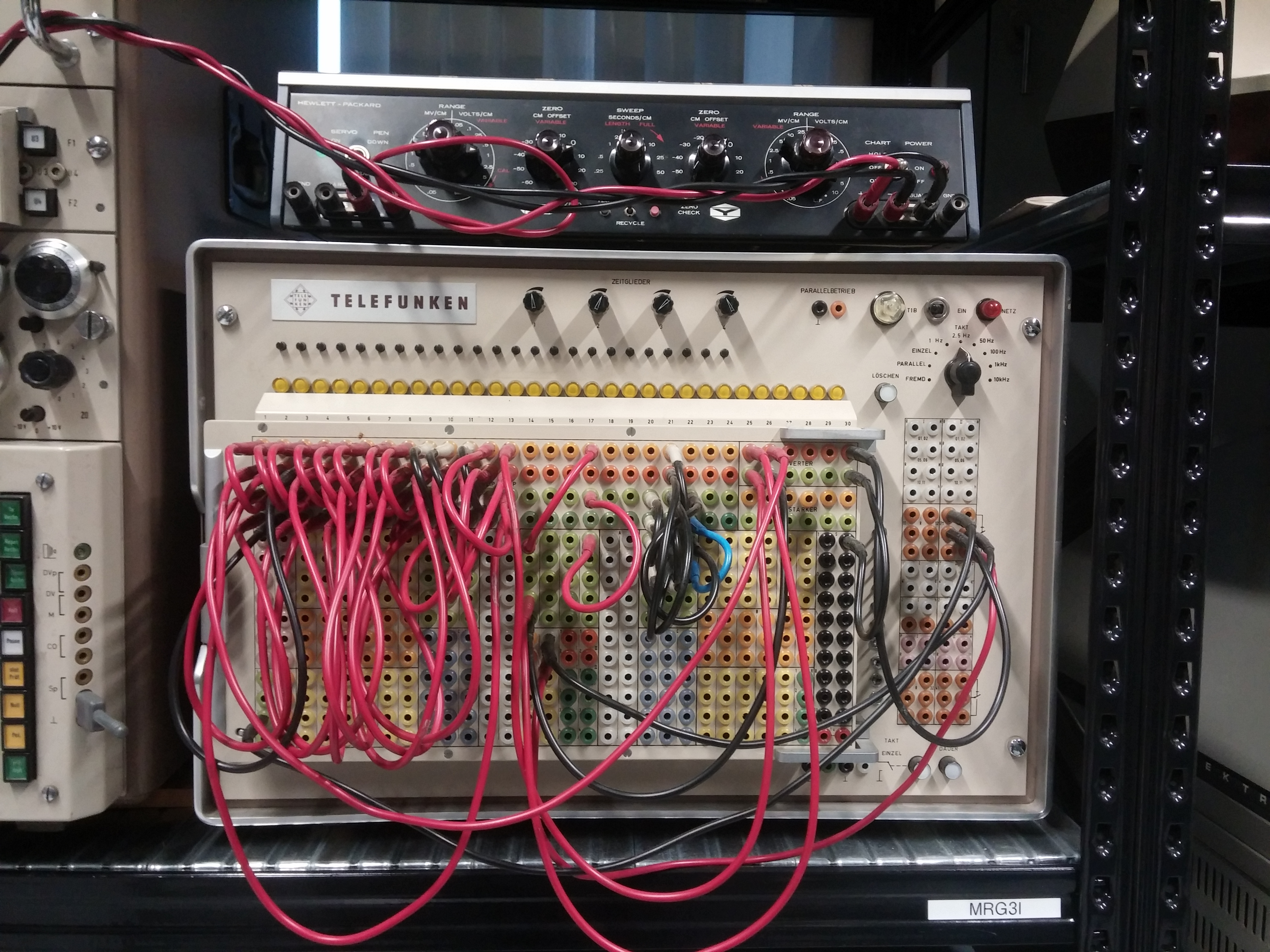
Telefunken analog computer

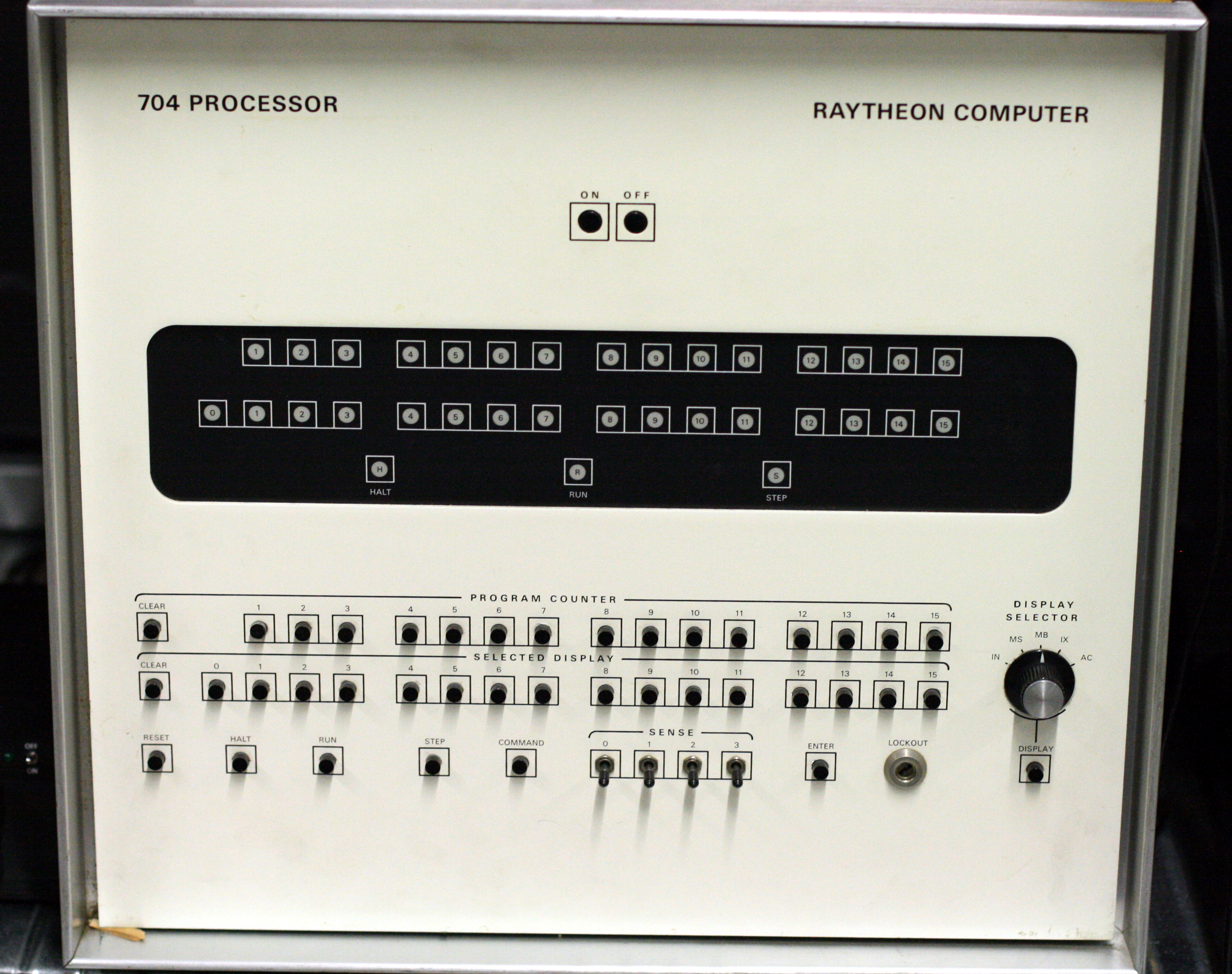
Raytheon 704 CPU

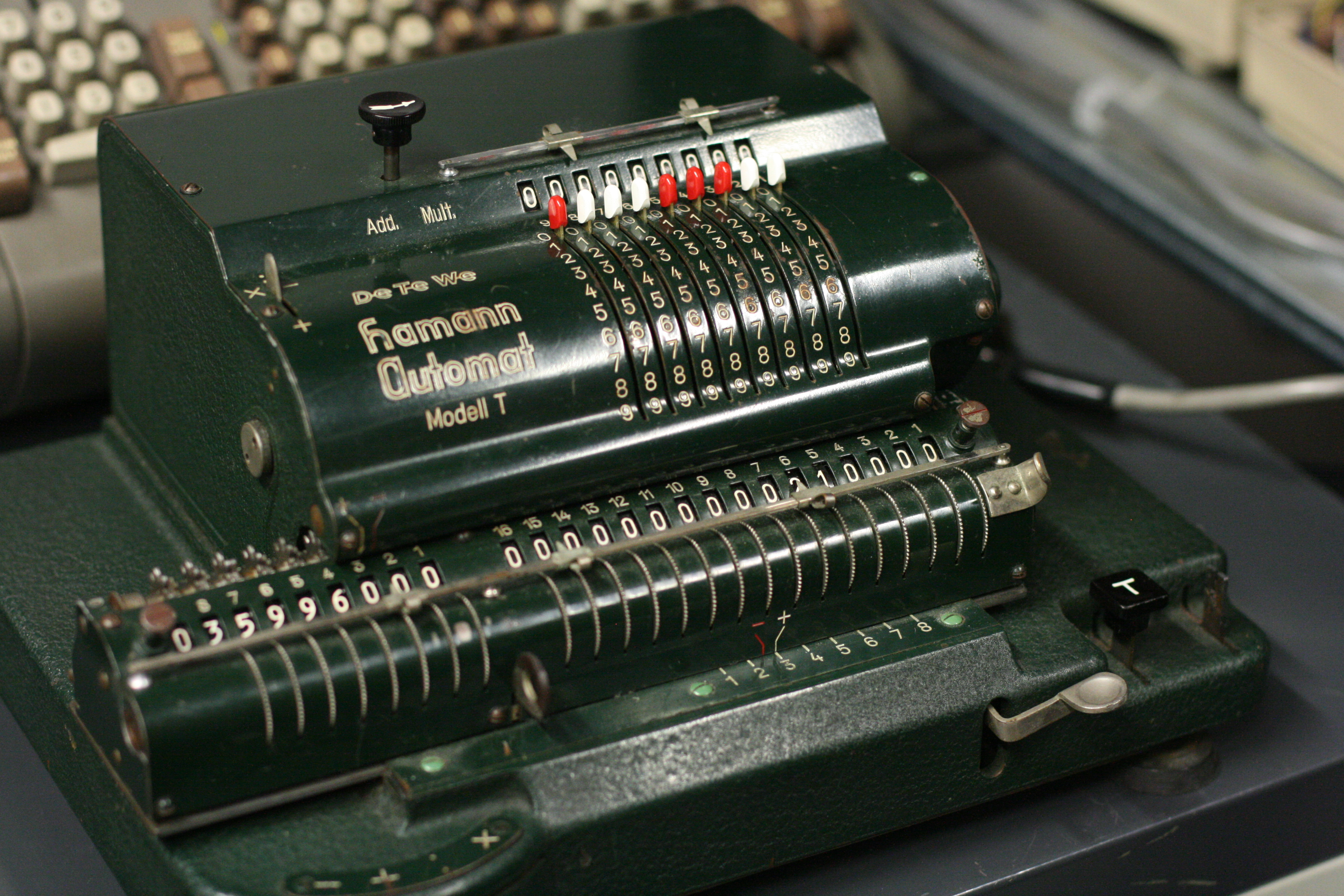
Hamann calculating machine

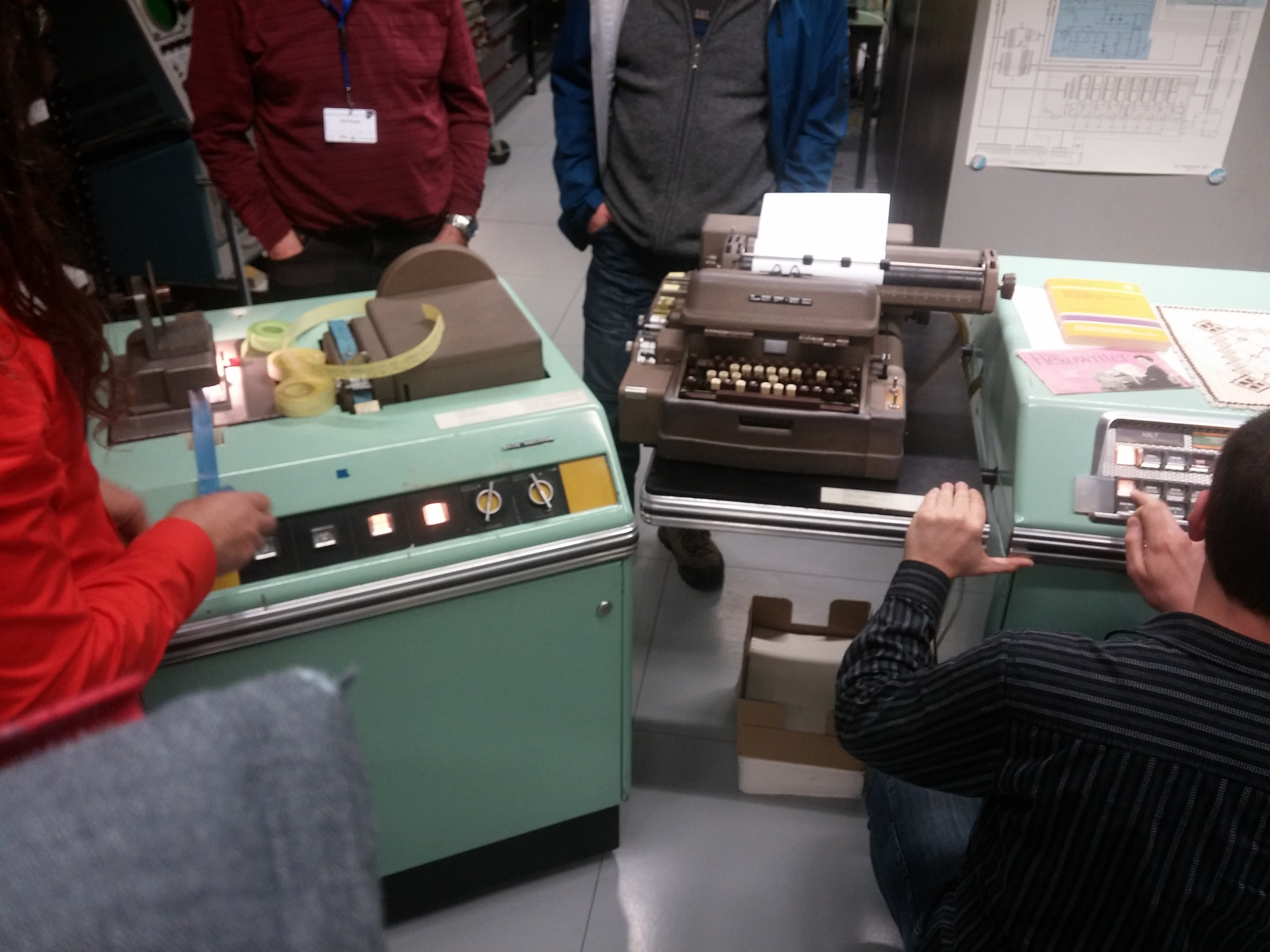
LGP-30 demonstration
