= Tim Hawarden =

South African astrophysicist

Tim Hawarden FRAS
- Born: Timothy George Hawarden; 24 December 1943; Mossel Bay, Cape Province, South Africa
- Died: 10 November 2009 (aged 65); Edinburgh, Scotland
- Education: University of Natal (Bsc); University of Cape Town (MSc, PhD)
- Known for: Passive cooling of space telescopes
- Spouse: Frances Shaw (m. 1983)
- Children: 2
- Awards: NASA Exceptional Technology Achievement Medal (2010)
- Scientific career
- Fields: Astrophysics
- Workplaces: Royal Observatory, Cape of Good Hope; South African Astronomical Observatory; Siding Spring Observatory; Royal Observatory, Edinburgh; Joint Astronomy Centre, Hawaii
- Thesis: Old Southern Open Clusters (1975)
- Doctoral advisor: Brian Warner

Timothy George Hawarden FRAS (24 December 1943 – 10 November 2009) was a South African astrophysicist known for his pioneering work on passive cooling techniques for space telescopes for which he won NASA's Exceptional Technology Achievement Medal.

== Biography ==
Hawarden was born in Mossel Bay, Cape Province, South Africa. He graduated from the University of Natal in 1966 with a BSc in Physics and Applied Mathematics, and then graduated from the University of Cape Town with an MSc in Astronomy 1970 and then a PhD in 1975 on old open clusters. While undertaking his PhD he worked as an optical astronomer at the Royal Observatory, Cape of Good Hope and then from 1972 as the Deputy Head of the Photometry Department at the South African Astronomical Observatory in Cape Town. In 1975, he worked as the Deputy Astronomer-in-Charge of the UK Schmidt Telescope at the Siding Spring Observatory in New South Wales, Australia.

In 1978, he moved to work at the Royal Observatory in Edinburgh, Scotland, from which he was based for the rest of his career. In 1981, he began working on the United Kingdom Infrared Telescope in Hawaii. In 1987, he moved to Hawaii and led the telescope's ambitious upgrades programme throughout the 1990s. He returned to Edinburgh in 2001 and became the UK Astronomy Technology Centre Project Scientist developing extremely large telescopes (ELT) before retiring in 2006 to care for his wife Frances. He remained active in the field of astronomy until his sudden death in Edinburgh in 2009.

== Passive cooling of space telescopes ==
Hawarden was involved in the development of the Infrared Space Observatory as the Co-Investigator for the infrared camera (ISOCAM) but he considered the cryogenic cooling system "horrendously complicated". The dependency of infrared space telescopes on cryogenic cooling limited the telescope's lifespan as well as adding significant weight. In the early 1980s Hawarden began developing the idea of using passive cooling for infrared space telescopes through a combination of radiators, sunshields, and by locating the telescope further from Earth. Having a telescope orbit the Sun–Earth L_{2} Lagrange point enables the sunshield to shelter the telescope from the radiant heat of the Sun, the Earth, and the Moon. A passively cooled telescope is significantly lighter and permits much larger optics and instruments.

In 1989, Hawarden proposed such a telescope, the Passively Cooled Orbiting Infrared Observatory Telescope (POIROT) to the European Space Agency but the design was rejected. In 1991, Hawarden and Harley Thronson proposed a similar design to NASA for the Edison project but the proposal was also rejected. The ideas continued to face resistance though some passive cooling was incorporated into the design of the 0.85 m (2.8 ft) diameter Spitzer Space Telescope launched in 2003. The ideas were later adopted in full for the 6.5 m (21 ft) diameter James Webb Space Telescope launched in 2021.

In 2010, Hawarden was posthumously awarded the NASA Exceptional Technology Achievement Medal for his work on passive cooling techniques, the award citing "the breakthrough concepts that made possible the James Webb Space Telescope and its successors". The award was accepted on behalf of Hawarden's widow Frances by the Nobel-laureate physicist John C. Mather.
