= The Story of Mel =

Computer programmer

The Story of Mel is an archetypical piece of computer programming folklore. Its subject, Melvin Kaye, is an exemplary "Real Programmer" whose subtle techniques fascinate his colleagues.

== Story ==
Ed Nather's The Story of Mel details the extraordinary programming prowess of a former colleague of his, "Mel", at Royal McBee Computer Corporation. Although originally written in prose, Nather's story was modified by someone into a "free verse" form which has become widespread.

Little is known about Mel Kaye, beyond the fact that he was credited with doing the "bulk of the programming" on the 1959 ACT-1 compiler for the Royal McBee LGP-30 computer. In Nather's story, Kaye is portrayed as being prone to avoiding optimizing assemblers in favor of crafting code to take advantage of hardware quirks, for example taking advantage of the rotation of the LGP-30's drum memory to avoid writing delay loops into the code.

The story, as written by Nather, involved Kaye's work on rewriting a blackjack program from the LGP-30 to a newer Royal McBee system, the RPC-4000; company sales executives had requested to modify the program so that they could flip a front panel switch and cause the program to lose (and the user to win). Kaye reluctantly acceded to the request, but to his own delight, he got the test wrong, and the switch would instead cause the program to win every time (and the user to lose).

Subsequent to Kaye's departure, Nather was asked to fix the bug. While examining the code, he was puzzled to discover that it contained what appeared to be an infinite loop, yet control did not remain inside the loop. Eventually he realized that Kaye was using self-modifying code to process elements of an array, and had coded the loop in such a way as to take advantage of an integer overflow. Adding 1 to the address field of an instruction that referred to address x normally just changed the address to x+1. But when x was already the highest possible address, not only did the address wrap around to 0, but a 1 was carried into the bits from which the opcode would be read—in this case changing the opcode to "jump to" so that the full instruction became "jump to address 0". This impressed Nather so much that, out of respect, he gave up the task and reported that he could not find the bug.

Nather recounted this story from memory, more than 20 years later. Some technical details are known to be incorrect, including the location of an "Index" flag bit in the instruction word; Kaye's use of it presumably gave Nather the vital clue that a coding trick was being used. Nevertheless there are plausible hacks which Kaye might have implemented on the actual RPC-4000 and which are largely in line with Nather's account.

The early computers of IAS machine design had no index register. Using self-modifying code was necessary for array operations. The LGP-30 instruction y 2000 did "replace the contents of the address portion of the word in memory location 2000 with the contents of the address portion of the word in the accumulator" to ease writing self-modifying code.

== History ==
The essay was originally published in the Usenet news group "net.followup" on May 21, 1983, by utastro!nather (the UUCP email address of Ed Nather at the time).

The Royal McBee computers were developed and manufactured by Librascope, and the documentation written for the blackjack program was written by Mel Kaye of Librascope Inc. The August 1956 edition of The Librazette, the Librascope newsletter, contains a story about training on the LGP-30, and mentions that some Librascope application engineers were transferred to the Royal McBee payroll. Among the engineers named is Mel Kaye.

There is a photograph on the front page of that issue showing that first class of neophyte LGP-30 programmers and the instructors, including Mel Kaye.

== See also ==
- Real Programmers Don't Use Pascal
