= General Precision Equipment =

The General Precision Equipment Corporation was an American manufacturing group that supplied equipment for the defense and space industries and produced educational equipment and controls for consumer goods. It was incorporated in Delaware in 1936 as General Theatres Equipment Corporation to take over the assets of the General Theatres Equipment, Inc. under a court-approved reorganization. The corporation subsequently changed its name to the General Precision Equipment Corporation in 1942.

Librascope, founded in 1937 by Lewis W. Imm to build and operate theater equipment, was acquired by General Precision in 1941. During World War II it worked on improving aircraft load balancing. In the mid-1950s it went on to become an early digital computer manufacturer. In 1954 GPE purchased the Griscom-Russell Company. In 1955 GPE Corporation purchased the Kearfott Company. This followed by the purchase of Graflex Inc. in 1956.

== Principal subsidiaries and affiliate, c. 1959 ==
In its brochure For an Age of Precision, General Precision Equipment Corporation described itself as a holding company that provided centralized management services to its subsidiaries. The brochure, dated approximately 1959, listed the following principal subsidiaries and their locations.

Company	Locations listed in the brochure
GPE Controls, Inc. (formerly Askania Regulator Company)	Chicago, Illinois
General Precision Laboratory Incorporated	Pleasantville, New York; Pasadena, California
Graflex, Inc.	Rochester, New York
The Griscom-Russell Company	Massillon, Ohio
The Hertner Electric Company	Cleveland, Ohio
Kearfott Company, Inc.	Little Falls, Clifton, and Paterson, New Jersey; Asheville, North Carolina; Van Nuys, California
Librascope, Incorporated	Glendale and Livermore, California
Link Aviation, Inc.	Binghamton, New York; Palo Alto, California
Air-Trainers Link Limited (listed under Link Aviation)	Aylesbury, Buckinghamshire, England
National Theatre Supply Company	New York City, with 28 branch offices
Shand and Jurs Co.	Berkeley, California
Society for Visual Education, Inc.	Chicago, Illinois
The Strong Electric Corporation	Toledo, Ohio

The brochure separately listed Royal Precision Corporation of Port Chester, New York, as an affiliate jointly owned with Royal McBee Corporation.

By 1959 the company with sales of over $215m was ranked 212th on the Fortune 500 list.

== Reorganization and acquisition by Singer ==
General Precision, Inc. was formed on January 4, 1960, through the merger of Librascope and three other subsidiaries of General Precision Equipment Corporation. It became the parent company's principal operating subsidiary and was headquartered in Tarrytown, New York.

In May 1966, GPE acquired the business of the Controls Company of America in a stock transaction. CCA, Inc. manufactured controls for household appliances, automobiles, and heating and air-conditioning equipment.

In December 1966, GPE announced an agreement in principle to combine with the Amercon Corporation in a stock transaction valued by The New York Times at $115 million. Amercon had been formed earlier that year through the merger of the American Meter Company and the Vapor Corporation. The transaction took effect on March 24, 1967, and the Amercon business continued as a General Precision Equipment subsidiary under the American Meter Company name.

In March 1968, GPE and the Singer Company agreed in principle to merge in a stock exchange valued at more than $400 million. The company formally merged into Singer on July 11th, 1968.

In 1987 Kearfott was split, the Kearfott Guidance & Navigation Corporation was sold to the Astronautics Corporation of America in 1988 and the Electronic Systems Division was purchased by GEC-Marconi in 1990 and renamed GEC-Marconi Electronic Systems.
