= Roy Henry Garstang =

Roy Henry Garstang (1925–2009) was an English astrophysicist who was internationally known for his work on light pollution.

== Family and early life ==
Garstang was born in Southport, England in September 1925 to Percy Brocklehurst and Eunice (Gledhill) Garstang. He attended Cambridge University on a Caius College scholarship. Due to the war, he completed three years of course work in two years, ultimately receiving his B.A. in 1946.

He spent 1945 to 1946 as scientific officer at the Royal Aircraft Establishment at Farnborough, England and 1946 to 1948 as scientific officer at the Ministry of Works. Returning to Cambridge, he pursued his studies in mathematics receiving an M.A. in 1950 and his Ph.D. in 1954, under the supervision of D.R. Hartree. His thesis examined atomic transitions in astrophysics. He also received a Sc.D. from Cambridge in Physics and Chemistry in 1983.

== Early work ==
Garstang started working at the Yerkes Observatory while he was still enrolled in the Ph.D. program at Cambridge. During that time, he began to calculate atomic structures and transition probabilities for forbidden transitions, which was of special interest to astrophysicists.

Upon the completion of his Ph.D., he started teaching at the University of London and served as the assistant director for the London Observatory. He also edited The Observatory magazine from 1953 through 1960.

In 1964, Garstang headed to Boulder, Colorado to join the faculty at the University of Colorado, Boulder. Soon after arriving, he was appointed Chairman of the Joint Institute for Laboratory Astrophysics. He also served as the Director of the Division of Physics and Astro-Geophysics from 1979 to 1980 and the acting Director of the Fiske Planetarium from 1980 to 1981.

During his career, he published over 50 papers, including calculations on neutral technetium and line strengths for ionized neon. He also calculated the energy levels and spectra of highly ionized species of iron, and spent time studying the effects of strong magnetic field on atomic spectra, ranging from the thousand gauss fields of sunspots to megagauss fields of white dwarfs.

== Late career ==
Later in his career, Garstang began to work on light pollution. Between 1984 and 2007, he published 40 scientific papers concerning the phenomenon, and constructed a light pollution model which included an ozone layer, scattering of light by molecules and aerosols with improved variations with altitude, curvature of the Earth, and a dust layer of dust either volcanic or desert origin. The models he created have since become standard in the field, and led to efforts to reduce light pollution in urban areas.
