= Kearfott Guidance & Navigation =

Coordinates: 40.85354°N 74.33620°W

Kearfott is a defense equipment manufacturer founded in 1918 in New Jersey, United States. It is based in Pine Brook. Today the electronics division is part of BAE Systems, while the remaining Kearfott Guidance & Navigation division is a subsidiary of the Astronautics Corporation of America. It also has locations in Black Mountain, North Carolina and Matamoros, Mexico.

== History ==
Kearfott Corporation was founded in 1918 by William Dunham Kearfott. It became the Kearfott Division of the General Precision Equipment Corporation in 1955 and then, in 1968, the Kearfott Division of Singer Business Corporation.

In 1987 Singer split Kearfott; the Kearfott Guidance & Navigation division was sold to the Astronautics Corporation of America in 1988, and the Electronic Systems Division was purchased by Plessey. In 1990 GEC-Marconi bought Plessey and renamed the unit in Wayne, New Jersey GEC-Marconi Electronic Systems.

Kearfott Guidance & Navigation Corporation officially changed its name to Kearfott Corporation effective June 1, 2008, reflecting the fact that the scope of the company's business was not limited to guidance and navigation products.

== Projects ==
Among the many vehicles and devices that contain a Kearfott built Inertial Navigation Unit (INU), is the Northrop-built RQ-4 Global Hawk. The KN-4072 and the KN-4074 are the preferred MRLG (Monolithic Ring Laser Gyro) units for Northrop's Global Hawk. The KN-4072a and the KN-4074 are based upon the KN-4071 design series, with a few key differences, most noticeably their enclosures and interfaces.

Kearfott built the inertial navigation system for the Pershing II missile and for the Space Shuttle.

Kearfott integrating gyroscopes (P/N C702519018-4) were used in the rate gyros for the Apollo Telescope Mount / Orbital Workshop (a.k.a. Skylab).
