= Ed Nather =

American astronomer (1926–2014)

R. Edward Nather
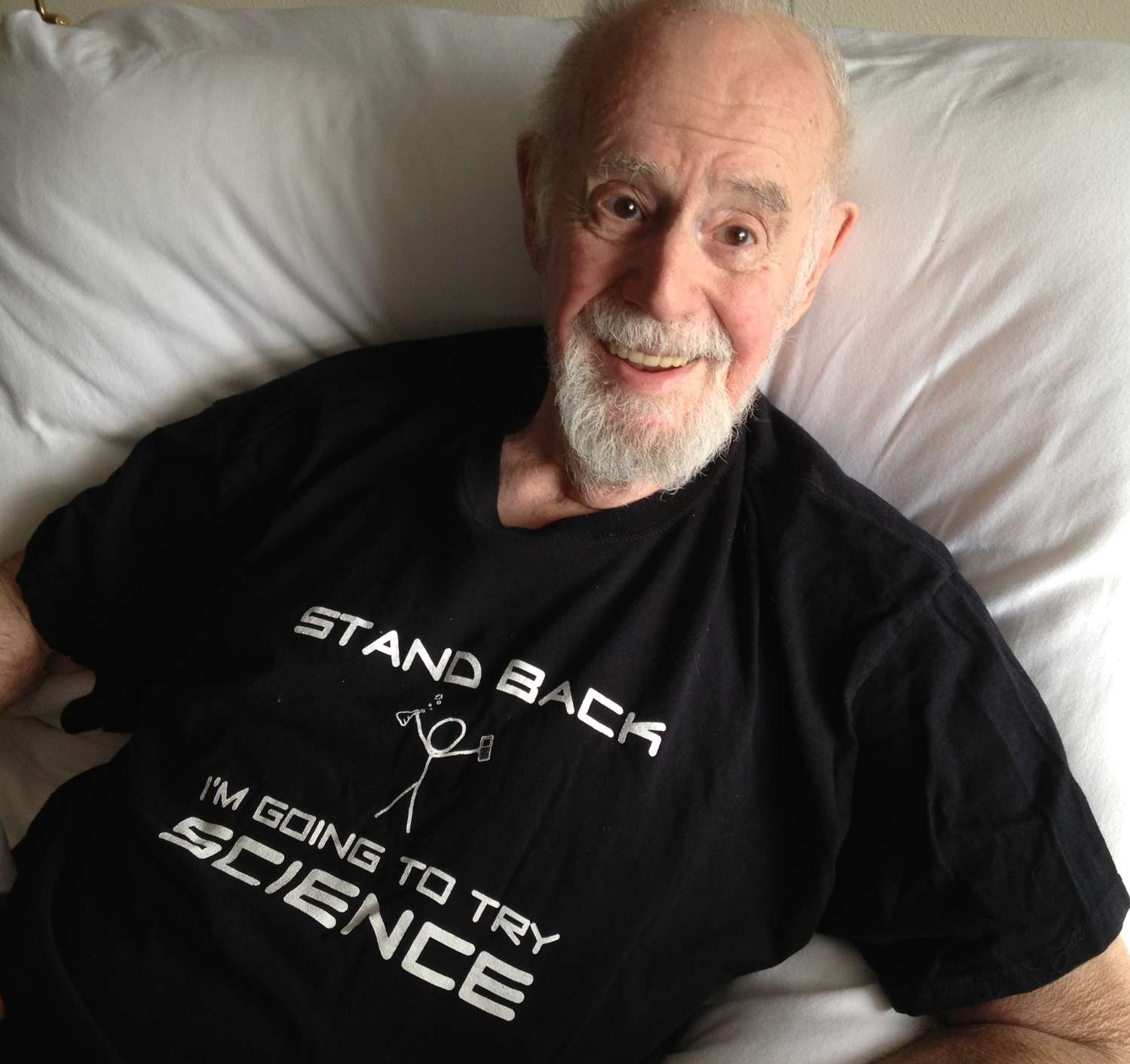
- Born: Roy Edward Nather; September 23, 1926; Helena, Montana, U.S.
- Died: August 13, 2014 (aged 87); Austin, Texas, U.S.
- Other name: Kelley Edwards (pen name)
- Education: Whitman College (B.A.); University of Cape Town (Ph.D.)
- Spouse(s): Tommie-Lou Rush (1947-1957); Virginia Wood Palm (1957-1961); Marilane Levine Nather (1962-2014)
- Children: 5
- Awards: Muhlmann Prize (2007)
- Scientific career
- Fields: Astronomy
- Workplaces: University of Texas at Austin
- Thesis: High Speed Photoelectric Photometry (1972)
- Doctoral advisor: Brian Warner
- Doctoral students: Christopher Clemens

Roy Edward Nather (September, 23 1926 – August 13, 2014) was an American astronomer, who at the time of his death, was professor emeritus in Astronomy at University of Texas at Austin. He pioneered the fields of asteroseismology of white dwarfs, and observational studies of interacting binary collapsed stars.

He served as the director of the Whole Earth Telescope for the first decade of its existence, and achieved internet fame by posting the Story of Mel, a Real Programmer, on Usenet.

== Biography ==
Nather was born September 23, 1926, in Helena, Montana, to Frederick Bucklin Nather and Florence K. Skillman. He joined the United States Navy serving in the Second World War as an electrical technician in Palawan Island, Philippines and Guam. After the war he attended Whitman College, and was awarded an undergraduate in English.

He then worked for General Electric at the Hanford Engineer Works, a nuclear production facility in Washington state built for the Manhattan Project. Using the pen name Kelley Edwards he also wrote short stories for the magazine Astounding Science Fiction.

From 1960 to 1961 Nather worked as a programmer for Royal McBee, a computer company, where he was impressed by the programming skills of his colleague Melvin Kaye. In 1983 Nather recounted a story, now known as the Story of Mel, about Kaye on the discussion network Usenet which has become a widely-shared piece of programming folklore.

Nather then worked in the nuclear instruments division of Beckman Instruments until 1967 when he joined the astronomy department at the University of Texas at Austin as an electronics engineer. He spent the first year working on the control system of the department's new 107-inch telescope. He soon began working with Brian Warner and David Evans, together pioneering the field of high-speed photometry for studying variable stars and measuring stellar radii by observing lunar occultations.

As Nather didn't hold a graduate degree he was prevented from becoming a member of the department's faculty. So he moved with his family to South Africa and completed a Ph.D. at the University of Cape Town titled High Speed Photoelectric Photometry. He returned to the University of Texas at Austin as a professor of astronomy and continued his work experimenting with photometry. He was later appointed the Rex G. Baker, Jr. and McDonald Observatory Centennial Research Professorship.

In the 1980s, with his colleague Don Winget, Nather founded the Whole Earth Telescope, an international network of telescopes that enables astronomers to continuously monitor variable stars and other celestial bodies despite the rotation of the earth. In 1997 he was awarded the Maria and Eric Muhlmann Award by the Astronomical Society of the Pacific for his work on the Whole Earth Telescope.

Nather died on August 13, 2014, in Austin, Texas, following a long illness. His wife Marilane died the following year.
