= Astronautics Corporation of America =

American avionics equipment supplier

- Type: Private
- Industry: Aerospace and defense
- Founded: 1959 Milwaukee, WI
- Headquarters: Oak Creek, Wisconsin, USA
- Key people: Nathaniel K. Zelazo, Founder; Norma Z. Paige, Founder; Dr. Ronald E. Zelazo, CEO; Stephen Givant, CFO
- Products: Commercial avionics Military avionics Space systems Cybersecurity
- Number of employees: 1,800
- Subsidiaries: Kearfott Corporation; Astronautics C.A. Ltd.
- Website: Astronautics.com

Astronautics Corporation of America (ACA) is a US supplier, designer, and manufacturer of avionics equipment to airlines, governments, commercial and defense aircraft manufacturers, and other avionics systems integrators. Products are used for air, sea, ground, missile and space applications. Over 150,000 aircraft have been equipped with Astronautics equipment. Astronautics products include electronic flight instrument systems, electronic flight bags, engine indicating and crew alerting systems, network server systems, multifunction displays, mission and display processors and systems, flight directors, flight control systems, inertial guidance systems, air data computers, and autopilots.

== History ==
In June 1959, in Milwaukee, Wisconsin, brother and sister Nate Zelazo and Norma Paige started the Astronautics Corporation of America as an advanced technology aerospace company. Zelazo had been employed by the Navy Department, and the company's small staff had an extensive background in designing and developing flight instrumentation. The company began to seek business with the military, initially working with local universities, and obtained a program from the US Air Force investigating fuel management techniques for space vehicle orbital rendezvous. It later sought further involvement in Navy, Army and Air Force flight instrumentation production programs.

Nate Zelazo, founder, in front of one of his earlier projects

In the latter half of the 1960s, Astronautics received backing from the American City Bank and Trust Company, which became bankrupt in the 1973-75 recession; Zelazo hired its former CEO, Pete Erickson, as Astronautics' CFO in 1976. Erickson worked for the company for thirteen years until his retirement, investing in the stock and bond market and arranging the purchase of a corporate building on Teutonia Avenue in the city's west side in 1982. He also handled the financial side of the purchase of Astronautics' subsidiary, Kearfott Corporation, in 1988 from Singer Corporation.

After participating in several production programs for aircraft flight instruments for the military, Astronautics developed a design and production capability, and began supplying flight instrumentation for aircraft such as the B-52, F-4, A-4, C-130, UH-1, P-3 and many others. This capability was soon expanded to provide the complete flight director systems, which included the flight director computer, for several military aircraft.

As military flight instrumentation advanced, Astronautics began competing for the cathode-ray tube (CRT) technology that was being applied to aircraft instrumentation. The company entered into a contract to provide the Horizontal Situation Display (HSD) for the Air Force F-111 Aircraft. This display program, which combined CRT and optical technologies, resulted in further expansion of Astronautics Engineering, Quality, Reliability, Production and Contract Administration Departments. Astronautics then also developed the Head Up Display for both the A-10 Aircraft and the Shuttle trainer aircraft. Astronautics then supplied medical monitors for CAT scanners and also supplied displays to NASA for the mission control center in Houston, Texas. Astronautics became an avionics supplier to the Italian, German and British governments for their high-performance aircraft.

Astronautics then made developments in flat panel displays and digital avionics. The company supplied both military and civilian aircraft with avionics and airborne servers. After acquiring Kearfott Guidance & Navigation Corporation in 1988, Astronautics provided inertial navigation systems for space and maritime use.

Astronautics produced a low-end supercomputer, the ZS-1, designed by James E. Smith of the University of Wisconsin–Madison; one was manufactured, but the model did not sell, and is exhibited at the Rhode Island Computer Museum. An RICM member believes about 20 machines were made, most sold to NASA, however, this needs verification as this is currently lacking citation.

Astronautics purchased a new corporate building in Oak Creek, Wisconsin in early 2019, and have moved most personnel to this new building in early 2020.

== Products ==
Astronautics major product lines include:

- Integrated Avionics System
- Displays - CRT and flat panel
- Electronic flight bag
- Mission & Display Processors
- Electronic Flight Instrument System
- Engine Indicating & Crew Alerting Systems
- Electromechanical Navigation & Flight Instruments
- Control and Display Units/Control Consoles
- Airborne File Servers
- Network Server Systems
- Air data computers
- Flap Control Systems
- High Accuracy Guidance and Navigation Systems
- Fire Control/Thermal Imaging Systems
- Enhanced Vision Systems
- Gyroscopes, Resolvers, Synchros, Motors, Actuators
- Magnetic refrigeration
- Worldwide Maintenance Services
