= Whole Earth Telescope =

International collaboration to observe variable stars

- Abbreviation: WET
- Founder: R. Edward Nather; Don E. Winget
- Founded at: Austin, Texas
- Fields: Astronomy
- Website: www.physics.udel.edu/gp/darc/wet/

The Whole Earth Telescope is an international network of astronomers that collaborate to study variable stars. The distribution of the observatories in longitude allow the selected targets to be continuously monitored despite the rotation of the Earth.

== History ==
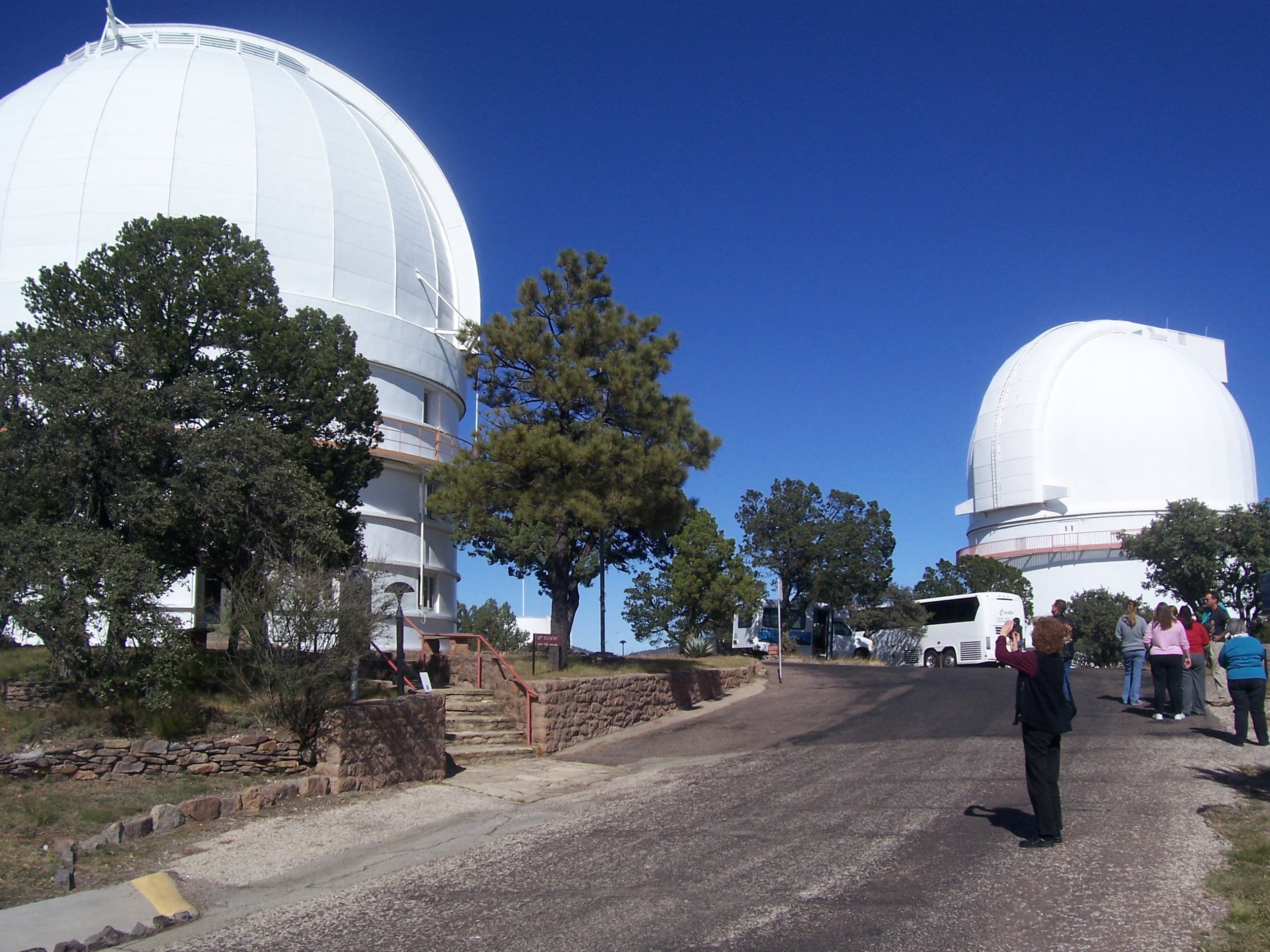
McDonald Observatory of the University of Texas at Austin is a participating site in the WET program.

This concept was devised by American astronomers R. Edward Nather and Don E. Winget of the University of Texas at Austin. The consortium consists of individual astronomers interested in collaborating to study targets designated by a principal investigator. Where colleagues are not available, astronomers are dispatched to sites that allow telescope time to visitors. Initial funding for WET came from a grant by the US National Science Foundation, which lasted through 1998.

For each site, an observing run begins when the sky is dark, and continues until stopped by weather or dawn. A photometer is used to observe the target object, a nearby comparison star, and the background sky. The data is then sent to the control center. Each site in turn takes up an overlapping observation run, so the result is, ideally, a continuous sequence of data that can then be processed. After constructing a light curve, the data is subject to a Fourier transform to obtain the frequencies of pulsation. Referred to as an XCov, the typical observing run with the WET lasts from 10 to 14 days, and is scheduled for once or twice a year.

The first observation run took place in March, 1988, and it included the Multiple Mirror Telescope in the US, a 1.8 m aperture telescope at the South African Astronomical Observatory, and the IUE observatory in orbit around the Earth. The first target for the run was the star PG 1346+082, or CR Boötis, an AM CVn star. The second target was V803 Centauri, a cataclysmic binary. The campaign was able to monitor the star systems for a continual period of 15 days from six participating sites.

The early focus of the program was the study of pulsating white dwarfs. Most such stars exhibiting non-radial pulsations have multiple pulsation modes, with some having frequencies on the order of a cycle per day. The only way to observe these extended frequencies is continually over durations longer than 24 hours. The observations of PG 1159-035 with the WET, reported in 1991, initiated the study of white dwarf seismology, later termed asteroseismology. By 1998, WET runs had been performed on pulsating white dwarfs of the DOV, DBV, and DAV types, Delta Scuti variables, a rapidly oscillating Ap star, and cataclysmic variables. A total of 16 XCov runs had been completed by May 1998, often covering more than one target per run. Only one failure was reported, for the roAp star HD 166473.

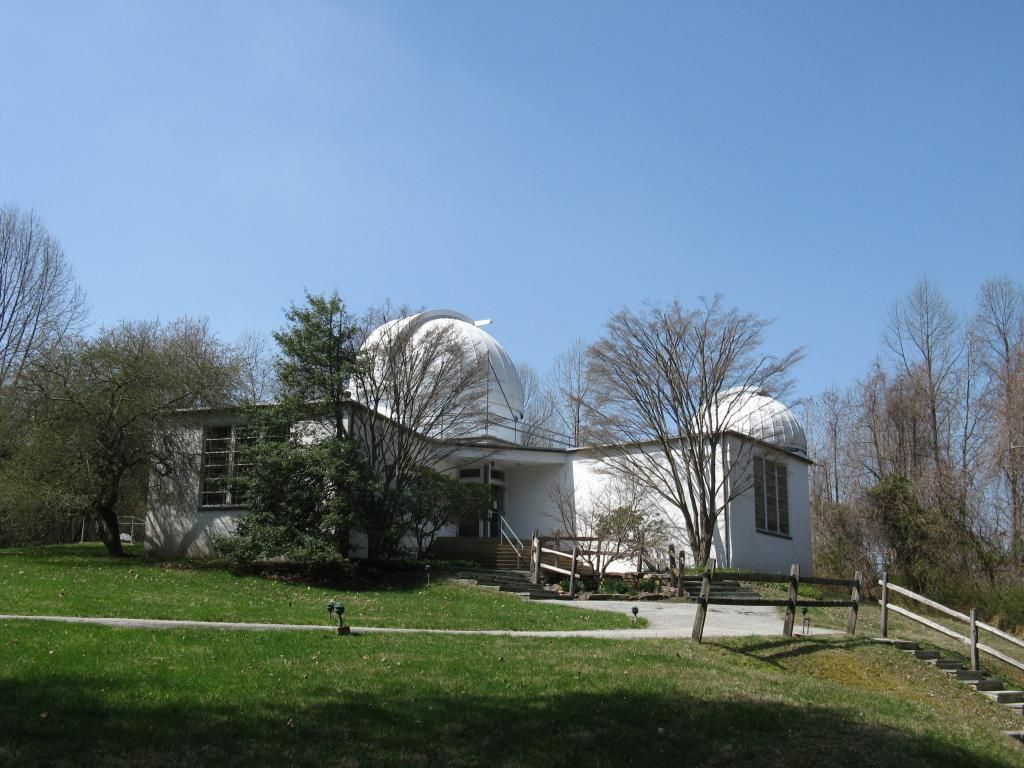
Mt. Cuba Observatory in Delaware is the current headquarters for WET operations.

Operations for WET moved to Iowa State University in 1995 when the International Institute for Theoretical and Applied Physics offered to help fund the WET program. In 2004, the governing council of WET agreed to study private funding for its operations. This resulted in the formation of the Delaware Astroseismic Research Center (DARC) the following year, and WET operations were moved from Iowa to Delaware. The first run supported by DARC was XCONV25 during May 2006. Operations are supported by the Mount Cuba Astronomical Observatory and the University of Delaware.

The ability to collect photometric data over a long period is vulnerable to weather conditions, the need to allocate time for each telescope, and the situation of each participating astronomer. It was recognized that satellites could accomplish the same task with fewer issues, but at a far higher cost. The MOST spacecraft, launched in 2003, was an early effort to pursue this application. It was able to monitor individual stars for periods of up to 30 days, but was limited to a visual magnitude of 6 or brighter. The Kepler space telescope was launched in 2009 and was able to observe some stars continuously for up to four years. As of 2021, the TESS satellite is performing asteroseismology down to magnitude 17.
