= AM Canum Venaticorum star =

Type of cataclysmic variable star

An AM Canum Venaticorum star (AM CVn star) is a rare type of cataclysmic variable star named after their type star, AM Canum Venaticorum. In these hot blue binary variables, a white dwarf accretes hydrogen-poor matter from a compact companion star.

These binaries have extremely short orbital periods (shorter than about one hour) and have unusual spectra dominated by helium with hydrogen absent or extremely weak. They are predicted to be strong sources of gravitational waves, strong enough to be detected with the Laser Interferometer Space Antenna (LISA).

== Appearance ==
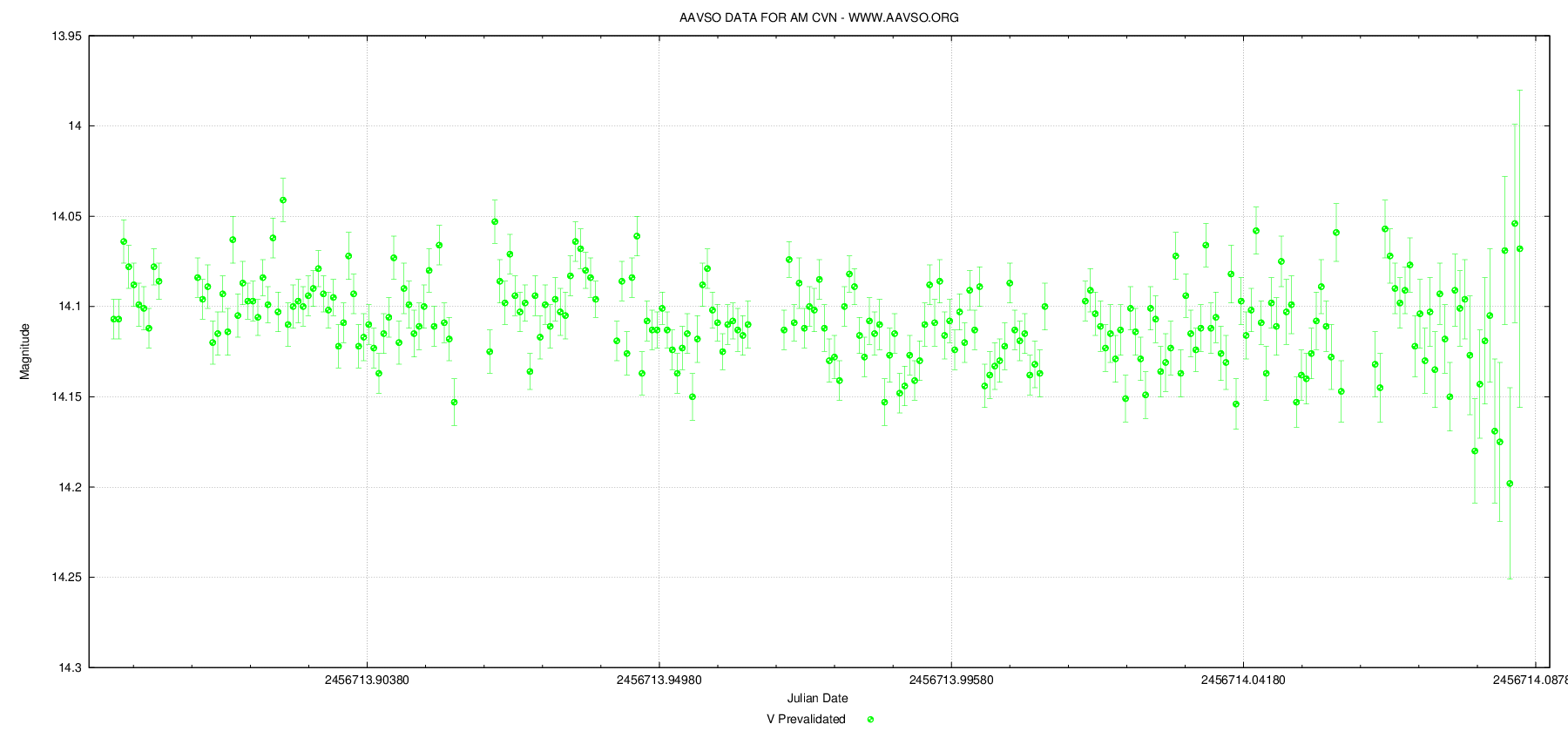
Photoelectric V light curve for AM Canum Venaticorum over a 330-minute period

AM CVn stars differ from most other cataclysmic variables (CVs) in the lack of hydrogen lines from their spectra. They show a broad continuum corresponding to hot stars with complex absorption or emission lines. Some stars show absorption lines and emission lines at different times. AM CVn stars have long been known to exhibit three types of behaviour: an outbursting state; a high state; and a low state.

In the outbursting state, stars show strong variability with periods of 20–40 minutes. The stars V803 Centauri and CR Boötis are stars that show outbursting behaviour. These stars occasionally show longer, and sometimes little brighter, superoutbursts. The interval between outbursts is longer on average for stars with longer periods. The spectra show strong helium absorption lines during the outbursts, with many weaker emission lines of helium and iron near minimum. The spectral lines are typically doubled, producing broad flat-bottom absorption lines and sharp double-peaked emission lines. This is the most common type of AM CVn variable, possibly because they are most easily detected.

In the high state, stars show brightness variations of a few tenths of a magnitude with multiple short periods, less than or around 20 minutes. AM CVn itself shows this state, along with the other bright example HP Librae. Variations often occur most strongly with one or two periods, and the beat period between them. The spectra show absorption lines mainly of helium, and the high state is so named as it is similar to a permanent outburst.

In the low state, there is no brightness variation but the spectra vary with periods longer than 40 minutes up to around an hour. GP Comae Berenices is the best-known star of this type. Spectra show mainly emission and the state is similar to a permanent minimum of the outbursting stars.

In addition to the three standard types of variability, extreme short period (< 12 minutes) stars show only tiny very rapid brightness variations. ES Ceti and V407 Vulpeculae show this behaviour.

Stars in the high state, either permanently or during an outburst, often show brightness variations with a fairly consistent period different from the orbital period. This brightness variation has a larger amplitude than the variation with the orbital period and is known as the superhump.

It is possible for AM CVn systems to show eclipses, but this is rare due to the tiny sizes of the two component stars.

== System properties ==
AM CVn systems consist of an accretor white dwarf star, a donor star consisting mostly of helium, and usually an accretion disk.

=== The components ===
The ultra-short orbital periods of 10–65 minutes indicate that both the donor star and accretor star are degenerate or semi-degenerate objects.

The accretor is always a white dwarf, with a mass between about a half and one solar mass (M_{☉}). Typically they have temperatures of 10,000–20,000 K, although in some cases this can be higher. Temperatures over 100,000 K have been proposed for some stars (e.g. ES Ceti), possibly with direct impact accretion without a disk. The accretor luminosity is usually low (fainter than absolute magnitude 10), but for some very short period systems with high accretion rates it could be as high as 5th magnitude. In most cases the accretor light output is swamped by the accretion disk. Some AM CVn variables have been detected at X-ray wavelengths. These contain extremely hot accretor stars, or possible hot spots on the accretor due to direct impact accretion.

The donor star can potentially be either a helium (or possibly hybrid) white dwarf, a low-mass helium star, or an evolved main-sequence star. In some cases a donor white dwarf may have a comparable mass to the accretor although it is inevitably somewhat lower even when the system first forms. In most cases, and in particular by the time an AM CVn system forms with a non-degenerate donor, the donor has been heavily stripped down to a tiny helium core of 0.01 M_{☉} – 0.1 M_{☉}. As the donor star is stripped it expands adiabatically (or close to it), cooling to only 10,000–20,000 K. Therefore, the donor stars in AM CVn systems are effectively invisible, although there is the possibility of detecting a brown dwarf or planet sized object orbiting a white dwarf once the accretion process has stopped.

The accretion disc is usually the main source of visible radiation. It may be as bright as absolute magnitude 5 in the high state, more typically absolute magnitude 6–8, but 3–5 magnitudes fainter in the low state. The unusual spectra typical of AM CVn systems comes from the accretion disc. The disks are formed mostly of helium from the donor star. As with dwarf novae, the high state corresponds to a hotter disk state with optically thick ionised helium, while in the low state the disk is cooler, not ionised, and transparent. The superhump variability is due to an eccentric accretion disc precessing. The precession period can be related to the ratio of the masses of the two stars, giving a way to determine the mass of even invisible donor stars.

=== Orbital states ===
The observed states have been related to four binary system states:

- Ultrashort orbital periods less than 12 minutes have no accretion disk and show direct impact of the accreting material onto the white dwarf, or possibly have a very small accretion disk.
- Systems with periods between 12 and 20 minutes form a large stable accretion disk and appear permanently in outburst, comparable to hydrogen-free nova-like variables.
- Systems with periods of 20–40 minutes form variable disks which show occasional outbursts, comparable to hydrogen-free SU UMa-type dwarf novae.
- Systems with orbital periods longer than 40 minutes form small stable accretion disks, comparable to quiescent dwarf novae.

== Formation scenarios ==
There are three possible types of donor stars in an AM CVn variable binary, although the accretor is always a white dwarf. Each binary type forms through a different evolutionary path, although all involve initially close main sequence binaries passing through one or more common envelope phases as the stars evolve away from the main sequence.

AM CVn stars with a white-dwarf donor can be formed when a binary consisting of a white dwarf and a low-mass giant evolve through a common-envelope (CE) phase. The outcome of the CE will be a double white-dwarf binary. Through the emission of gravitational radiation, the binary loses angular momentum, which causes the binary orbit to shrink. When the orbital period has shrunk to about 5 minutes, the less-massive (and the larger) of the two white dwarfs will fill its Roche lobe and start mass transfer to its companion. Soon after the onset of mass transfer, the orbital evolution will reverse and the binary orbit will expand. It is in this phase, after the period minimum, that the binary is most likely to be observed.

AM CVn stars with a helium-star donor are formed in a similar way, but in this case the giant that causes the common envelope is more massive and produces a helium star rather than a second white dwarf. A helium star is more expanded than a white dwarf, and when gravitational radiation brings the two stars into contact, it is the helium star which will fill its Roche lobe and start mass transfer, at an orbital period of roughly 10 minutes. As in the case of a white-dwarf donor, the binary orbit is expected to 'bounce' and start expanding soon after mass transfer is started, and we should typically observe the binary after the period minimum.

The third type of potential donor in an AM CVn system is the evolved main-sequence star. In this case, the secondary star does not cause a common envelope, but fills its Roche lobe near the end of the main sequence (terminal-age main sequence or TAMS). An important ingredient for this scenario is magnetic braking, which allows efficient angular-momentum loss from the orbit and hence a strong shrinkage of the orbit to ultra-short periods. The scenario is rather sensitive to the initial orbital period; if the donor star fills its Roche lobe too long before the TAMS the orbit will converge, but bounce at periods of 70–80 minutes, like ordinary CVs. If the donor starts mass transfer too long after the TAMS, the mass-transfer rate will be high and the orbit will diverge. Only a narrow range of initial periods, around this bifurcation period will lead to the ultra-short periods that are observed in AM CVn stars. The process of bringing the two stars into a close orbit under the influence of magnetic braking is called magnetic capture. AM CVn stars formed this way may be observed either before or after the period minimum (which can lie anywhere between 5 and 70 minutes, depending on exactly when the donor star filled its Roche lobe) and are assumed to have some hydrogen on their surface.

Before settling into an AM CVn state, binary systems may undergo several helium nova eruptions, of which V445 Puppis is a possible example. AM CVn systems are expected to transfer mass until one component becomes a dark sub-stellar object, but it is possible that they could result in a type Ia supernova, probably a sub-luminous form known as a type .Ia or Iax.

== See also ==
- Ultracompact X-ray binary, the X-ray binary equivalent of an AM CVn star
