= DQV =

DQV may refer to:

- Dragon Quest V: Hand of the Heavenly Bride, a video game.
- DQV star, a type of pulsating white dwarf star.
