= FG Virginis =

Variable star in the constellation Virgo

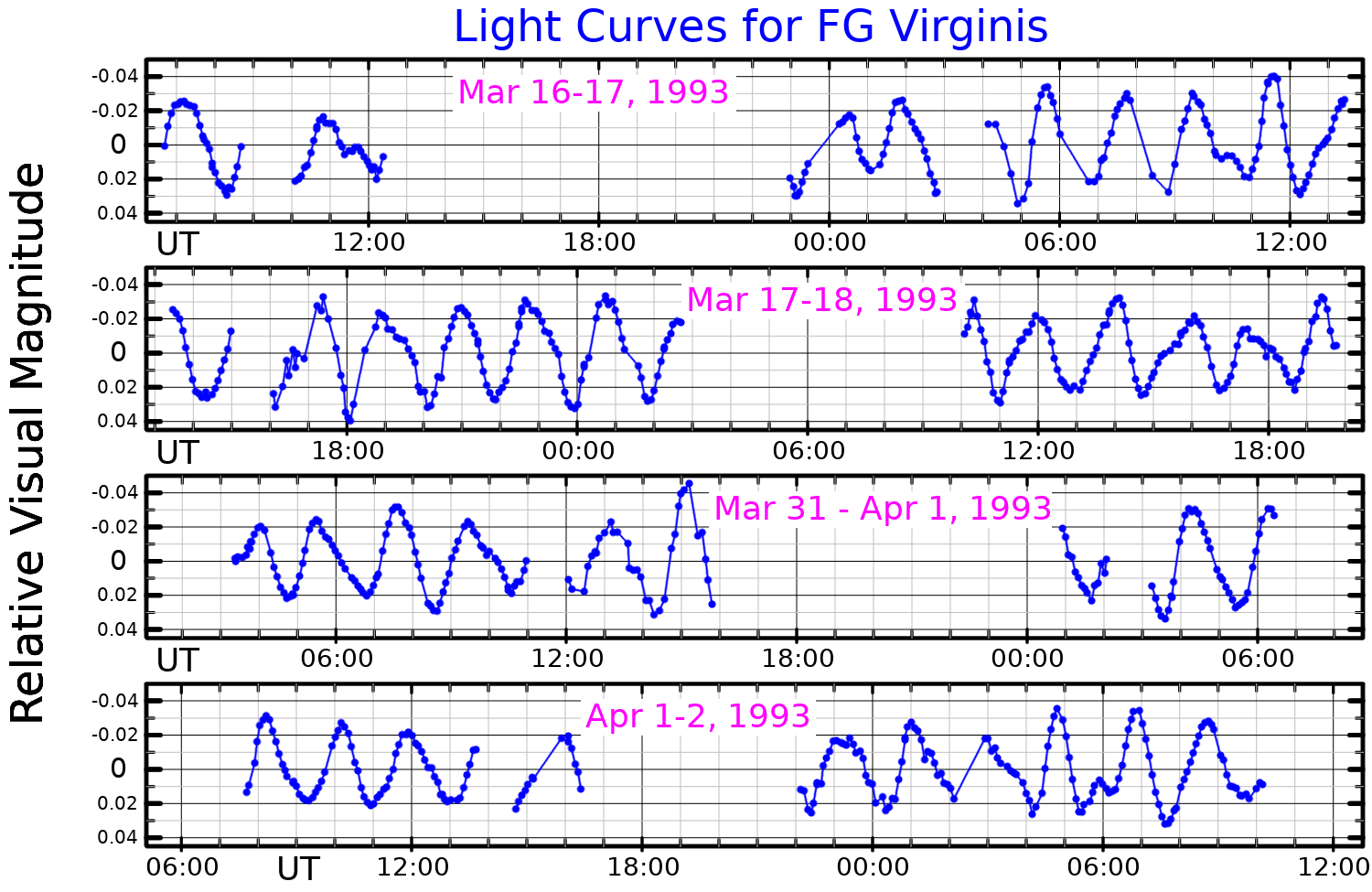
- Visual band light curves for FG Virginis, adapted from Breger et al. (1995)

Observation data Epoch J2000.0 Equinox J2000.0
- Constellation: Virgo
- Right ascension: 12^{h} 14^{m} 15.457^{s}
- Declination: −05° 42′ 59.75″
- Apparent magnitude (V): 6.53 to 6.58

Characteristics
- Evolutionary stage: Main sequence
- Spectral type: A8/9V
- U−B color index: 0.05
- B−V color index: 0.277±0.007
- Variable type: δ Sct

Astrometry
Radial velocity (R_{v})	14.2±0.5 km/s
Proper motion (μ)	RA: −85.128 mas/yr Dec.: 114.628 mas/yr
Parallax (π)	11.9261±0.0308 mas
Distance	273.5 ± 0.7 ly (83.8 ± 0.2 pc)
Absolute magnitude (M_{V})	2.10

Details
Mass	1.80 M_{☉}
Radius	2.27 R_{☉}
Luminosity	11.95 L_{☉}
Surface gravity (log g)	3.9 cgs
Temperature	7,425 K
Rotation	1.74±0.43 d
Rotational velocity (v sin i)	21.3±1.0 km/s

Other designations
- FG Vir, BD−04°3235, HD 106384, HIP 59676, SAO 138664, PPM 195288, WDS J12143-0543A

Database references
SIMBAD	data

FG Virginis is a well-studied variable star in the equatorial constellation of Virgo. It is a dim star, near the lower limit of visibility to the naked eye, with an apparent visual magnitude that ranges from 6.53 down to 6.58. The star is located at a distance of 273.5 light years from the Sun based on parallax measurements, and is drifting further away with a radial velocity of +14 km/s. Because of its position near the ecliptic, it is subject to lunar occultations.

The variability of this star was first reported by O. J. Eggen in 1971, who classified it as an ultra-short period cepheid – a proposed category of pulsating stars in the instability strip. It was subsequently grouped in the class of Delta Scuti variables, which show a pulsation period of less than a day. Observations in 1984 by P. Lopez de Coca showed at least one pulsation period with a cycle of 1.9 hours. L. Mantegazza and associates in 1994 were able to detect seven or more pulsation modes, with the previously detected dominant mode being a radial pulsation with a frequency of 12.72 cycles per day.

The star became of interest to astroseismology study because of its relatively slow rotation rate and the numerous modes of pulsation. A multi-site campaign involving the Whole Earth Telescope network was conducted in 1993 to observe this star, which detected ten modes. This was increased to 24 frequencies in 1998, then 67 independent frequencies with 79 total by 2005. Evidence suggests there are many more such modes.

This is an A-type main-sequence star with a stellar classification of A8/9V, but is near the end of its main sequence lifetime. It is classified as a Delta Scuti variable that varies in brightness with an amplitude of 0.040 in visual magnitude and a period of 1.89 hours. Element abundances are similar to the Sun, although there is a slight overabundance of barium and underabundances of sulfur and carbon. It has a projected rotational velocity of 21 km/s, but the actual rotational velocity is likely much higher at around 80 km/s.
