= G 117-B15A =

Nearby white dwarf star in the constellation Leo Minor

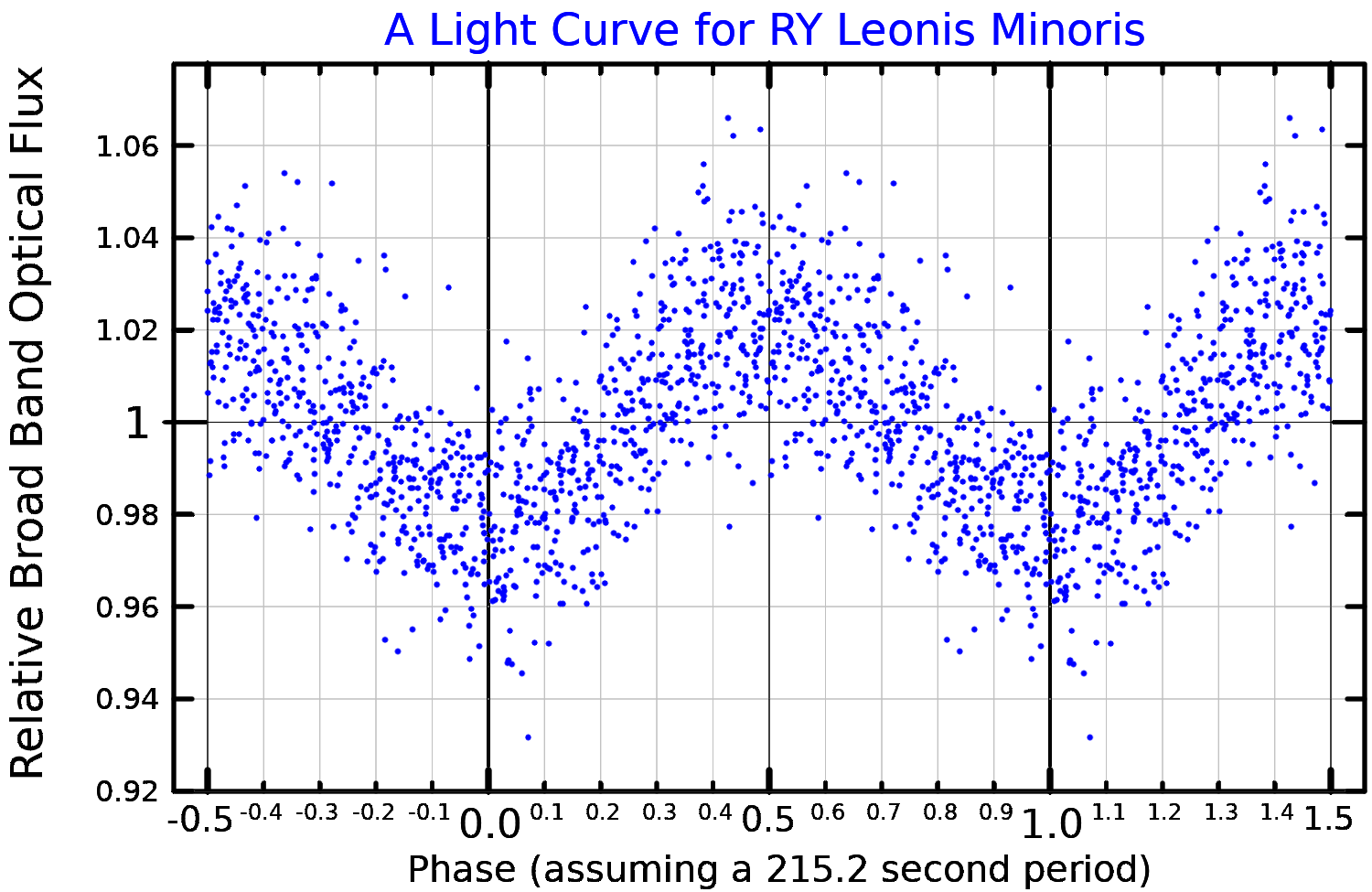
- A light curve for RY Leonis Minoris, plotted from data published by Chote et al. (2014)

Observation data Epoch J2000.0 Equinox J2000.0 (ICRS)
- Constellation: Leo Minor
- Right ascension: 09^{h} 24^{m} 15.25^{s}
- Declination: +35° 16′ 51.4″
- Apparent magnitude (V): 15.5

Characteristics
- Evolutionary stage: white dwarf
- Spectral type: DAV4
- U−B color index: −0.6
- B−V color index: +0.2
- Variable type: DAV

Astrometry
| Proper motion (μ) | RA: −145.181 mas/yr Dec.: −0.053 mas/yr |
| Parallax (π) | 17.3947±0.0452 mas |
| Distance | 187.5 ± 0.5 ly (57.5 ± 0.1 pc) |
| Absolute magnitude (M_{V}) | 11.79 |

Details
| Mass | 0.69 M_{☉} |
| Surface gravity (log g) | 8.14 cgs |
| Temperature | 12,400 K |

Other designations
- RY LMi, EGGR 65, WD 0921+354

Database references
| SIMBAD | data |

G117-B15A is a small, well-observed variable white dwarf star of the DAV, or ZZ Ceti, type in the constellation of Leo Minor.

G117-B15A was found to be variable in 1974 by Richer and Ulrych, and this was confirmed in 1976 by McGraw and Robinson. In 1984 it was demonstrated that the star's variability is due to nonradial gravity wave pulsations. As a consequence, its timescale for period change is directly proportional to its cooling timescale, allowing its cooling rate to be measured using astroseismological techniques. Its age is estimated at 400 million years. Its light curve has a dominant period of 215.2 seconds, which was initially estimated to increase by approximately one second each 8.6–35 million years, later revised to 6.2 million years. G117-B15A has been claimed to be the most stable optical clock ever found, much more stable than the ticks of an atomic clock. It is also the first pulsating white dwarf to have its main pulsation mode index identified.

An X-ray source in the constellation Leo Minor is the white dwarf G117-B15A.

== See also ==
- Ross 548
