= GD 358 =

Star in the constellation Hercules

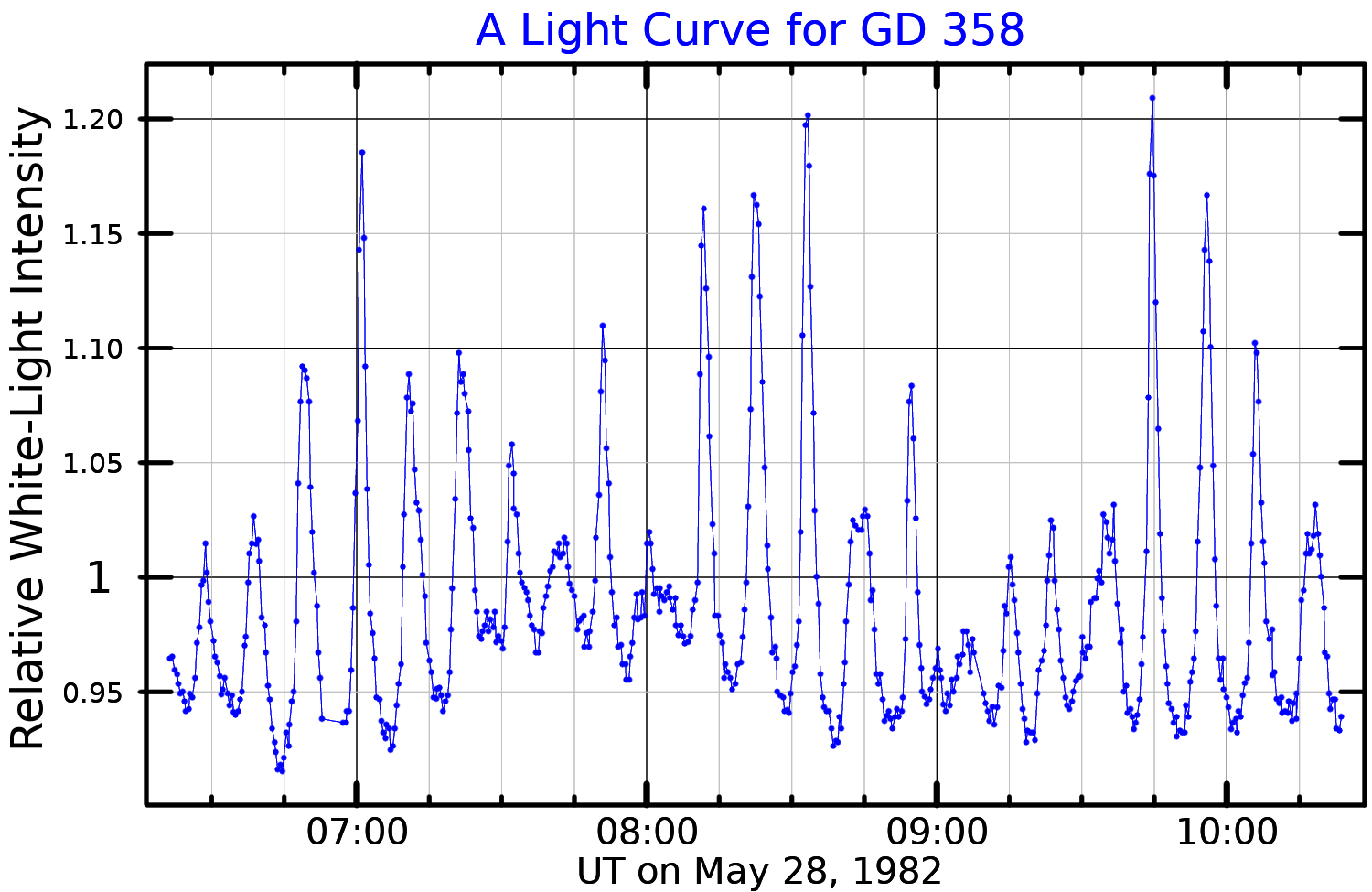
- A white-light light curve for GD 358, adapted from Winget et al. (1982)

Observation data Epoch J2000.0 Equinox ICRS
- Constellation: Hercules
- Right ascension: 16^{h} 47^{m} 19.02^{s}
- Declination: +32° 28′ 31.9″
- Apparent magnitude (V): 13.65

Characteristics
- Evolutionary stage: white dwarf
- Spectral type: DBV2
- B−V color index: -0.1
- Variable type: DBV

Astrometry
Proper motion (μ)	RA: 6 mas/yr Dec.: -162 mas/yr
Parallax (π)	23.2012±0.0298 mas
Distance	140.6 ± 0.2 ly (43.10 ± 0.06 pc)
Absolute magnitude (M_{V})	+10.33

Details
Mass	0.584+0.025 −0.019 M_{☉}
Radius	0.0132±0.0004 R_{☉}
Radius	9,170+300 −290 km
Luminosity	0.061±0.002 L_{☉}
Surface gravity (log g)	7.964+0.048 −0.043 cgs
Temperature	24,967±200 K

Other designations
- EGGR 239, V777 Her, PG 1645+325, WD 1645+325.

Database references
SIMBAD	data

GD 358 is a variable white dwarf star of the DBV type. Like other pulsating white dwarfs, its variability arises from non-radial gravity wave pulsations within the star itself. GD 358 was discovered during the 1958–1970 Lowell Observatory survey for high proper motion stars in the Northern Hemisphere. Although it did not have high proper motion, it was noticed that it was a very blue star, and hence might be a white dwarf. Greenstein confirmed this in 1969.

In 1968, Arlo U. Landolt discovered the first intrinsically variable white dwarf when he found that HL Tau 76 varied in brightness with a period of approximately 749.5 seconds, or 12.5 minutes. By the middle of the 1970s, a number of additional variable white dwarfs had been found, but, like HL Tau 76, they were all white dwarfs of spectral type DA, with hydrogen-dominated atmospheres. In 1982, calculations by Don Winget and his coworkers suggested that helium-atmosphere DB white dwarfs with surface temperatures around 19,000 K should also pulsate. Winget then searched for such stars and found that GD 358 was a variable DB, or DBV, white dwarf. This was the first prediction of a class of variable stars before their observation.^{, p. 89.} In 1985, this star was given the variable-star designation V777 Herculis, which is also another name for this class of variable stars.^{;}
