= Mount Cuba Astronomical Observatory =

Observatory in Delaware, US

Coordinates: 39.78500°N 75.63333°W

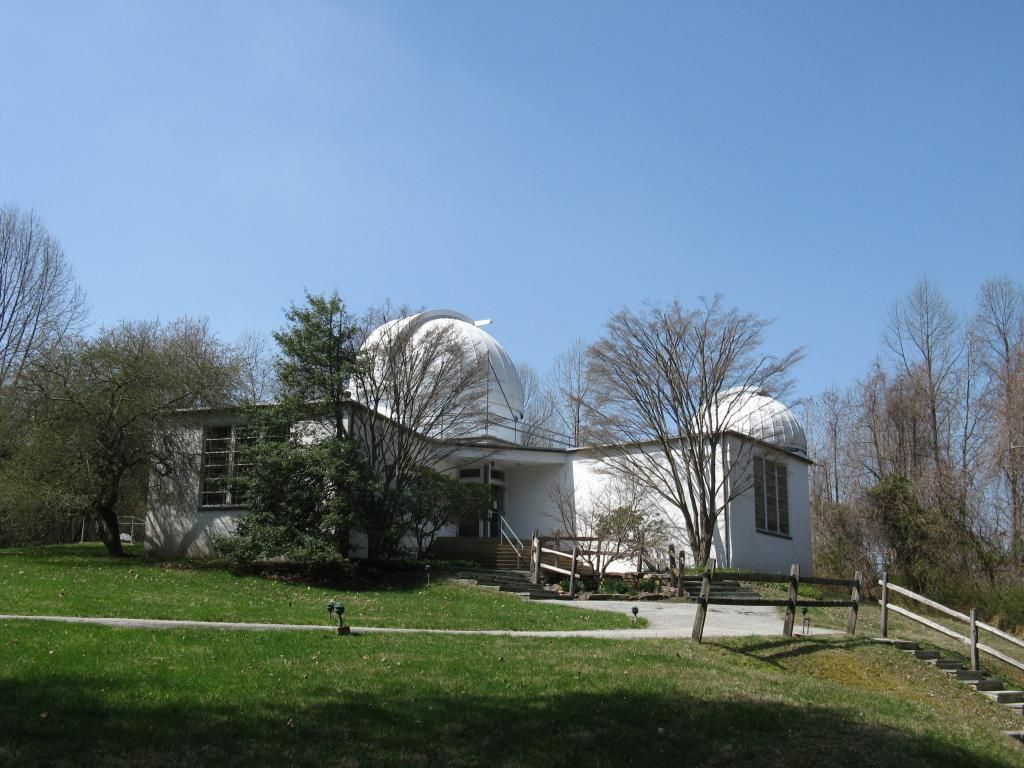
Mount Cuba Astronomical Observatory

Mount Cuba Astronomical Observatory is an astronomical observatory in Greenville, Delaware, United States. It is home to a 0.6-meter telescope used by the Delaware Astronomical Society, the University of Delaware, and the Whole Earth Telescope.

A Sunquest sundial, designed and machined by Richard L. Schmoyer, is on the Mount Cuba Observatory grounds near the parking lot. This mean time sundial automatically corrects for the equation of time through the use of an analemma-inspired gnomon.

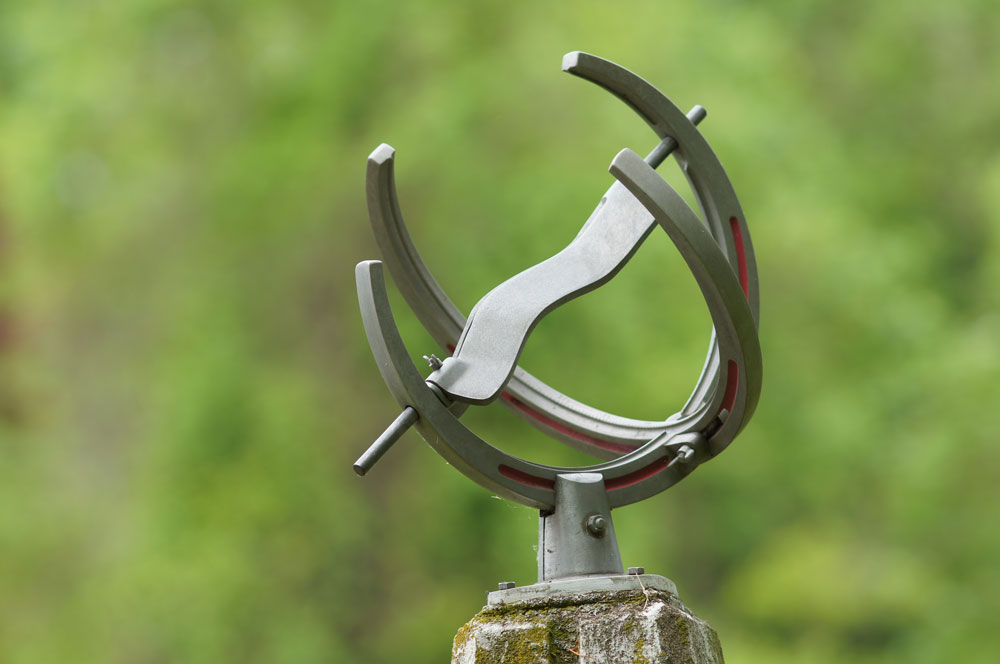
Sunquest sundial, designed by Richard L. Schmoyer, at the Mount Cuba Observatory in Greenville, Delaware

== See also ==
- Mt. Cuba Center
- List of astronomical observatories
