= V803 Centauri =

Star in the constellation Centaurus

V803 Cen
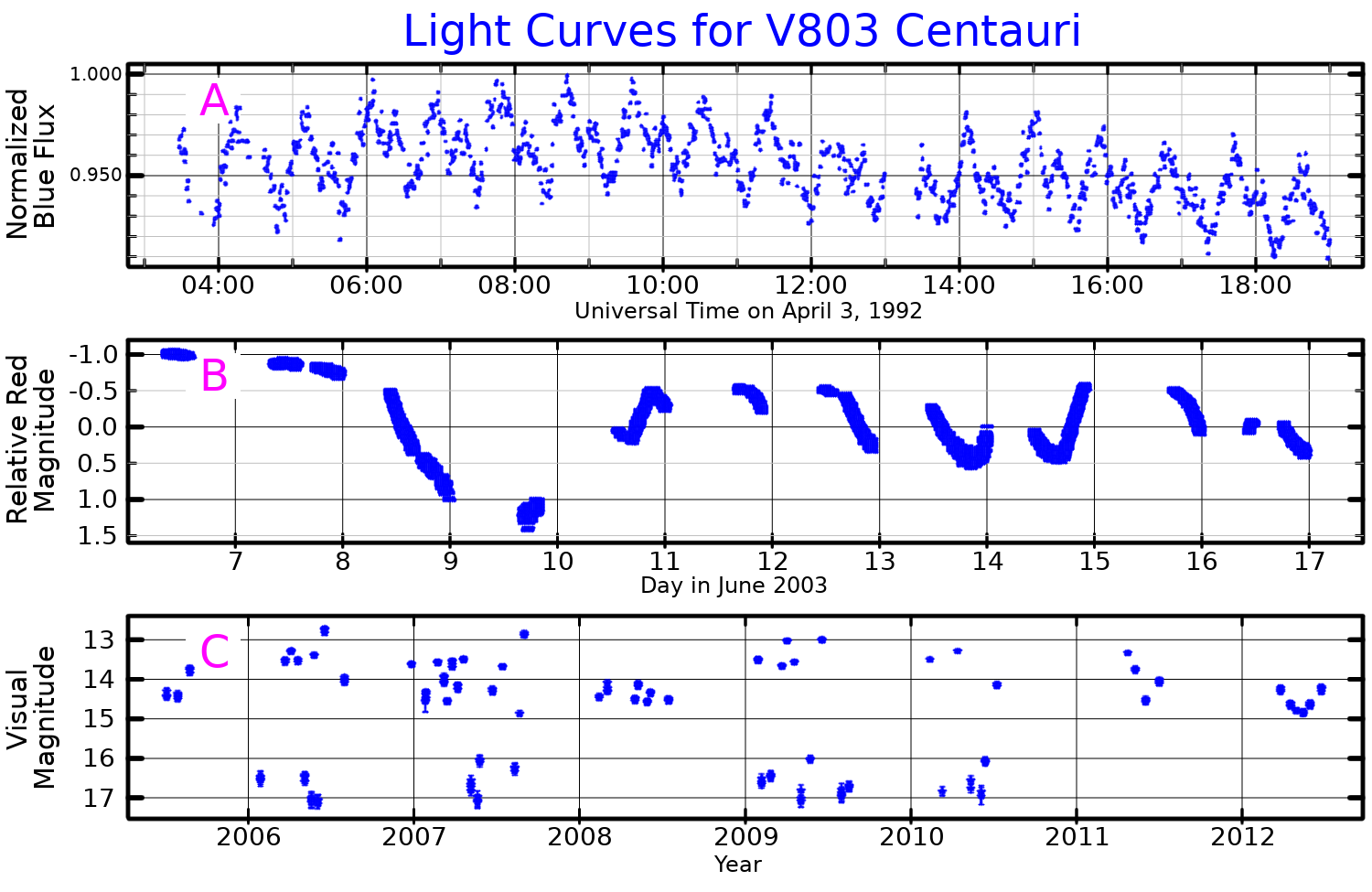
- Three light curves for V803 Centauri, on three timescales, hours (plot A), days (plot B) and years (plot C). Adapted from Patterson et al. (2000), Kato et al. (2004) and Levitan et al. (2015)

Observation data Epoch J2000.0 Equinox ICRS
- Constellation: Centaurus
- Right ascension: 13^{h} 23^{m} 44.54^{s}
- Declination: −41° 44′ 29.54″
- Apparent magnitude (V): 12.7 - 17.7

Characteristics
- Spectral type: pec
- U−B color index: −0.9 - −1.0
- B−V color index: +0.1
- Variable type: AM CVn

Astrometry
Proper motion (μ)	RA: −3.907 mas/yr Dec.: +11.978 mas/yr
Parallax (π)	3.4885±0.0599 mas
Distance	930 ± 20 ly (287 ± 5 pc)
Absolute magnitude (M_{V})	5.93

Details

White dwarf
Mass	0.8 - 1.2 M_{☉}

Donor star
Mass	0.06 - 0.11 M_{☉}

Other designations
- V803 Centauri, V803 Cen, AE-1, 2MASS J13234454-4144294, AAVSO 1317-41.

Database references
SIMBAD	data

V803 Centauri (V803 Cen) is a cataclysmic binary consisting of a dwarf helium star losing mass to a white dwarf. It is an example of the AM Canum Venaticorum (AM CVn) type of cataclysmic variable stars.

Aina Margareta Elvius announced the discovery of this star in 1975. It was given its variable star designation, V803 Centauri, in 1978. The light curve shows a "low state" at about magnitude 17, with rapid outbursts of several magnitudes lasting only a few days or brighter super-outbursts lasting a few weeks, and a "high state" at up to 13th magnitude. V803 Centauri is most often seen in the high state, where it may stay bright for a year or more.

The donor star has been radically stripped of material and now only around 0.1 M_{☉} remains. With its outer layers removed, the helium core has expanded and cooled and is almost impossible to detect directly. The accreting white dwarf has a temperature around 14,000 K. Most of the light from V803 Cen is produced by an accretion disk, especially when the system is in outburst. The accretion disk shows a blackbody temperature around 30,000 K.
