= CR Boötis =

Star system in the constellation Boötes

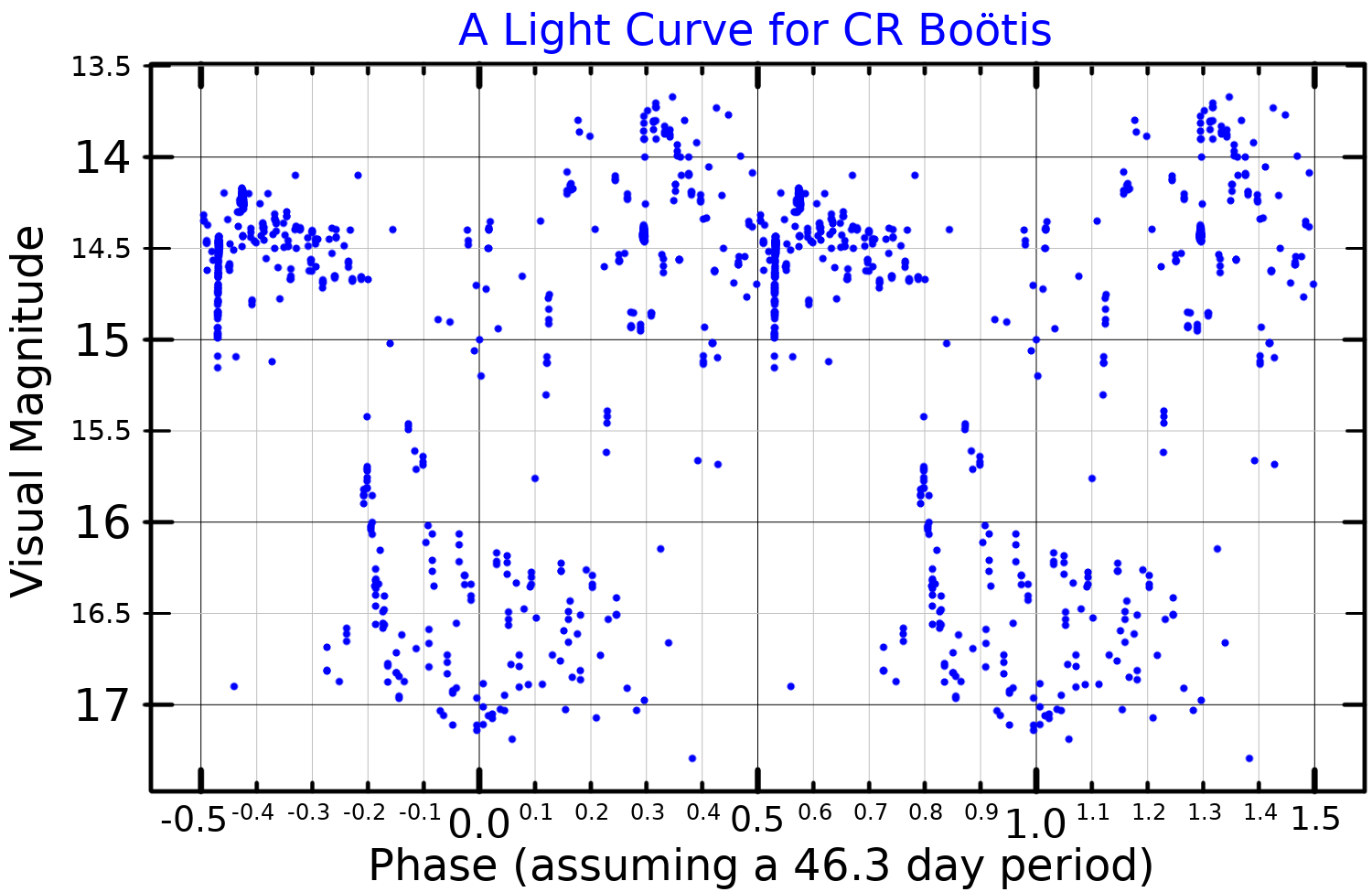
- A visual band light curve for CR Boötis, plotted from 2019 AAVSO data. The data have been folded with the supercycle period found by Kato et al.

Observation data Epoch J2000 Equinox J2000
- Constellation: Boötes
- Right ascension: 13^{h} 48^{m} 55.222^{s}
- Declination: +07° 57′ 35.72″
- Apparent magnitude (V): 13.0 to 17.5

Characteristics
- Evolutionary stage: Double white dwarf
- Variable type: Dwarf nova(?)

Astrometry
Proper motion (μ)	RA: –34.412 mas/yr Dec.: 13.105 mas/yr
Parallax (π)	2.8438±0.0367 mas
Distance	1,150 ± 10 ly (352 ± 5 pc)

Details

Primary
Mass	0.80 M_{☉}
Radius	0.012 R_{☉}

Donor star
Mass	0.07 M_{☉}
Radius	0.0526 R_{☉}

Other designations
- CR Boo, SDSS J134855.21+075735.7, PG 1346+082, AAVSO 1344+08

Database references
SIMBAD	data

CR Boötis is an interacting binary system in the northern constellation of Boötes, abbreviated CR Boo. It is one of the best-known AM Canum Venaticorum stars. The system varies widely in brightness, ranging in apparent visual magnitude from 13.6 down to 17.5. The distance to this system is approximately 1,150 light years from the Sun, based on parallax measurements.

The variable luminosity of this object was discovered in 1983 by M. A. Wood and associates, with a light curve that is very similar to that of AM Canum Venaticorum. It was found to have an ultraviolet excess by the Palomar-Green survey and assigned the identifier PG 1346+082 in 1986. The system varies in both its photometric and spectroscopic properties, with a photometric quasi-period of 4–5 days. The optical spectrum displays only lines of helium. It was given its variable star designation, CR Boötis, in 1987, in literature up until that time it was called PG 1346+082.

Rapid flickering suggests this is a close binary system undergoing mass transfer, while emission by neutral helium indicates there is a thick accretion disk orbiting a compact object. The lack of X-ray emission means this accreting object is a white dwarf, rather than something more massive. The lack of hydrogen in the spectrum demonstrates that the donor star is a helium white dwarf with a lower mass than the primary. The pair have a brief orbital period of 24.522 minutes with a mass ratio of 0.101±0.004. The orbital plane is inclined at an angle of about 30° to the line of sight from the Earth.

This system displays two different states. The first is a lower state of quiescence that displays regular superoutbursts similar to ER Ursae Majoris on a roughly 46 day cycle. The second state is brighter with frequent outbursts. The system becomes bluer during superoutbursts, with a higher temperature.
