= Don Winget =

American astronomer and astrophysicist

Donald Earl Winget
- Education: Ph.D.
- Alma mater: University of Rochester
- Awards: Robert J. Trumpler Award; Newton Lacy Pierce Prize in Astronomy
- Scientific career
- Institutions: University of Texas at Austin
- Doctoral students: Christopher Clemens

Don E. Winget is an American astronomer and astrophysicist who studies white dwarf stars. He is the Harlan J. Smith Centennial Professor in Astronomy and a university distinguished teaching professor at the University of Texas at Austin.

== Research ==
Much of Winget's research concerns the study of white dwarf stars.

Winget's doctoral research at the University of Rochester predicted the existence of DBV stars, a certain class of pulsating white dwarf. After becoming a faculty member at the University of Texas, he and his colleagues discovered GD 358, a star of this class, fulfilling the prediction of his dissertation and marking the first time in which a class of variable stars was predicted to exist before any instances of it were observed.

With Ed Nather, his colleague at University of Texas, Winget introduced the technique for studying the seismology and the inner structure of white dwarfs called "Whole Earth Telescope". The technique involves coordinating a network of small telescopes around the world to capture small variations in the light output of a white dwarf caused by its seismic oscillations.

One of Winget's projects involves studying white dwarfs using the Z machine pulsed-power electromagnetic wave generator at the Sandia National Lab in New Mexico.

== Recognition ==
In 1983, Winget was awarded the Robert J. Trumpler Award for an outstanding doctoral dissertation by the Astronomical Society of the Pacific. He received the 1987 Newton Lacy Pierce Prize in Astronomy from the American Astronomical Society.
