= PG 1159-035 =

Star in the constellation Virgo

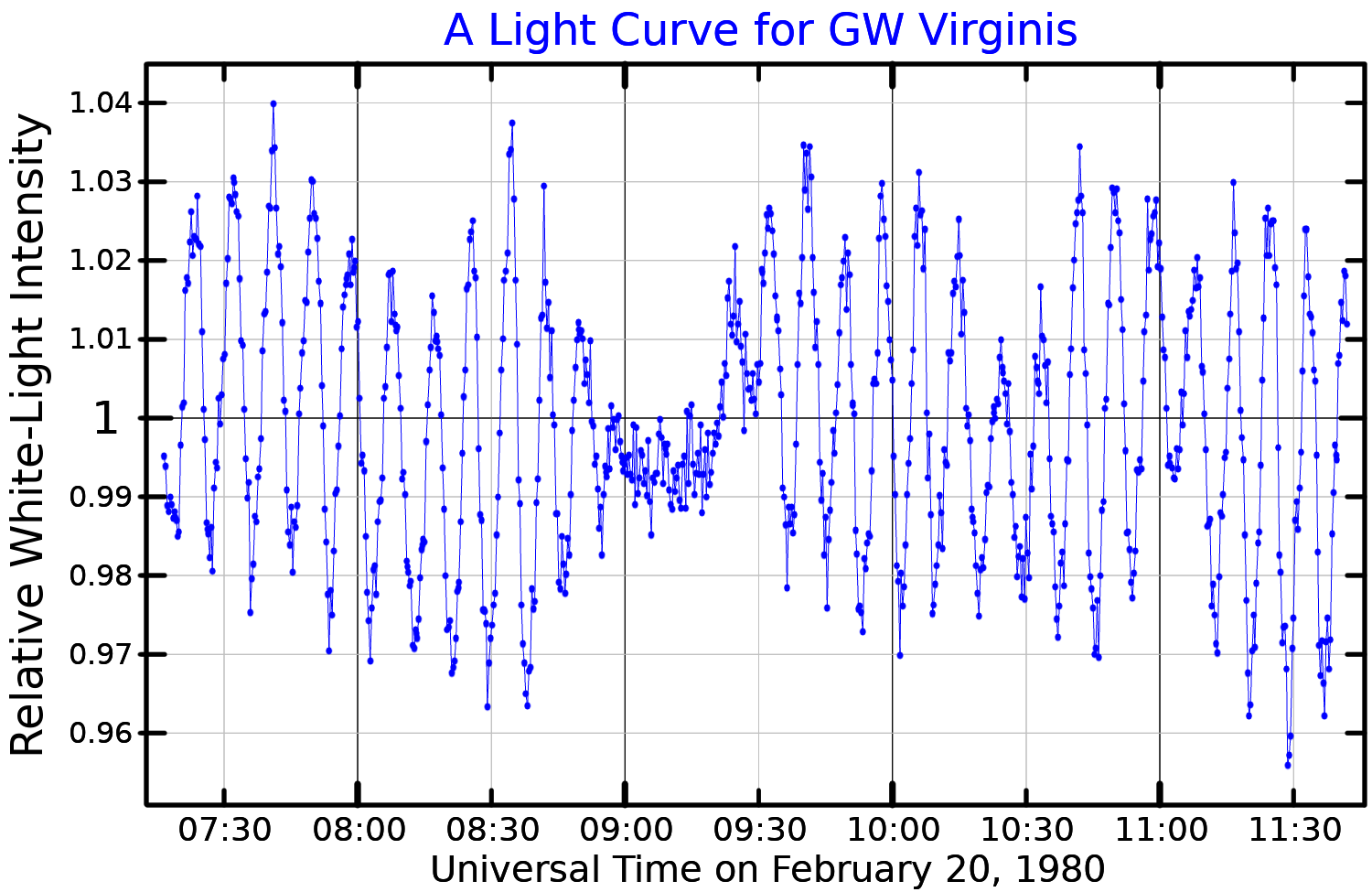
- A light curve for GW Virginis, adapted from Winget et al. (1985)

Observation data Epoch J2000.0 (ICRS) Equinox ICRS
- Constellation: Virgo
- Right ascension: 12^{h} 01^{m} 45.9731^{s}
- Declination: −03° 45′ 40.629″
- Apparent magnitude (V): 14.9

Characteristics
- Evolutionary stage: PG 1159
- Spectral type: DOQZ1
- Variable type: GW Vir

Astrometry
Proper motion (μ)	RA: −14.495 mas/yr Dec.: −3.207 mas/yr
Parallax (π)	1.6905±0.0642 mas
Distance	1,930 ± 70 ly (590 ± 20 pc)

Details
Mass	0.63 M_{☉}
Radius	0.0254 ± 0.005 R_{☉}
Luminosity (bolometric)	200 L_{☉}
Surface gravity (log g)	7.59 cgs
Temperature	136,000 K

Other designations
- GW Vir, GW Virginis, 2E 2572, WD 1159-034

Database references
SIMBAD	data

PG 1159-035 is the prototypical PG 1159 star after which the class of PG 1159 stars was named. It was discovered in the Palomar-Green survey of ultraviolet-excess stellar objects and, like the other PG 1159 stars, is in transition between being the central star of a planetary nebula and being a white dwarf.

The luminosity of PG 1159-035 was observed to vary in 1979, and it was given the variable star designation GW Virginis (abbreviation GW Vir) in 1985. Variable PG 1159 stars may be called GW Vir stars, or the class may be split into DOV and PNNV stars. The variability of PG 1139-035, like that of other GW Vir stars, arises from non-radial gravity wave pulsations within itself. Its light curve was observed intensively by the Whole Earth Telescope over a 264-hour period in March 1989, and over 100 of its vibrational modes have been found in the resulting vibrational spectrum, with periods ranging from 300 to 1,000 seconds.
