= GP Comae Berenices =

White dwarf system in the constellation Coma Berenices

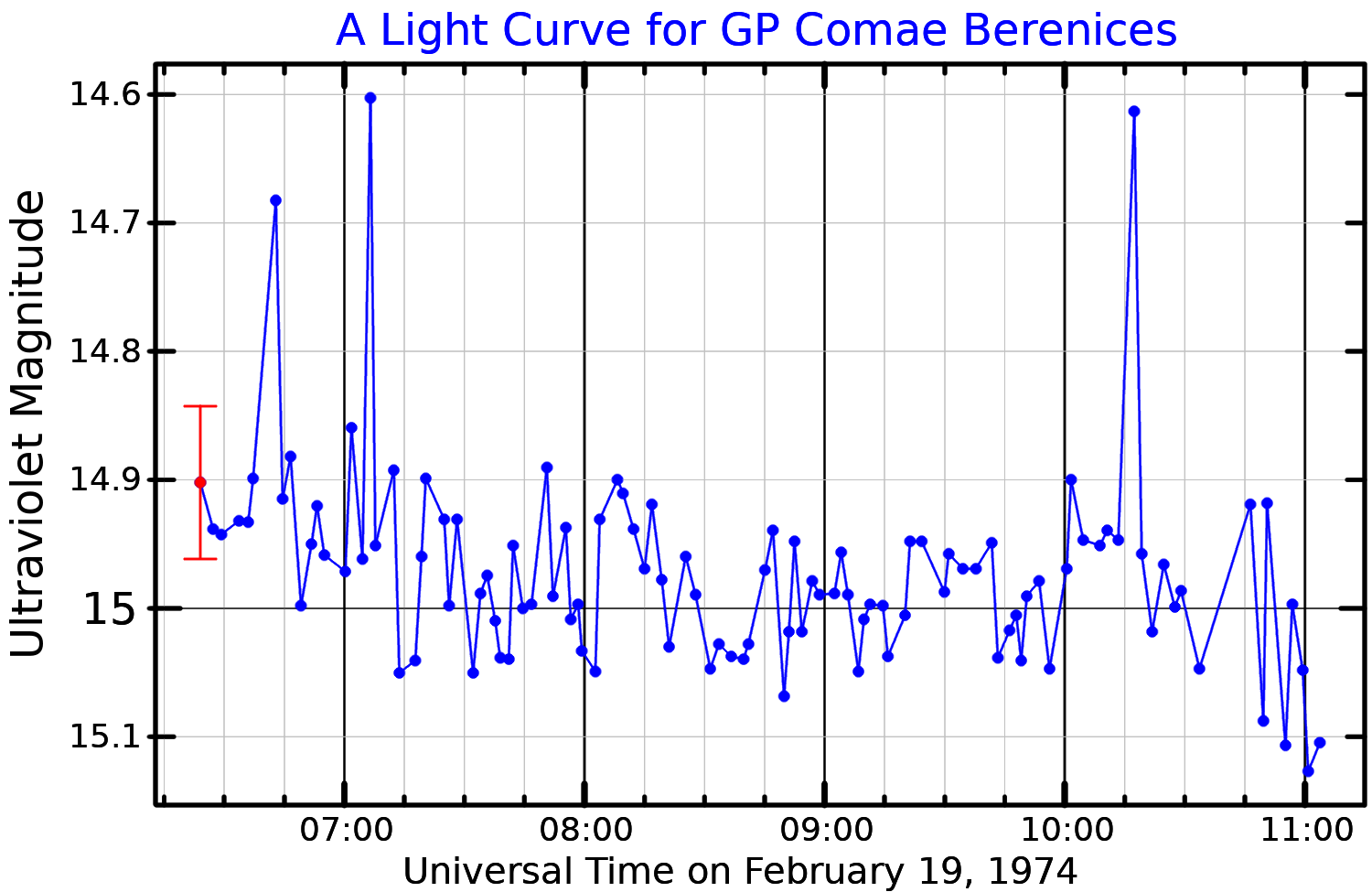
- An ultraviolet band light curve for GP Comae Berenices, adapted from Smak (1975). The error bar shown on the leftmost point applies to all points.

Observation data Epoch J2000 Equinox ICRS
- Constellation: Coma Berenices
- Right ascension: 13^{h} 05^{m} 42.401^{s}
- Declination: +18° 01′ 03.76″
- Apparent magnitude (V): 15.69

Characteristics
- Evolutionary stage: White dwarf
- Spectral type: DBe
- Apparent magnitude (g): 15.929
- Variable type: AM CVn

Astrometry
Proper motion (μ)	RA: −344.92±0.06 mas/yr Dec.: 34.85±0.06 mas/yr
Parallax (π)	13.7306±0.0452 mas
Distance	237.5 ± 0.8 ly (72.8 ± 0.2 pc)

Details
Mass	0.59±0.09 M_{☉}
Temperature	14,800±500 K

Other designations
- G 61-29, LTT 18284, WD 1303+18, 2MASS J13054243+1801039, Gaia DR2 3938156295111047680

Database references
SIMBAD	data

GP Comae Berenices, abbreviated to GP Com and also known as G 61-29, is a star system composed of a white dwarf orbited by a planetary mass object, likely the highly eroded core of another white dwarf star. The white dwarf is slowly accreting material from its satellite at a rate of (3.5±0.5)×10^{−11} M_{☉}/year and was proven to be a low-activity AM CVn star. The star system is showing signs of a high abundance of ionized nitrogen from the accretion disk around the primary.

In 1971, Brian Warner discovered that the star, then known as G61-29, is a variable star. it was given its variable star designation, GP Comae Berenices, in 1975.

== Planetary system ==
The material emitted from the substellar companion is mostly helium, with a molar ratio of nitrogen up to 1.7%, very low neon levels and other elements not detectable at all. Approximately half of the luminosity of the system comes from the accretion disk. The planetary object is suspected to contain a strange quark matter core due to its unusually high density, which must be above 187.5 g/cm^{3} to prevent tidal disruption; the theoretical bound for planets composed solely of ordinary matter is on the order of 30 g/cm^{3}. The object's orbit is expected to decay within 100 million years due to gravitational wave emission.

The GP Com planetary system
Companion (in order from star)	Mass	Semimajor axis (AU)	Orbital period (seconds)	Eccentricity	Inclination (°)	Radius
b	10.5±1.5 M_{J}	0.0014	2794	0	59.5±14.5	≤ 0.420±0.020 R_{J}
