= PG 1159 star =

Transitional stellar stage before becoming a white dwarf

A PG 1159 star, often also called a pre-degenerate, is a star with a hydrogen-deficient atmosphere that is in transition between being the central star of a planetary nebula and being a hot white dwarf. These stars are hot, with surface temperatures between 75,000 K and 200,000 K, and are characterized by atmospheres with little hydrogen and absorption lines for helium, carbon and oxygen. Their surface gravity is typically between 10^{4} and 10^{6} meters per second squared. Some PG 1159 stars are still fusing helium.^{, § 2.1.1, 2.1.2, Table 2.} The PG 1159 stars are named after their prototype, PG 1159-035. This star, found in the Palomar-Green survey of ultraviolet-excess stellar objects, was the first PG 1159 star discovered.

It is thought that the atmospheric composition of PG 1159 stars is odd because, after they have left the asymptotic giant branch, they have reignited helium fusion. As a result, a PG 1159 star's atmosphere is a mixture of material which was between the hydrogen- and helium-burning shells of its AGB star progenitor.^{, §1.} They are believed to eventually lose mass, cool, and become DO white dwarfs.^{;}^{, §4.}

Some PG 1159 stars have varying luminosities. These stars vary slightly (5–10%) in brightness due to non-radial gravity wave pulsations within themselves. They vibrate in a number of modes simultaneously, with typical periods between 300 and 3,000 seconds.^{, Table 1.} The first known star of this type is also PG 1159-035, which was found to be variable in 1979, and was given the variable star designation GW Virginis in 1985. These stars are called GW Vir stars, after their prototype, or the class may be split into DOV and PNNV stars.^{, § 1.1;}

== See also ==
- Extreme helium star
- Planetary nebula
- White dwarf
