= SU Ursae Majoris =

Variable star in the constellation Ursa Major

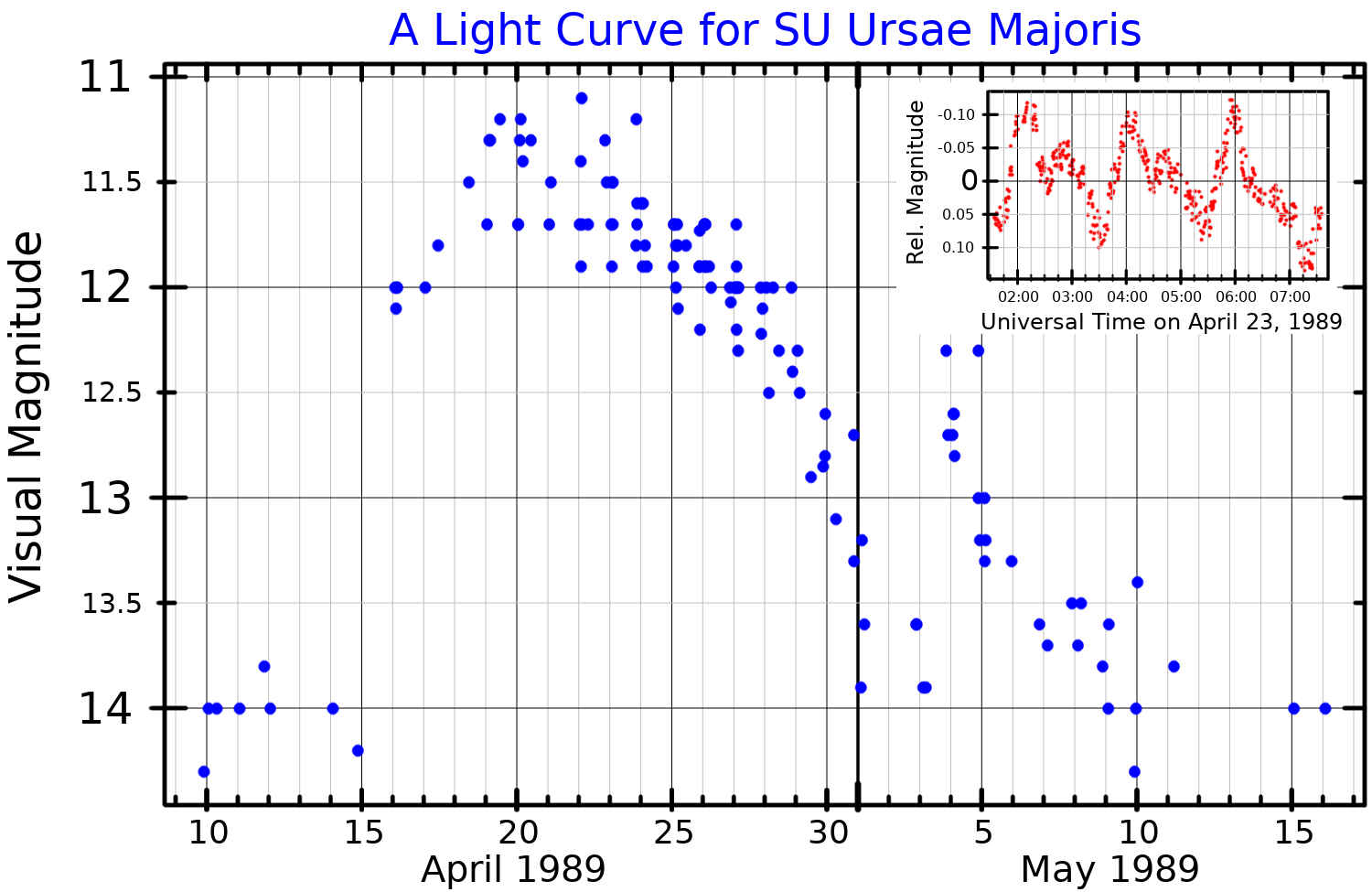
- A visual band light curve for the April 1989 superoutburst of SU Ursae Majoris, adapted from Udalski et al. (1990)

Observation data Epoch J2000 Equinox J2000
- Constellation: Ursa Major
- Right ascension: 08^{h} 12^{m} 28.26946^{s}
- Declination: +62° 36′ 22.4280″
- Apparent magnitude (V): 10.8–14.96

Characteristics
- Evolutionary stage: white dwarf + red dwarf
- Variable type: SU UMa

Astrometry
Radial velocity (R_{v})	+27.0 km/s
Proper motion (μ)	RA: +6.582 mas/yr Dec.: −24.538 mas/yr
Parallax (π)	4.5347±0.0286 mas
Distance	719 ± 5 ly (221 ± 1 pc)
Absolute magnitude (M_{V})	+5.1

Orbit
Period (P)	0.076351±0.000043 d
Inclination (i)	42°
Periastron epoch (T)	2,446,143.6672±0.0015 HJD
Semi-amplitude (K_{1}) (primary)	59±7 km s^{–1} km/s

Details

White dwarf
Mass	0.8 M_{☉}
Temperature	28,000 K

Red dwarf
Mass	0.105 M_{☉}
Radius	0.167 R_{☉}

Other designations
- AAVSO 0803+62, SU UMa, 2MASS J08122826+6236224

Database references
SIMBAD	data

SU Ursae Majoris, or SU UMa, is a close binary star in the northern circumpolar constellation of Ursa Major. It is a periodic cataclysmic variable that varies in magnitude from a peak of 10.8 down to a base of 14.96. The distance to this system, as determined from its annual parallax shift of 4.53 mas, is 719 light-years. It is moving further from the Earth with a heliocentric radial velocity of +27 km/s.

The variable nature of this star was discovered at the Moscow Observatory by Lidiya Tseraskaya (L. Ceraski) in 1908. It was classified as a U Geminorum-type variable, or dwarf nova. Observation since 1926 showed that this variable undergoes two different types of eruptions: a short maxima lasting around two days that ranged in brightness between 11.6–12.9 magnitude, and a longer maxima extending for 13 days that ranged between 10.4–11.8 magnitude. The later event came to be referred to as 'supermaxima' or 'superoutbursts'. Similar dwarf novae of this class have since been discovered, and SU UMa is now the prototype for this sub-category of variable stars.

This is a single-lined spectroscopic binary with an orbital period of 1.83 hours. It consists of a white dwarf star that is acquiring matter from its close companion via an accretion disk. This disk is unstable and undergoes periodic outbursts which increase the luminosity of the system. For SU UMa, the accretion rate from the companion is 9.8×10^{−13} M_{☉}·yr^{−1}. X-ray emission has been detected in the vicinity of the white dwarf, which drops by a factor of four during outbursts. This emission is theorized to come from the boundary layer between the white dwarf and its accretion disk.

== See also ==
- Superhump
