= Ross 548 =

Variable star in the constellation Cetus

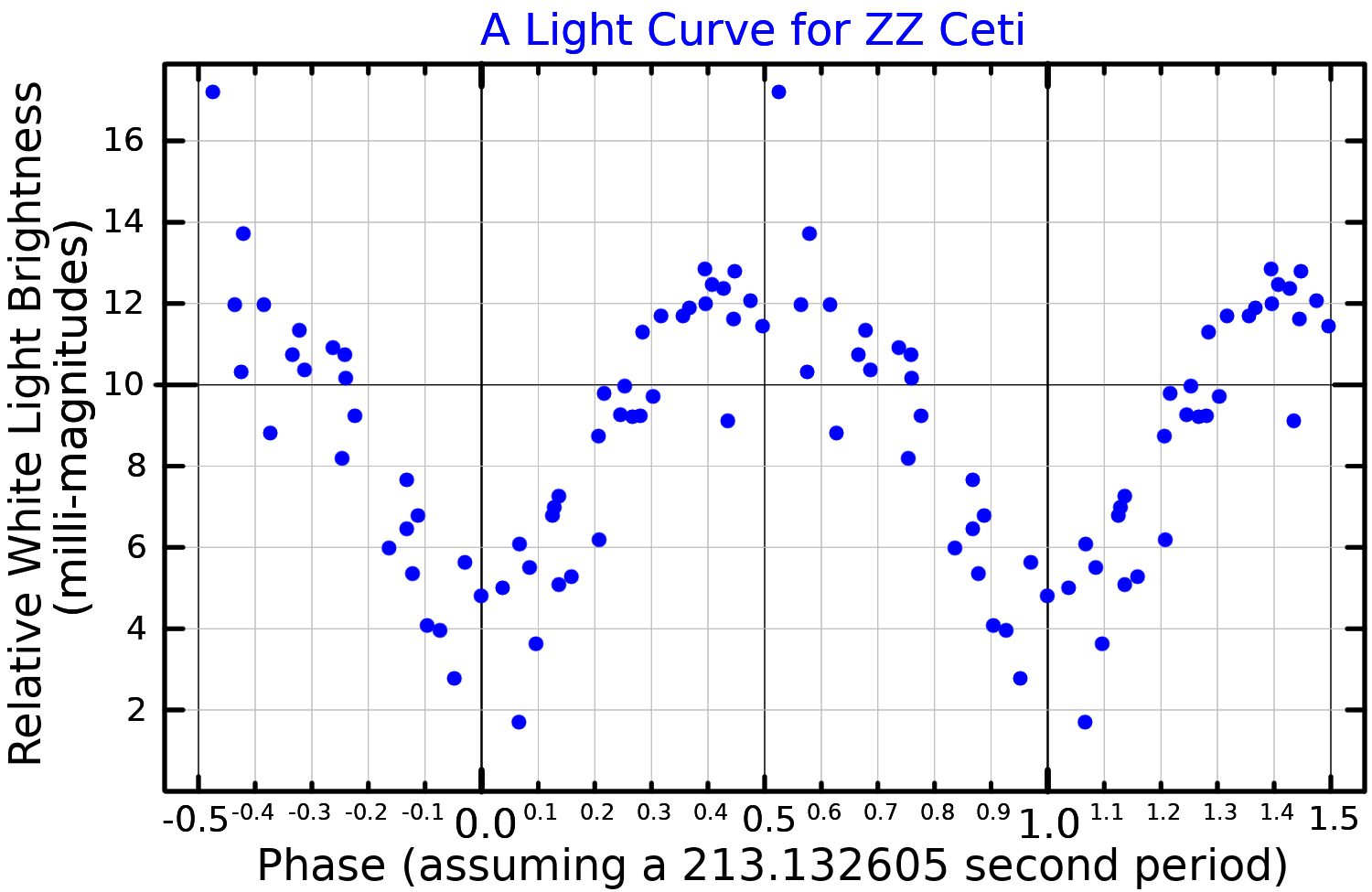
- A light curve for ZZ Ceti, adapted from Stover et al. (1980)

Observation data Epoch J2000.0 Equinox ICRS
- Constellation: Cetus
- Right ascension: 01^{h} 36^{m} 13.61558^{s}
- Declination: −11° 20′ 32.6318″
- Apparent magnitude (V): 14.16±0.01

Characteristics
- Evolutionary stage: White dwarf
- Spectral type: DA4.0
- U−B color index: −0.5
- B−V color index: 0.2
- Variable type: ZZ Cet (DAV)

Astrometry
Proper motion (μ)	RA: +460.845 mas/yr Dec.: −116.448 mas/yr
Parallax (π)	30.5249±0.0546 mas
Distance	106.8 ± 0.2 ly (32.76 ± 0.06 pc)
Absolute magnitude (M_{V})	11.78±0.06

Details
Mass	0.65±0.02 M_{☉}
Radius	0.0118±0.0002 R_{☉}
Luminosity	0.0029±0.0002 L_{☉}
Surface gravity (log g)	8.108±0.025 cgs
Temperature	12,281±125 K
Rotation	37.84±1.99 h

Other designations
- ZZ Cet, EGGR 10, G 271-106, G 272-52, LTT 873, NLTT 5358, WD 0133-116

Database references
SIMBAD	data

Ross 548 is a white dwarf in the equatorial constellation of Cetus. With a mean apparent visual magnitude of 14.2 it is much too faint to be visible to the naked eye. Based on parallax measurements, it is located at a distance of 107 light years from the Sun. It was found to be variable in 1970 and in 1972 it was given the variable star designation ZZ Ceti. This is a pulsating white dwarf of the DAV type that is the prototype of the ZZ Ceti variable class.^{, pp. 891, 895.}

This DA-class white dwarf is the surviving core of a red giant star that ceased nuclear fusion while shedding its outer envelope. It has a (presumably) homogeneous core of carbon and oxygen, a relatively thin outer envelope of hydrogen, and a helium mantle. The object has 65% of the mass of the Sun, with 1.2% of the Sun's radius. It is radiating 0.3% of the luminosity of the Sun at an effective temperature of 12,281 K. Ross 548 is spinning with a period of ~38 hours. The dominant pulsation mode of this object has a period of 213.1326 seconds. It has up to 11 known pulsation modes in total.
