= Sunquest sundial =

Sundial designed by Richard L. Schmoyer

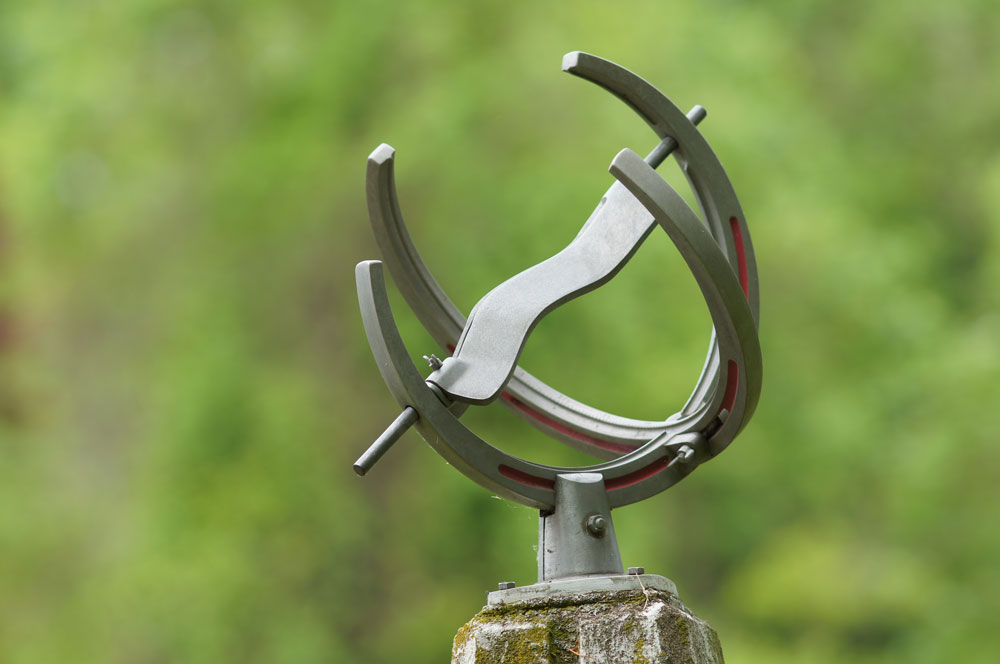
Sunquest sundial, designed by Richard L. Schmoyer, at the Mount Cuba Observatory in Greenville, Delaware

The Sunquest Sundial is a sundial designed by Richard L. Schmoyer in the 1950s. Adjustable for latitude and longitude, the Sunquest's gnomon automatically corrects for the equation of time allowing it to tell clock time.

The Sunquest sundial utilizes a cast aluminum gnomon, the shape of which is related to the analemma. When turned to face the sun, the gnomon casts a curved ribbon of sunlight onto the time-scale arc, correcting for mean time. The Sunquest sundial won Sky & Telescope magazine's "Sundial of the Year 2000" competition in 1966.

The Sunquest Sundial has been featured in several other publications, including Sundials: The Art and Science of Gnomonics, Scientific American and Sundials: Their Theory and Construction.
