= HL Tau 76 =

Star in the constellation Taurus

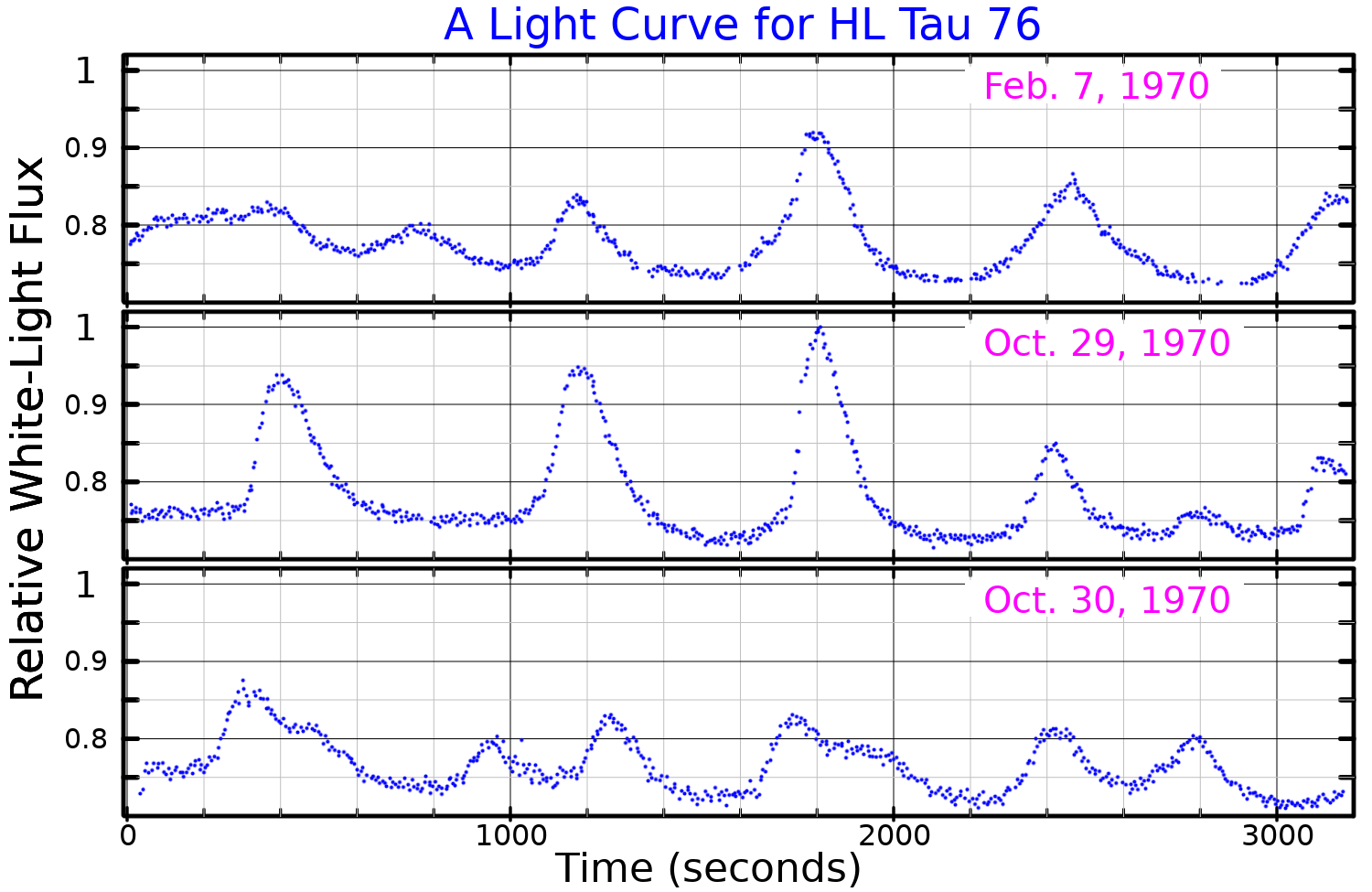
- A white-light light curve light curve for HL Tau 76, adapted from Warner and Nather (1972)

Observation data Epoch J2000.0 Equinox ICRS
- Constellation: Taurus
- Right ascension: 04^{h} 18^{m} 56.638^{s}
- Declination: +27° 17′ 48.31″
- Apparent magnitude (V): 14.1–15.28

Characteristics
- Evolutionary stage: white dwarf
- Spectral type: DA4.3
- B−V color index: 0.2
- Variable type: DAV (ZZ Ceti)

Astrometry
Proper motion (μ)	RA: 62.600 mas/yr Dec.: −72.819 mas/yr
Parallax (π)	20.7244±0.0338 mas
Distance	157.4 ± 0.3 ly (48.25 ± 0.08 pc)
Absolute magnitude (M_{V})	11.69

Details
Mass	0.575±0.005 M_{☉}
Radius	0.0162 R_{☉}
Luminosity	0.00389 L_{☉}
Surface gravity (log g)	7.8 cgs
Temperature	11,375±30 K

Other designations
- EGGR 265, V411 Tau, WD 0416+272

Database references
SIMBAD	data

HL Tau 76 is a variable white dwarf star of the DAV (or ZZ Ceti) type. It was observed by G. Haro and W. J. Luyten in 1961, and was the first variable white dwarf discovered when, in 1968, Arlo U. Landolt found that it varied in brightness with a period of approximately 749.5 seconds, or 12.5 minutes. Like other DAV white dwarfs, its variability arises from non-radial gravity wave pulsations within itself.^{, § 7.} Later observation and analysis has found HL Tau 76 to pulsate in over 40 independent vibrational modes, with periods between 380 seconds and 1390 seconds.

The designation HL Tau 76 derives from the discovery of this star as a white dwarf, when it was described as Taurus no.76 in a publication authored by Guillermo Haro and Willem Jacob Luyten. The exact designation HL Tau 76 was then used in subsequent papers, including one giving the star its designation EGGR 265 where it was noted to be variable. It was then included in the 57th name-list of variable stars and given the variable star designation V441 Tauri. The unusual designation HL Tau 76 continues to be used by most authors.
