= Helium star =

Blue star with strong helium lines

A helium star is a class O or B star (blue), which has extraordinarily strong helium lines and weaker than normal hydrogen lines, indicating strong stellar winds and a mass loss of the outer envelope. Extreme helium stars (EHe) entirely lack hydrogen in their spectra. Pure helium stars lie on or near a helium main sequence, analogous to the main sequence formed by the more common hydrogen stars.

== Terminology ==
Previously, a helium star was a synonym for a B-type star, but this use of for the term is considered obsolete.

A helium star is also a term for a hypothetical star that could occur if two helium white dwarfs with a combined mass of at least 0.5 solar masses merge and subsequently start nuclear fusion of helium, with a lifetime of a few hundred million years. This may only happen if these two binary masses share the same type of envelope phase. It is believed this is the origin of the extreme helium stars.

== Description ==
The helium main sequence is a line in the HR diagram where unevolved helium stars lie. It lies mostly parallel and to the left (i.e. higher temperatures) of the better-known hydrogen main sequence, although at high masses and luminosities it bends to the right and even crosses the hydrogen main sequence. Therefore, pure helium stars have a maximum temperature, between about 100,000 K and 150,000 K depending on metallicity, because high luminosity causes dramatic inflation of the stellar envelope.

Helium stars' great capability of transforming into other stellar objects has been observed over recent years since they were first identified. The blue progenitor system of the supernova type Iax SN 2012Z in the spiral galaxy NGC 1309 is similar to the progenitor of the Galactic helium nova V445 Puppis, suggesting that SN 2012Z was the explosion of a white dwarf accreting from a helium-star companion. It is observed to have caused a growing helium star that has the potential to transform into a red giant after losing its hydrogen envelope in the future.

== See also ==
- Carbon star
- R Coronae Borealis variable
