= AM Canum Venaticorum =

Star in the constellation Canes Venatici

Observation data Epoch J2000.0 Equinox J2000.0 (ICRS)
- Constellation: Canes Venatici
- Right ascension: 12^{h} 34^{m} 54.60^{s}
- Declination: +37° 37′ 44.1″
- Apparent magnitude (V): 13.7–14.2

Characteristics
- Spectral type: DBp
- U−B color index: −1.01
- B−V color index: −0.23
- Variable type: AM CVn

Astrometry
Proper motion (μ)	RA: 30.935 mas/yr Dec.: 12.420 mas/yr
Parallax (π)	3.3512±0.0452 mas
Distance	970 ± 10 ly (298 ± 4 pc)
Absolute magnitude (M_{V})	4.90+0.37 −0.45

Orbit
Period (P)	1,028.7322±0.0003 s (17:08.732±0.018 min)
Inclination (i)	43±2°

Details

WD
Mass	0.6 M_{☉}
Radius	0.0137 R_{☉}
Temperature	100,000 K

donor
Mass	0.1 M_{☉}

Other designations
- EGGR 91, HZ 29, GSC 03018-02523, PG 1232+379, WD 1232+37, AAVSO 1229+38.

Database references
SIMBAD	data

AM Canum Venaticorum (AM CVn) is a hydrogen-deficient cataclysmic variable binary star in the constellation of Canes Venatici. It is the type star of its class of variables, the AM Canum Venaticorum stars. The system consists of a white dwarf gaining matter via an accretion disk from a semi-degenerate or white dwarf companion.

== Observations ==
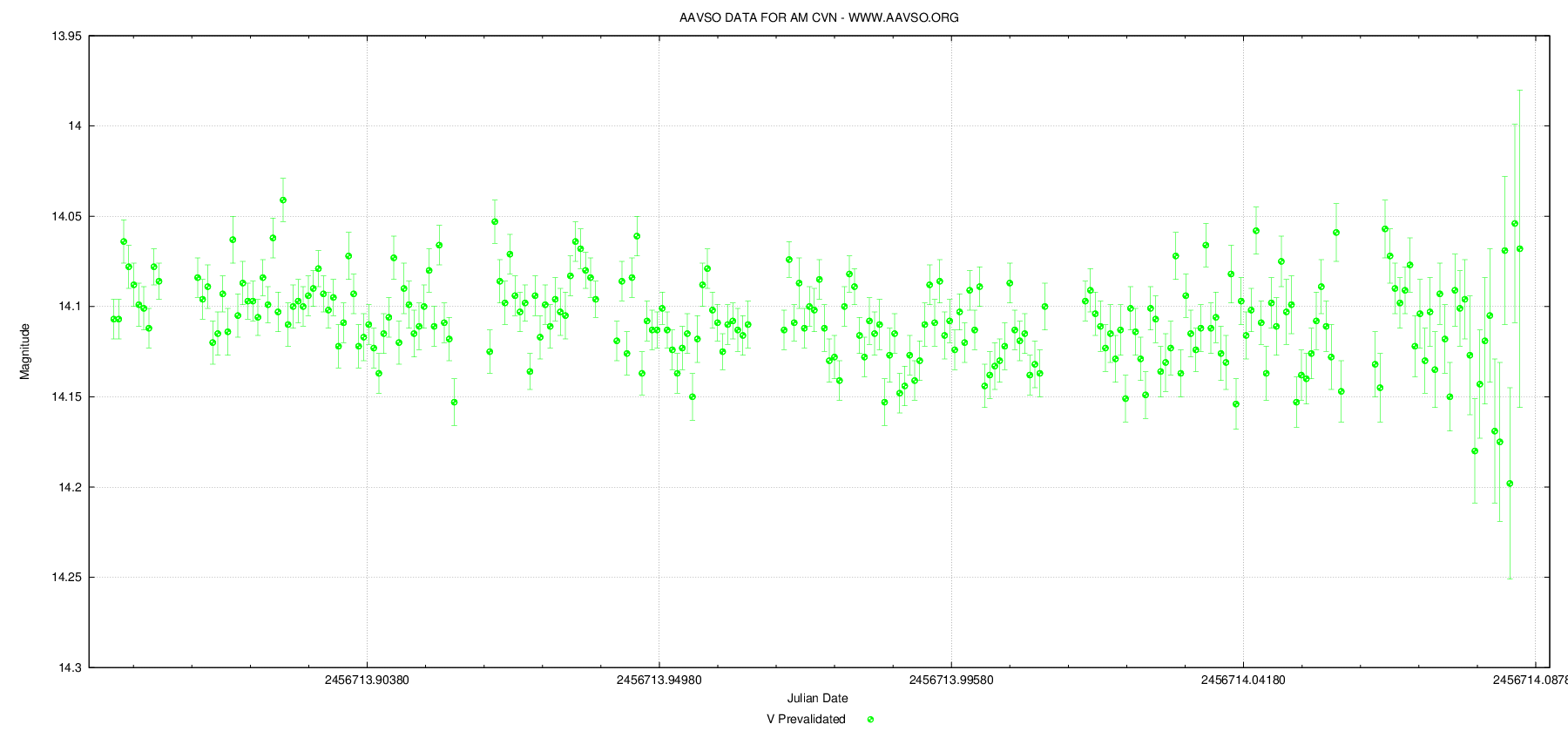
Photoelectric V light curve for AM Canum Venaticorum over a 330-minute period

During 1939–40, a survey for faint white dwarfs was carried out using an 18-inch (46 cm) Schmidt telescope at Palomar Observatory. Part of the survey was made around the north galactic pole in order to exclude stars of stellar classifications O, B, and A, as these higher mass, shorter-lived stars tend to be concentrated along the plane of the Milky Way where new star formation occurs. Out of the stars observed, a list of faint blue stars was constructed by Milton L. Humason and Fritz Zwicky in 1947, with their blue hue suggesting a relatively high effective temperature. The 29th star on their list, HZ 29, was found to have the most peculiar spectrum out of the set. It displayed an absence of hydrogen lines, but broad, diffuse lines of neutral (non-ionized) helium. This was interpreted as a hydrogen-deficient white dwarf. In 1962, this star was observed with a photoelectric detector and was found to vary in magnitude over a period of 18 minutes. The light curve of the variation displayed a double sinusoid pattern. Later, a flickering behavior was observed, which suggested a mass transfer.

== Distance ==
The distance of AM CVn has been difficult to determine. It is too faint to have a measured Hipparcos parallax, too distant to have a reliable precise parallax determined by other means, and too rare to have its parameters known by comparison with other objects.

Calibration against other cataclysmic variables yields a distance of 143 pc. Other estimates of its distance, by comparison to models of its accretion disk, give 288±50 pc and 420±80 pc. One ground-based measurement of its absolute parallax gave a distance of 235 pc. Derivation of a relative parallax, by comparison to the estimated parallaxes of three comparison stars, using the Hubble Space Telescope Fine Guidance Sensor gives a very large distance of 606+135
−93 pc.

Gaia Data Release 2 gives a parallax of 3.3512±0.0452 mas, leading to a distance of 295±4 pc. This value gives the system a lower luminosity and accretion rate, closer to what would be expected by accretion disk models.

== Description ==
The model developed to explain the observations was that AM Canum Venaticorum is a binary system consisting of a pair of white dwarfs in a close orbit. The primary is a more massive white dwarf composed of carbon/oxygen, whereas the secondary is a less massive white dwarf made of helium, with no hydrogen but traces of heavier elements. At the unexpectedly large distance found by the HST, the secondary would be a semi-degenerate object such as subdwarf B star.

Gravitational wave radiation is causing a loss of angular momentum in the orbit, leading to the transfer of helium from the secondary to the primary as the two draw closer. This transfer is occurring because the secondary is overflowing its Roche lobe—a tear drop shaped lobe created by the gravitational interaction between the two stars.

The mass transfer rate between the two stars is estimated as about 7×10^{−9} solar masses per year, which is creating an accretion disk around the companion white dwarf. The energy output from the mass flow onto this accretion disk is actually the primary contributor to the visual luminosity of this system; outshining both of the stellar components. The temperature of this disk is about 30,000 K.

High speed photometry of the system shows multiple periods of variation in the luminosity. The main period of 1,028.73 seconds (17^{m} 8.73^{s}) is the orbital period of the pair. A secondary period of 1,051 seconds (17^{m} 31^{s}) is believed to be caused by a superhump—an elevated outburst in the signal that occurs with a period slightly longer than the orbital period. The superhump may be the result of an elongation of the accretion disk in combination with precession. The elliptical disk precesses about the white dwarf over a time interval much longer than the orbital period, causing a slight change in the orientation of the disk over each orbit.

== Flares ==
Normally AM CVn only exhibits magnitude variations of 0.05. However, AM CVn star systems such as this are nova-like objects that are known to randomly generate intense flares in luminosity. AM Canum Venaticorum displayed just such flaring behavior twice during the period 1985–1987, with these flares showing rapid fluctuations in luminosity. A 1986 flare caused an increase in magnitude of up to Δm = 1.07±0.03 and lasted for 212 seconds. The amount of energy released during this event is estimated as 2.7×10^{36} erg. These flashes are caused by the brief thermonuclear fusion of helium being accumulated along an outer shell by the primary.
