= V445 Puppis =

Nova in the constellation Puppis

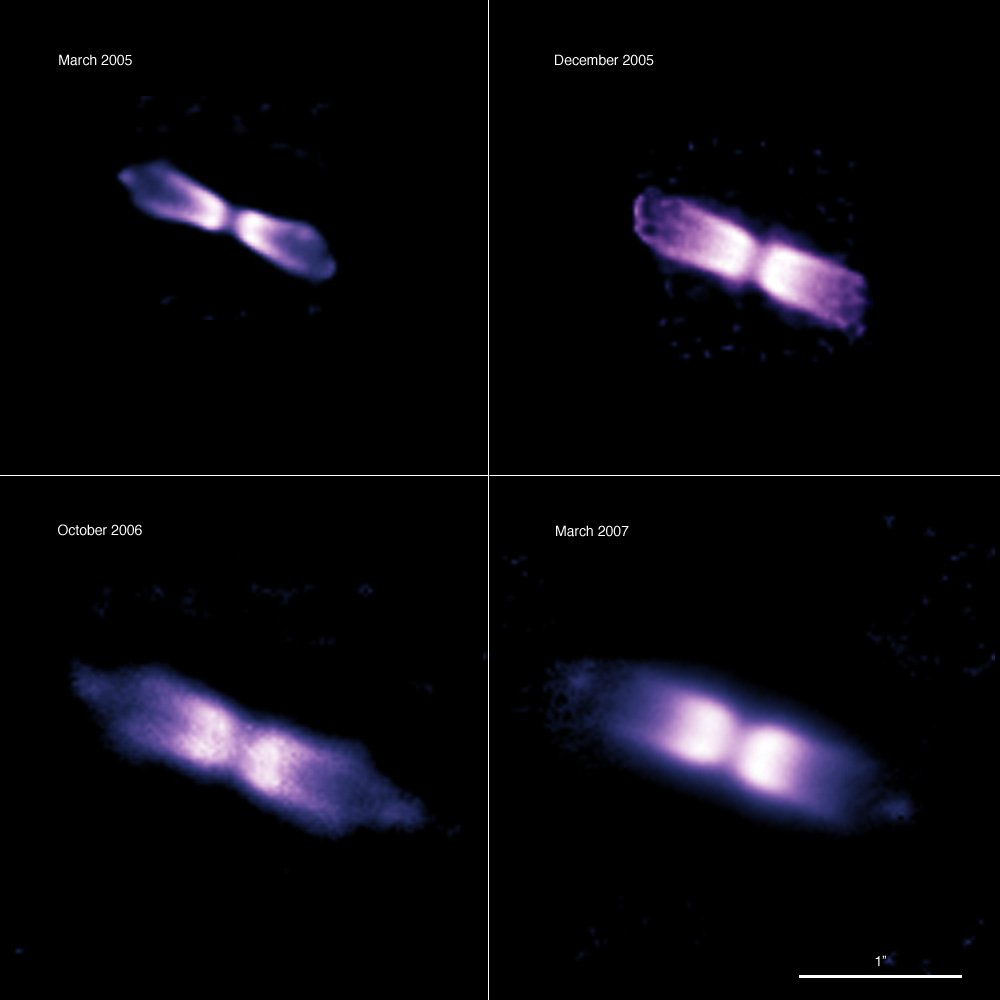
- Expansion of the bipolar shell ejected from V445 Puppis, from 2005 (upper left) to 2007 (lower right); Credit: ESO/P.A. Woudt

Observation data Epoch J2000 Equinox ICRS
- Constellation: Puppis
- Right ascension: 07^{h} 37^{m} 56.90^{s}
- Declination: –25° 56′ 58.9″

Astrometry
Distance	20,460+8,982 −4,064 ly (6,272+2,754 −1,246 pc)

Details

White dwarf
Mass	1.3 M_{☉}

Companion
Mass	0.5 to 1.0 M_{☉}
Radius	2.65±0.35 R_{☉}
Luminosity	10,000^{+ 2,900}_{− 2,200} L_{☉}
Temperature	35,000 K

Other designations
- 2MASS J07375688-2556589, AAVSO 0733-25, Nova Puppis 2000

Database references
SIMBAD	data

V445 Puppis was a nova in the constellation Puppis. It was discovered by Kazuyoshi Kanatsu of Matsue, Shimane, Japan, who recorded a peak magnitude of on December 18, 2000. The nova was reported by Taichi Kato of Kyoto University in the International Astronomical Union circular 7552, issued on December 30, 2000. The location of this nova coincided with a magnitude 13.1 star that had been photographed in 1967. The proper motion of this star was measured as −4.7 mas/yr in right ascension and +6.4 mas/yr in declination, with a standard error of 4 mas/yr.

Examination of the optical spectrum of this nova showed absorption lines of calcium (Ca I), sodium (Na I) and singly ionized iron (Fe II). The initial spectrum was deficient in hydrogen and did not match those typical of other nova types. The infrared spectrum measured on January 31 showed a featureless continuum that decreased with increasing wavelength. This is consistent with emission from heated dust and suggests that the star is a recurrent nova that has generated dust during prior outbursts. By 2004, the object had faded and the dust emission had disappeared.

The deficient level of hydrogen in this outburst, along with an enrichment of helium and carbon, and a higher level of ionization, suggested that it was the first observed instance of a helium nova. This is theorized to occur when a white dwarf star predominantly accretes helium (rather than hydrogen) from an orbiting companion. When sufficient helium has accumulated along a shell on the surface of the white dwarf, a run-away thermonuclear explosion results in a nova outburst. Hence, V445 Puppis may belong to a binary star system and be surrounded by an accretion disk of matter drawn from the companion star.

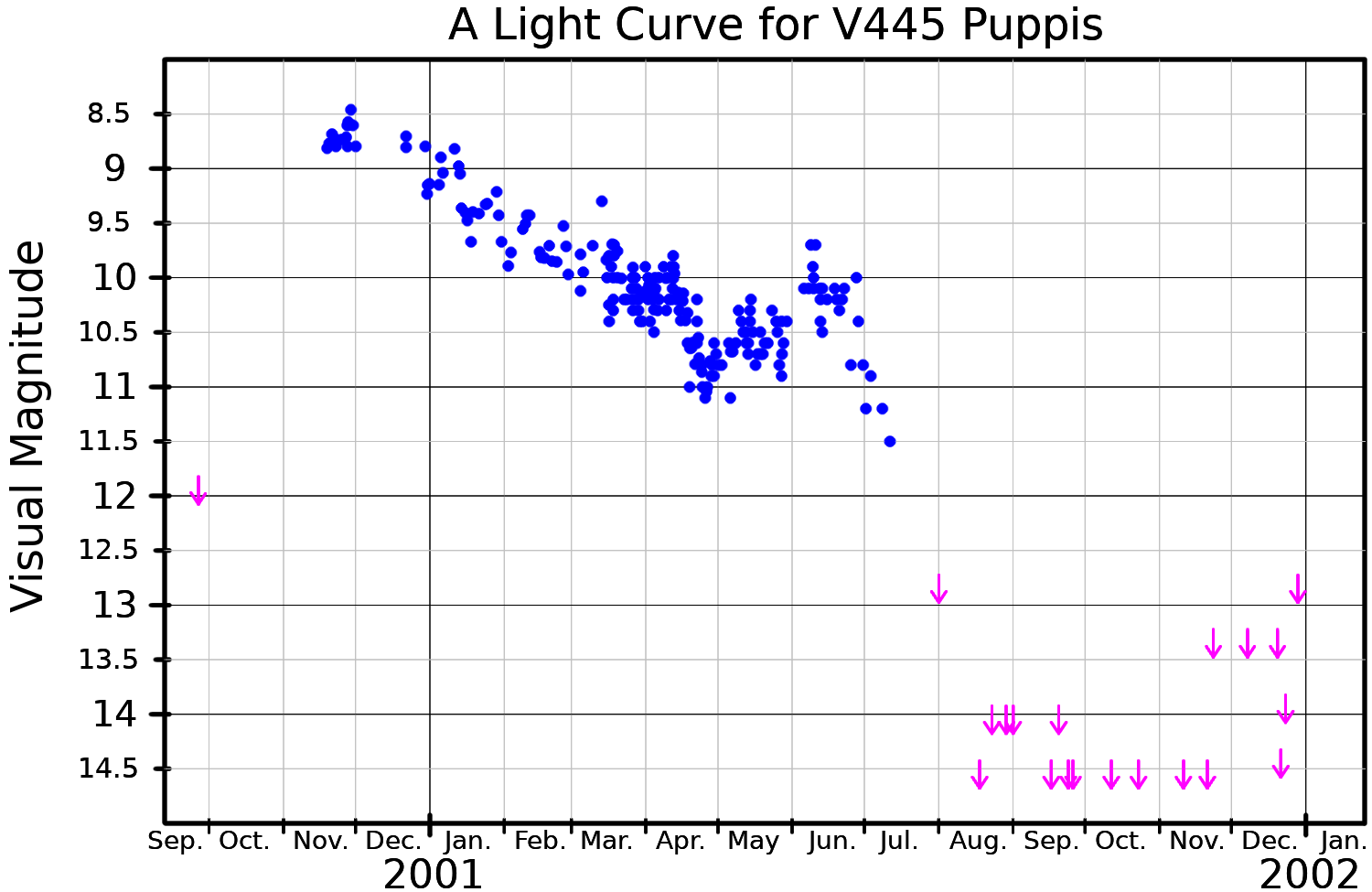
A visual band light curve for V445 Puppis, adapted from Kato et al. (2008). The arrows show upper limits for nondetections.

At present, the system is being obscured by an optically thick cloud of dust. A bi-polar outflow of material has been observed moving away from the system at a velocity of 6,720 ± 650 km s^{−1}. Knots of material within this outflow are moving at velocities of up to 8,450 ± 570 km s^{−1}. Based upon the expansion parallax for this outflow, the system lies at a distance of 8.2 ± 0.5 kpc.

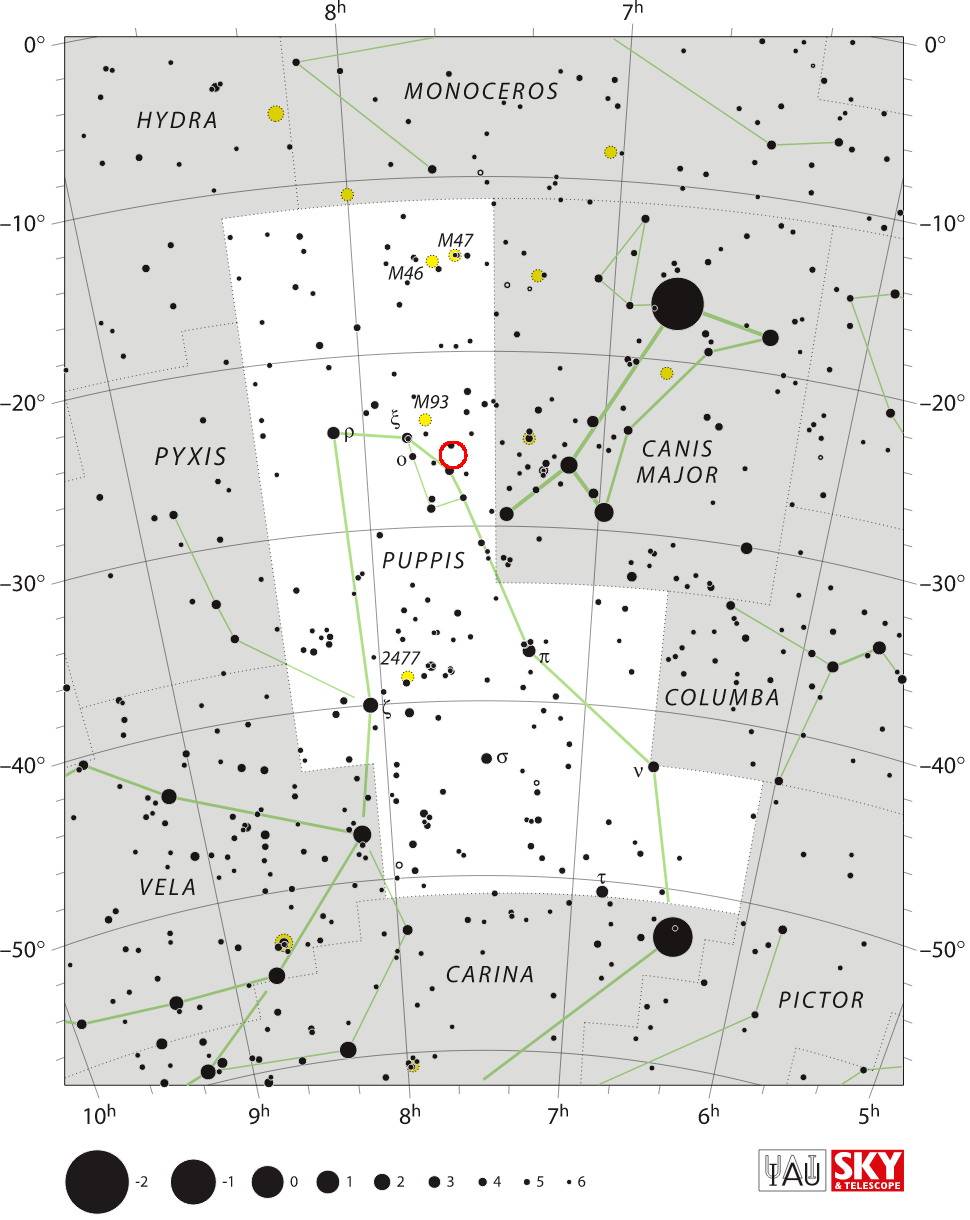
The location of V445 Puppis (circled in red)

The white dwarf in the V445 Puppis system has an estimated mass of more than 1.3 times the mass of the Sun. Previously it was thought the white dwarf is increasing in mass because of recurring helium shell flashes and would explode as Type Ia supernova after it passes Chandrasekhar limit of about 1.38 solar masses, the mass limit of a stable white dwarf. It was later found this white dwarf ejected over 1 Jupiter masses in the 2000 eruption and is losing mass over each eruption cycle, thus ruling out the hypothesis it will explode in a Type Ia supernova.
