= Pulsating white dwarf =

White dwarf whose luminosity is variable

A pulsating white dwarf is a white dwarf star whose luminosity varies due to non-radial gravity wave pulsations within itself. Known types of pulsating white dwarfs include DAV, or ZZ Ceti, stars, with hydrogen-dominated atmospheres and the spectral type DA; DBV, or V777 Her, stars, with helium-dominated atmospheres and the spectral type DB; and GW Vir stars, with atmospheres dominated by helium, carbon, and oxygen, and the spectral type PG 1159. (Some authors also include non-PG 1159 stars in the class of GW Vir stars.) GW Vir stars may be subdivided into DOV and PNNV stars; they are not, strictly speaking, white dwarfs but pre-white dwarfs which have not yet reached the white dwarf region on the Hertzsprung–Russell diagram. A subtype of DQV stars, with carbon-dominated atmospheres, has also been proposed, and in May 2012, the first extremely low mass variable (ELMV) white dwarf was reported.

These variables all exhibit small (1%–30%) variations in light output, arising from a superposition of vibrational modes with periods of hundreds to thousands of seconds. Observation of these variations gives asteroseismological evidence about the interiors of white dwarfs.

Types of pulsating white dwarf
DAV (GCVS: ZZA)	DA spectral type, having only hydrogen absorption lines in its spectrum
DBV (GCVS: ZZB)	DB spectral type, having only helium absorption lines in its spectrum
GW Vir (GCVS: ZZO)	Atmosphere mostly C, He and O; may be divided into DOV and PNNV stars
DQV	DQ spectral type; hot, carbon-dominated atmosphere
ELMV	DA spectral type; $\lesssim 0.2 M_{\odot}$

== DAV stars ==
Early calculations suggested that white dwarfs should vary with periods around 10 seconds, but searches in the 1960s failed to observe this. The first variable white dwarf found was HL Tau 76; in 1965 and 1966, Arlo U. Landolt observed it to vary with a period of approximately 12.5 minutes. The reason for this period being longer than predicted is that the variability of HL Tau 76, like that of the other pulsating variable white dwarfs known, arises from non-radial gravity wave pulsations. In 1970, another white dwarf, Ross 548, was found to have the same type of variability as HL Tau 76; in 1972, it was given the variable star designation ZZ Ceti. The name ZZ Ceti also refers to this class of pulsating variable white dwarfs, which, as it consists of white dwarfs with hydrogen atmospheres, is also called DAV. These stars have periods between 30 seconds and 25 minutes and are found in a rather narrow range of effective temperatures between about 12,500 and 11,100 K. The measurement of the rate of change of period with time for the gravity wave pulsations in ZZ Ceti stars is a direct measurement of the cooling timescale for a DA white dwarf, which in turn can give an independent measurement of the age of the galactic disk.

== DBV stars ==
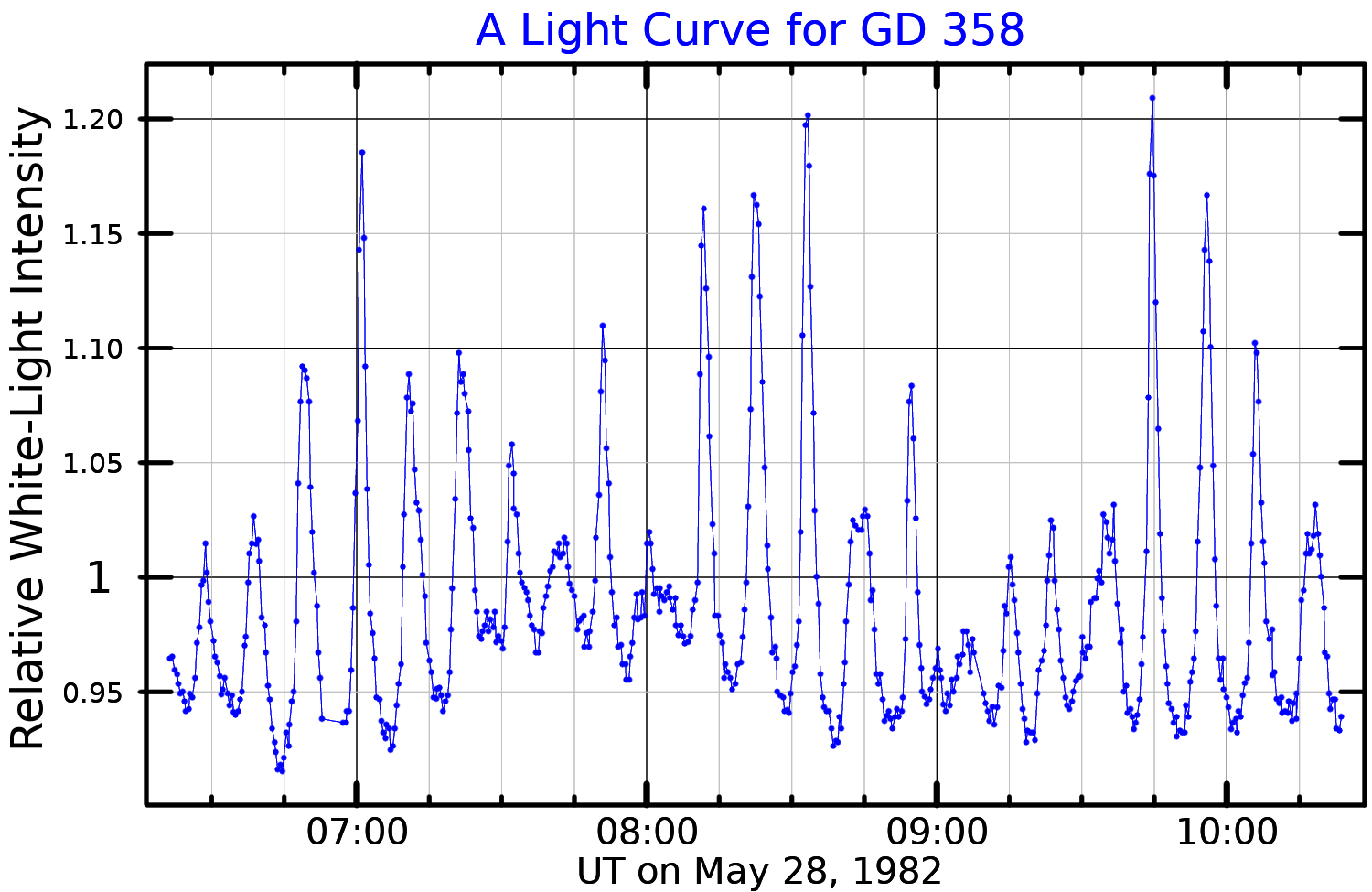
A white-light light curve for GD 358, adapted from Winget et al. (1982)

In 1982, calculations by Don Winget and his coworkers suggested that helium-atmosphere DB white dwarfs with surface temperatures around 19,000 K should also pulsate. Winget then searched for such stars and found that GD 358 was a variable DB, or DBV, white dwarf. This was the first prediction of a class of variable stars before their observation. In 1985, this star was given the designation V777 Her, which is also another name for this class of variable stars. These stars have effective temperatures around 25,000K.

== GW Virginis stars ==
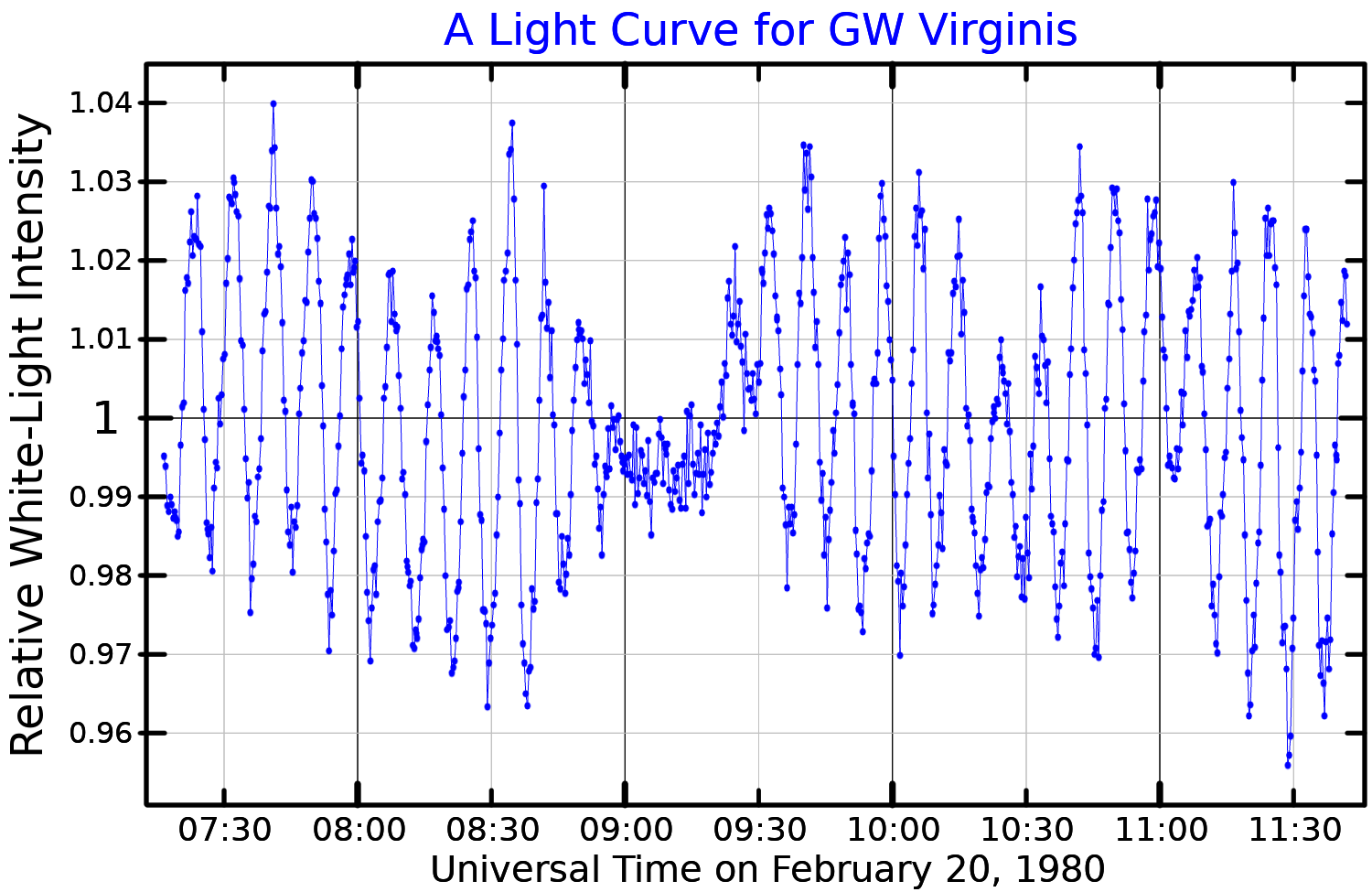
A light curve for GW Virginis, adapted from Winget et al. (1985)

The third known class of pulsating variable white dwarfs is the GW Vir stars, sometimes subdivided into DOV and PNNV stars. Their prototype is PG 1159-035. This star (also the prototype for the class of PG 1159 stars) was observed to vary in 1979, and was given the variable star designation GW Vir in 1985, giving its name to the class. These stars are not, strictly speaking, white dwarfs; rather, they are stars which are in a position on the Hertzsprung–Russell diagram between the asymptotic giant branch and the white dwarf region. They may be called pre-white dwarfs. They are hot, with surface temperatures between 75,000 K and 200,000 K, and have atmospheres dominated by helium, carbon, and oxygen. They may have relatively low surface gravities (log g ≤ 6.5). It is believed that these stars will eventually cool and become DO white dwarfs.

The periods of the vibrational modes of GW Vir stars range from about 300 to about 5,000 seconds. How pulsations are excited in GW Vir stars was first studied in the 1980s but remained puzzling for almost twenty years. From the beginning, the excitation mechanism was thought to be caused by the so-called κ-mechanism associated with ionized carbon and oxygen in the envelope below the photosphere, but it was thought this mechanism would not function if helium was present in the envelope. However, it now appears that instability can exist even in the presence of helium.

== DQV stars ==
A new class of white dwarfs, with spectral type DQ and hot, carbon-dominated atmospheres, has recently been discovered by Patrick Dufour, James Liebert and their coworkers. Theoretically, such white dwarfs should pulsate at temperatures where their atmospheres are partially ionized. Observations made at McDonald Observatory suggest that SDSS J142625.71+575218.3 is such a white dwarf; if so, it would be the first member of a new, DQV, class, of pulsating white dwarfs. However, it is also possible that it is a white dwarf binary system with a carbon-oxygen accretion disk.

== See also ==
- G 117-B15A
- Instability strip
- Stellar pulsation

== External links and further reading ==
- Variable White Dwarf Data Tables, Paul A. Bradley, 22 March 2005 version. Accessed online June 7, 2007.
- A Progress Report on the Empirical Determination of the ZZ Ceti Instability Strip, A. Gianninas, P. Bergeron, and G. Fontaine, arXiv:astro-ph/0612043.
- Asteroseismology of white dwarf stars, D. E. Winget, Journal of Physics: Condensed Matter 10, #49 (December 14, 1998), pp. 11247–11261. DOI 10.1088/0953-8984/10/49/014.
