= List of novae in the Milky Way galaxy =

Artist's conception of a white dwarf, right, accreting hydrogen from the Roche lobe of its larger companion star

A nova is a transient astronomical event that causes the sudden appearance of a bright, apparently "new" star (hence the name "nova", Latin for "new"; the shortened form of "stella nova", Latin for "new star") that slowly fades over weeks or months. All observed novae involve white dwarfs in close binary systems, but causes of the dramatic appearance of a nova vary, depending on the circumstances of the two progenitor stars. The main sub-classes of novae are classical novae, recurrent novae (RNe), and dwarf novae. They are all considered to be cataclysmic variable stars.

This is a partial list of novae in the Milky Way galaxy that have been discovered and recorded since 1891. Novae are stars that undergo dramatic explosions, but unlike supernovae, these do not result in the destruction of the original star. The likely rate of novae in the Milky Way is about 40 per year, but of these only about 10 per year are discovered by observers as of the 2000s (decade). This list attempts to include only the brighter or more notable novae.

The Central Bureau for Astronomical Telegrams (CBAT) maintains a more complete list of novae in the Milky Way since 1612.

For a list of novae in individual years, see instead: novae in 2018, novae in 2019.

== Nomenclature ==
Novae are initially designated via a "Nova [genitive form of constellation name] [year of discovery]" format, e.g. "Nova Cygni 1974" and "Nova Scorpii 2010". An official permanent name is usually soon assigned by the General Catalog of Variable Stars using the GCVS format for the naming of variable stars. When more than one nova is discovered in a constellation in one year, a numeric suffix is appended; hence "Nova Sagittarii 2011 #2", "Nova Sagitarii 2011 #3", etc.

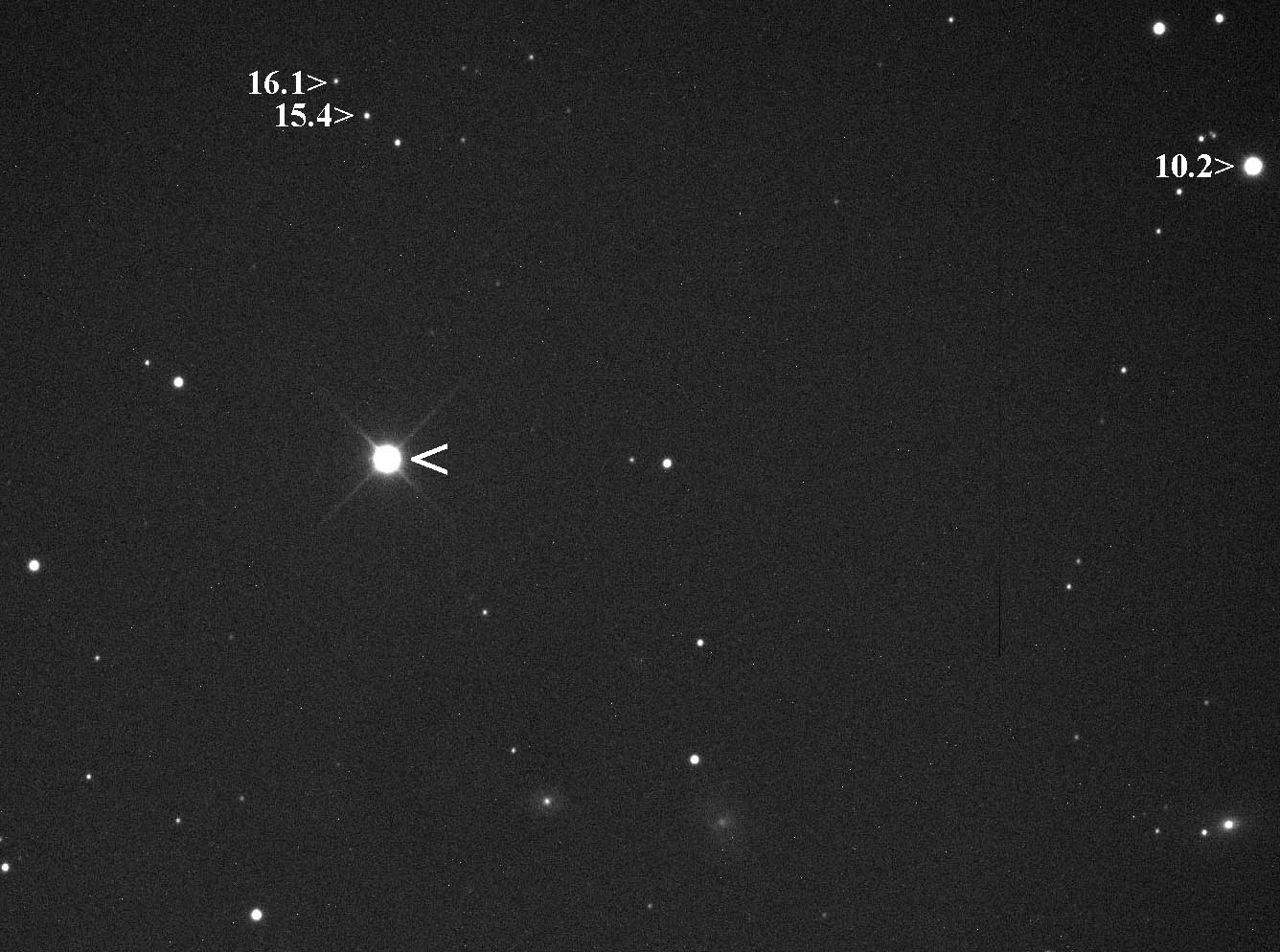
Nova Eridani 2009 (apparent magnitude ~8.4) during a full moon

Year	Nova	Maximum brightness (Note: A higher magnitude means a lower brightness. i.e. T Aurigae (+3.8) was a brighter nova than HR Lyrae (+6.5))
1612	04550 Leonis	+4.0
1670	CK Vulpeculae	+2.6
1673	03846 Puppis	+3.0
1678	V529 Orionis	+6
1783	WY Sagittae	+5.4
1848	V841 Ophiuchi	+2.0
1853	00856 Trianguli	+9.5
1853	SZ Persei	+9.5
1854	SU Arietis	+9.5
1854	U Leonis	+10.5
1860	T Bootis	+9.7
1860	T Scorpii	+7.0
1862	V728 Scorpii	+5.0
1863	U Scorpii	+8.8
1866	T Coronae Borealis	+2.0
1876	Q Cygni	+3.0
1877	AB Boötis	+4.5
1887	V Persei	+4.0
1891	T Aurigae	+3.8
1898	V1059 Sagittarii	+4.5
1899	V606 Aquilae	+5.5
1901	GK Persei	+0.2
1903	DM Geminorum	+4.8
1905	V604 Aquilae	+7.3
1910	OY Arae	+6.0
1910	DI Lacertae	+4.6
1912	DN Geminorum	+3.5
1918	V603 Aquilae	-0.5
1918	GI Monocerotis	+5.6
1919	HR Lyrae	+6.5
1919	V849 Ophiuchi	+7.4
1920	V476 Cygni	+2.0
1920	T Pyxidis	+6.4
1925	RR Pictoris	+1.2
1927	EL Aquilae	+5.5
1927	XX Tauri	+5.9
1933	RS Ophiuchi	+4.3
1934	DQ Herculis	+1.4
1936	CP Lacertae	+2.1
1936	V368 Aquilae	+5.0
1936	V630 Sagittarii	+4.0
1939	BT Monocerotis	+4.5
1942	V450 Cygni	+7.0
1942	CP Puppis	+0.3
1943	V500 Aquilae	+6.1
1944	T Pyxidis	+7.1
1945	V528 Aquilae	+7.0
1946	T Coronae Borealis	+3.0
1948	CT Serpentis	+6.0
1948	V465 Cygni	+7.3
1950	DK Lacertae	+5.0
1956	RW Ursae Minoris	+6.0
1958	RS Ophiuchi	+5.0
1960	V446 Herculis	+2.8
1963	V533 Herculis	+3.0
1964	QZ Aurigae	+6.0
1967	T Pyxidis	+6.7
1967	HR Delphini	+3.7
1967	RS Ophiuchi	+5.0
1968	LV Vulpeculae	+5.2
1970	FH Serpentis	+4.4
1970	V1229 Aquilae	+6.7
1970	V1330 Cygni	+7.5
1971	IV Cephei	+7.0
1975	V1500 Cygni	+1.7
1975	V373 Scuti	+6.0
1976	NQ Vulpeculae	+6.0
1977	HS Sagittae	+7.2
1978	V1668 Cygni	+6.0
1982	V1370 Aquilae	+6.0
1984	PW Vulpeculae	+6.4
1984	QU Vulpeculae	+5.2
1985	RS Ophiuchi	+5.4
1986	V842 Centauri	+4.6
1986	OS Andromedae	+6.3
1987	V827 Herculis	+7.5
1987	QV Vulpeculae	+7.0
1991	V838 Herculis	+5.0
1992	V1974 Cygni	+4.2
1993	V705 Cassiopeiae	+5.8
1999	V382 Velorum	+2.6
1999	V1494 Aquilae	+4.0
2000	V445 Puppis	+8.6
2002	V4743 Sagittarii	+5.0
2006	RS Ophiuchi	+4.5
2007	V1280 Scorpii	+3.9
2009	KT Eridani	+5.5
2013	V339 Delphini	+4.3
2013	V1369 Centauri	+3.3
2015	V5668 Sagittarii	+4.0
2016	V407 Lupi	+5.6
2016	V5856 Sagittarii	+5.5
2018	FM Circini	+5.8
2018	V906 Carinae	+5.9
2018	V392 Persei	+6.2
2019	V3890 Sagittarii	+7.1
2020	YZ Reticuli	+3.7
2021	RS Ophiuchi	+4.6
2021	V1674 Her	+6.0
2021	V1405 Cas	+5.4
2022	V415 Muscae	+8.7
2025	V462 Lupi	+5.7
2025	V572 Velorum	+4.8
2025	V1935 Centauri	+5.8

== See also ==
- List of supernovae
- Variable star
