= V462 Lupi =

Nova that occurred in 2025

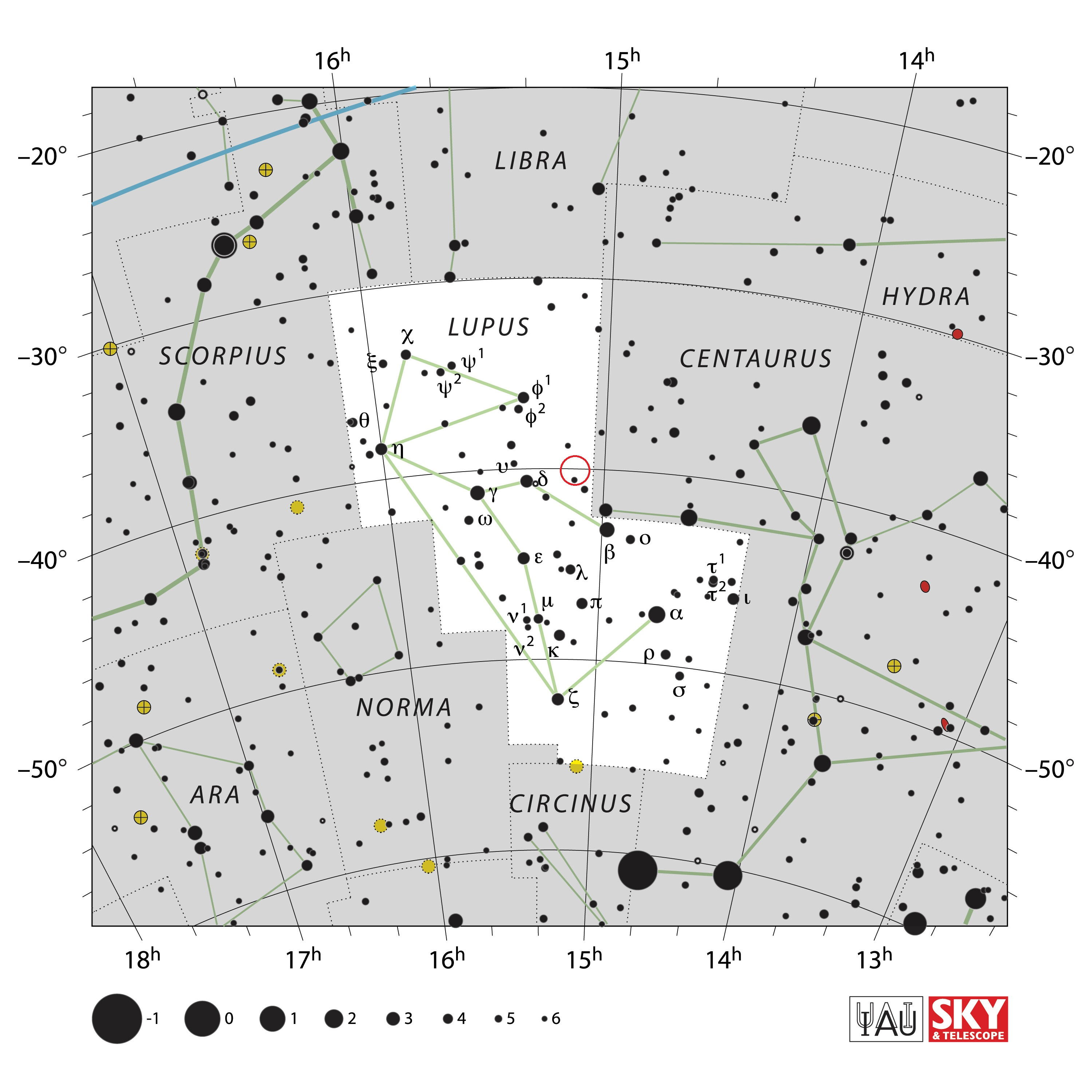
- Approximate location of V462 Lupi (circled in red)

Observation data Epoch J2000.0 Equinox J2000.0 (ICRS)
- Constellation: Lupus
- Right ascension: 15^{h} 08^{m} 03.274^{s}
- Declination: −40° 08′ 29.58″
- Apparent magnitude (V): 5.3 – 18.5

Characteristics
- Variable type: Nova

Other designations
- AT 2025nlr, Nova Lupi 2025, ASASSN-25cm, V462 Lup

V462 Lupi, also known as Nova Lupi 2025, is a bright nova in the constellation Lupus discovered by All Sky Automated Survey for SuperNovae (ASAS-SN) on 12 June 2025. At the time of its discovery, it had an apparent visual magnitude of 8.7. It was classified as a classical nova on 14 June 2025.

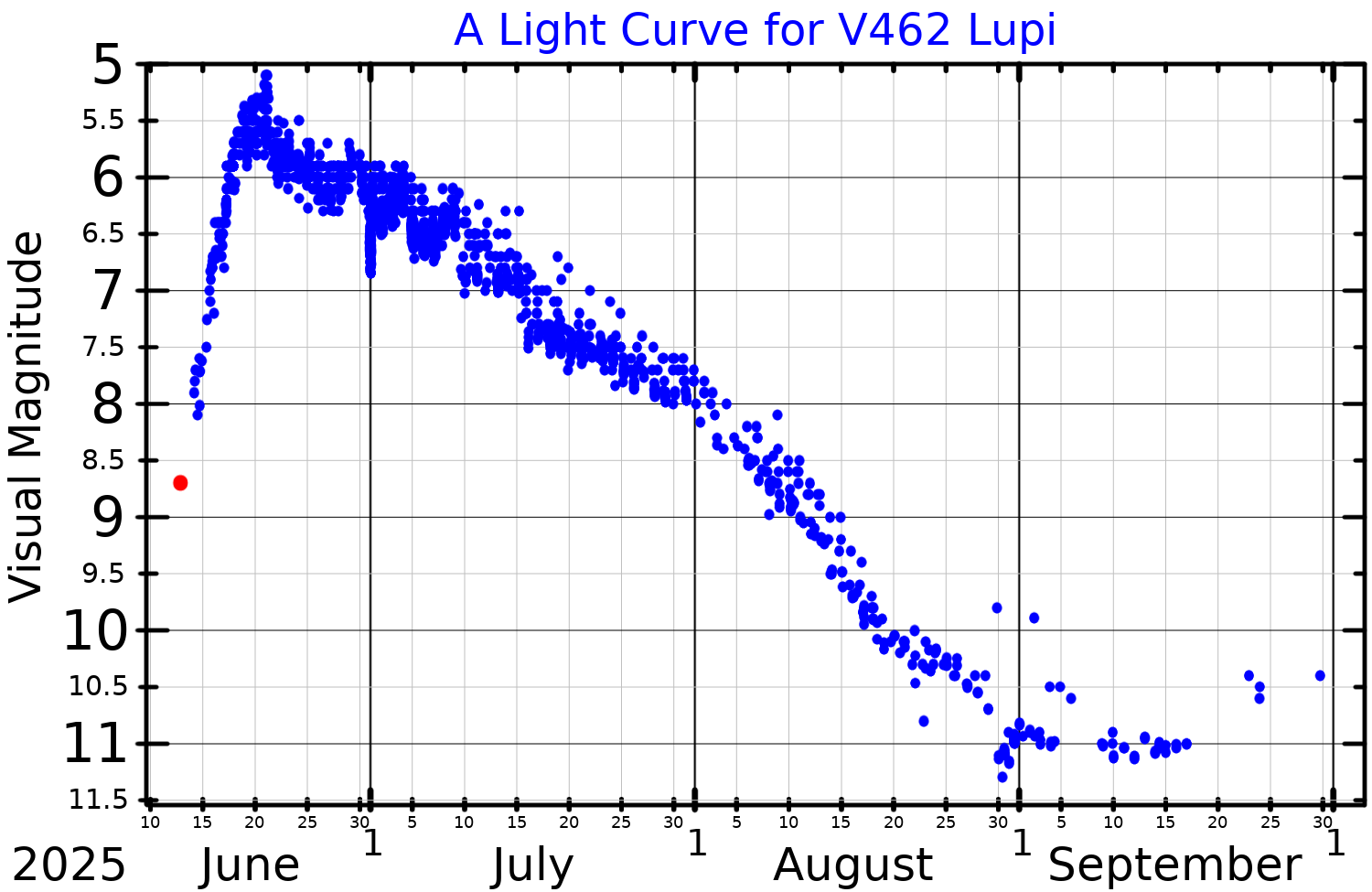
A visual band light curve for V462 Lupi, plotted from AAVSO and ASAS-SN data (red point)

By 18 June 2025, it had brightened to magnitude 5.7, making it just visible to the naked eye. The peak brightness, magnitude 5.5, was reached on 20 June 2025, and around 10 July 2025 it became too faint to see with the naked eye even under ideal conditions.

All novae are binary stars, with matter from a "donor" star accreting onto a white dwarf. In the case of V462 Lupi, the orbital period is 0.07488825±0.00000016 days (1.80 h).

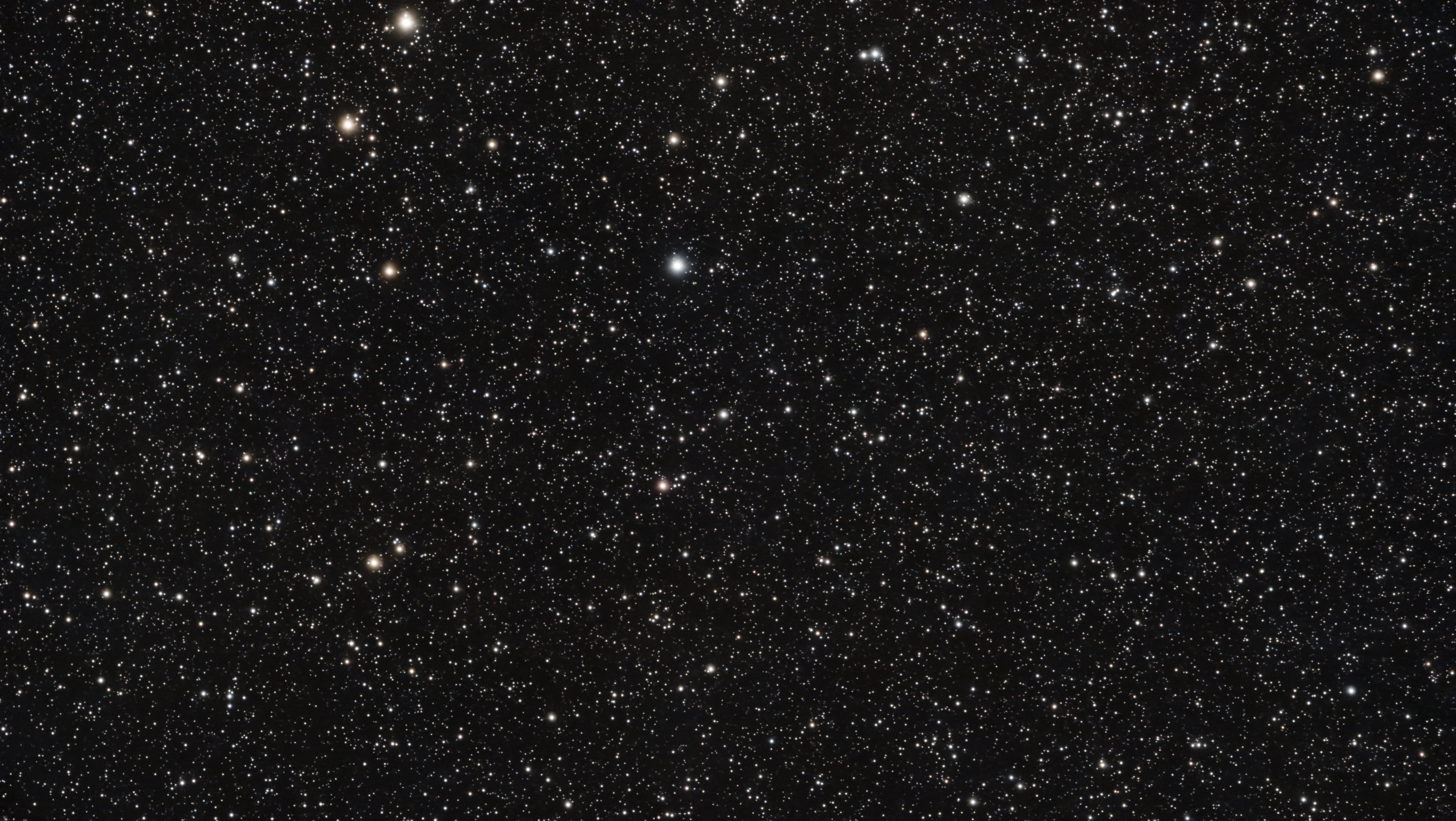
An image of Nova V462 Lupi, captured by the Dwarf 3 telescope in Sydney on August 6, 2025, shows that its luminosity had decayed considerably after five weeks.

== Image gallery ==
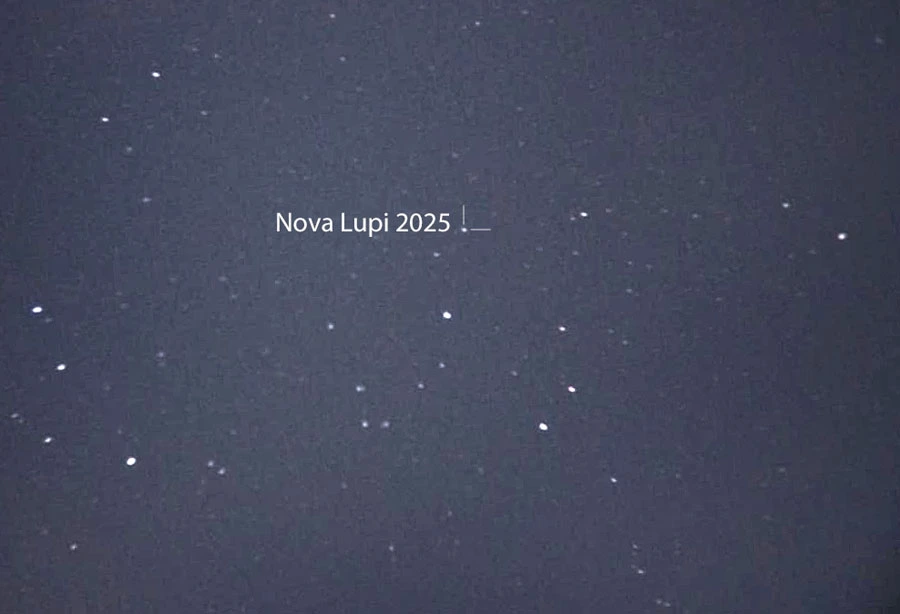
Photograph of V462 Lupi

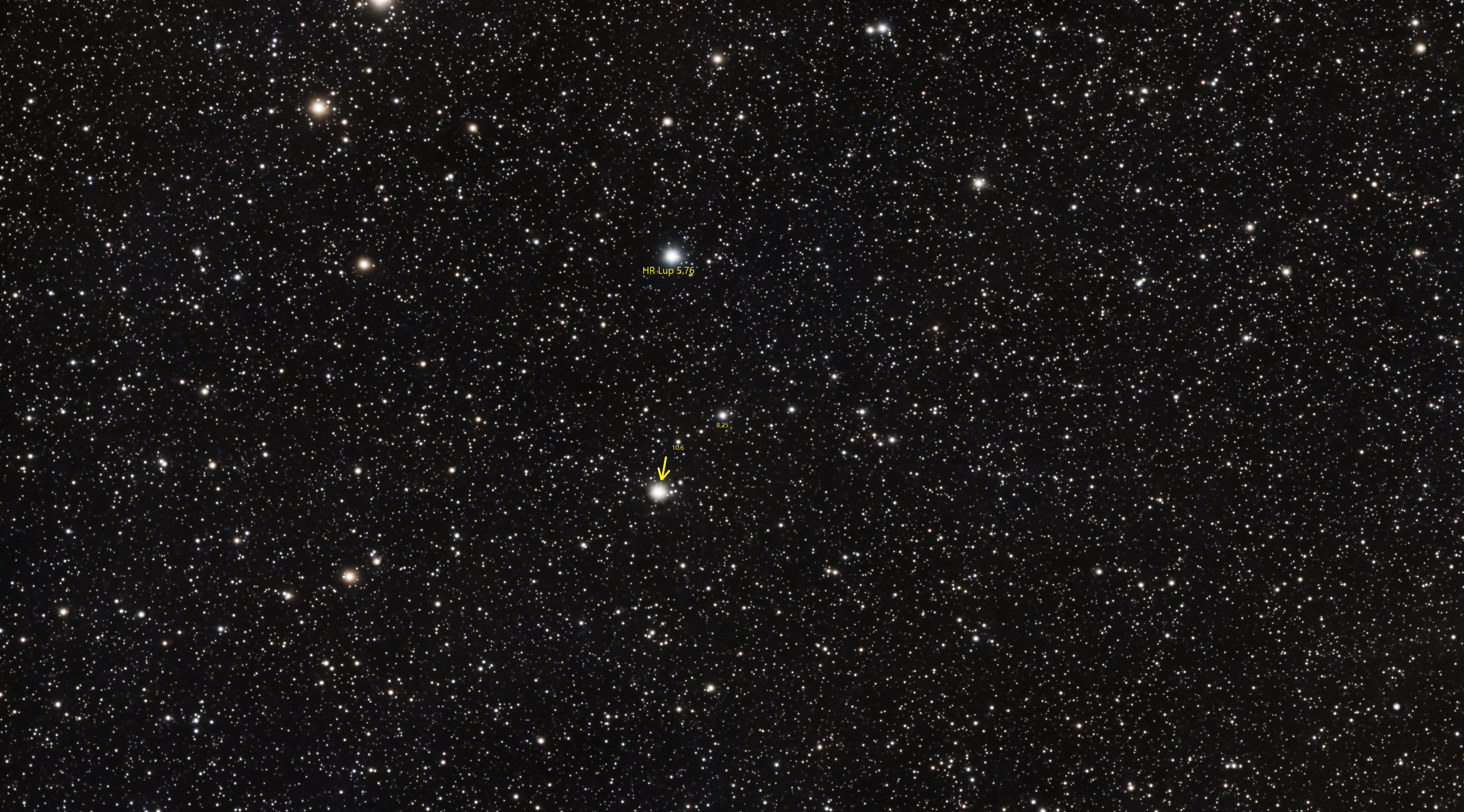
V462 Lupi – Observed using the Dwarf 3 smart telescope in Sydney on 29-Jun-2025, with brightness comparable to HR Lupi.

== See also ==
- List of novae in the Milky Way galaxy
- Supernova
