= V1935 Centauri =

Nova that occurred in 2025

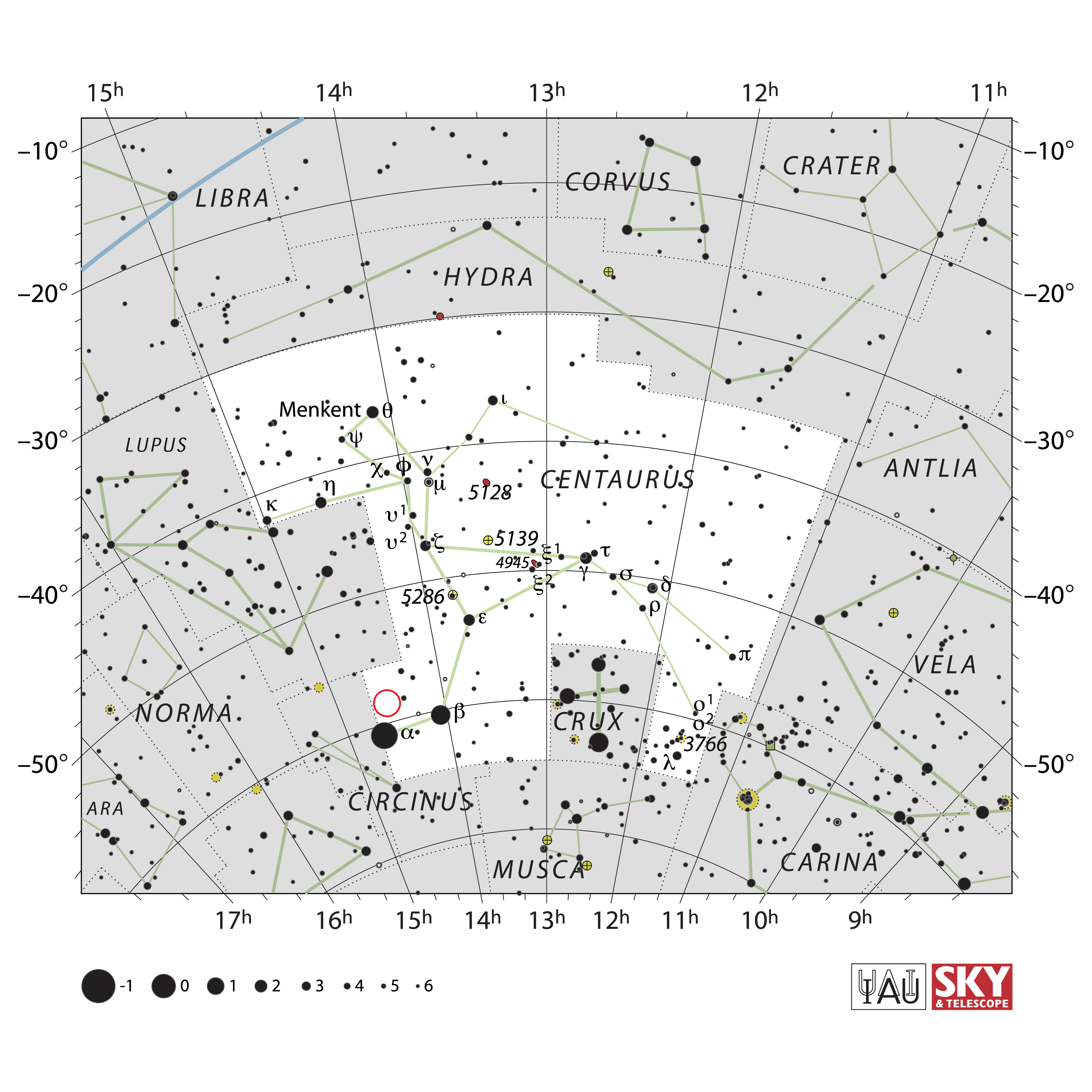
- Approximate location of V1935 Centauri circled in red

Observation data Epoch J2000.0 Equinox J2000.0 (ICRS)
- Constellation: Centaurus
- Right ascension: 14^{h} 37^{m} 21.77^{s}
- Declination: −58° 47′ 40.0″
- Apparent magnitude (V): 6.2 (at discovery)

Characteristics
- Variable type: Nova

Other designations
- Nova Centauri 2025, PNV J14372177-5847400, V1935 Cen

V1935 Centauri, also known as Nova Centauri 2025, is a bright nova in the constellation Centaurus discovered by John Seach on 22 September 2025. At the time of its discovery, it had an apparent visual magnitude of 6.2, which is just invisible to the naked eye.

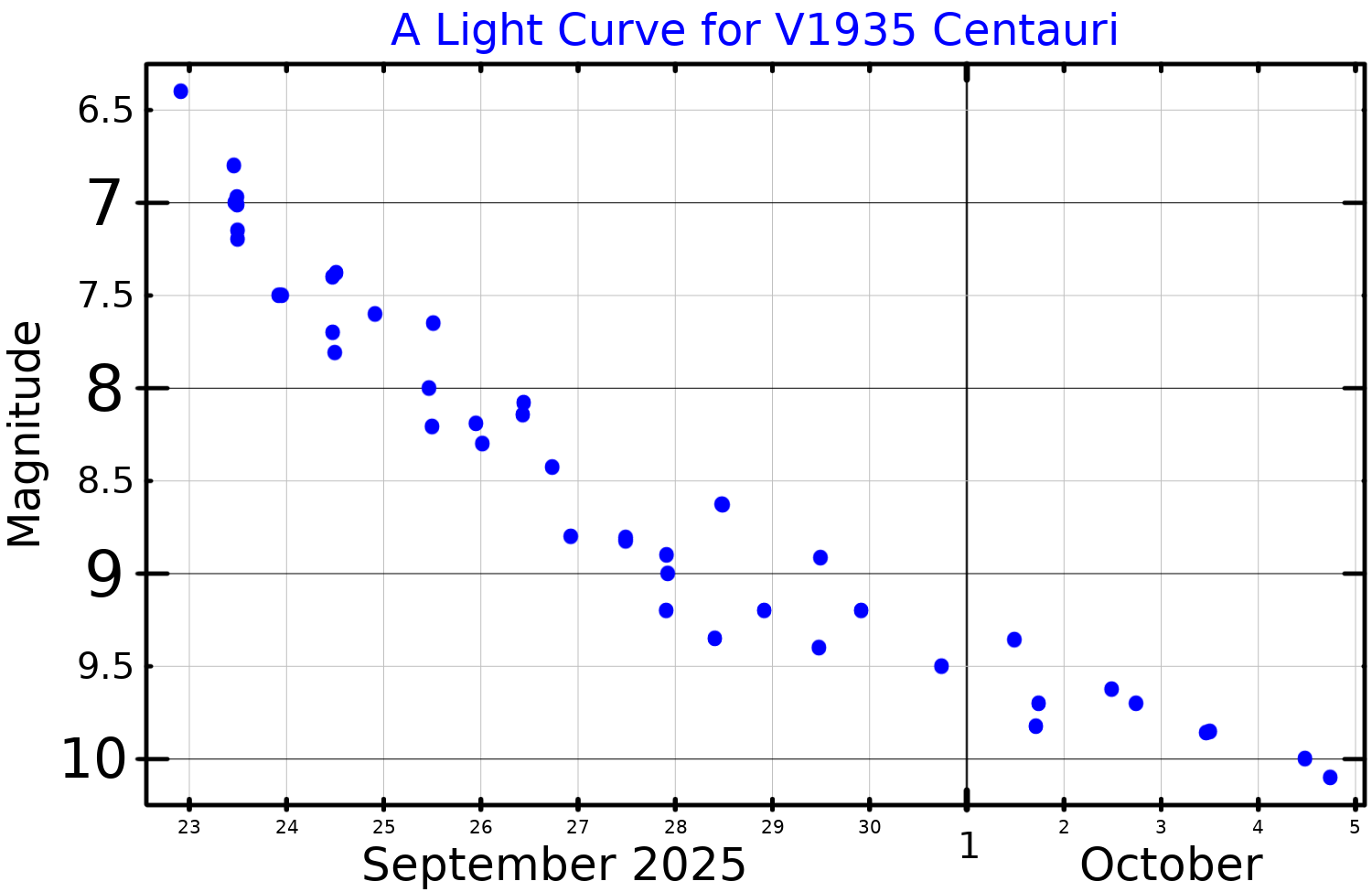
A visual and green band light curve for V1935 Centauri, plotted from AAVSO data

Fermi detected gamma-rays prior to the discovery at the September 21.50-21.75 bin. Swift observed the Nova on 2025-09-23.64 and detected a bright source of hard x-rays at the position of the nova. The early detection might indicate a symbiotic nature of the host binary system. Alternatively the nova may be unusually fast in clearing up its ejecta.

== Image gallery ==
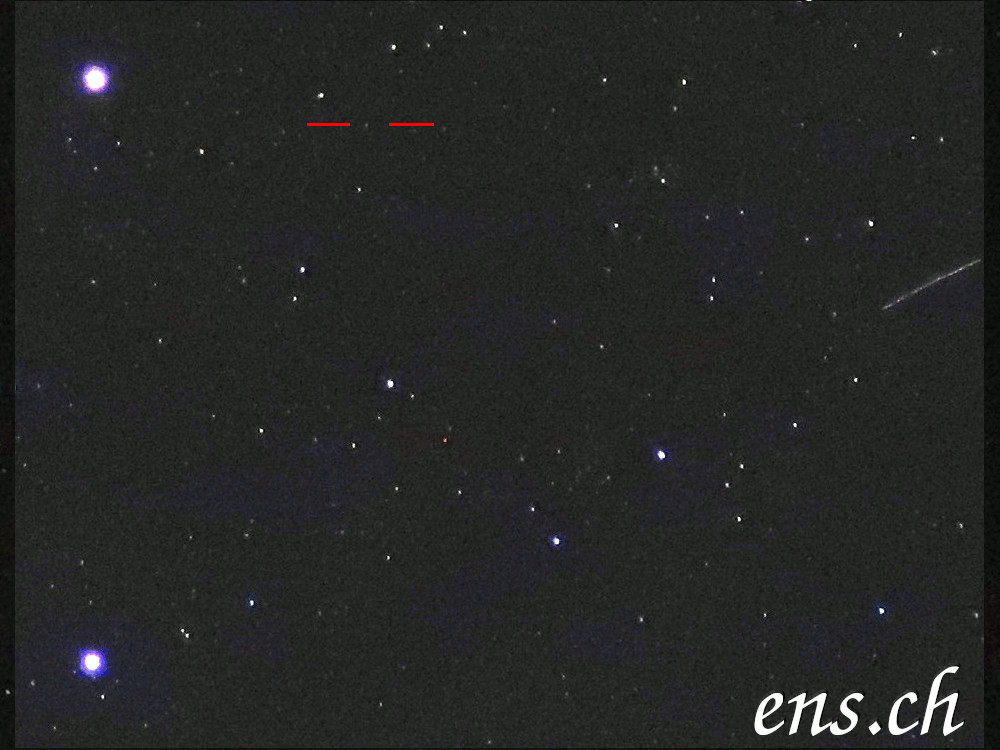
Nova V1935 Centauri / Nova Centauri 2025 / PNV J14372177-5847400

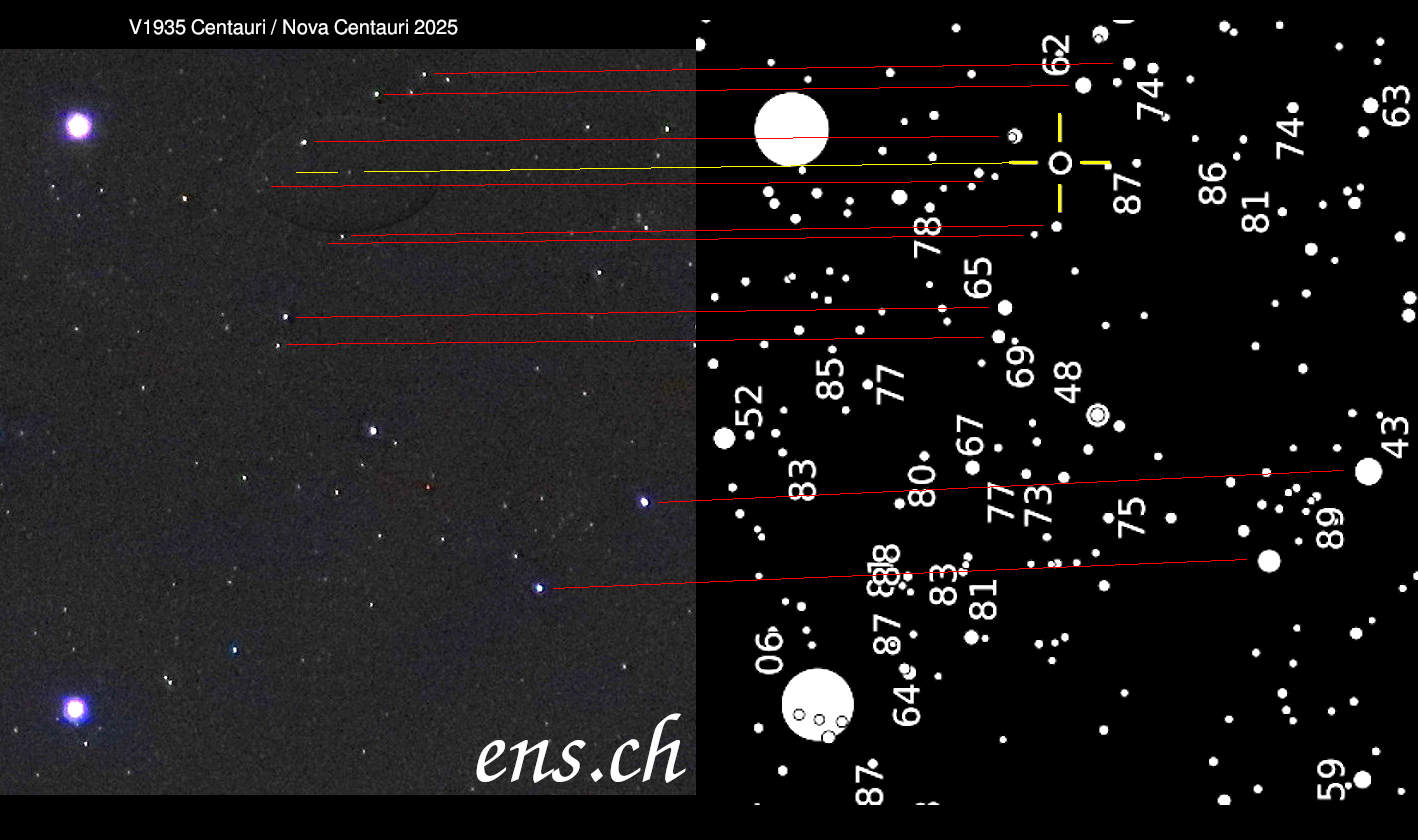
Nova V1935 Centauri / Nova Centauri 2025 / PNV J14372177-5847400

20. September vs 26. September 2025 : Nova V1935 Centauri

== See also ==
- List of novae in the Milky Way galaxy
- Supernova
