= OS Andromedae =

Nova event seen in 1986

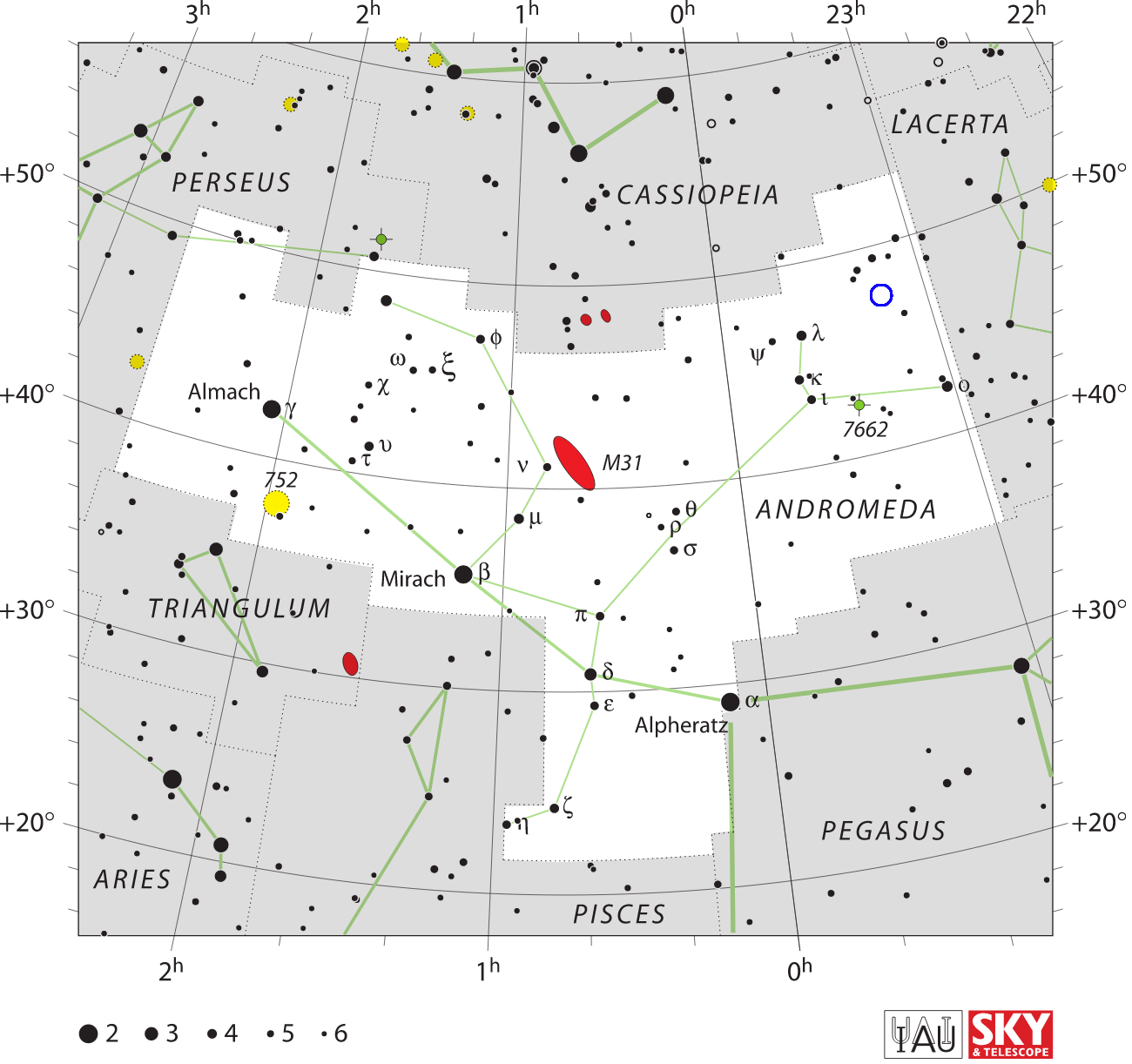
- Location of OS Andromedae (circled in blue)

Observation data Epoch J2000 Equinox ICRS
- Constellation: Andromeda
- Right ascension: 23^{h} 12^{m} 05.936^{s}
- Declination: +47° 28′ 19.49″
- Apparent magnitude (V): 6.3 - 18.0

Characteristics
- Variable type: Nova

Astrometry
Proper motion (μ)	RA: −1.944±0.211 mas/yr Dec.: −0.368±0.204 mas/yr
Parallax (π)	0.1378±0.1377 mas
Distance	3298+1670 −524 pc
Absolute magnitude (M_{V})	−7.56 - +3.3

Details

White dwarf
Mass	1.0 M_{☉}
Luminosity	84,000 (max) L_{☉}

Donor star

Other designations
- AAVSO 2307+46, Nova And 1986, Gaia DR2 1942264441241366144

Database references
SIMBAD	data

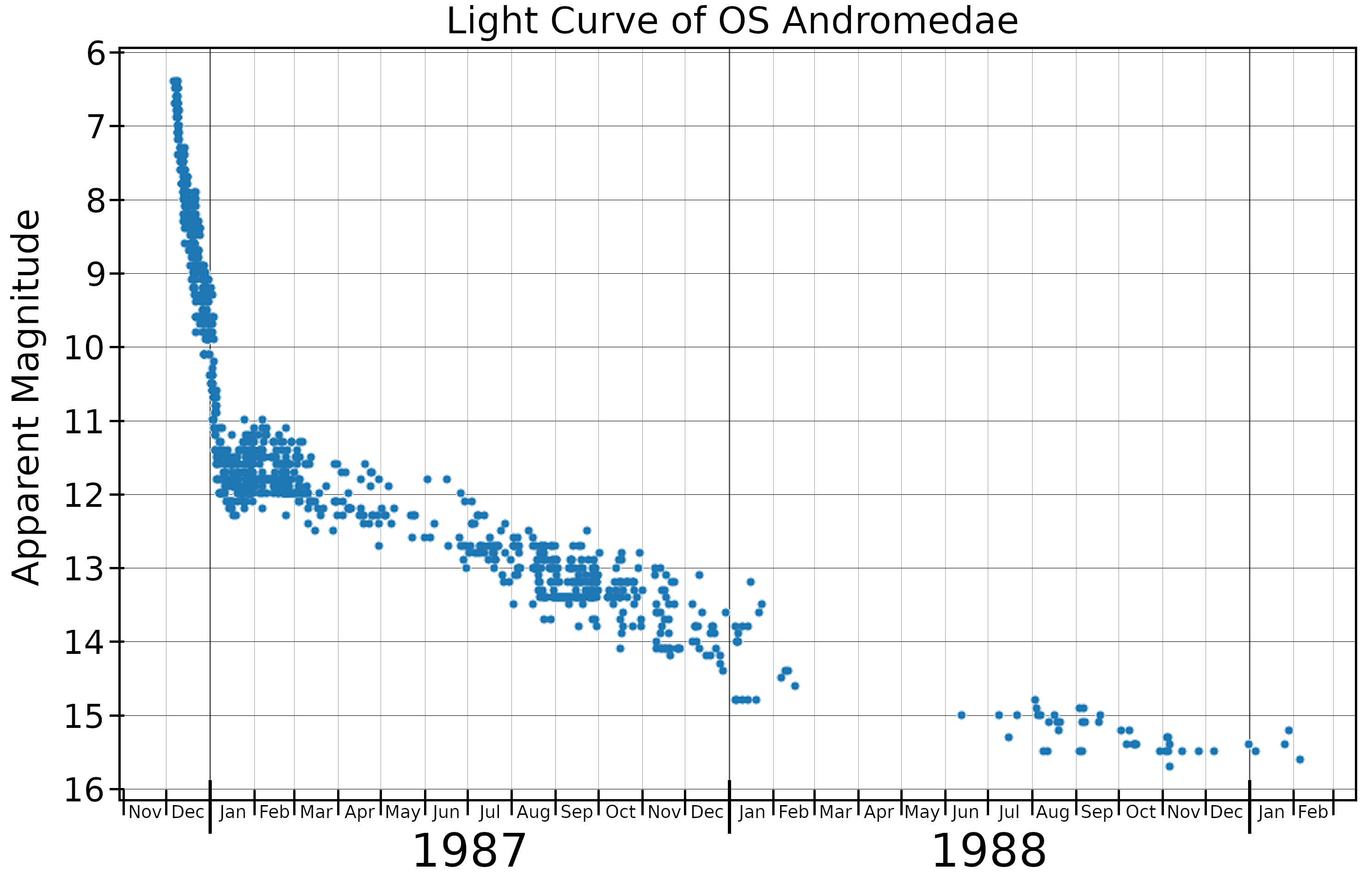
The light curve of OS Andromedae, plotted from AAVSO data

OS Andromedae, known also as Nova Andromedae 1986, is a classical nova that appeared in the constellation Andromeda during 1986. It was discovered at 10:34 UT on 5 December 1986 by Mitsuri Suzuki, a 28-year-old school teacher living in Ena, Japan. He photographed the portion of the Milky Way that passes through northern Andromeda with a 200-mm telephoto lens, and found the nova when its apparent magnitude was 8.0. Two days later it reached a peak apparent visual magnitude of 6.3.

OS Andromedae had an intrinsic decay time (for a three magnitude drop) of 25 days, making it a "fast" nova. A sudden decrease in visual and ultraviolet light, which occurred 30 days after the peak, was due to dust formation during the nova event. The mass of the white dwarf has been estimated to be 1.05 M_{☉} and it was estimated that 3.5×10^{−5} M_{☉} was ejected during the event. The chemical composition is typical of a CO nova. At the estimated distance of 4.2 kiloparsec, its absolute magnitude at the peak was -7.56.
