= CT Serpentis =

1948 nova in the constellation Serpens

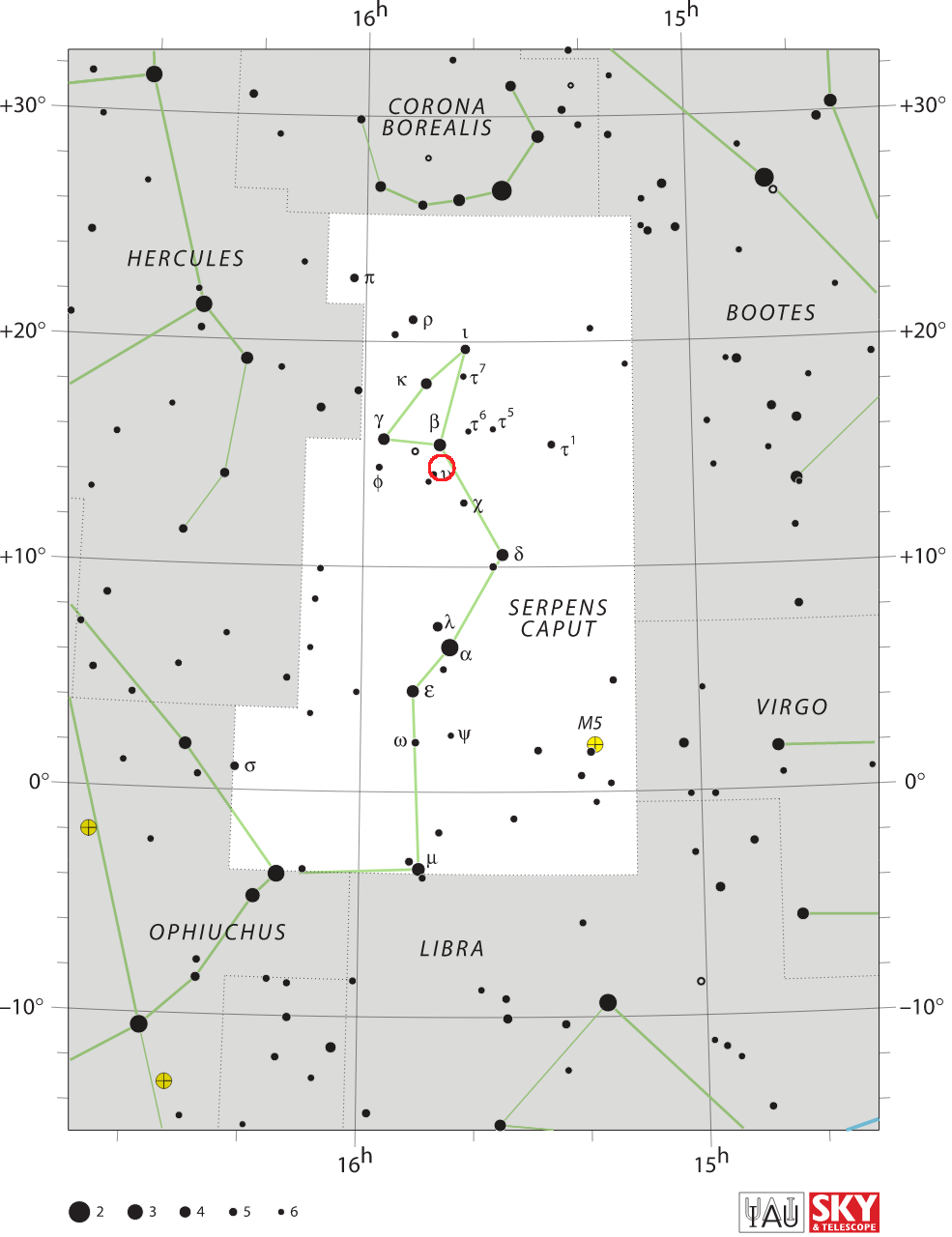
- Location of CT Serpentis (circled in red)

Observation data Epoch J2000.0 Equinox ICRS
- Constellation: Serpens
- Right ascension: 15^{h} 45^{m} 39.0752^{s}
- Declination: +14° 22′ 31.759″
- Apparent magnitude (V): ~5 Max. 16.6 Min.

Characteristics
- Spectral type: CV
- Variable type: Nova

Astrometry
Proper motion (μ)	RA: 3.780±0.119 mas/yr Dec.: −22.338±0.095 mas/yr
Parallax (π)	0.2304±0.0629 mas
Distance	2774+495 −268 pc

Details
Surface gravity (log g)	9.88±0.13 cgs
Temperature	10,772±230 K

Other designations
- Nova Ser 1948, AAVSO 1541+14, 2MASS J15453907+1422317

Database references
SIMBAD	data

CT Serpentis (also known as Nova Serpentis 1948) was a nova that appeared in the constellation Serpens in 1948. It was discovered by Ramze Alexander Bartaya at Abastumani Observatory on 9 April 1946. It is thought to have reached magnitude 6.0, but this is an extrapolation of its light curve as it was not observed until 9 April 1948 when it was at magnitude 9.0 and fading—clearly past its maximum.
