= V842 Centauri =

Nova in the constellation Centaurus seen in 1986

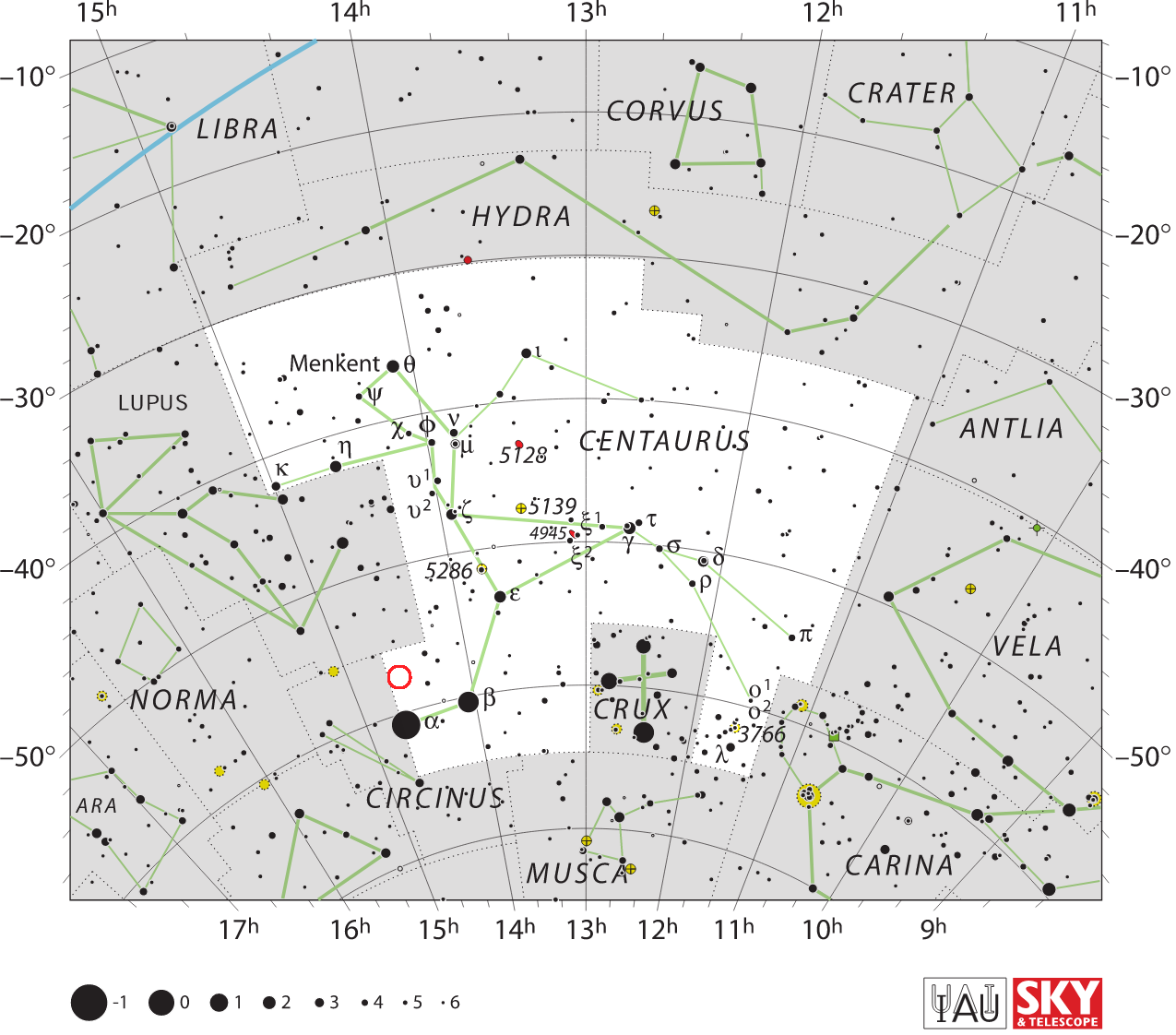
- Location of V842 Centauri (circled in red)

Observation data Epoch J2000.0 Equinox ICRS
- Constellation: Centaurus
- Right ascension: 14^{h} 35^{m} 52.568^{s}
- Declination: −57° 37′ 35.39″
- Apparent magnitude (V): 18.5 (pre-nova); 4.6 (max during nova); 16.5 (2010)

Characteristics
- Variable type: nova

Astrometry
Distance	4498+391 −254 ly (1379+120 −78 pc)
Absolute magnitude (M_{V})	−7.5 (max during nova)

Details
Mass	0.88 M_{☉}

Other designations
- Nova Centauri 1986, AAVSO 1428-57, Gaia DR2 5891405647833287296

Database references
SIMBAD	data

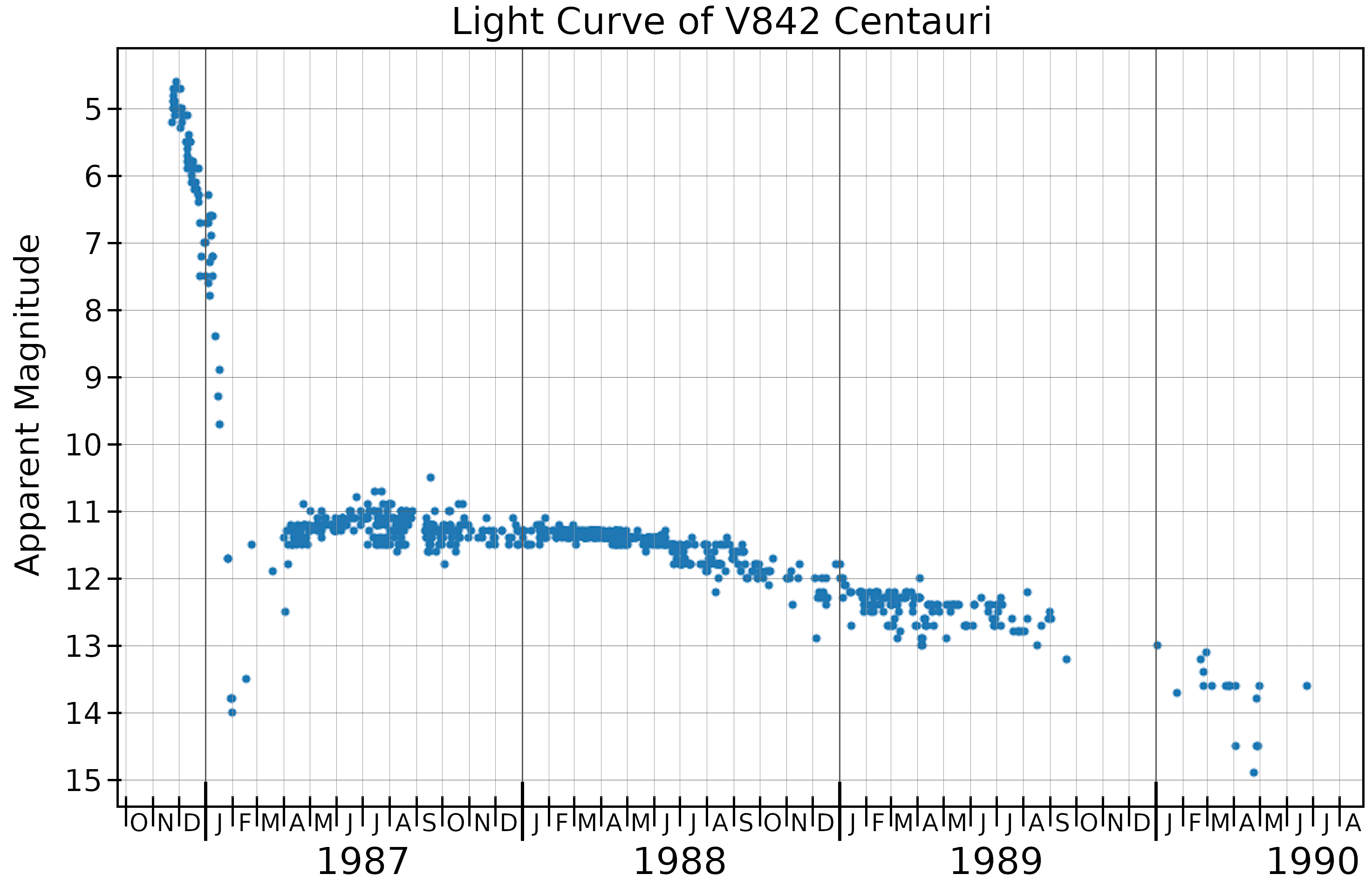
The light curve of V842 Centauri, plotted from AAVSO data

V842 Centauri, also known as Nova Centauri 1986, was a nova which occurred in 1986 in the constellation Centaurus. It was discovered by Robert H. McNaught of Siding Spring Observatory in Australia, on 22 November 1986. At the time of its discovery, it had an apparent magnitude of 5.6. It reached a peak magnitude of 4.6 one and a half days later, making it easily visible to the naked eye.

V842 Centauri is considered a moderately fast nova, having faded by 3 magnitudes after 48 days. Near the end of 1986, and early in 1987, its light curve showed a sharp drop in brightness, caused by the formation of dust. This dramatic fading lasted only about 50 days, before the nova brightened by about 2.5 magnitudes. By 2010, it had faded to magnitude 16.5, but was still 2 magnitudes brighter than before the nova eruption.

From its shell's expansion velocity, it is estimated to be at a distance of 1.5 kpc (4900 light-years) from Earth. Another method, based on the system's extinction rate, gives a similar distance of 1.65 ± 0.54 kpc. It was observed by the Gaia spacecraft, which measured a distance of 1.38 (+0.120, -0.078) kpc.

The mass of the white dwarf in V842 Centauri is estimated at 0.88 solar masses. The system is likely seem from a low inclination. An expanding nebula has been detected around V842 Centauri, formed by material ejected during the nova. It has two components, with diameters of 3.6" and 10.6", corresponding to material with different densities and expansion velocities.

A 2009 photometric study of V842 Centauri found a possible 57 seconds period in the system's light curve, which was interpreted as the white dwarf's rotation period. An orbital period of 3.94 hours was calculated from variations of this period. V842 Centauri was then classified as an intermediate polar, with the third fastest rotation period for a cataclismic system. However, two later studies revealed problems with this classification.

In 1995, observations with the 3.9 meter Anglo-Australian Telescope detected a very small (~1.5 arc second diameter) nova remnant shell surrounding V842 Centauri. By March 1998 the shell had expanded to 5.6 × 6.0 arc seconds.
