= Nova Herculis 2021 =

Nova in the constellation Hercules seen in 2021

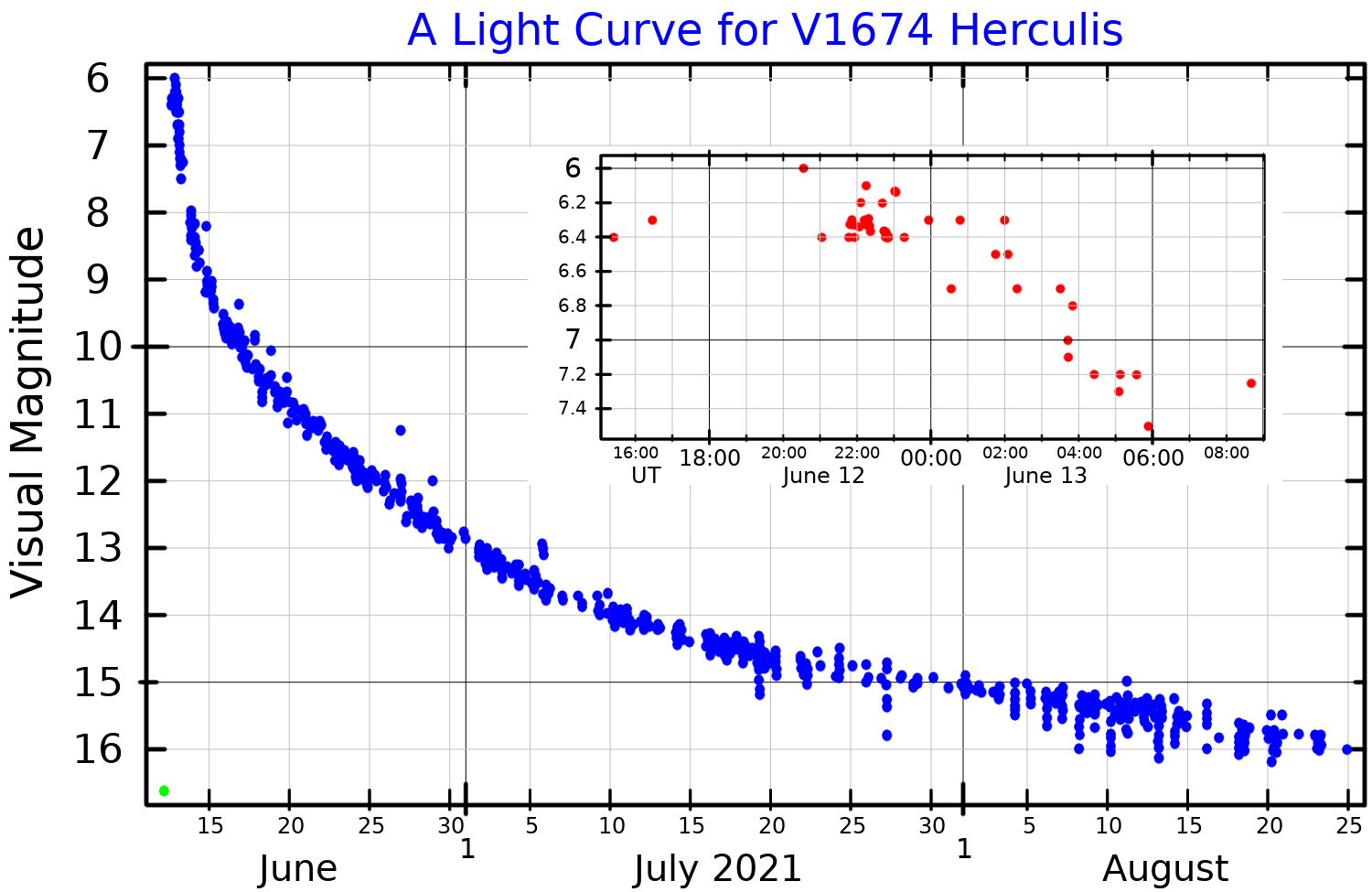
- A visual band light curve for Nova Herculis 2021, plotted from AAVSO data. The green point in the lower left corner shows the pre-discovery ASAS-SN data point. The inset plot shows the time of peak brightness.

Observation data Epoch J2000.0 Equinox ICRS
- Constellation: Hercules
- Right ascension: 18^{h} 57^{m} 30.98^{s}
- Declination: +16° 53′ 39.6″
- Apparent magnitude (V): 6.0 - <20.5 (g band)

Astrometry
Distance	~15,492 ly (~4,750 pc)

Characteristics
- Variable type: Nova

Orbit
Period (P)	3.6704±0.0008 hours

Details

White dwarf
Mass	1.09+0.07 −0.06 or 1.12±0.06 M_{☉}
Rotation	8.357 minutes

Other designations
- V1674 Her, TCP J18573095+1653396, ZTF19aasfsjq

Database references
SIMBAD	data

Nova Herculis 2021, also known V1674 Herculis, was a nova in the constellation Hercules. It reached a peak brightness of magnitude 6.0, making it visible to the naked eye under ideal observing conditions. It was discovered on June 12, 2021, by Seiji Ueda of Kushiro Japan, just hours before it obtained peak brightness. The discovery images were taken with a Canon EOS 6D digital camera with a 200 mm lens, when the nova was at magnitude 8.4. Subsequent analysis of ASAS-SN data showed the star had a magnitude of 16.62 (g band) 8.4 hours before it was discovered. Of the galactic novae for which detailed light curves are available, Nova Herculis 2021 had the fastest decline from peak brightness ever seen. This nova has been detected throughout the electromagnetic spectrum, from radio to gamma rays.

All novae are binary stars, consisting of a white dwarf orbited by a mass-losing "donor star". Photometric observations taken during June, July and August 2021 found that binary pair's orbital period is 3.6704±0.0008 hours. The Zwicky Transient Facility had been observing the region of the sky containing Nova Herculis 2021 since March 2018, and analysis of that data yielded a spin period of 8.357 minutes for the white dwarf.
