= V1494 Aquilae =

Nova seen in 1999 in the constellation of Aquila

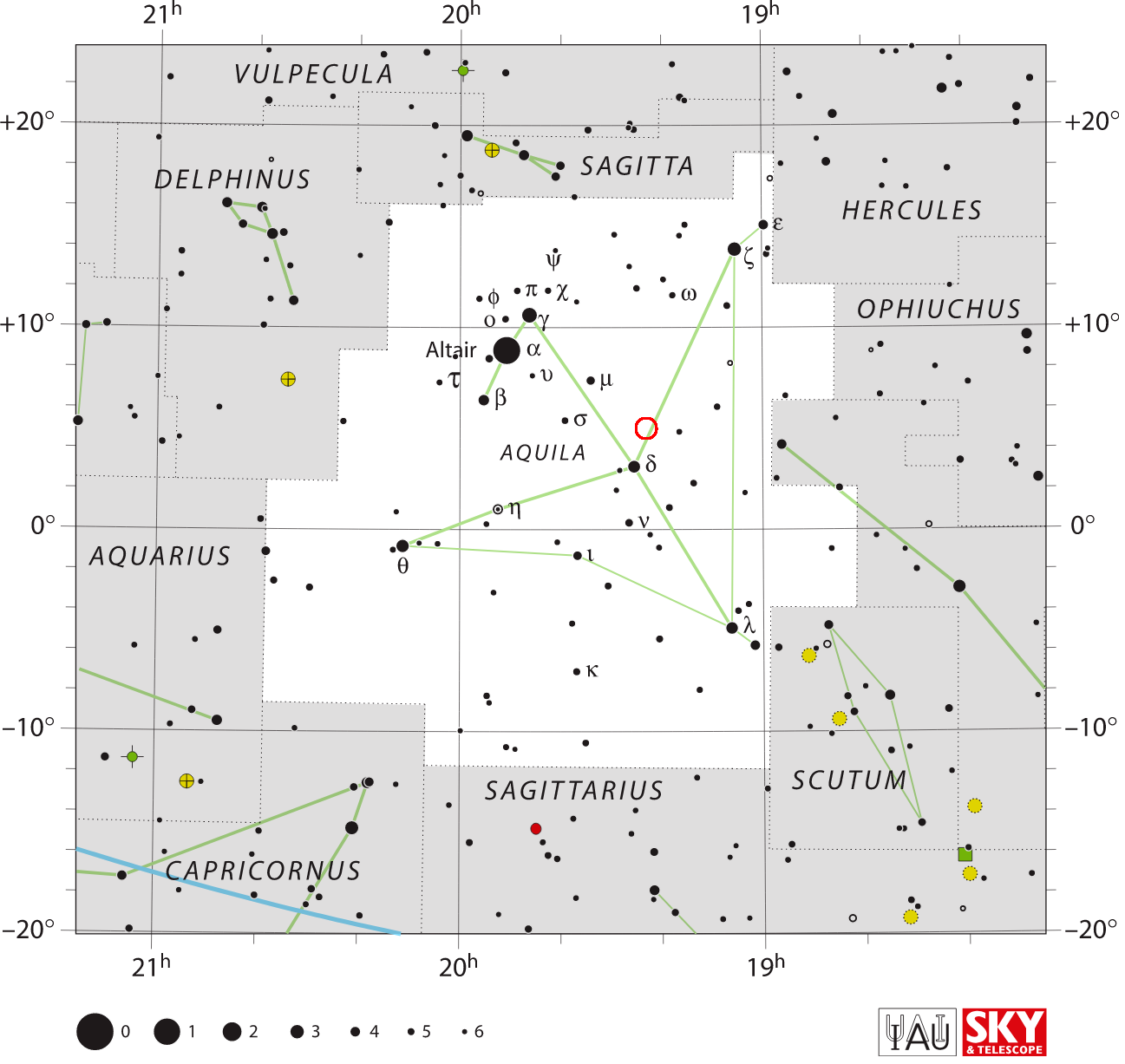
- Location of V1494 Aquilae (circled in red)

Observation data Epoch J2000.0 Equinox ICRS
- Constellation: Aquila
- Right ascension: 19^{h} 23^{m} 05.30^{s}
- Declination: 04° 57′ 19.1″
- Apparent magnitude (V): 3.9 Max. 17.1 Min.

Characteristics
- Variable type: Classical Nova, eclipsing binary

Astrometry
Parallax (π)	0.5615±0.1281 mas
Distance	1,239+422 −127 pc
Absolute magnitude (M_{V})	−8.2 Max. 4.8 Min.

Orbit
Period (P)	0.1346 days
Semi-major axis (a)	1.17 - 1.24 R_{☉}
Inclination (i)	78.5°

Details

white dwarf
Mass	0.92 - 1.13 M_{☉}
Luminosity	750 - 3,000 L_{☉}
Temperature	>100,000 (2000) K

donor
Mass	0.28 M_{☉}
Temperature	3,000 K

Other designations
- Nova Aquilae 1999 b, AAVSO 1918+04

Database references
SIMBAD	data

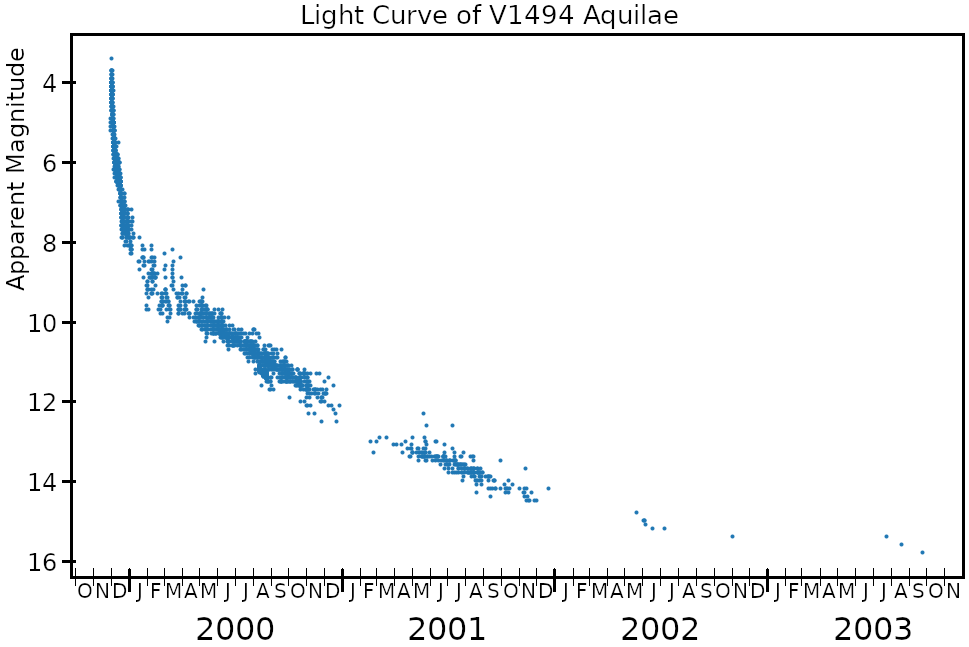
The light curve of V1494 Aquilae, from AAVSO data

V1494 Aquilae or Nova Aquilae 1999 b was a nova which occurred during 1999 in the constellation Aquila and reached a brightness of magnitude 3.9 on 2 December 1999. making it easily visible to the naked eye. The nova was discovered with 14×100 binoculars by Alfredo Pereira of Cabo da Roca, Portugal at 18:50 UT on 1 December 1999, when it had a visual magnitude of 6.0.

V1494 Aquilae is classified as a fast nova, meaning it faded from peak brightness by more than 3 magnitudes in less than 100 days. During its decline, V1494 Aql produced unusual variations in its x-ray radiation, including a bright burst lasting several minutes. During 2000, the x-ray spectrum developed from a hard (high energy) emission-line spectrum to a spectrum typical of a super soft X-ray source. The x-ray intensity varied with a period of about 40 minutes, probably due to pulsations induced in the white dwarf by its re-kindled hydrogen fusion.

All novae are binary systems with two stars orbiting so close to each other that one star, the "donor" star transfers matter to the other star which is a white dwarf. In the case of V1494 the white dwarf has a mass of 1.20M_{☉}, and it is accreting mass from the donor star at a rate of 2.1 × 10^{−10} M_{☉} yr^{−1}. The stars' orbital period is 3.23 hours, and the system is an eclipsing binary with two brightness minima each orbit, one 0.5 and one 0.1 magnitudes deep. This apparently is a measurement of two stars of approximately equal brightness, the nova and a companion 1.4″ to the south east. Measuring only the brightness of the nova, the eclipses are about two magnitudes deep. The white dwarf is probably an oxygen-neon-magnesium type.

Unlike some novae, the material ejected from V1494 Aquilae has not formed a visible nebula around the star. However, a shell approximately 6.5″ across has been detected spectroscopically in H-alpha emission.

The distance to V1494 Aquilae has been estimated by different methods. Early estimates were based on assumptions about the luminosity of the nova and gave distances around 1.2 kpc. Later models assumed distances of up to 2.2 kpc. Comparison of the measured shell size with the observed expansion velocity give a distance of 1.2±0.2 kpc. Gaia DR2 published a parallax of 0.8394±0.1415 mas, corresponding to a distance of 1,239+422
−127 kpc. Gaia EDR3 published a parallax of 0.5615±0.1281 mas, corresponding to a distance around 1,800 kpc.
