= V630 Sagittarii =

Nova that appeared in 1936

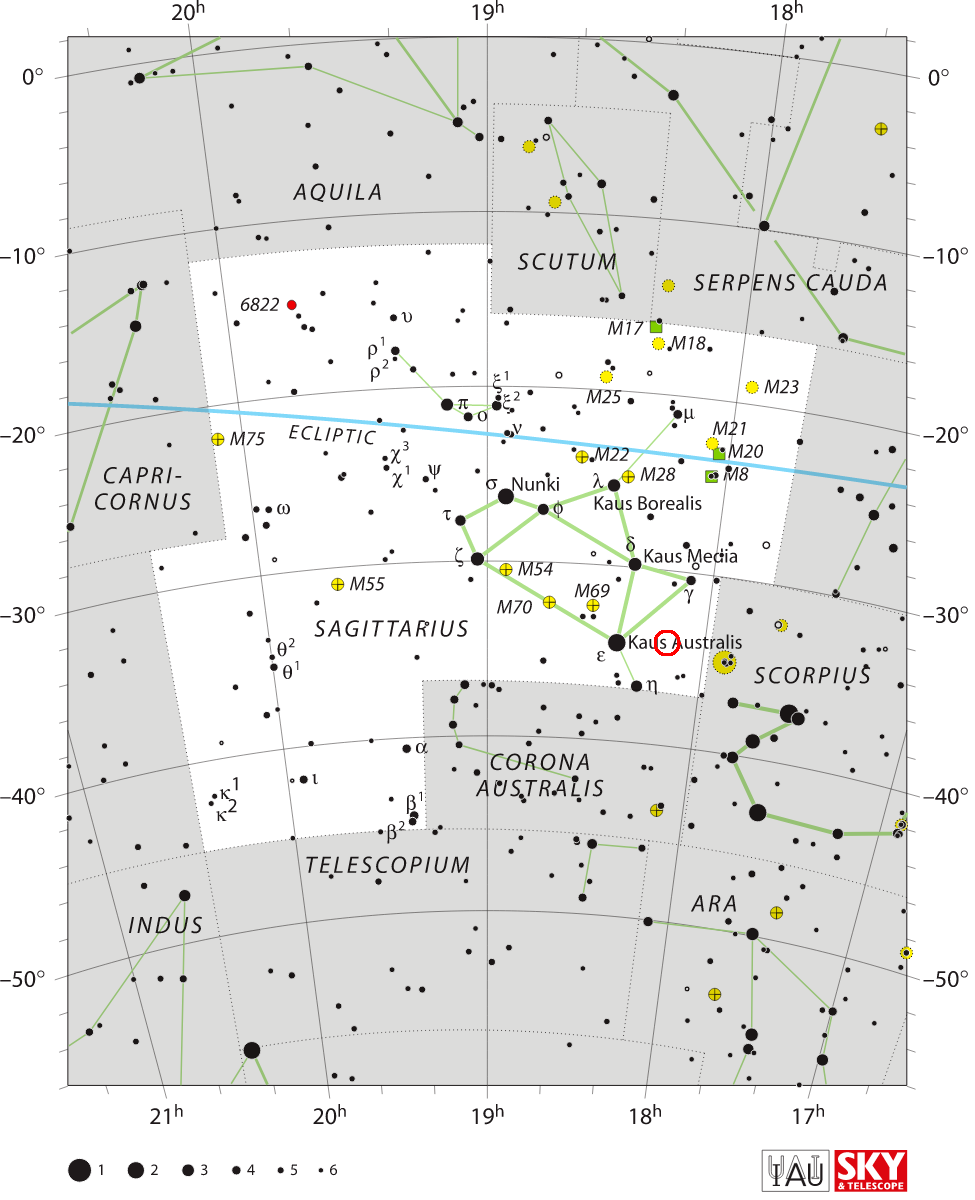
- Location of V630 Sagittarii (circled in red)

Observation data Epoch J2000.0 Equinox J2000.0
- Constellation: Sagittarius
- Right ascension: 18^{h} 08^{m} 48.25^{s}
- Declination: −34° 20′ 21.4″
- Apparent magnitude (V): 4.5 - 21.3

Characteristics
- Variable type: Nova, VY Scl, and eclipsing

Astrometry
Distance	2000 pc

Other designations
- Nova Sgr 1936c HD 321353; AAVSO 1802-34

Database references
SIMBAD	data

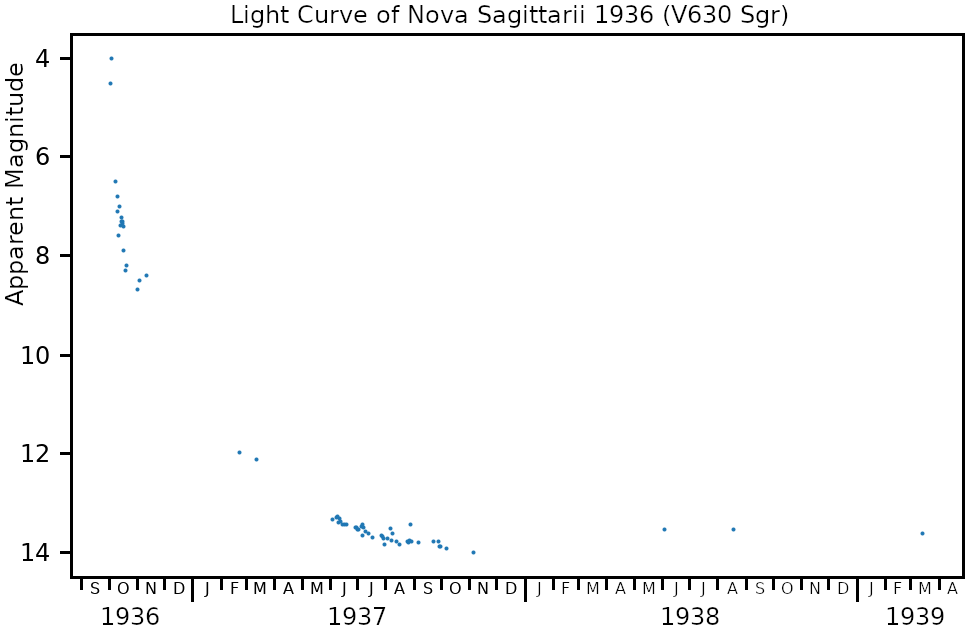
The light curve for V630 Sgr. Data from the AAVSO, Warner (2006) and Gaposchkin (1955) are plotted.

V630 Sagittarii (Nova Sagittarii 1936) was a nova visible to the naked eye in 1936. It was discovered on 3 October 1936 by Shigeki Okabayashi of Kobe, Japan when it had an apparent magnitude of 4.5.

There is disagreement within the astronomical literature about what this nova's peak brightness was. Both Warner and Downes et al. report a peak brightness of magnitude 1.6 but Duerbeck reports 4.0 in rough agreement with the Harrison and Gehrz value of 4.5. The AAVSO database contains no magnitude estimates for this star brighter than 6.5 (on 8 October 1936), indicating that whatever the peak brightness was, the star was barely visible to the naked eye just five days after its discovery. Its light curve shows it to be one of the most rapidly fading novae on record.

Duerbeck estimated that the star's absolute magnitude at peak brightness was −9.3. Diaz and Steiner list it as a possible magnetic nova, due to its short decay time (< 20 days) and large amplitude outburst.

All classical novae are binary systems, with a donor star losing mass onto the surface of a white dwarf. Mróz et al. report that in the case of V630 Sagittarii, the donor star is a main sequence star. Since all classical novae are very close binary systems, they are frequently also eclipsing binaries. Woudt and Warner detected these eclipses, which are 0.4 to 0.6 magnitudes deep, allowing them to derive an orbital period of 2.831 hours. Mróz et al. report the presence of superhumps.
