= V368 Aquilae =

Nova seen in 1936

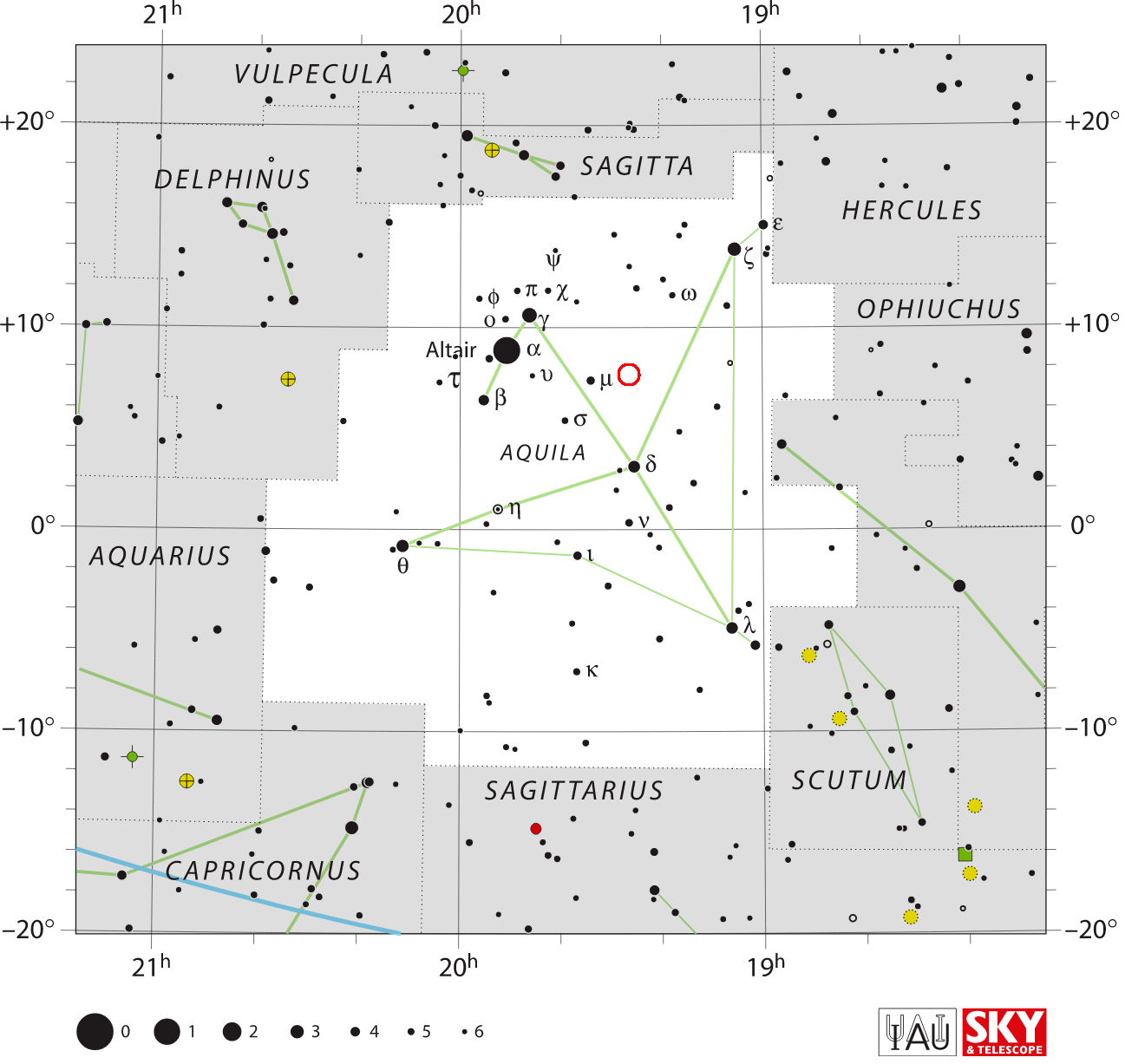
- Location of V368 Aquilae (circled in red)

Observation data Epoch J2000 Equinox J2000
- Constellation: Aquila
- Right ascension: 19^{h} 26^{m} 34.460^{s}
- Declination: 07° 36′ 13.81″
- Apparent magnitude (V): 5.0 - 16.6

Astrometry
Proper motion (μ)	RA: −1.668 mas/yr Dec.: −0.730 mas/yr
Parallax (π)	0.393 mas
Distance	2722+612 −253 pc

Characteristics
- Variable type: Classical Nova, eclipsing binary

Other designations
- Nova Aql 1936 2, AAVSO 1921+07, Gaia DR2 4295580518601261696

Database references
SIMBAD	data

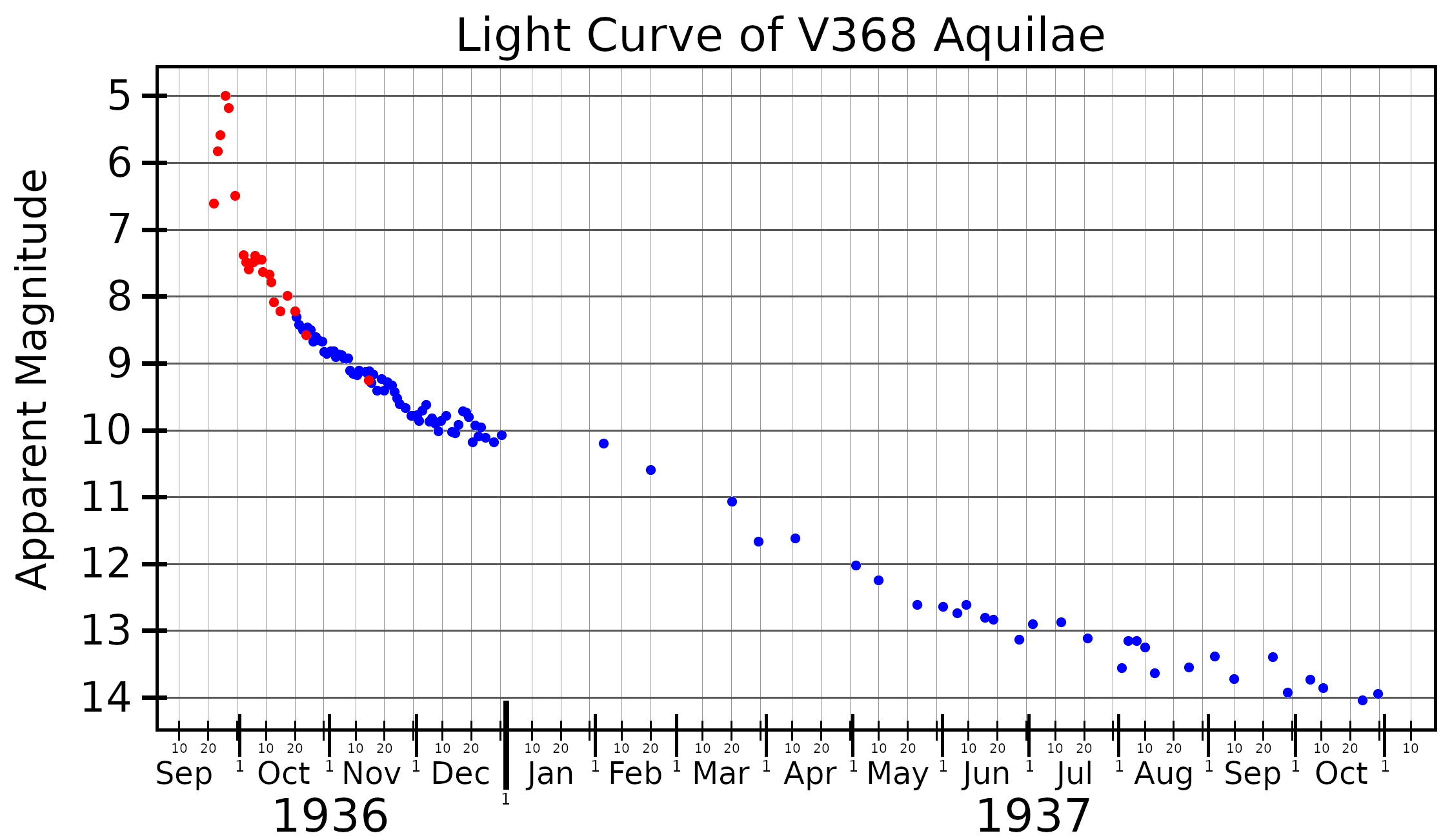
The light curve of V368 Aql, plotted from data presented by Parenago. The red points are visible light magnitudes, and the blue points are photographic magnitudes.

V368 Aquilae, also known as Nova Aquilae 1936 no. 2 was the second nova which occurred in the constellation of Aquila during 1936 (the first was the fainter V356 Aquilae, which was discovered on 18 September 1936). It was discovered on a photographic plate by Nils Tamm at Kvistaberg Observatory on 7 October 1936. At the time of discovery it was at photographic magnitude 7, and was already fading. Pre-discovery photographs showed that peak brightness occurred around 25 September 1936, at which time it had reached apparent magnitude 5.0, making it visible to the naked eye. The nova was described as being fiery red due to strong Hα emission, and for a time could be seen with binoculars simultaneously with V356 Aquilae, another nova which Nill Tamm had discovered a month earlier.

V368 Aquilae is classified as a "moderately fast nova"; it dropped by three magnitudes in about 42 days.

All novae are binary stars, with a "donor" star orbiting a white dwarf. The two stars are so close to each other that matter is transferred from the donor star to the white dwarf. Because the separation between the stars is comparable to the size of the donor star, these stars are often eclipsing binaries and V368 Aquilae does show eclipses. Marin and Shfter studied these eclipses, which have a depth of about 0.25 magnitudes and a period of 16.57 hours - an unusually long orbital period for a nova.
