= V705 Cassiopeiae =

Nova seen in 1993

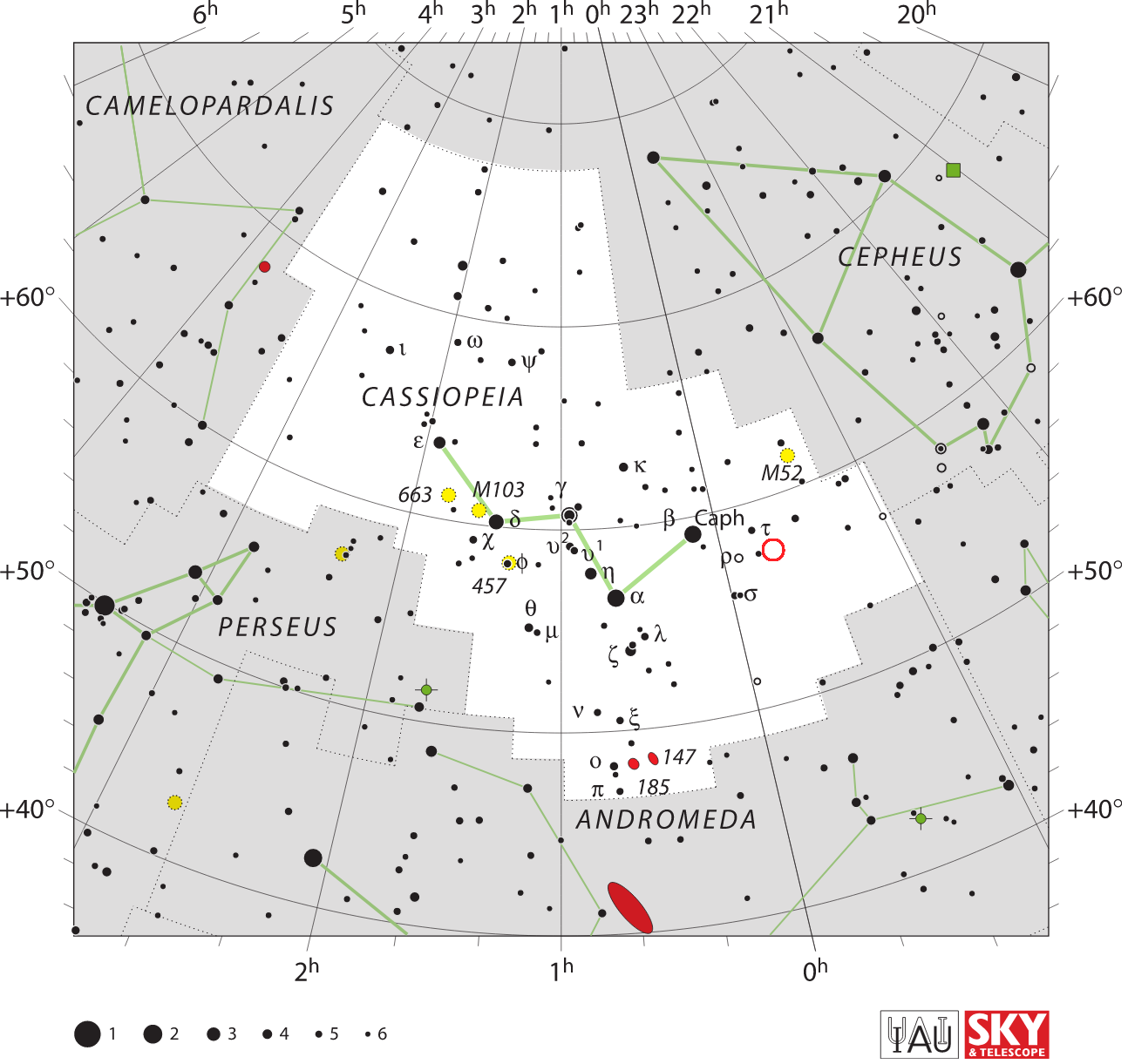
- Location of V705 Cassiopeiae (circled in red)

Observation data Epoch J2000.0 Equinox ICRS
- Constellation: Cassiopeia
- Right ascension: 23^{h} 41^{m} 47.19^{s}
- Declination: 57° 30′ 59.5″
- Apparent magnitude (V): 5.3 - 16.4

Characteristics
- Variable type: Nova

Astrometry
Distance	2157+799 −228 pc

Other designations
- V705 Cas, Nova Cassiopeiae 1993, AAVSO 2337+56

Database references
SIMBAD	data

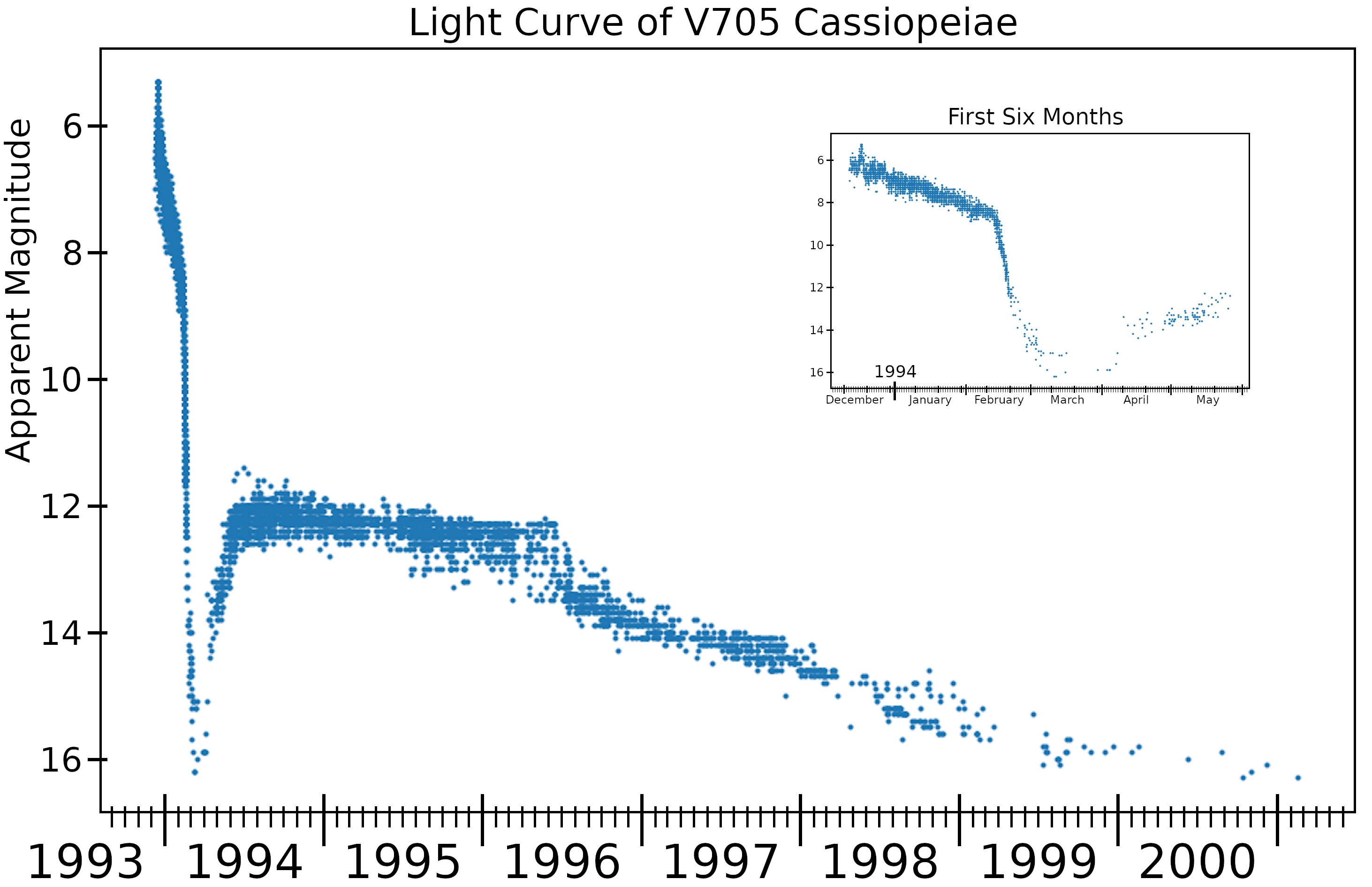
The light curve of V705 Cassiopeiae, plotted from AAVSO data

V705 Cassiopeiae, also known as Nova Cassiopeiae 1993, was a nova which erupted in the constellation Cassiopeia during 1993. The nova was discovered at 11:17 UT on 7 December 1993 by amateur astronomer Kazuyoshi Kanatsu of Matsue, Japan, who photographed it using a 35mm camera with a 55mm f/2.8 lens. Asteroid 6976 Kanatsu was named after him in honor of this discovery. At the time of its discovery the nova had a photographic magnitude of 6.5. Around December 18, 1993, it flared briefly to magnitude 5.3 (making it visible to the naked eye), and then it returned rapidly to magnitude 6.5. It underwent a series of smaller flares until mid February 1993, after which it began a precipitous decline in brightness.

The light curve of V705 Cassiopeiae showed a very pronounced "dust dip", and its brightness fell to about 16th magnitude in mid March 1994, before rebounding to about magnitude 12.5 where it stayed for about two years, after which it declined further. This dust dip occurs when dust forms as the material ejected in the nova explosion expands and cools. The nova ultimately faded to a quiescent magnitude of 16.4.

All novae are binary stars, with a "donor" star orbiting a white dwarf. The two stars are so close to each other that material is passed from the donor star to the white dwarf. The orbital period for the binary that forms V705 Cassiopeiae is 5.472 hours. The white dwarf is estimated to have a mass of 1.05 M_{☉} and to be receiving 2×10^{−9} M_{☉} per year of material from the donor star.
