= V1059 Sagittarii =

Nova seen in 1898 in the constellation Sagittarius

Nova Sagittarii 1898
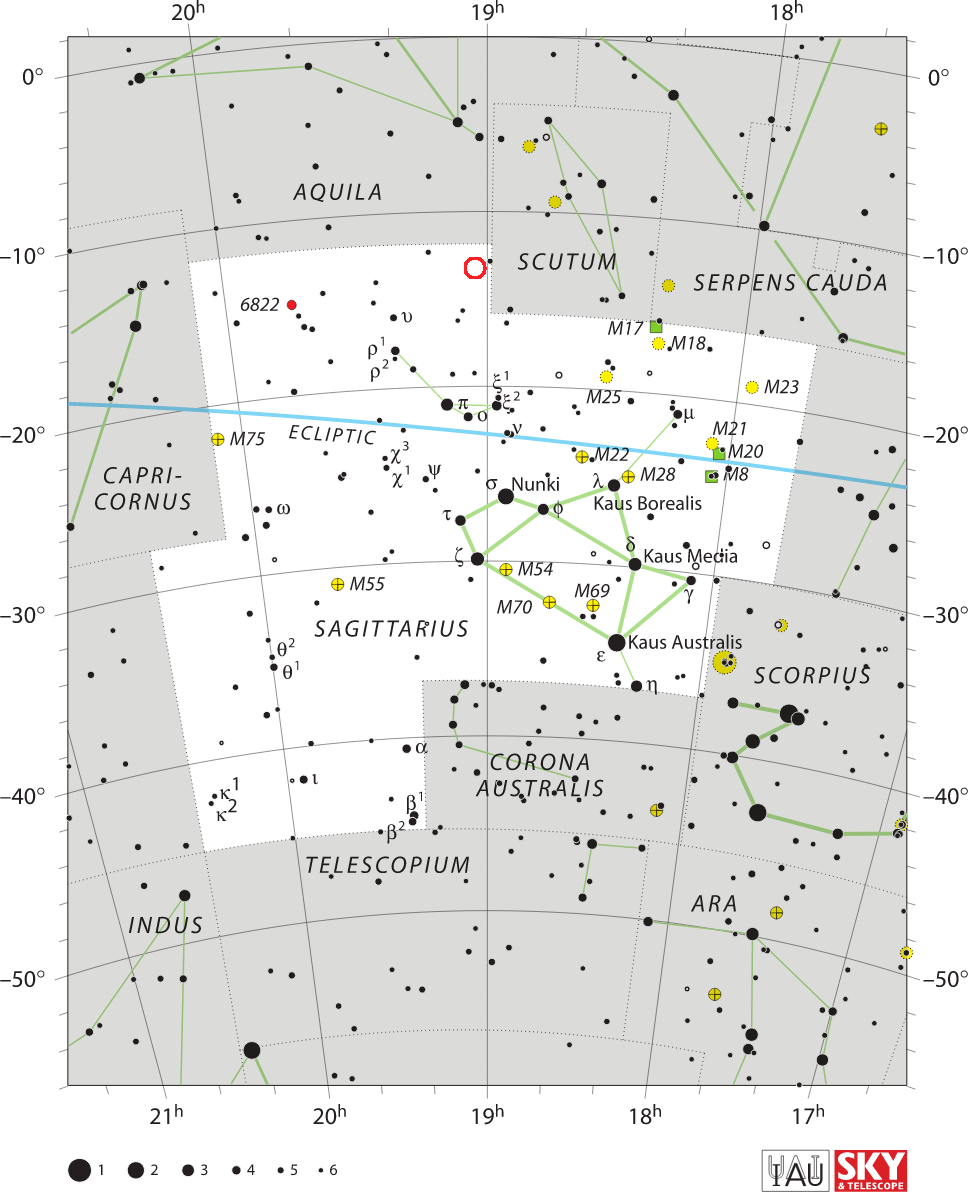
- Location of V1059 Sagittarii (circled in red)

Observation data Epoch J2000.0 Equinox ICRS
- Constellation: Sagittarius
- Right ascension: 19^{h} 01^{m} 50.556^{s}
- Declination: −13° 09′ 41.86″
- Apparent magnitude (V): 4.9(photographic) — 18.1(blue)

Other designations
- Nova Sgr 1898, V1059 Sgr, HD 176654, 2MASS J19015056-1309420, Gaia DR2 4198482401904374016

Database references
SIMBAD	data

V1059 Sagittarii (also called Nova Sagittarii 1898) was a nova, which lit up in 1898 in the constellation Sagittarius. The star reached apparent magnitude 4.5, making it easily visible to the naked eye. It was discovered on 8 March 1898, by Williamina Fleming on a photographic plate taken at the Harvard College Observatory. The discovery plate was an objective prism plate, part of the Henry Draper Memorial Photographs, and Ms Fleming identified it as a nova based on its spectral characteristics.

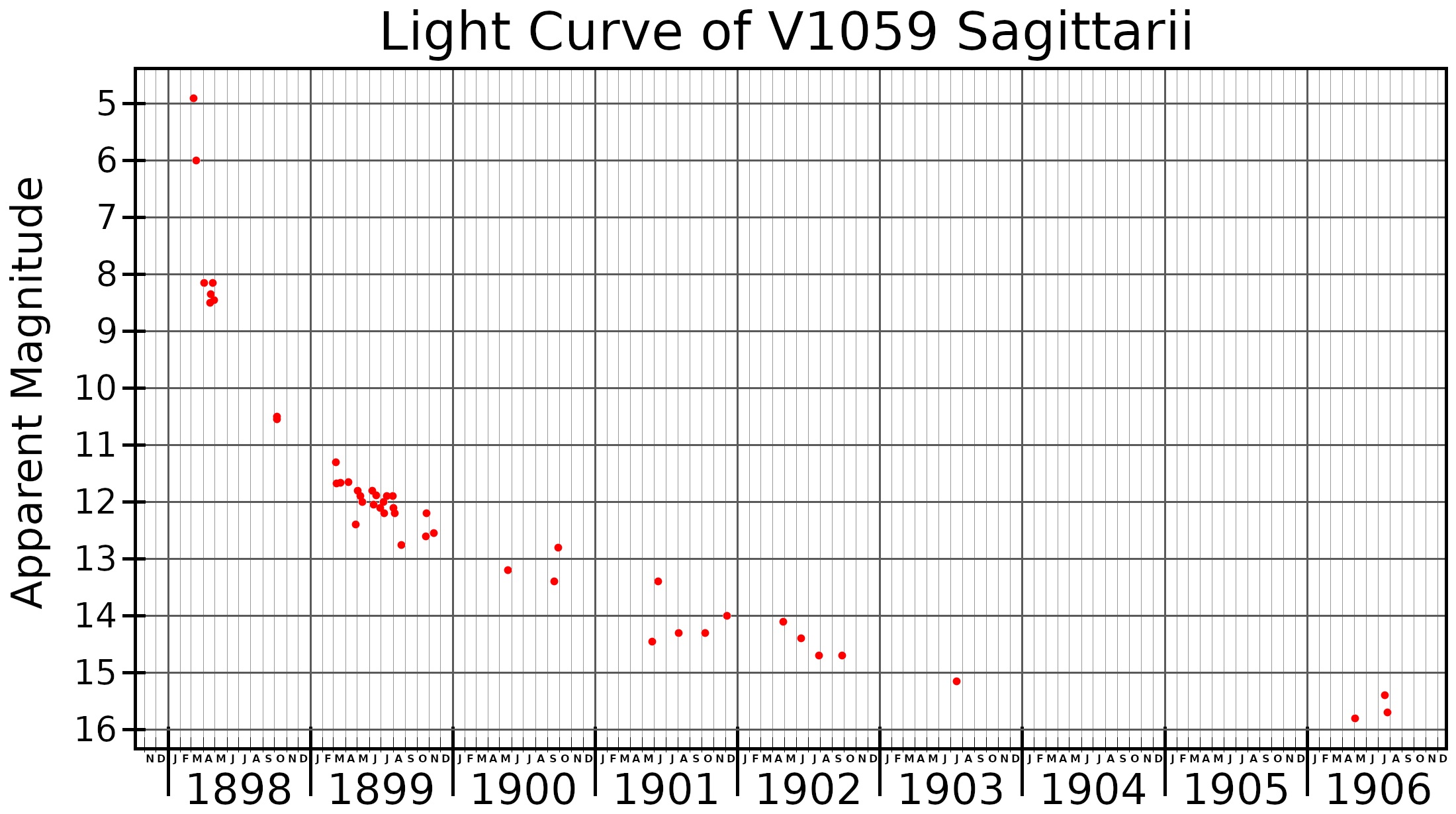
The light curve of nova V1059 Sagittarii, plotted from photographic magnitude data tabulated by Walker & Shapley. The points listed with identical times were averaged before plotting.

The astronomical literature contains a variety of values for V1059 Sagittarii's peak brightness. Özdönmez et al. list the peak magnitude as 2.0 (visual), while Downes et al. report a much fainter value of magnitude 4.9 (photographic). Novae are usually classified as "fast" or "slow" based on the time it takes the star to drop from peak brightness by more than 3 magnitudes (T3), but for this nova the decline from maximum was poorly observed, and no T3 value has been reported. Nonetheless, it is classified as a fast nova. Vogt et al. monitored the quiescent nova 116 years after the nova event, and saw minor (0.5 to 0.8 magnitude) variations occurring at irregular intervals, similar to low amplitude dwarf nova outbursts.

All novae are binary stars, with a "donor" star orbiting a white dwarf. The two stars are so close to each other that matter is transferred from the donor to the white dwarf. In the case of V1059 Sagittarii, pair's orbital period is 6.866±0.017 hours.
