= AB Boötis =

Nova seen in 1877

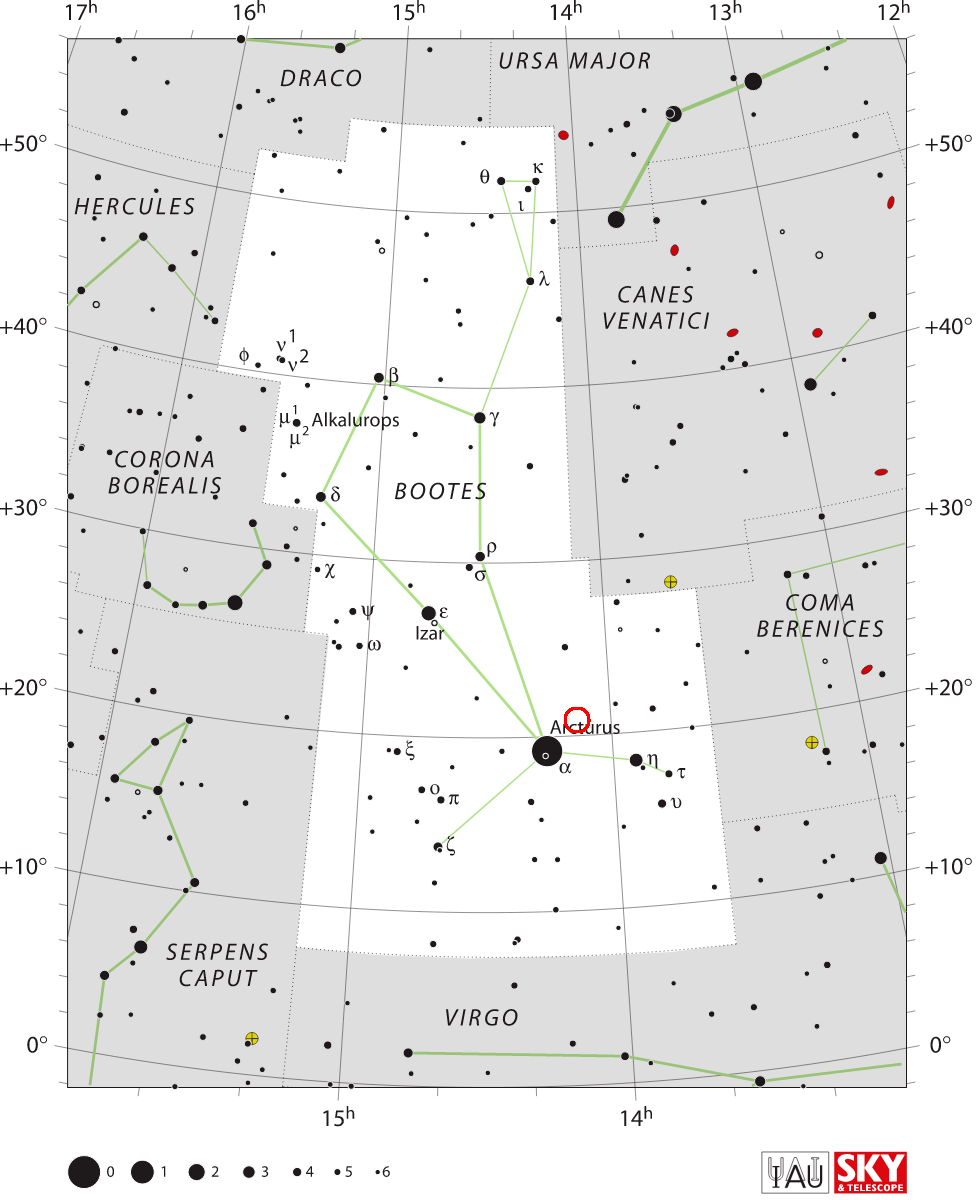
- Location of AB Boötis (circled in red)

Observation data Epoch J2000.0 Equinox ICRS
- Constellation: Boötes
- Right ascension: 14^{h} 07^{m} 04.4^{s}
- Declination: +20° 44′ 45″
- Apparent magnitude (V): 4.5 – 22

Characteristics
- Variable type: nova?

Other designations
- AB Boo, Nova Boötis 1877, Nova Comae Berenices 1877

Database references
SIMBAD	data

AB Boötis, also known as Nova Boötis 1877 and occasionally Nova Comae Berenices 1877, is an object that may have undergone a nova outburst in 1877. It was discovered by Friedrich Schwab at Technische Universität Ilmenau in 1877. He reported observing the star as a 5th magnitude object, visible to the naked eye, on 14 nights during the period from 30 May 1877 through 14 July 1877. During that time interval, his estimate of the star's brightness only changed by 0.42 magnitudes. The star was lost (Schwab noticed its absence on January 9, 1878), and despite several searches in subsequent years, no other 19th century observations of the nova were reported. Downes et al. estimate that Schwab's reported coordinates for the star may have had a precision no better than 1/2 degree. In 1971, A. Sh. Khatisov suggested that the star Schwab saw was BD +21°2606 (whose visual magnitude is 10.64 in the Tycho-2 Catalogue, roughly 100 times fainter than the object Schwab reported), but that identification may be incorrect.

In 1988 Downes and Szkody imaged the area around AB Boötis' reported position, to try to identify the nova in its quiescent state based on its color, but their search was unsuccessful. In 2000, Liu et al. published a spectrum of AB Boötis, which they describe as a cataclysmic variable (a class which includes novae), but they did not publish the coordinates of the star they examined, so exactly which star they observed is unclear. In 2020, Hoffmann and Vogt suggested that AB Boötis might be a re-appearance of a guest star that Chinese astronomers saw near Arcturus in 203 BCE.
