= OY Arae =

1910 nova in the constellation Ara

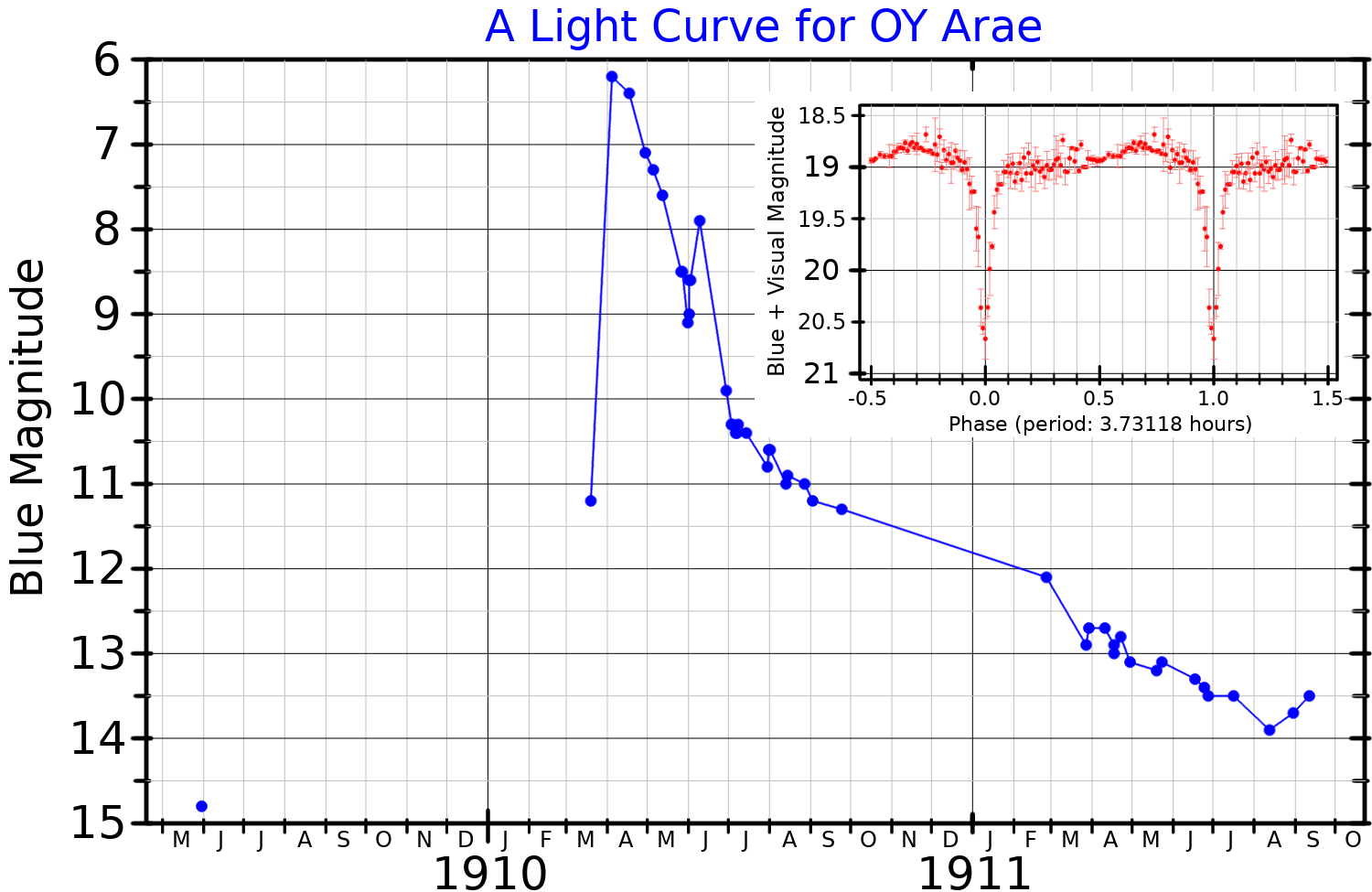
- A light curve for OY Arae. The main plot (from data published by Walker and Shapley) shows the 1910 eruption, and the inset plot (adapted from Zhao and McClintock) shows the eclipse light curve measured in 1995.

Observation data Epoch J2000 Equinox ICRS
- Constellation: Ara
- Right ascension: 16^{h} 40^{m} 50.456^{s}
- Declination: −52° 25′ 47.98″
- Apparent magnitude (V): 18.7

Characteristics
- Apparent magnitude (B): 6.0 – 18.6
- B−V color index: −0.15
- Variable type: Nova + eclipsing

Astrometry
Proper motion (μ)	RA: −3.689 mas/yr Dec.: −3.182 mas/yr
Parallax (π)	0.2676±0.0714 mas
Distance	approx. 12,000 ly (approx. 3,700 pc)
Absolute magnitude (M_{V})	−6.7 (at peak) 4.6 (quiescent)

Orbit
Period (P)	3.72936 h
Semi-major axis (a)	1.28±0.04 R_{☉}
Inclination (i)	74.3±1.2°

Details

white dwarf
Mass	0.82±0.12 M_{☉}

donor
Mass	0.34±0.01 M_{☉}

Other designations
- Nova Arae 1910, HD 149990, 2MASS J16405045-5225479

Database references
SIMBAD	data

OY Arae, also known as Nova Arae 1910, is a nova in the constellation Ara. It was discovered by Williamina Fleming on a Harvard Observatory photographic plate taken on April 4, 1910. At that time it had a magnitude of 6.0, making it faintly visible to the naked eye under ideal observing conditions. Examination of earlier plates showed that before the outburst it was a magnitude 17.5 object, and by March 19, 1910, it had reached magnitude 12.

OY Arae is considered to be a moderately fast nova, because it faded by 3 magnitudes during the 83 days after discovery. The light curve shows a secondary maximum in June 1910. The first spectrum of the nova was obtained on July 5, 1910, and resembled that of a gaseous nebula. An optical identification of the quiescent nova was made in 1994, and spectra taken at that time showed strong Balmer lines in emission atop a blue continuum.

All novae are binary stars, with a "donor" star orbiting a white dwarf. The two stars are so close to each other that material is transferred from the donor to the white dwarf. Because the distance between the two stars is comparable to the radius of the donor star, novae are often eclipsing binaries, and OY Arae does show eclipses. The primary eclipse, in which the donor star eclipses the white dwarf and its accretion disk, are about 2 magnitudes deep and last less than 30 minutes. The orbital period is 3.73118 hours. The mass of the white dwarf is 0.82±0.12 M_{☉}, and the mass of the donor star is 0.34±0.01 M_{☉}. The two stars are separated by 1.28±0.04 R_{☉}.

Most of the luminosity of the system is produced by the disk of material being stripped from the donor star. This is estimated to be 7 magnitudes brighter than the donor star itself, with the white dwarf being even fainter. The absolute magnitude of the system is given as +4.6, but this value is distorted by the shape of the disk, seen nearly edge-on. A mean absolute magnitude adjusted for viewing angle is +3.6.
