= V849 Ophiuchi =

Nova in the constellation Ophiuchus

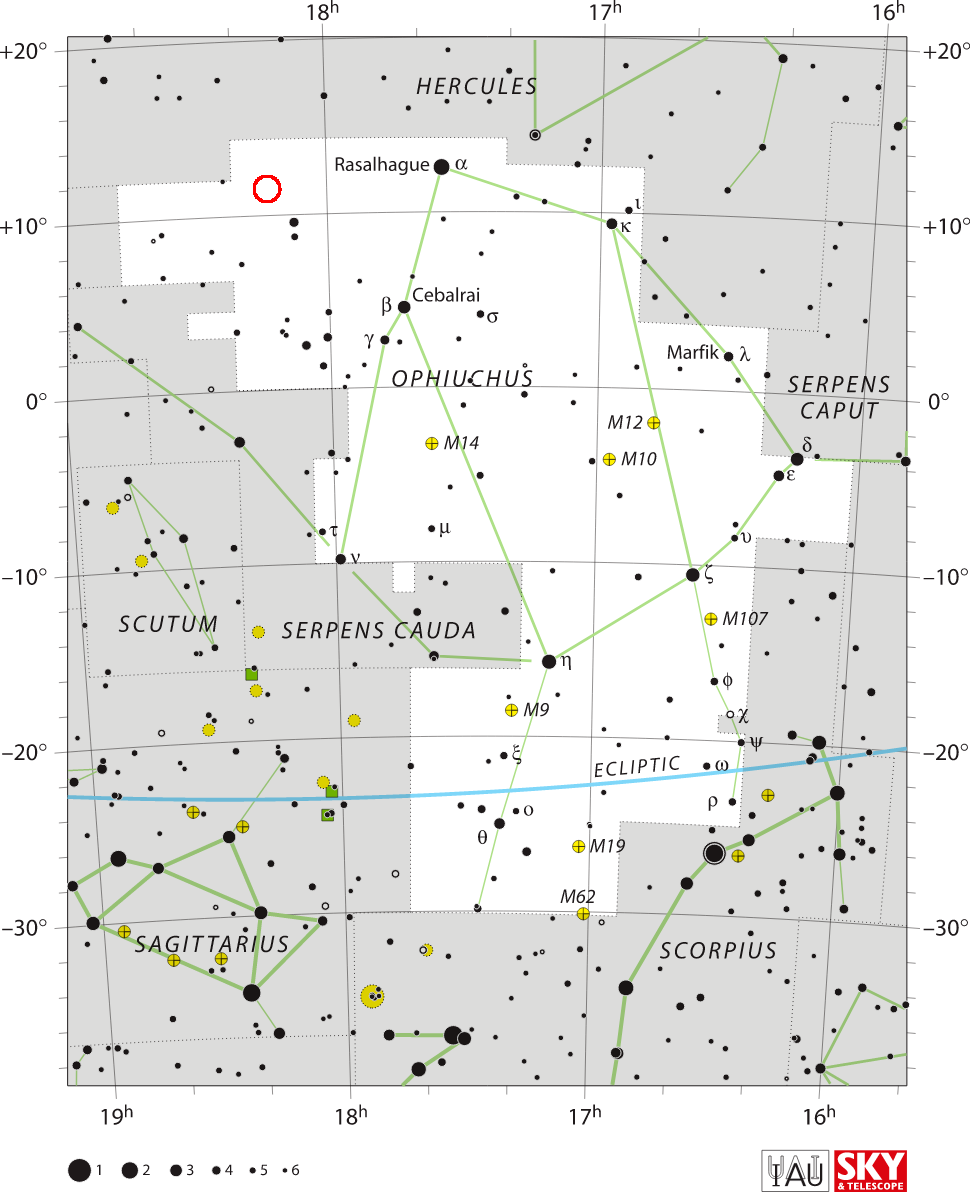
- Location of V849 Ophiuchi (circled in red)

Observation data Epoch J2000.0 Equinox ICRS
- Constellation: Ophiuchus
- Right ascension: 18^{h} 14^{m} 07.3048^{s}
- Declination: +11° 36′ 42.140″
- Apparent magnitude (V): 7.6 Max. 18.8 Min.

Characteristics
- Variable type: Nova

Astrometry
Proper motion (μ)	RA: −1.515±0.325 mas/yr Dec.: −6.910±0.336 mas/yr
Parallax (π)	0.1531±0.2000 mas
Distance	2643+1531 −445 pc

Other designations
- Nova Oph 1919, AAVSO 1809+11, HD 167276

Database references
SIMBAD	data

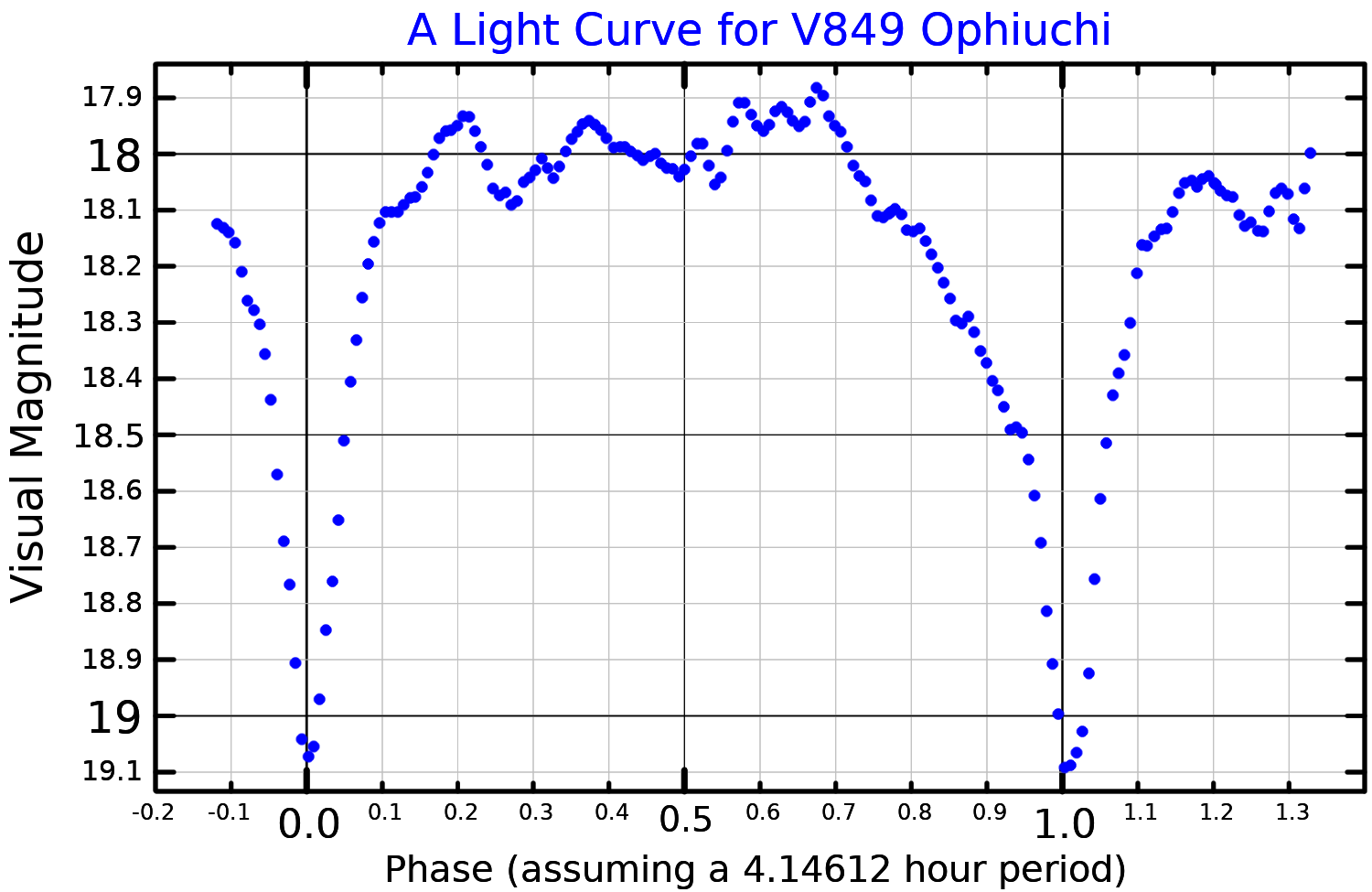
A visual band light curve for a 26 June 1992 eclipse of V849 Ophiuchi. Adapted from Shafter et al. (1993)

V849 Ophiuchi or Nova Ophiuchi 1919 was a nova that erupted in 1919, in the constellation Ophiuchus, and reached a blue band brightness of magnitude 7.2. Joanna C. S. Mackie discovered the star while she was examining Harvard College Observatory photographic plates. The earliest plate it was visible on was exposed on August 20, 1919, when the star was at magnitude 9.4. It reached magnitude 7.5 on September 13 of that year. In its quiescent state it has a visual magnitude of about 18.8. V849 Ophiuchi is classified as a "slow nova"; it took six months for it to fade by three magnitudes.

All novae are binary stars, and V849 is an eclipsing binary. Its orbital period is 4.146128 hours.
