= Nova Cassiopeiae 2021 =

Nova in the constellation Cassiopeia seen in 2021

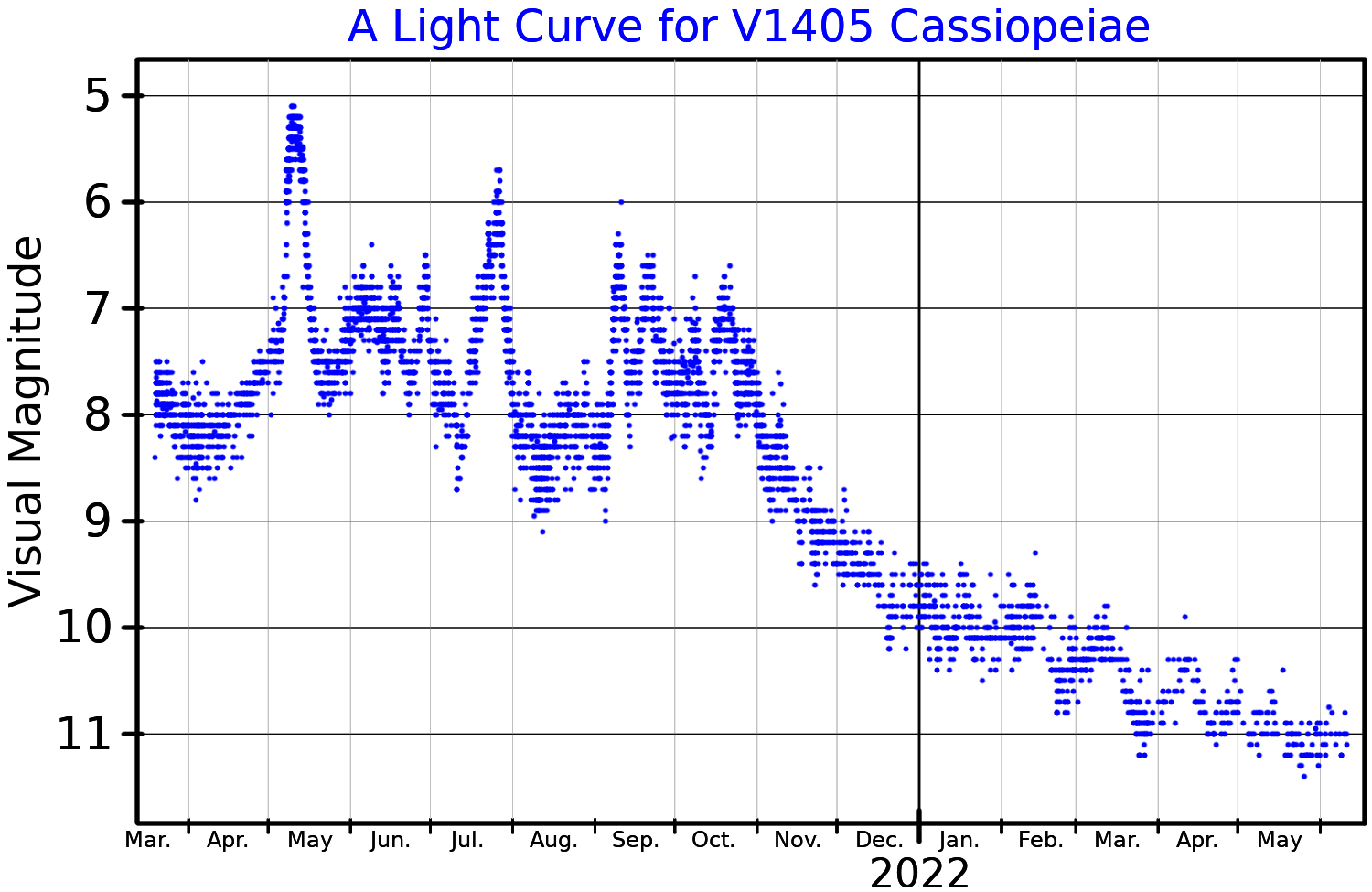
- A visual band light curve for Nova Cassiopeiae 2021, plotted from AAVSO data.

Observation data Epoch J2000.0 Equinox ICRS
- Constellation: Cassiopeia
- Right ascension: 23^{h} 24^{m} 47.73165^{s}
- Declination: +61° 11′ 14.7951″
- Apparent magnitude (V): 5.2 - 15.6

Astrometry
Proper motion (μ)	RA: −0.912±0.026 mas/yr Dec.: −1.319±0.026 mas/yr
Parallax (π)	0.5776±0.0254 mas
Distance	5,600 ± 200 ly (1,730 ± 80 pc)

Characteristics
- Variable type: Nova

Other designations
- V1405 Cas, 2MASS J23244772+6111149, PNV J23244760+6111140

Database references
SIMBAD	data

Nova Cassiopeiae 2021, also known V1405 Cassiopeiae, was a nova in the constellation Cassiopeia. It reached a peak brightness of magnitude 5.449 on May 9, 2021, making it visible to the naked eye. It was discovered by Japanese amateur astronomer Yuji Nakamura of Kameyama, Japan, at 10:10 UT on March 18, 2021. The nova was first seen by Nakamura in four 15 second CCD exposures with a 135mm F/4 lens, when it was at magnitude 9.3. Nothing was seen brighter than magnitude 13.0 with the same equipment in exposures taken at 10:12 UT on March 14, 2021. For the first seven months after discovery, the nova's brightness stayed at a rough plateau, fading and rebrightening at least eight times; it is considered a very slow nova. After the seven month long series of peaks, Nova Cassiopeiae began a linear decline in brightness. This nova has been detected throughout the electromagnetic spectrum, from radio to gamma rays.

All novae are binary stars, consisting of a white dwarf orbiting a "donor star" from which the white dwarf accretes material. Spectra taken of Nova Cassiopeiae around maximum brightness showed that the nova was an FE II type novae. The ejecta from FE II novae is believed to come from a large circumbinary envelope of gas (which was lost from the donor star), rather than the white dwarf. TESS observations revealed an orbital period of 4.52138±0.00012 hours for the binary system.
