= V4743 Sagittarii =

Nova that appeared in 2002

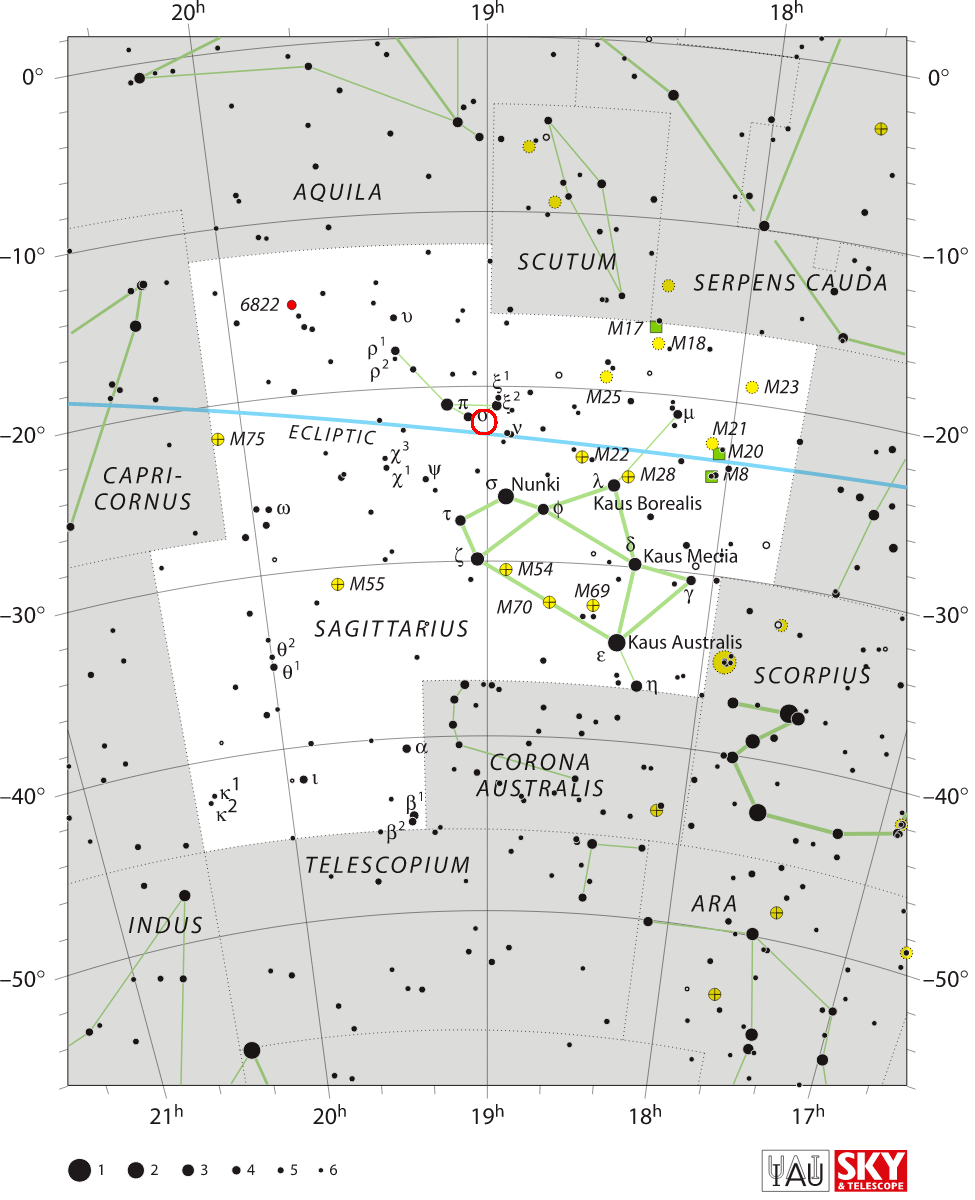
- Location of V4743 Sagittarii (circled in red)

Observation data Epoch J2000.0 Equinox J2000.0 (ICRS)
- Constellation: Sagittarius
- Right ascension: 19^{h} 01^{m} 09.38^{s}
- Declination: −22° 00′ 05.9″
- Apparent magnitude (V): 5.0 – 16.8

Characteristics
- Variable type: CN

Astrometry
Distance	~21,000 ly (6,300 pc)

Details
Mass	1.22 M_{☉}

Other designations
- Nova Sagittarii 2002 c, V4743 Sgr, AAVSO 1855-22

Database references
SIMBAD	data

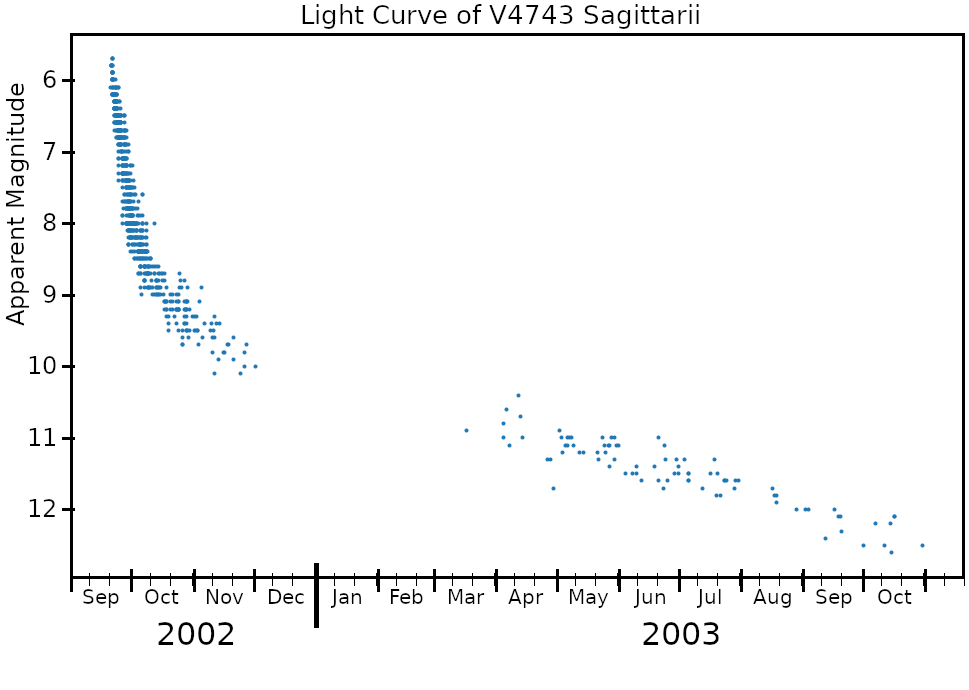
The light curve of V4743 Sagittarii from AAVSO data

V4743 Sagittarii was a bright nova in the southern constellation of Sagittarius. This event was discovered by K. Haseda and colleagues in September 2002. It peaked at magnitude 5.0 on September 20, 2002, making it faintly visible to the naked eye, then declined rapidly thereafter. It reached a peak temperature of 740,000 K around April 2003 and remained at that level for at least five months, suggesting the white dwarf component has a mass of 1.1–1.2 M_{☉}. The distance to this system is uncertain. Infrared observations indicate a distance of approximately 21 kly (6.3 kpc). A derivation using maximum magnitude rate of decay showed a distance of 12.7 ± 1.0 kly (3.9 ± 0.3 kpc).

Observations of the nova by the Chandra X-ray Observatory taken 180 days after the event showed an amplitude variation with a period of about 22 minutes. The X-ray output was dropping rapidly, and changed from a continuous spectrum to one showing emission lines. X-ray light curves of this system show a periodic signal with a frequency of 0.75 MHz that suggests a rapidly rotating magnetic white dwarf in an intermediate polar system. In 2003, an optical variation of 6.74 ± 0.07 hours was observed, and was interpreted as the orbital period of the binary system. A proposed beat period of ~24 minutes has been detected in the optical in between the orbital and period cycles.
