= List of novae in 2018 =

- Host galaxies of novae discovered in 2018
- Milky Way: 15 (30.6%); Andromeda Galaxy: 23 (46.9%); Messier 81: 8 (16.3%); Triangulum Galaxy: 1 (2.0%); Messier 83: 1 (2.0%); NGC 45: 1 (2.0%)

The following is a list of all novae that are known to have occurred in 2018. A nova is an energetic astronomical event caused by a white dwarf accreting matter from a star it is orbiting (typically a red giant, whose outer layers are more weakly attached than smaller, denser stars) Alternatively, novae can rarely be caused by a pair of stars merging with each other, however such events are vastly less common than novae caused by white dwarfs.

In 2018, 15 novae were discovered in the Milky Way, 14 being classical novae, and 1 being a dwarf nova of a previously known variable star, V392 Persei, which was discovered in 1972. An additional 23 novae were discovered in the Andromeda Galaxy, 8 in Messier 81, 1 in the Triangulum Galaxy, and 1 in Messier 83. A single luminous red nova was observed in NGC 45.

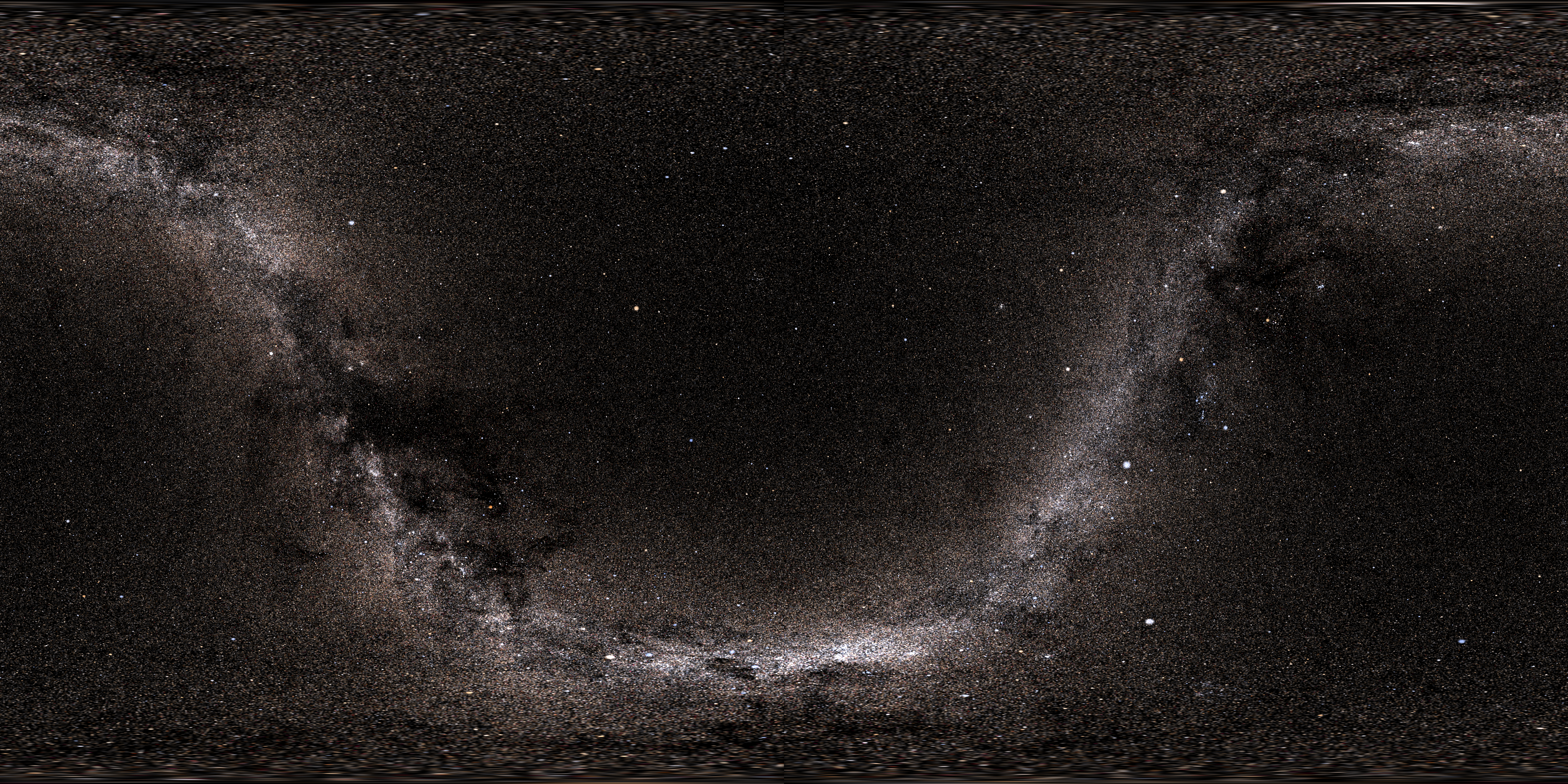
The sky locations of the 15 known galactic novae in 2018. Red dots are classical novae, orange dots are dwarf novae, yellow dots are luminous red novae, and blue dots are recurring novae.

== List of novae in 2018 ==
=== In the Milky Way ===
| Nova name | Discovery date | Constellation | Right ascension | Declination | Peak brightness (v) | Distance (light-years) | Absolute magnitude (v) | Nova type | Origin system identified? | Companion star spectral type (Note: In most cases, the spectral type is estimated based on the absolute magnitude) |
|---|---|---|---|---|---|---|---|---|---|---|
| V357 Muscae | 2018/01/14 | Musca | 11^{h} 26^{m} 15.03^{s} | −65° 31′ 24.3″ | 6.5 | 11500+6900 −3100 | −6.2+0.7 −1.0 | Classical | Yes | F9V/G0V |
| V1661 Scorpii | 2018/01/17 | Scorpius | 17^{h} 18^{m} 06.41^{s} | −32° 04′ 27.2″ | 10.2 | ? | ? | Classical | Yes | ? |
| FM Circini | 2018/01/19 | Circinus | 13^{h} 53^{m} 27.61^{s} | −67° 25′ 00.9″ | 5.9 | 9400+3700 −2100 | −6.4+0.6 −0.7 | Classical | Yes | G1V |
| V1662 Scorpii | 2018/02/06 | Scorpius | 16^{h} 48^{m} 49.64^{s} | −44° 57′ 03.0″ | 10.1 | ? | ? | Classical | Yes | ? |
| V3664 Ophiuchi | 2018/02/12 | Ophiuchus | 17^{h} 24^{m} 39.96^{s} | −24° 21′ 47.4″ | 12.5 | 45000+99999 −28000 | −3.2+2.1 −1.7 | Classical | Yes | M0II/III |
| V1663 Scorpii | 2018/02/24 | Scorpius | 17^{h} 03^{m} 47.51^{s} | −38° 16′ 57.1″ | 12.3 | 3400+99999 −1800 | 2.2+1.6 −7.3 | Classical | Maybe | ? |
| V3665 Ophiuchi | 2018/03/10 | Ophiuchus | 17^{h} 14^{m} 02.55^{s} | −28° 49′ 23.9″ | 9.4 | ? | ? | Classical | Yes | ? |
| V906 Carinae | 2018/03/20 | Carina | 10^{h} 36^{m} 15.43^{s} | −59° 35′ 53.7″ | 5.9 | 22000+99999 −17000 | −8.2+3.7 −3.3 | Classical | Yes | ? |
| V435 Canis Majoris | 2018/03/24 | Canis Major | 07^{h} 13^{m} 45.90^{s} | −21° 12′ 33.0″ | 12.0 | ? | ? | Classical | Maybe | ? |
| V5857 Sagittarii | 2018/04/08 | Sagittarius | 18^{h} 04^{m} 09.45^{s} | −18° 03′ 55.9″ | 10.8 | ? | ? | Classical | Yes | ? |
| V392 Per | 2018/04/29 | Perseus | 04^{h} 43^{m} 21.37^{s} | 47° 21′ 25.9″ | 6.3 | ? | ? | dwarf nova & nova | Yes | ? |
| V408 Lupi | 2018/06/03 | Lupus | 15^{h} 38^{m} 43.86^{s} | −47° 44′ 42.0″ | 9.0 | 2910+1700 −780 | −0.8+0.7 −1.0 | Classical | Maybe | K7V? |
| V613 Scuti | 2018/06/29 | Scutum | 18^{h} 29^{m} 22.96^{s} | −14° 30′ 44.0″ | 10.3 | ? | ? | Classical | Yes | ? |
| V3666 Ophiuchi | 2018/08/08 | Ophiuchus | 17^{h} 42^{m} 24.10^{s} | −20° 53′ 08.8″ | 9.0 | ? | ? | Classical | No | ? |
| V556 Normae | 2018/10/13 | Norma | 16^{h} 14^{m} 32.92^{s} | −53° 30′ 14.7″ | 10.2 | ? | ? | Classical | Yes | ? |

=== In the Andromeda Galaxy ===
Novae are also frequently spotted in the Andromeda Galaxy, and are even slightly more commonly found than in the Milky Way, as there is less intervening dust to prevent their detection. Furthermore, Andromeda is circumpolar for observers north of latitude +48-50, roughly the latitude of the Canadian-American border, allowing observers north of that to search for transients all year.

In 2018, 23 novae were seen in the Andromeda galaxy.

| Nova name | Discovery date | Right ascension | Declination | Peak brightness (v) | Absolute magnitude (v) |
|---|---|---|---|---|---|
| PNV J00444425+4142449 | 2018/01/10 | 00^{h} 44^{m} 44.25^{s} | 41° 42′ 44.9″ | 18.4 | -6.1 |
| PNV J00431577+4118393 | 2018/01/12 | 00^{h} 43^{m} 15.77^{s} | 41° 18′ 39.3″ | 17.8 | -6.7 |
| PNV J00423439+4044255 | 2018/02/07 | 00^{h} 42^{m} 34.39^{s} | 40° 44′ 25.5″ | 16.7 | -7.8 |
| PNV J00415059+4125499 | 2018/02/22 | 00^{h} 41^{m} 50.59^{s} | 41° 25′ 49.9″ | 17.9 | -6.6 |
| PNV J00424041+4112522 | 2018/03/21 | 00^{h} 42^{m} 40.41^{s} | 41° 12′ 52.2″ | 18.1 | -6.4 |
| PNV J00425509+4119009 | 2018/04/03 | 00^{h} 42^{m} 55.09^{s} | 41° 19′ 00.9″ | 17.6 | -6.9 |
| PNV J00421895+4113524 | 2018/04/19 | 00^{h} 42^{m} 18.95^{s} | 41° 13′ 52.4″ | 16.9 | -7.6 |
| PNV J00415353+4114121 | 2018/04/29 | 00^{h} 41^{m} 53.53^{s} | 41° 14′ 12.1″ | 17.5 | -7.0 |
| PNV J00434212+4122349 | 2018/05/19 | 00^{h} 43^{m} 42.12^{s} | 41° 22′ 34.9″ | 17.0 | -7.5 |
| PNV J00424144+4117377 | 2018/06/26 | 00^{h} 42^{m} 41.44^{s} | 41° 17′ 37.7″ | 17.1 | -7.4 |
| PNV J00414889+4109148 | 2018/07/01 | 00^{h} 41^{m} 48.89^{s} | 41° 09′ 14.8″ | 17.4 | -7.1 |
| PNV J00420765+4119438 | 2018/07/12 | 00^{h} 42^{m} 07.65^{s} | 41° 19′ 43.8″ | 17.3 | -7.2 |
| PNV J00425261+4118409 | 2018/07/15 | 00^{h} 42^{m} 52.61^{s} | 41° 18′ 40.9″ | 18.6 | -5.9 |
| PNV J00425074+4115461 | 2018/07/31 | 00^{h} 42^{m} 50.74^{s} | 41° 15′ 46.1″ | 19.1 | -5.4 |
| PNV J00424214+4114457 | 2018/08/02 | 00^{h} 42^{m} 42.14^{s} | 41° 14′ 45.7″ | 17.5 | -7.0 |
| PNV J00392190+4015488 | 2018/08/13 | 00^{h} 39^{m} 21.90^{s} | 40° 15′ 48.8″ | 19.0 | -5.5 |
| PNV J00451587+4210269 | 2018/08/21 | 00^{h} 45^{m} 15.87^{s} | 42° 10′ 26.9″ | 17.9 | -6.6 |
| PNV J00424990+4123348 | 2018/10/11 | 00^{h} 42^{m} 49.90^{s} | 41° 23′ 34.8″ | 17.9 | -6.6 |
| PNV J00424012+4117273 | 2018/10/13 | 00^{h} 42^{m} 40.12^{s} | 41° 17′ 27.3″ | 17.5 | -7.0 |
| TCP J00420310+4102331 | 2018/10/15 | 00^{h} 42^{m} 03.10^{s} | 41° 02′ 33.1″ | 18.0 | -6.5 |
| PNV J00424065+4111080 | 2018/12/03 | 00^{h} 42^{m} 40.65^{s} | 41° 11′ 08.0″ | 18.7 | -5.8 |
| PNV J00424241+4119411 | 2018/12/17 | 00^{h} 42^{m} 42.41^{s} | 41° 19′ 41.1″ | 18.2 | -6.3 |
| PNV J00432462+4120222 | 2018/12/22 | 00^{h} 43^{m} 24.62^{s} | 41° 20′ 22.2″ | 18.0 | -6.5 |
| PNV J00424380+4117208 | 2018/12/23 | 00^{h} 42^{m} 43.80^{s} | 41° 17′ 20.8″ | 17.5 | -7.0 |

=== In other galaxies ===
Any galaxy within 20 million light-years of the Sun could theoretically have nova events bright enough to be detected from Earth, although in practice most are only detected in galaxies within 10-15 million light-years of the Milky Way, such as the Triangulum Galaxy, Messier 81, Messier 82, Messier 83, and Messier 94.

In 2018, of the ten novae observed in other galaxies than the Milky Way or the Andromeda Galaxy, eight were in Messier 81, with the remaining two from the Triangulum Galaxy and Messier 83. A luminous red nova, probably caused by the merger of two stars, occurred in NGC 45.

| Nova name | Discovery date | Host galaxy | Right ascension | Declination | Peak brightness (v) | Distance (million light-years) | Absolute magnitude (v) | Type |
|---|---|---|---|---|---|---|---|---|
| PNV J13370978-2956576 | 2018/01/28 | Messier 83 | 13^{h} 37^{m} 09.78^{s} | −29° 56′ 57.6″ | 20.7 | 15.2 | -7.6 | Classical |
| PNV J09555926+6903517 | 2018/01/30 | Messier 81 | 09^{h} 55^{m} 59.26^{s} | 69° 03′ 51.7″ | 20.3 | 11.5 | -7.4 | Classical |
| PNV J09545236+6904085 | 2018/02/19 | Messier 81 | 09^{h} 54^{m} 52.36^{s} | 69° 04′ 08.5″ | 20.0 | 11.5 | -7.7 | Classical |
| PNV J09553607+6902141 | 2018/03/06 | Messier 81 | 09^{h} 55^{m} 36.07^{s} | 69° 02′ 14.1″ | 20.8 | 11.5 | -6.9 | Classical |
| PNV J09551340+6900478 | 2018/03/20 | Messier 81 | 09^{h} 55^{m} 13.40^{s} | 69° 00′ 47.8″ | 21.2 | 11.5 | -6.5 | Classical |
| PNV J09553194+6909147 | 2018/04/02 | Messier 81 | 09^{h} 55^{m} 31.94^{s} | 69° 09′ 14.7″ | 20.4 | 11.5 | -7.3 | Classical |
| PNV J09555269+6858409 | 2018/04/09 | Messier 81 | 09^{h} 55^{m} 52.69^{s} | 68° 58′ 40.9″ | 20.6 | 11.5 | -7.1 | Classical |
| AT 2018bwo | 2018/05/22 | NGC 45 | 00^{h} 14^{m} 01.72^{s} | −23° 11′ 35.8″ | 16.4 | 32.6 | -13.6 | Luminous Red Nova |
| PNV J09560988+6859108 | 2018/10/12 | Messier 81 | 09^{h} 56^{m} 09.88^{s} | 68° 59′ 10.8″ | 20.1 | 11.5 | -7.6 | Classical |
| PNV J01334673+3032181 | 2018/10/13 | Triangulum Galaxy | 01^{h} 33^{m} 46.73^{s} | 30° 32′ 18.1″ | 18.1 | 2.65 | -6.4 | Classical |
| PNV J09555246+6902009 | 2018/11/06 | Messier 81 | 09^{h} 55^{m} 52.46^{s} | 69° 02′ 00.9″ | 20.0 | 11.5 | -7.7 | Classical |

== See also ==
- List of novae in the Milky Way galaxy
- List of novae in 2019
- Nova
- Dwarf nova
- Luminous red nova
- Guest star (astronomy)
- Supernova
