= V1017 Sagittarii =

Star in the constellation Sagittarius

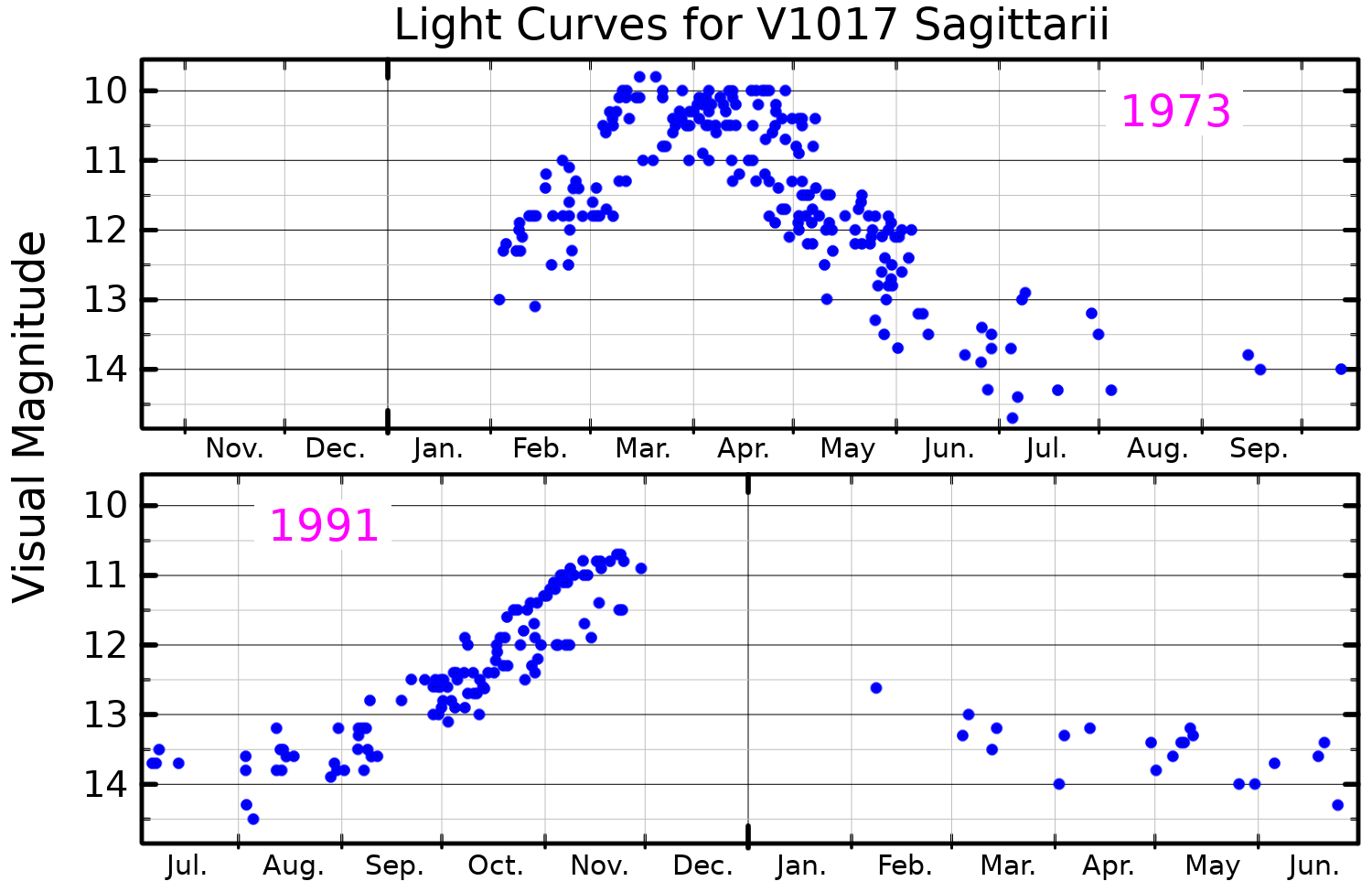
- Visual band light curves for the 1973 and 1991 eruptions of V1017 Sagittarii, adapted from Salazar et al. (2017)

Observation data Epoch J2000 Equinox ICRS
- Constellation: Sagittarius
- Right ascension: 18^{h} 32^{m} 04.4738^{s}
- Declination: −29° 23′ 12.594″
- Apparent magnitude (V): 4.5±2 Max. 13.5 Min.

Characteristics
- Spectral type: G5IIIp / white dwarf
- B−V color index: 0.39
- Variable type: eclipsing recurrent nova (NR+E)

Astrometry
Radial velocity (R_{v})	15 km/s
Proper motion (μ)	RA: 5.241±0.086 mas/yr Dec.: −10.392±0.066 mas/yr
Parallax (π)	0.7892±0.0437 mas
Distance	1269+84 −60 pc
Absolute magnitude (M_{V})	+1.6

Orbit
Primary	white dwarf
Name	giant star
Semi-major axis (a)	16.1 R_{☉}
Eccentricity (e)	0 (assumed)
Inclination (i)	80+10 −8°

Details

white dwarf
Mass	1.1+0.03 −0.1 M_{☉}

giant star
Mass	0.60-0.79 M_{☉}
Radius	5.3 R_{☉}
Luminosity	18.5 (Note: Derived from given radius and temperature of star.) L_{☉}
Temperature	5200 K

Other designations
- Nova Sagittarii 1919, AAVSO 1825-29, 2MASS J18320447-2923125, Gaia DR2 4048251562703375488

Database references
SIMBAD	data

V1017 Sagittarii is a cataclysmic variable star system in the constellation Sagittarius. Ida E. Woods discovered the star on Harvard College Observatory photographic plates, in 1919. During that eruption, the star reached magnitude 7. Its other eruptions in 1901, 1973 and 1991 only reached magnitude 10, leading it to be reclassified from a recurrent nova to a dwarf nova.

After the eruption of 1919, the orbital period of the binary system has decreased by 0.0273±0.0061%, to the 5.786290±0.000032 days. Physical models cannot explain the orbital change of such sign and magnitude as in 2019.
