= Richard Huziak =

Canadian astronomer

- Born: March 18, 1957 (age 69); Yorkton, Saskatchewan, Canada
- Education: University of Saskatchewan
- Occupations: amateur astronomer, manufacturing engineering technologist, environmentalist

Richard Huziak (born March 18, 1957) is a Canadian amateur astronomer. The International Astronomical Union named main-belt asteroid 4143 Huziak after him. A former president of the Royal Astronomical Society of Canada Saskatoon Centre for six years and a prominent member of the American Association of Variable Star Observers, Huziak has over 181,000 observations of variable stars to his credit. He received the Chant Medal from the Royal Astronomical Society of Canada in 2001, the Service Medal from the same organization in 2009, and Janet Mattei presented Huziak with the AAVSO's Director's Award in 2003.

== Biography ==
Born in Yorkton, Saskatchewan, Huziak attended elementary and high school in Yorkton, but moved to Saskatoon in 1976 to attend the University of Saskatchewan. He has resided in Saskatoon since, working as a manufacturing engineering technologist for Develcon Electronics, Joytec, International Road Dynamics and SED Systems.

Huziak is an environmentalist addressing light pollution concerns in Saskatchewan. His work here prompted the Saskatchewan Eco-Network (SEN) to name Huziak a Saskatchewan Environmental Champion. That organization awarded him the Environmental Activist Individual Award in 2007. He was instrumental in the designation of the Cypress Hills Dark Sky Preserve in September 2004, then Canada's largest dark-sky preserve. His work with Parks Canada led to the designation of Grasslands National Park as a dark-sky preserve in October 2009, overtaking Cypress Hills as Canada's then-largest dark-sky preserve. Huziak continues to advise various levels of government and organizations on light pollution abatement to reduce light trespass, energy waste, and environmental degradation. In August 2021, Huziak was nominated by the Canadian Space Agency as Canada's amateur astronomer representative to the International Astronomical Union and was accepted as an Honorary Member.

Huziak was present during the discovery of 185P/Comet Petriew in August 2001, namesake of Vance Petriew of the Regina Centre, RASC, and was the first to the recognize the object discovered as a comet.
