= Cyril G. Wates =

Cyril G. Wates (18 July 1883 – 2 February 1946) was an author, mountain climber, and amateur astronomer who lived in Edmonton, Alberta, Canada.

== Biography ==
Wates was born in Brixton, England, graduated from Worcester Academy in 1902, and immigrated to Edmonton, Alberta, Canada, in 1909 where he worked for the City of Edmonton Municipal Telephone System as an engineer. He joined the Alpine Club of Canada in 1916, and climbed more than fifty peaks. He was the first to ascend Mt. Geikie in the Canadian Rockies, named Mt. Minotaur located in British Columbia, south of Geikie Creek, and was responsible for the Alpine Club's book, Songs for Canadian Climbers. Wates served as president of the Club from 1938 to 1941 and oversaw the construction of a cabin in the Tonquin Valley in Jasper National Park in Alberta, that is now known as the Wates-Gibson Hut. He received a Fellowship in the Royal Canadian Geographical Society in 1939.

Wates was an accomplished amateur astronomer who served as president of Edmonton Centre of the Royal Astronomical Society of Canada. He also wrote for academic journals and magazines such as Scientific American and the RASC Journal, and was awarded the Chant Medal of the Royal Astronomical Society of Canada; "for outstanding amateur contribution to astronomy in Canada" in 1943. The year before, Wates had built a 12.5 in (320 mm) reflector telescope that he donated to the University of Alberta for their future observatory. The University now offers the Cyril G. Wates Memorial Prize and Scholarship for mathematics.

Wates' first story, "The Visitation", was published in 1927 in Amazing Stories as winner of the $500 Cover Prize Contest. Although his last published piece appeared in 1930, his letters appeared in the magazine until 1935.

== Short stories and novellas ==
- (1927) "The Visitation", Amazing Stories, June ISBN 978-1539561224
- (1929) "The Face of Isis", Amazing Stories, March
- (1929) "Gold Dust and Star Dust", Amazing Stories, September
- (1930) "A Modern Prometheus", Amazing Stories Quarterly, Fall
- (1930) Letter (Amazing Stories, February)
- (1934) Letter (Amazing Stories, January)
- (1935) Letter (Amazing Stories, August)

== Non-fiction works ==
- (1919) "The Alpine Club of Canada", Toronto World, September 9
- (1930) "The memorial cabin on Penstock Creek", Canadian Alpine Journal
- (1933) and E.R. Gibson, "The Eremite and beyond", Canadian Alpine Journal
- (1937) "Following the footsteps of the fur traders", Canadian Alpine Journal
- (1942) "Space, time and meaning", Journal of the Royal Astronomical Society of Canada, Volume 36, September
- (1944) "Adjusting the Polar Axis", Journal of the Royal Astronomical Society of Canada, Vol. 38, p. 154, April
- (1944) "Edmonton Observations of an Occultation of Jupiter", Journal of the Royal Astronomical Society of Canada, Vol. 38, p. 171, April
