= Ruth J. Northcott =

Canadian astronomer

- Ruth J. Northcott, from a 1962 newspaper photograph.
- Born: March 6, 1913; Solina, Ontario
- Died: July 29, 1969 (aged 56)
- Education: University of Toronto
- Occupation: astronomer

Ruth Josephine Northcott (March 6, 1913 – July 29, 1969) was a Canadian astronomer based at the David Dunlap Observatory, and president of the Royal Astronomical Society of Canada from 1962 to 1964. Asteroid 3670 Northcott is named for her.

== Early life ==
Ruth Josephine Northcott was born in Solina, Ontario. She attended the University of Toronto, graduating in 1934, and earning a master's degree in 1935.

== Career ==
When the David Dunlap Observatory opened in 1935, Ruth Northcott was part of the starting staff, initially as a research assistant. She later held the rank of Lecturer, and then Associate Professor of Astronomy. She was elected to membership in the International Astronomical Union in 1952, and served on the IAU's committee on the history of astronomy. She was also an active member of the American Association of Variable Star Observers, and she helped to found the Richmond Hill Naturalists.

She was especially active in the Royal Astronomical Society of Canada (RASC), serving as president of the Toronto Centre during World War II, and as third woman elected president of the national society, in 1962 and 1963, and as a member of the executive committee from 1965. She was assistant editor of the Journal of the Royal Astronomical Society of Canada beginning in 1951, and became the journal's editor in 1956. She won the RASC Service Award in 1967. She was editor of RASC's The Observer's Handbook (1968), a manual for amateur astronomers, and Astronomy in Canada: Yesterday, Today and Tomorrow (1967).

Her research involved variable stars, binary stars, and spectroscopy, but she wrote on a variety of topics for the RASC journal, including "The Visibility of the Planet Mercury" (1965). "I get a great deal of pleasure and a certain degree of excitement from investigating the stars," she told a Winnipeg newspaper in 1962.

== Personal life ==
Ruth J. Northcott died in 1969, aged 56 years. Fellow astronomer Helen Sawyer Hogg was executor of Northcott's estate. Many of Northcott's papers and photographs are in the University of Toronto Archives. There is a biennial Ruth Northcott Memorial Lecture presented by RASC. Asteroid 3670 Northcott, discovered in 1983, is named for her.
