= List of novae in 2019 =

- Host galaxies of novae discovered in 2018
- Milky Way: 16 (51.6%); Andromeda Galaxy: 11 (35.5%); Messier 81: 2 (6.5%); Triangulum Galaxy: 1 (3.2%); Whirlpool Galaxy: 1 (3.2%)

The following is a list of all novae that are known to have occurred in 2019. A nova is an energetic astronomical event caused by a white dwarf accreting matter from a star it is orbiting (typically a red giant, whose outer layers are more weakly attached than smaller, denser stars) Alternatively, novae can be caused by a pair of stars merging with each other, however such events are vastly less common than novae caused by white dwarfs.

In 2019, at least sixteen Milky Way novae were discovered, eight of which were dwarf nova eruptions, one of the variable system V386 Serpentis, one from the known nova-like system 2E 1516.6-6827, and four from previously unidentified white dwarf binaries. One of these binaries, TCP J18200437-1033071, may have possibly been involved in another outburst in 1951. The recurrent nova V3890 Sgr, which had been seen to erupt in 1962 and 1990, also erupted again in 2019.

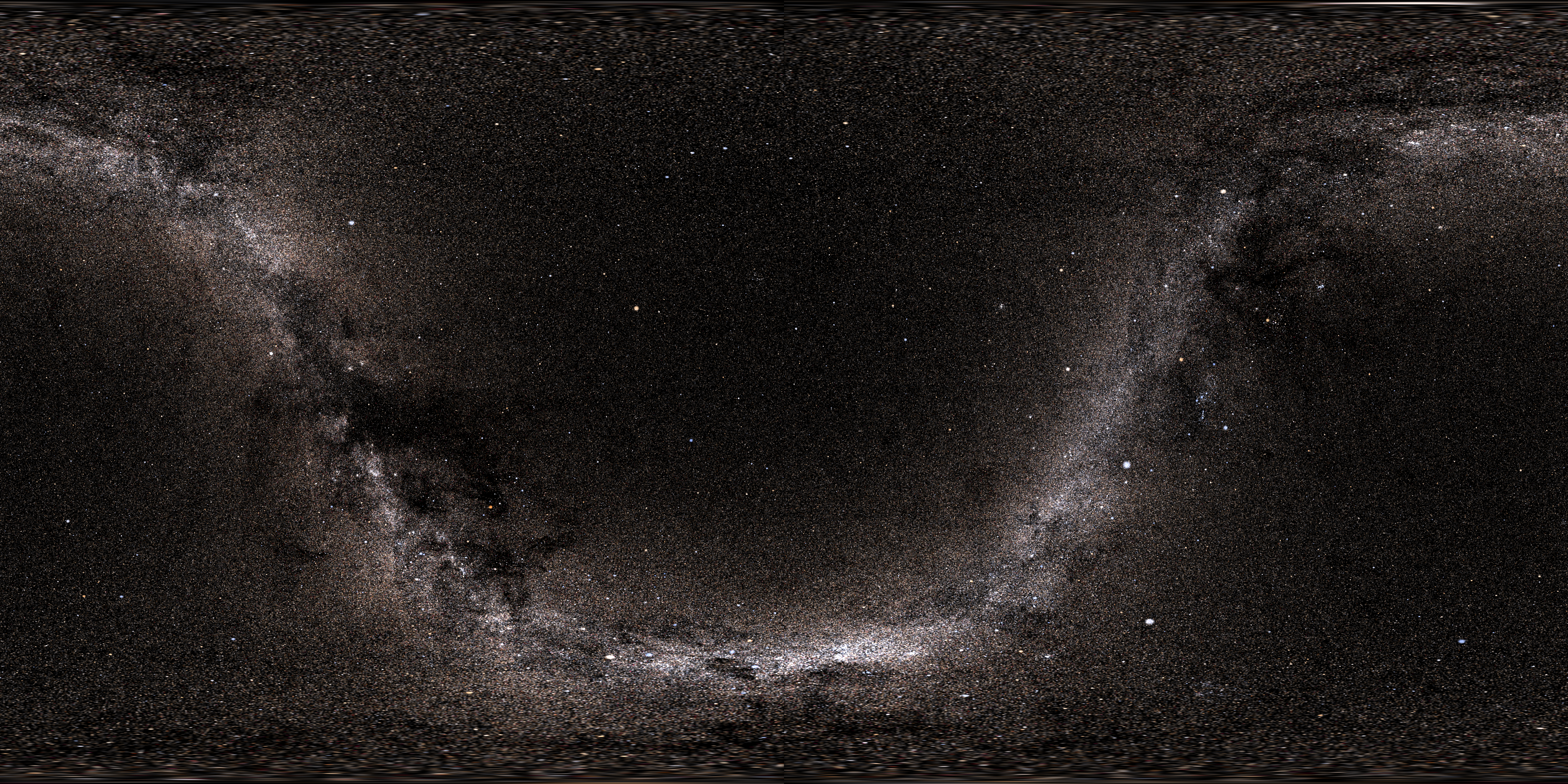
The sky locations of the known galactic novae in 2019. Red dots are classical novae, orange dots are dwarf novae, yellow dots are luminous red novae, and blue dots are recurring novae.

== List of novae in 2019 ==
=== In the Milky Way ===
Nova name	Discovery date	Constellation	Right ascension	Declination	Peak Brightness (v)	Distance (light years)	Absolute magnitude (v)	Nova type	Origin system identified?	Companion star spectral type (Note: In most cases, the spectral type is estimated based on the absolute magnitude)
V386 Serpentis	2019/01/18	Serpens	16^{h} 10^{m} 33.63^{s}	−01° 02′ 23.2″	10.4	785+77 −64	3.5+0.2 −0.2	Dwarf nova	Yes	White dwarf
TCP J06373299-0935420	2019/02/21	Monoceros	06^{h} 37^{m} 33.01^{s}	−09° 35′ 42.2″	10.4	1200+230 −170	2.6+0.3 −0.4	Dwarf nova	Yes	White dwarf
TCP J05390410+4748030	2019/03/14	Auriga	05^{h} 39^{m} 04.09^{s}	47° 48′ 00.9″	11.3	1060+220 −150	3.7+0.4 −0.4	Dwarf nova	Yes	White dwarf
TCP J05515391+6504346	2019/04/01	Camelopardalis	05^{h} 51^{m} 53.87^{s}	65° 04′ 36.9″	13.2	3000+20000 −1600	3.3+1.6 −4.3	Dwarf nova	Yes	White dwarf
TCP J18325790-1642211	2019/04/02	Sagittarius	18^{h} 32^{m} 58.30^{s}	−16° 42′ 17.6″	12.5	99999+70000 −99999	−4.9+2.6 −1.5	Classical	Yes	K5III
TCP J18200437-1033071	2019/04/08	Serpens	18^{h} 20^{m} 04.21^{s}	−10° 33′ 08.7″	13.3	10000+5000 −5000	0.9+1.5 −0.9	Dwarf nova	Yes	White dwarf
PNV J15212688-6838261	2019/05/11	Triangulum Australe	15^{h} 21^{m} 26.84^{s}	−68° 38′ 26.6″	13.6	3250+420 −330	3.6+0.2 −0.3	Dwarf nova	Yes	K?V
AT 2019fez	2019/05/13	Scorpius	17^{h} 07^{m} 34.19^{s}	−36° 08′ 21.3″	13.1	?	?	Classical	No	?
TCP J10240289+4808512	2019/05/25	Ursa Major	10^{h} 24^{m} 02.70^{s}	48° 08′ 51.0″	11.8	1090+380 −300	4.2+0.2 −0.3	Dwarf nova	Yes	White dwarf
V2860 Ori	2019/08/07	Orion	06^{h} 09^{m} 57.45^{s}	12° 12′ 25.2″	9.4	?	?	Classical	?	?
V569 Vul	2019/08/18	Vulpecula	19^{h} 52^{m} 08.25^{s}	27° 42′ 20.9″	13.3	?	?	Classical	?	?
V3890 Sgr	2019/08/27	Sagittarius	18^{h} 30^{m} 43.29^{s}	−24° 01′ 08.9″	7.1	?	?	Recurrent	Yes	Red Giant
Gaia19edn	2019/09/14	Ophiuchus	17^{h} 38^{m} 31.82^{s}	−29° 03′ 47.1″	12.3	?	?	Classical	?	?
V1707 Sco	2019/09/15	Scorpius	17^{h} 37^{m} 09.54^{s}	−35° 10′ 23.2″	11.7	?	?	Classical	?	?
V2891 Cyg	2019/09/17	Cygnus	21^{h} 09^{m} 25.53^{s}	48° 10′ 52.2″	14.3	?	?	Classical	Yes	?
V659 Sct	2019/10/29	Scutum	18^{h} 39^{m} 59.70^{s}	−10° 25′ 41.9″	8.36	?	?	Classical	?	?

=== In the Andromeda Galaxy ===
Novae are also frequently spotted in the Andromeda Galaxy, and are even slightly more commonly found than in the Milky Way, as there is less intervening dust to prevent their detection. Furthermore, Andromeda is circumpolar for observers north of latitude +48-50, roughly the latitude of the Canadian-American border, allowing observers north of that to search for transients all year.

In 2019, 11 novae have been seen in the Andromeda galaxy.

Nova name	Discovery date	Right ascension	Declination	Peak brightness (v)	Absolute magnitude (v)
PNV J00420290+4107142	2019/01/20	00^{h} 42^{m} 02.90^{s}	41° 07′ 14.2″	18.2	-6.3
PNV J00424503+4114248	2019/01/21	00^{h} 42^{m} 45.03^{s}	41° 14′ 24.8″	18.0	-6.5
PNV J00430008+4118340	2019/01/23	00^{h} 43^{m} 00.08^{s}	41° 18′ 34.0″	19.5	-5.0
PNV J00422916+4114013	2019/01/27	00^{h} 42^{m} 29.16^{s}	41° 14′ 01.3″	19.6	-4.9
PNV J00435457+4117330	2019/01/28	00^{h} 43^{m} 54.57^{s}	41° 17′ 33.0″	17.5	-7.0
PNV J00425100+4121038	2019/02/03	00^{h} 42^{m} 51.00^{s}	41° 21′ 03.8″	18.8	-5.7
PNV J00421999+4113225	2019/03/13	00^{h} 42^{m} 19.99^{s}	41° 13′ 22.5″	18.8	-5.7
PNV J00423396+4113577	2019/04/16	00^{h} 42^{m} 33.96^{s}	41° 13′ 57.7″	17.3	-7.2
PNV J00424174+4116263	2019/04/26	00^{h} 42^{m} 41.74^{s}	41° 16′ 26.3″	16.6	-7.9
PNV J00422198+4123584	2019/05/24	00^{h} 42^{m} 21.98^{s}	41° 23′ 58.4″	16.7	-7.8
PNV J00432058+4125426	2019/05/28	00^{h} 43^{m} 20.58^{s}	41° 25′ 42.6″	17.4	-7.1

=== In other galaxies ===
Any galaxy within 20 million light-years of the Sun could theoretically have nova events bright enough to be detected from Earth, although in practice most are only detected in galaxies within 10-15 million light-years of the Milky Way, such as the Triangulum Galaxy, Messier 81, Messier 82, Messier 83, and Messier 94.

In 2019, two novae were observed in Messier 81, and another in the Triangulum Galaxy. A luminous red nova was observed in the Whirlpool Galaxy (Messier 51a), probably caused by a merger of two stars.

Nova name	Discovery date	Host galaxy	Right ascension	Declination	Peak brightness (v)	Distance (million light-years)	Absolute magnitude (v)	Type
AT 2019gc	2019/01/06	Triangulum Galaxy	01^{h} 33^{m} 56.94^{s}	30° 32′ 32.6″	17.0	2.65	-7.5	Classical
AT 2019abn	2019/01/22	Whirlpool Galaxy	13^{h} 29^{m} 42.39^{s}	47° 11′ 16.9″	16.9	23	-12.3	Luminous Red Nova
PNV J09555100+6902323	2019/04/14	Messier 81	09^{h} 55^{m} 51.00^{s}	69° 02′ 32.3″	19.8	11.5	-7.9	Classical
PNV J09554664+6902473	2019/06/09	Messier 81	09^{h} 55^{m} 46.64^{s}	69° 02′ 47.3″	19.1	11.5	-8.6	Classical

== See also ==
- List of novae in 2018
- Nova
- Dwarf nova
- Luminous red nova
- Guest star (astronomy)
- Supernova
