= Martha Locke Hazen =

American astronomer

- Born: 15 July 1931
- Died: 23 December 2006 (age 75)
- Education: Mount Holyoke College, University of Michigan
- Spouse(s): William Liller, Bruce McHenry
- Scientific career
- Fields: Astronomy
- Workplaces: Harvard University
- Thesis: The Distribution of Intensity of Elliptical Galaxies of the Virgo Cluster
- Doctoral advisor: Cornelis van Schooneveld

Martha Locke Hazen (15 July 1931- 23 December 2006) was an American astronomer, best known for her contributions as curator of the Harvard astronomical photographs collection and her work on variable stars.

== Early life and education ==
Martha Locke Hazen was born in Cambridge, Massachusetts and grew up in Belmont. In 1953, she graduated from Mount Holyoke College with a degree in astronomy. She went on to complete her Ph.D. at the University of Michigan in 1958. Her thesis foscused on how the intensities of elliptical galaxies within the Virgo cluster were distributed.

== Research and career ==
Martha was a research fellow at Harvard College Observatory, observing in Chile for 3 weeks every year. In 1969, she became the curator of astronomical photographs at Harvard where she was responsible for the Harvard Plate Archives and she assumed this role until her retirement in 2002. She was also had a leadership role in improving the status of women in university life at Harvard, serving as the Harvard College Observatory representative on Harvard's committee dedicated to this. As part of her role she helped organise the first Space for Women conference in 1975. Additionally, she helped remove gender bias from the bylaws of American Astronomical Society.

Martha joined the American Association of Variable Star Observers (AAVSO) in 1975 and was elected as a member of the AAVSO council in 1984. She acted as a vice president before becoming president of the association in 1992. She went on to take the role of secretary in 1993 and remained in the role for 10 years.

The Minor Planet Center at Smithsonian Astrophysical Observatory named an asteroid (asteroid number: 10,024), Marthahazen, in recognition of Martha's contributions to astronomy.

== Personal life ==
Martha married William Liller in 1959 and they had two children together, John Liller and Hillary Ward. Martha and William divorced in 1982 and she married her second husband Bruce McHenry in 1991.

== Awards ==
- 37th AAVSO Merit Award.

== Notable publications ==
- Martha L Hazen; James M Nemen. (July 1992). " Variable Stars Within 25 Arcmin of the LMC Globular Cluster NGC 2210". Astronomical Journal. 104: 111. doi: 10.1086/116224
- M L Hazen-Liller. (September 1985). "The variable stars in the field of the globular cluster NGC 6569". Astronomical Journal. 90: 1807–1811.doi:10.1086/113881
