= Lee Anne Willson =

American astronomer

Lee Anne Willson (born 1947) is an American astronomer.

== Early life and education ==
Lee Anne Willson (nee Mordy) was born on March 14, 1947, in Honolulu, Hawaii. Willson was interested in science from an early age. The daughter of a scientist, she spent her youth reading science fiction books. Her junior year of high school, she wanted to be an astronaut but she realized that this dream was impractical because she had poor vision, a crooked knee, and was female. Because she still wanted to learn about space, she decided that she wanted to be an astronomer instead.

Willson received her bachelor's degree in physics from Harvard University in 1968 where she learned that perseverance was almost as important as knowledge. Willson wanted to take an advanced physics course, which the professor strongly advised against because she was female. Her response to the professor was, "I'll see you in class on Monday". From 1968-1969, she studied in Stockholm as a Fulbright scholar as well as an American-Scandinavian Foundation scholar.

Willson attended the University of Michigan for graduate school where she received a master's degree in astronomy in 1970 and a PhD in astronomy in 1973. While in graduate school, she gave a seminar on Mira variables. Her research on them became very in-depth and she continued to research them as she took a position at Iowa State University.

== Career and achievements ==
In 1973, Willson was employed by Iowa State. Willson's tenure-track position at Iowa State was not fully accepted by department members outside of the astronomy group, because many of them assumed she followed her husband into teaching to keep busy. She decided to keep working towards improving the astronomy program at Iowa State. Willson worked with another scientist, Steven Hill, and together they theorized that Mira stars pulsated a certain way. While this theory contradicted all others, it was a commonly accepted idea ten years later. Recently, she has been researching if main-sequence stars lose mass while pulsating. She has held other positions in academia including being a visiting fellow at the Canadian Institute for Theoretical Astrophysics in 1985 and a visiting astronomer at Cambridge University in 2007. She has also been a visiting professor at Uppsala University in 1991 and 2003-2004, the University of Minnesota in 1991 and 2003-2004, and the Center for Astrophysics | Harvard & Smithsonian from 2003-2004.

Willson has spent almost 20 years with the American Astronomical Society, being part of the council (1993-1996), the publication board (2006-2010), and vice president (2009-2012). Through October 2004, she served as a council member of the American Association of Variable Star Observers for 4 terms, a senior vice president for 2 terms, president for 2 years, and an ex-president for 2 years. Willson was also on the board of directors of the Association of Universities for Research in Astronomy from 1989-2002. She has received many awards including the Annie Jump Cannon award in 1980 and the 40th Merit Award from the American Association of Variable Star Observers in 2008. She is also a very strong proponent of women in science.

She was elected a Legacy Fellow of the American Astronomical Society in 2020.

== Personal life ==
On July 19, 1969, she married Stephen J. Willson, a mathematics professor at Iowa State. Together they have two children, Kendra and Jeffrey. Willson's interests include learning foreign languages, figure skating, and art. She served as the president of the Ames Figure Skating Club for about five years. Since 1995, she has been making origami "paper quilts" and has shown interest in other types of modular origami.
