= Carolyn Hurless =

American astronomer

- Born: November 24, 1934; Lima, Ohio, US
- Died: February 13, 1987 (aged 52)
- Spouse: Don Hurless
- Scientific career
- Fields: Astronomy
- Institutions: American Association of Variable Star Observers (AAVSO)

Carolyn Hurless (November 24, 1934 – February 13, 1987) was an American astronomer and an American Association of Variable Star Observers merit award winner. She made an estimated 78,876 astronomical observations in her lifetime.

== Life ==
Carolyn Hurless was born in Lima, Ohio on November 24, 1934 to Frank R. Klaserner and Charlotte Jane Foster Klaserner. At the age of 13, she started to take an interest in astronomy through her love of science fiction. She was invited to join the Lima Astronomy Club by the club president, Herbert Speer, after he saw her name on astronomy books checked out from the library. Soon afterwards, Hurless made her own 8-inch reflector telescope, which had a very short focal length and a compact tube assembly with a simple mounting that could be easily moved. She referred to her telescope as "feminine" because of its ease of transport. Many of her observations were made with this very telescope. Around the same time, Hurless started to study under AAVSO observer, Leslie Peltier. Hurless passed on Peltier's knowledge to other astronomers by becoming a mentor and by writing monthly newsletters. Eventually, she published her own newsletter, Variable Views, for 22 years. She also was a councilor for AAVSO for two years, and a 2nd Vice President of the council for six years.

== Astronomical Observations ==
Hurless's main interest was tracing out minimums in light curves of LPV's that were below a magnitude of 14. These observations were nicknamed "inner sanctum" observations and were the focus of her monthly newsletter. She contributed observations to a paper published by Bornhurst on differences between light curves of individual star eclipses. Hurless, along with Peltier, Cragg, Ford, and Bornhurst made 767 observations of 29 individual eclipses, which were then compiled into a composite phase plot. The data suggested a "reflection effect observed rarely before primary eclipse and the indication of a double minimum often suspected during the eclipse". Hurless advocated for a trick she called "heavy breathing" in an effort to detect very faint variable stars, which she learned from her mentor, Leslie Peltier. The technique consisted of hyperventilating through the nose before putting the eye to the telescope eyepiece. This would cause a rush of oxygen to the brain and eyes, affecting enhanced alertness. Then, while scanning the field, breathing should slow, still through the nose, until focusing on a target, when breath should again speed up.

Aside from those involving light curves, many of Hurless' contributions throughout her career dealt with the discovery and observation of variable stars, a status that categorizes stars whose visibility varies based on either the brilliance of the star itself (intrinsic) or on the amount of emitted visible light that reaches Earth's atmosphere (extrinsic). Her first variable observation captured SS Cygni, a dwarf nova star in the constellation Cygnus.

Dwarf novae are a class of intrinsic variable stars of the cataclysmic variety, meaning their brilliance changes as a result of the fluctuating nature of the energy generated by thermonuclear interactions. Since SS Cyg's discovery in 1896, it has undergone an estimated 800 cataclysmic outbursts. Hurless observed one such outburst in 1959 under the guidance of Peltier with a considerably large magnitude of 8.1-12.0.

== Variable Views Newsletter ==
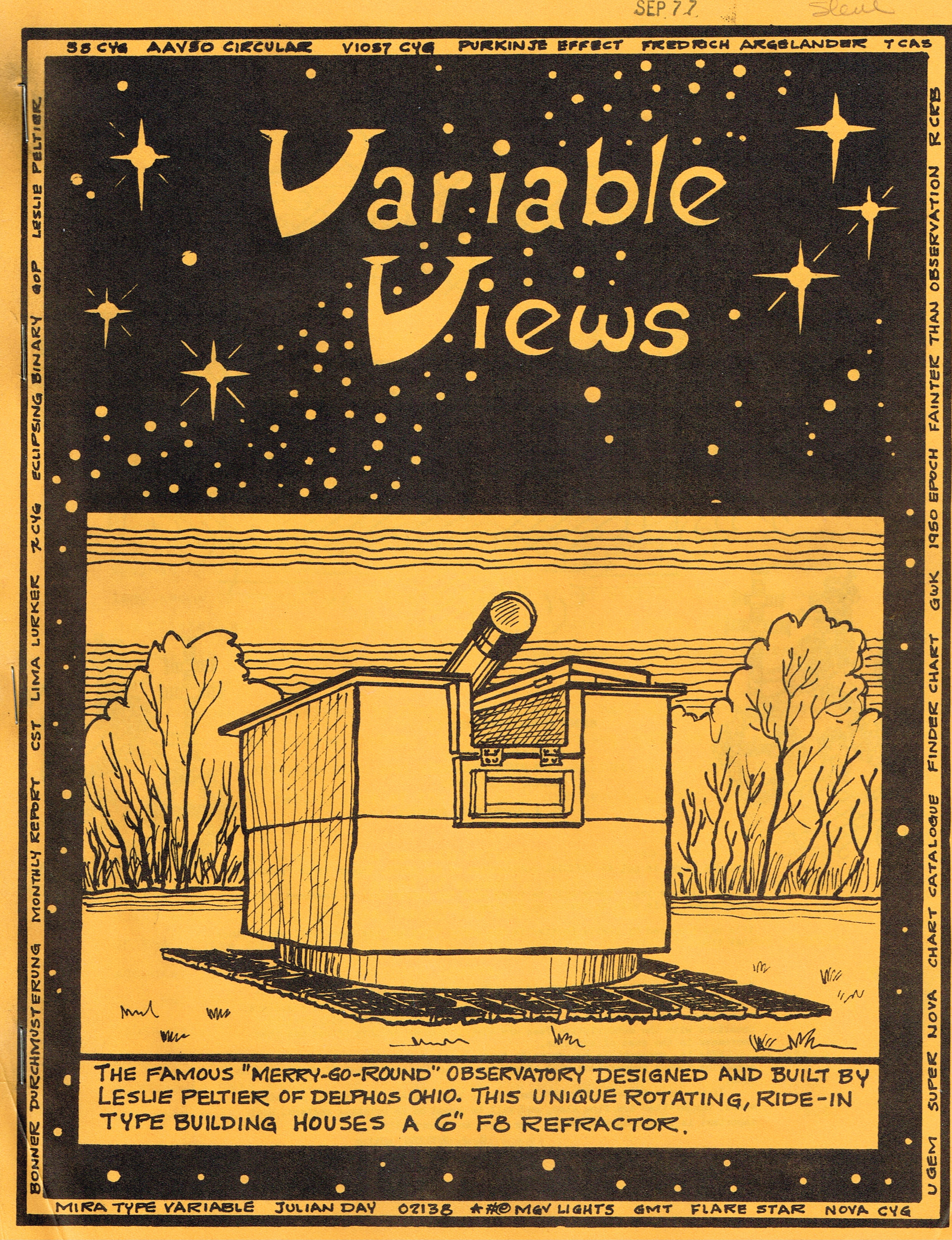
"Variable Views" Cover, Sept. 1977

The original purpose for Variable Views was to serve as a forum where observers could describe themselves and their observations. The newsletter became popular, with increasing length of entries and articles, eventually including the presentation of entire published articles. Subscribers were mostly other active observers who would occasionally gather at the Hurless' house for summer meetings. Hurless eventually ended the newsletter because it became too long with too many subscribers and the costs of producing it became too burdensome.

== Personal life ==
Other than being an astronomer, Hurless was a full-time music teacher along with her husband, Don Hurless. After her death, Don never remarried and lived in their house until his death on June 15, 2015.

== Honors and awards ==
In 1981, an asteroid was discovered by Brian Skiff and was named 3434 Hurless in her honor. In 2012, AAVSO also honored Hurless by launching and naming their four pilot programs The Carolyn Hurless Online Institute for Continuing Education (CHOICE). These pilot programs were the first step towards creating an online education center, which was a goal left behind by Hurless.

== Obituary ==
Mattei, Janet: Carolyn J. Hurless, 1934 - 1987: AAVSO's enthusiastic ambassador. Journal of the American Association of Variable Star Observers, Vol. 16, No. 1, p. 35 - 36.
