= Quest: The History of Spaceflight =

Science magazine

Quest: The History of Spaceflight Quarterly
- Cover of Volume 31 No. 3 issue (2024)
- Editor: Chris Gainor
- Categories: History of spaceflight
- Frequency: Quarterly
- Publisher: Scott Sacknoff
- Founded: 1992
- Company: The Space 3.0 Foundation
- Country: United States
- Based in: Bethesda, Maryland
- Language: English
- Website: www.spacehistory101.com
- ISSN: 1065-7738

Quest: The History of Spaceflight Quarterly is a quarterly science magazine that was established in 1992. It covers the history of spaceflight. The editor-in-chief is Chris Gainor.

== Awards ==
Quest was an inaugural recipient of the 2015 Ordway Award for Continued Excellence in Space History issued by the AAS. The publication has also run several papers that later won or been nominated for prestigious awards.

== Content ==
Each issue contains feature articles that run 6 to 12 pages on average, an oral history/interview with an important figure in the industry, and a number of book reviews that discuss the book and the underlying subject matter. Articles fall into one of eight categories: human spaceflight, robotic and scientific missions, policy, technology, international programs, military space, commercial space, and cultural aspects of space.

== Publication history ==
The journal was established by Glen Swanson in 1992 who published and edited volumes 1 through 5. Stephen Johnson (University of North Dakota) edited volumes 6 through 12. David Christopher Arnold was editor for volumes 13 through 22. Chris Gainor became editor with volume 23 in 2016. Scott Sacknoff volunteers as publisher.
