= Helen Sawyer Hogg =

American-Canadian astronomer (1905–1993)

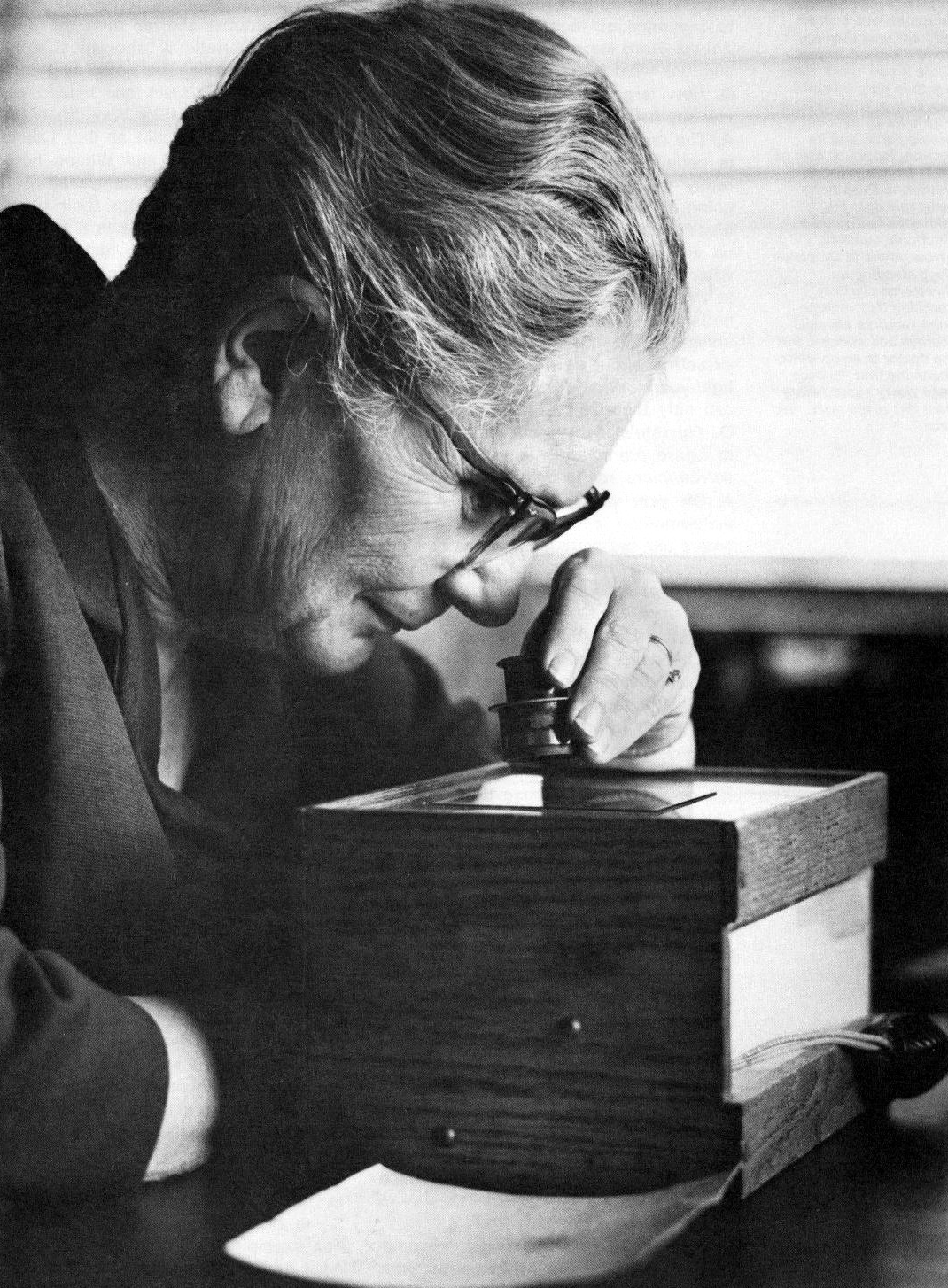
- Dr. Helen Sawyer Hogg, at a table in her office, studies a photographic slide taken of one of her favourite variable stars.
- Born: August 1, 1905; Lowell, Massachusetts, U.S.
- Died: January 28, 1993 (aged 87); Richmond Hill, Ontario, Canada
- Resting place: Lowell Cemetery, Lowell, Massachusetts
- Known for: Globular clusters
- Spouses: Frank Scott Hogg (m. 1930; died 1951) F.E.L.Priestly (m. 1985; died 1988)
- Awards: Annie J. Cannon Award in Astronomy (1949); Rittenhouse Medal (1967); Klumpke-Roberts Award (1983)
- Scientific career
- Fields: Astronomy
- Workplaces: David Dunlap Observatory, University of Toronto

Helen Battles Sawyer Hogg (August 1, 1905 – January 28, 1993) was an American-Canadian astronomer who pioneered research into globular clusters and variable stars. She was the first female president of several astronomical organizations and a scientist when many universities would not award scientific degrees to women. Her dedication to sharing astronomy with the wider public led to scientific advocacy and journalism, including columns in the Toronto Star ("With the Stars", 1951–81) and the Journal of the Royal Astronomical Society of Canada ("Out of Old Books", 1946–65). She was considered a "great scientist and a gracious person" over a career of sixty years.

== Early life ==
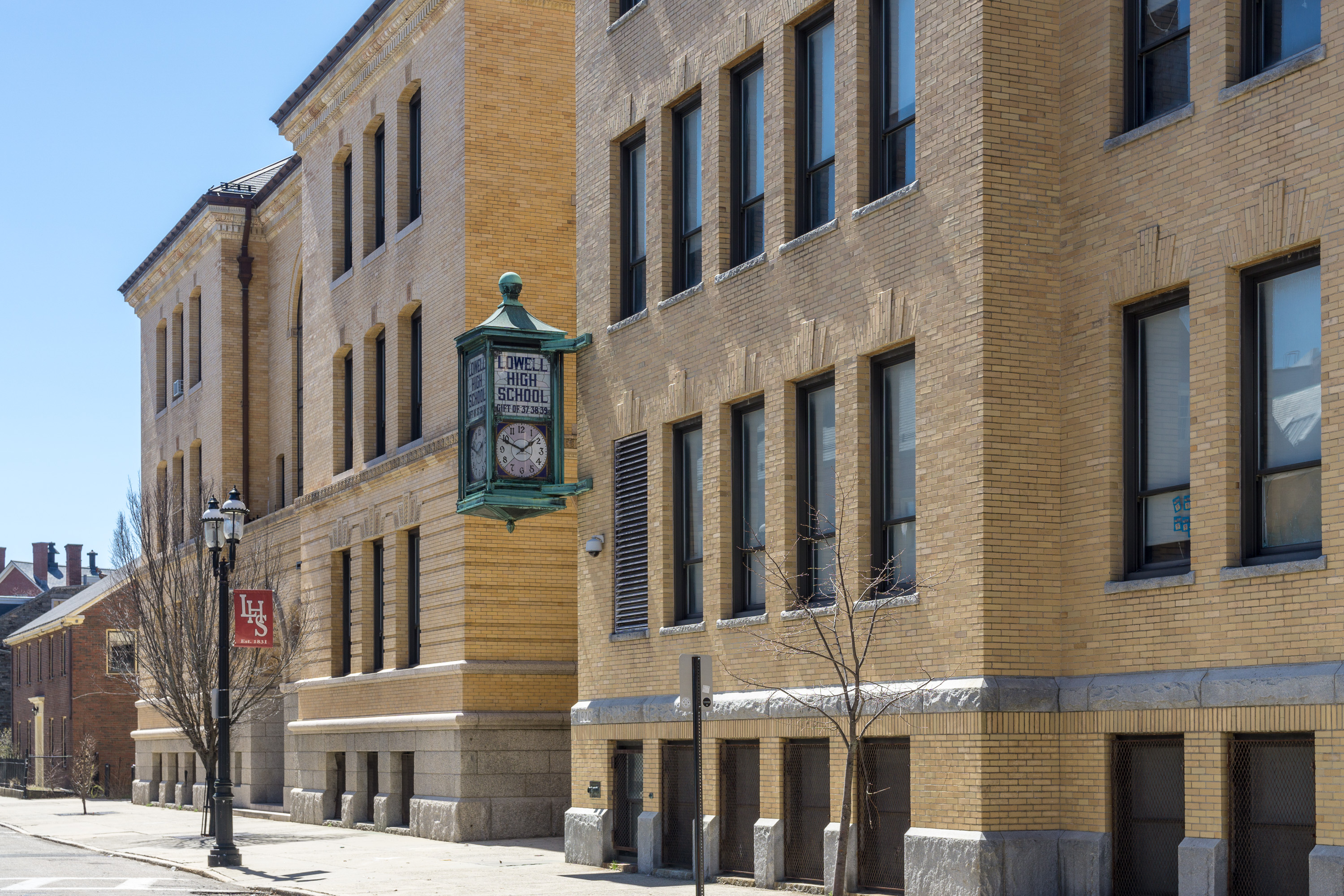
Lowell High School, where Helen graduated at 15 years old

Born in Lowell, Massachusetts, on August 1, 1905, Helen was the second daughter of banker Edward Everett Sawyer and former teacher Carrie Myra Sprague Sawyer. Academically gifted, Helen graduated from Lowell High School at the age of 15, but chose to stay for another year before leaving to attend Mount Holyoke College in 1922.

== Education ==
After graduating from high school, Hogg enrolled in Mount Holyoke College. Despite having nearly completed a chemistry degree, she changed her major from chemistry to astronomy after attending introductory astronomy classes with Dr. Anne Sewell Young in her junior year (1925). Dr. Sewell took her class to see the solar eclipse of January 24, 1925, and a year later Annie Jump Cannon, an astronomer working at Harvard University, came to visit Mount Holyoke. Hogg cited these experiences as defining moments that led to her career studying stars. In 1926 Hogg completed her undergraduate degree in astronomy, graduating magna cum laude.

After graduating from Mount Holyoke, Hogg received a fellowship for graduate study at Harvard Observatory in the fall of 1926 with the help of Dr. Cannon. Once at Harvard, Hogg worked with Dr. Harlow Shapley, the director of the graduate program in astronomy. Following the expectations and work ethic of Dr. Shapley, Hogg worked hard, long hours measuring the size and brightness of globular clusters and published several papers. Hogg received her master's degree in 1928 and her doctoral degree in 1931, both from Radcliffe College, as Harvard refused to award graduate degrees in science to women at the time.

For her advances in astronomy, Hogg received honorary doctoral degrees from six Canadian and U.S. Universities, including Mount Holyoke College and the University of Toronto.

== Scientific works ==
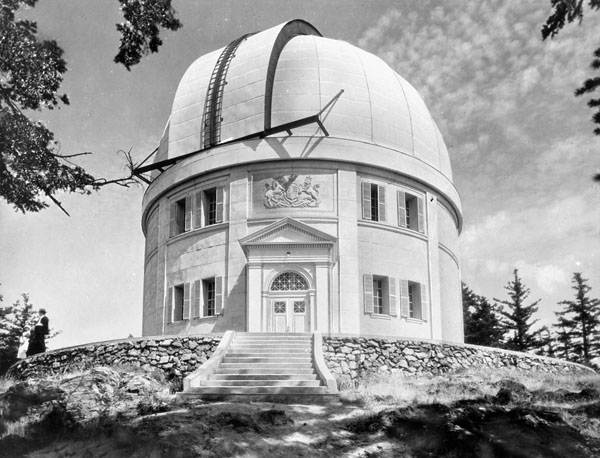
Dominion Astrophysical Observatory c. 1900–1925

While completing her doctoral degree, Hogg taught astronomy at Mount Holyoke and at Smith College. After graduation she moved to Victoria, British Columbia, where she began research at the Dominion Astrophysical Observatory. Hogg began taking photos of variable stars with the 72-inch reflecting telescope, cataloguing the cyclical changes in the brightness of the variable stars. At the Dominion Astrophysical Observatory, Hogg found 132 new variable stars in the globular cluster Messier 2. Hogg published this groundbreaking work in astronomical catalogues that are still used today. Notably, Hogg accomplished all of this as an unpaid volunteer assistant to her husband, as the Dominion Astrophysical Observatory would not offer her a job.

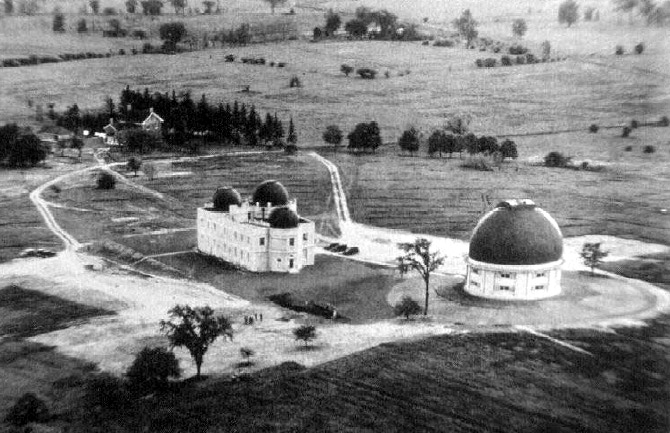
David Dunlap Observatory, 1935

In 1935 Hogg moved to the University of Toronto, after her husband had received a job offer to work at the David Dunlap Observatory. For her first year there, Hogg continued her work photographing globular clusters, amassing thousands of photographs which she used to identify many thousands of variable stars. She published Catalogue of 1116 Variable Stars in Globular Clusters in 1939, the first of three catalogues she completed, with a fourth in the works at the time of her death. In addition to her work on variable stars in globular clusters, Hogg used the period–luminosity relationship of Cepheid variable stars (discovered by Henrietta Swan Leavitt in 1908) to enhance the understanding of the Milky Way Galaxy's age, size and structure.

During the late 1930s, Hogg became one of the first astronomers to travel and work around the world to advance her research, as the globular clusters she was observing were best seen from the southern hemisphere.

From 1939 to 1941, Hogg returned to America to serve as the president of the American Association of Variable Star Observers (1939–1941) and the acting chair of Mount Holyoke's astronomy department (1940–1941). Upon returning to the David Dunlap Observatory, she took on teaching duties at the University of Toronto, largely as a result of male staff being away due to World War II. Retaining her position after the men returned from war, Hogg advanced to assistant professor in 1951, associate professor in 1955, full professor in 1957, and professor emerita in 1976 upon her retirement. Over her research career Hogg published more than 200 papers, and was a leading authority in astronomy.

== Scientific advocacy, awareness, and service ==
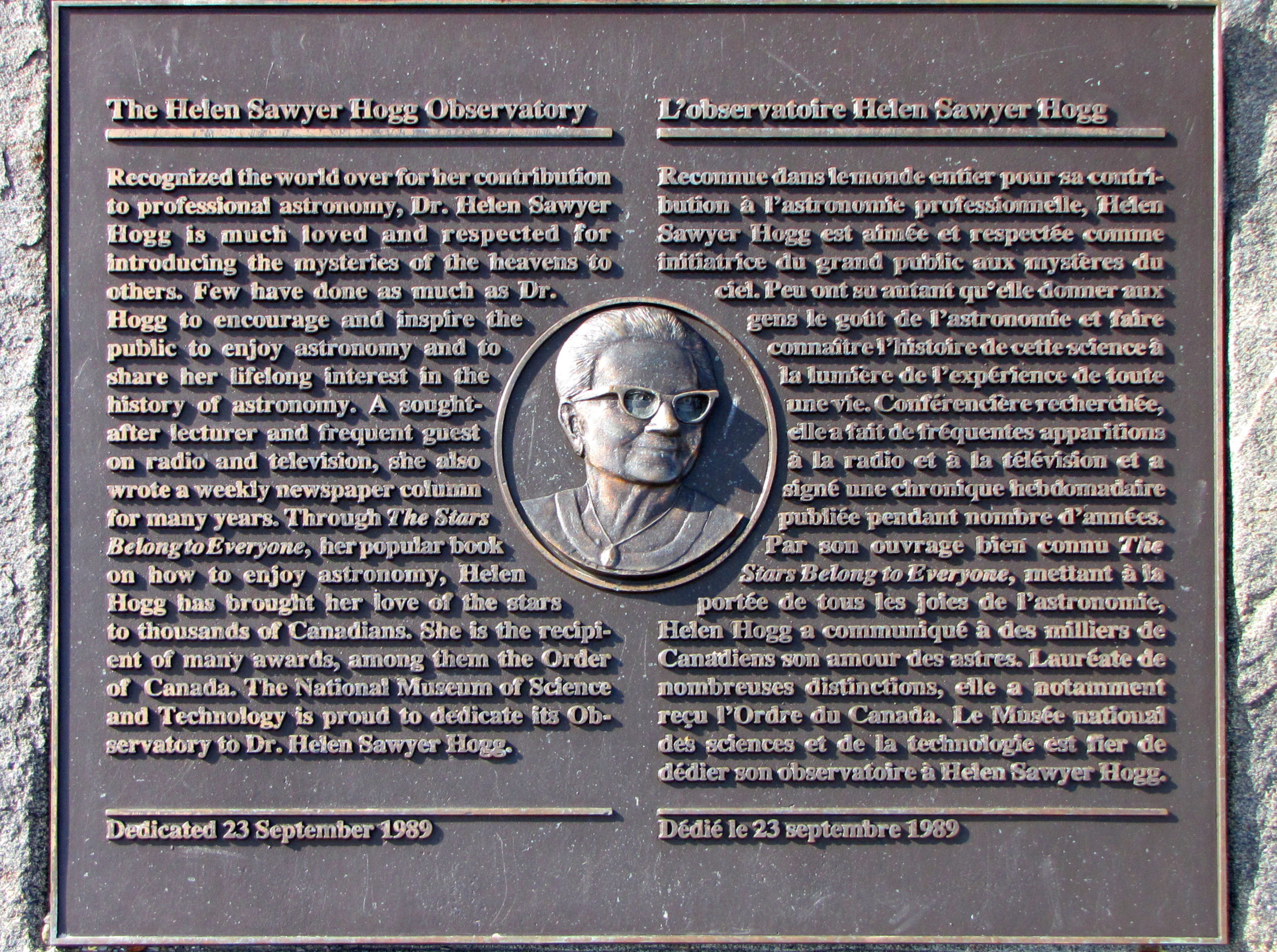
Plaque in recognition of Dr. Helen Hogg at Canadian Museum of Science and Technology

Not limiting herself to publishing her astronomical specialty of variable stars in globular clusters, Hogg published on the history of astronomy through her column "Out of Old Books", which was published in the Journal of the Royal Astronomical Society of Canada. She was also known for the 30 years she spent writing her weekly column "With the Stars", which was published in the Toronto Star. In addition, Hogg popularized astronomy with her book The Stars Belong to Everyone in 1976, an eight-show television series on Canadian educational television in 1970, and her role as founding president of the Canadian Astronomical Society. She also actively supported women to pursue science.

In addition to her advocacy and awareness work, "Helen presided over several Canadian astronomical and scientific organizations", and "served on the board of directors of Bell Telephone Company of Canada from 1968 to 1978". She was also the director of the National Science Foundation's astronomy program, and in this position she "helped determine sites for the National Radio Astronomy Observatory and for Kitt Peak National Observatory" in 1955. In 1960, "she became the first woman president of the physical sciences section of the Royal Society of Canada", as well as "the first female president of the Royal Canadian Institute (1964–1965)".

== Personal life ==
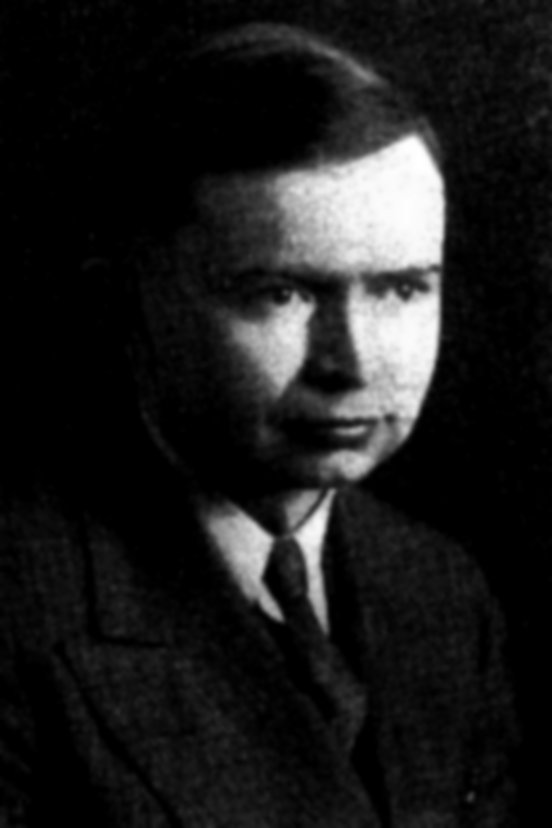
Helen's husband, Frank Scott Hogg

In 1930, she married Frank Scott Hogg, a fellow astronomy graduate student at Harvard, and the two moved to Victoria, British Columbia, in 1931. She gave birth to the couple's daughter, Sally, in June 1932. Hogg was able to continue her observation work by bringing her sleeping daughter with her to the observatory at night in a basket. The observatory's director, Dr. J. S. Plaskett, also was supportive; he gave Helen Sawyer Hogg a research grant of $200, which she used to hire a full-time housekeeper for an entire year, providing further support for her research work.

In 1935, the couple moved to Ontario to work at the University of Toronto's David Dunlap Observatory, where the couple's second child, David, was born in January 1936, followed shortly by their third child, James, in September 1937. Frank died in 1951 of a heart attack, and Helen picked up many of his professional responsibilities in addition to raising their three children. In 1985, Helen married Francis E. L. Priestley, a colleague and professor emeritus of English at the University of Toronto, who died in 1988.

Helen Sawyer Hogg died of a heart attack on January 28, 1993, in Richmond Hill, Ontario. An obituary written about Hogg's contributions to physics and astronomy was printed in the Journal of the Royal Astronomical Society of Canada.

== Awards and honors ==
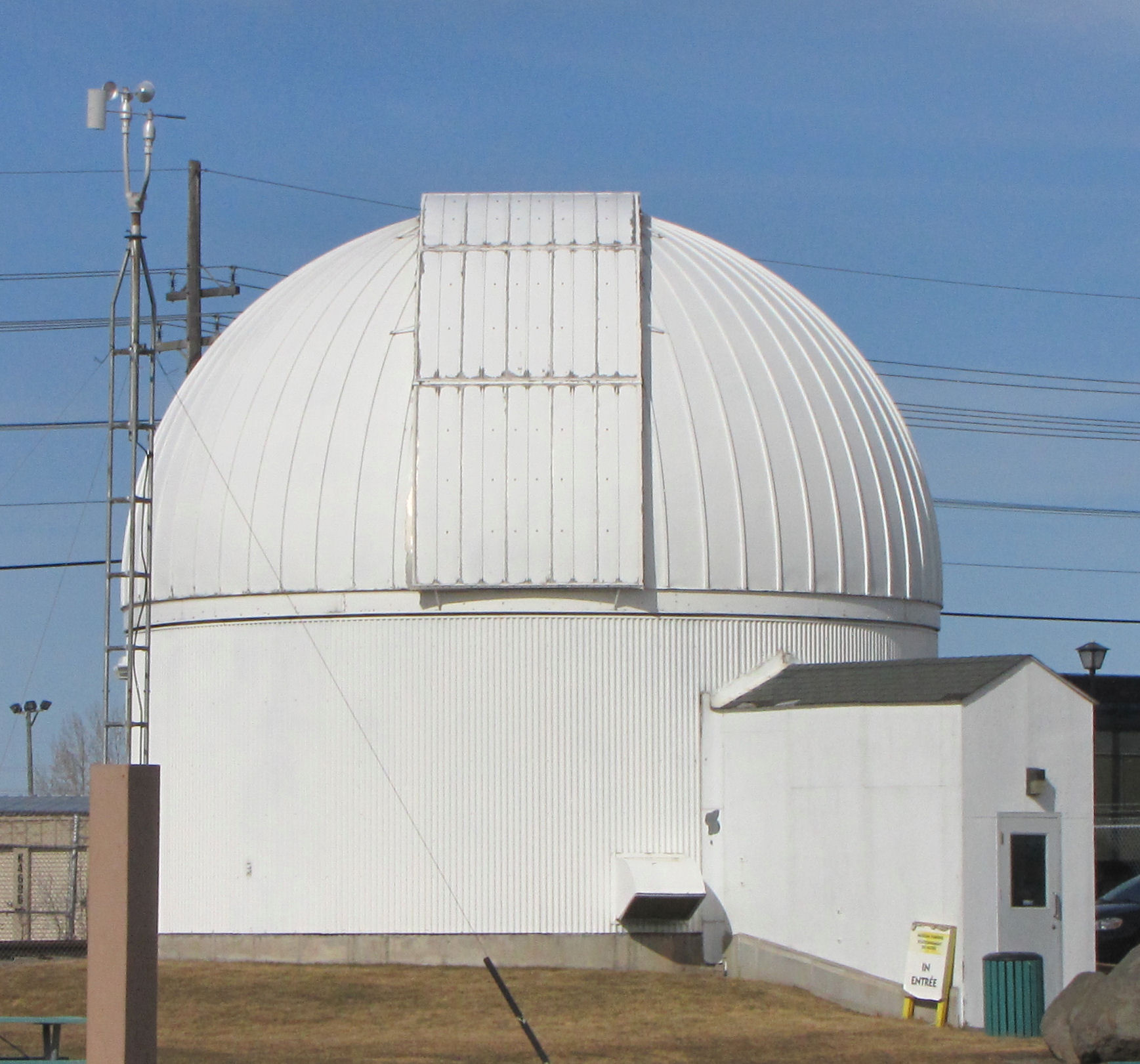
The Helen Sawyer Hogg Observatory

=== Awards ===
- Annie Jump Cannon Award in Astronomy of the American Astronomical Society in 1949
- Klumpke-Roberts Award from the Astronomical Society of the Pacific in 1984
- Sandford Fleming Award from the Royal Canadian Institute in 1985
- Rittenhouse Astronomical Society Silver Medal Award in 1967
- The Centennial Medal of Canada in 1967

=== Honors and dedications ===
- Made an Officer of the Order of Canada in 1968, and promoted to Companion in 1976 – considered one of the highest honors in the nation.
- The asteroid 2917 Sawyer Hogg is named after her.
- In 1989, the teaching observatory of the National Museum of Science in Ottawa, Ontario (now the Canada Science and Technology Museum), was dedicated to Hogg.
- In 1992, the telescope at the University of Toronto Southern Observatory (UTSO) on Cerro Las Campanas, Chile, was named in honour of Hogg.
- In 2004, Hogg was posthumously inducted into the Canadian Science and Engineering Hall of Fame.
- The University of Waterloo in Ontario, Canada, offers the Helen Sawyer Hogg scholarship in Astronomy to students who are enrolled in programs leading to graduate work in Astronomy. The value of the scholarship is $500.
