= Radha Gobinda Chandra =

Indian astronomer

Officer d’Academic Radha Gobinda Chandra OARF FAAVSO, FBBA, FVSS, AFOEV
- রাধা গোবিন্দ চন্দ্র
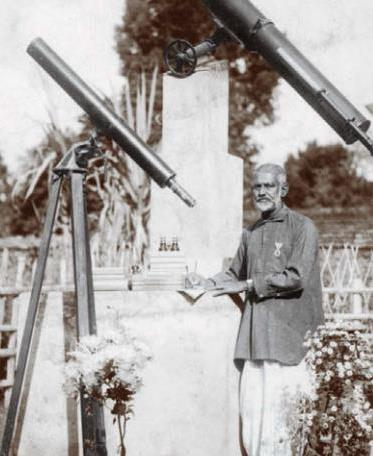
- Radha Gobinda Chandra with his telescopes. The bigger one is from Harvard College Observatory
- Born: 17 July 1878; Bagchar, Jessore District, Bengal, British India (now in Bangladesh)
- Died: 3 April 1975 (aged 96); Barasat, Calcutta, West Bengal, India
- Education: Jessore Zilla School
- Known for: Observation of Halley's Comet, 1910; Discovery of Nova Aquila-3, 1918; Observation on variable star; Observation of 7P/Pons–Winnecke comet; Observation of Comet Encke; Calendar reformation
- Awards: Officer d’Academic, 1928; Fellow of the American Association of Variable Star Observers, Harvard College Observatory, USA; Fellow of British Astronomical Association, England; Member of Variable star section; Member of Association Française des Observateurs d'Étoiles Variables, France; Honorary member of American Museum of Natural History, USA
- Scientific career
- Fields: Physics; Astronomy
- Academic advisors: Jadunath Majumdar; Jagadananda Roy; Kalinath Mukherjee

Radhagobinda Chandra OARF FAAVSO, FBBA, AFOEV (Bengali: রাধা গোবিন্দ চন্দ্র; July 17, 1878 – April 3, 1975) was an Indian astronomer. He was a pioneer of observational astronomy in the region of Bengal, comprising modern-day Bangladesh and West Bengal. He was born in Jessore, Bengal Presidency, British India. Radha Gobinda is especially famous for his observation of variable stars. He observed more than 49,700 variable stars and became one of the first international members of American Association of Variable Star Observers.

== Biography ==
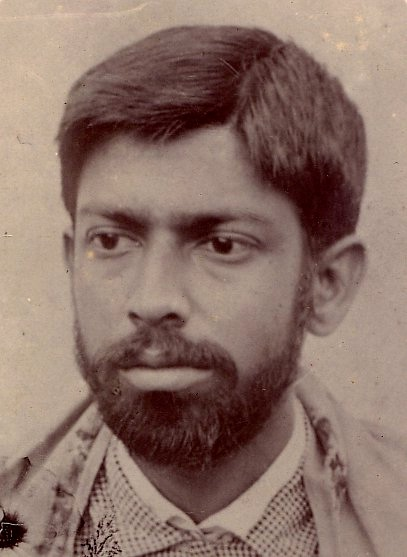
Radha Gobinda Chandra in his young age

Radha Gobinda was born in a small village named Bagchar in the district proper of Jessore in Bengal Presidency, British India on July 17, 1878. His father, Gorachand was the assistant of a local doctor and mother, Padmamukh, was a housewife. His primary education started in Bakchar School. After passing from here he was admitted in Jessore Zilla School at the age of 10. At this time Chandra started observing the stars in the sky by naked eye. But he was not that interested in formal education. Instead his main interest was centered on the mysterious night sky. Due to this lack of attention in formal education he failed to pass Secondary School Certificate (SSC) three times subsequently.

In 1899, at an age of 21, Radhagobinda married Gobinda Mohini, a girl from Murshidabad who was just 9 years old at that time. Together they had a boy named Kal (English: time) and a girl named Barsha (English: rain). After marriage Chandra attended the SSC exam for the last time and failed again. Due to these failures he left formal education and planned to start a job. After searching a job for two years he was finally able get a job of ordinary treasurer in Jessore collectorate office. Then his monthly salary was only 15 Taka. Later he became treasury clerk and after that chief treasurer of in this office.

From a very early age he had immense interest in astronomy and later in life started doing amateur astronomy on his own. According to his autobiography, when he was in grade 6 at school, he read a prose on astronomy and cosmology by Bengal writer Akshay Kumar Datta from the textbook Charupath, which inspired him to become an astronomer. He was first practically introduced with the sky when he got scientific apprenticeship with a lawyer named Kalinath Mukherjee who was then editing the 'Star Atlas'.

== Observation of Halley's Comet ==
In the year of 1910 (April–July), Chandra observed the Halley's Comet from Jessore with his small binocular as he did not have any powerful binocular or other helping tool. He wrote the details information of his observation in the 'Hindu Magazine' of that time.

== Telescope collection ==
In 1912, Chandra purchased a 3-inch lens telescope from England for 13 pounds.

== Contributions in astronomy ==
From then on, he continued regular observation of variable stars with the help of the 'Star Atlas' by Kalinath Mukhajee.

He communicated a total of 37,215 trained-eye observations up to 1954.

He worked at a longitude far from that of most observers, improving the temporal completeness of the observational records for the stars he observed.

== Discovery of nova ==
It was June 7, 1918. Chandra used to observe stars most of the nights at that time. He suddenly noticed a bright star. He tried to match it with the Star Map but did not find any. He observed it for the next few days and came to decision that it is a new one. In the language of astronomy it was a Nova. He published the detail description of this Nova in the Prabasi magazine of that time. Later this nova was named as 'Nova Aquila-3'.

== Membership of AAVSO ==
Chandra sent his observatory report to Edward Charles Pickering who was then a researcher of Harvard Space Observatory. Pickering gave him a lot of inspiration and sent some books to him. He invited him to become a member of 'American Association of Variable Star Observers (AAVSO)'. He became a member of AAVSO which, in 1926, gave him a 6-inch aperture telescope sent from the USA. The first international member of the AAVSO was Giovanni B. Lacchini of Faenza, Italy. In his lifetime Lacchini contributed over 58,000 observations to the AAVSO. Among other early international observers was Radha G. Chandra who made over 49,700 observations up to 1954.

== Retirement ==
It was 1954 when Chandra finally retired from observing at the age of 76.

He was asked to pass on the AAVSO telescope to Manali Kallat Vainu Bappu (1927–82) then at Nainital. The Elmer-Chandra telescope, one of the very few American telescopes in British India is now at Kavalur Observatory.

This most dedicated observer of the time worked outside the pale of the astronomical society died in the year 1975.

I don't know whether anyone else wished to be an astronomer after reading the third chapter of Charupath by Akshay Datta but I did. I never tried to obstruct that exuberant and rollicking wish and it came true.
