= FM Circini =

2018 Nova event in the constellation Circinus

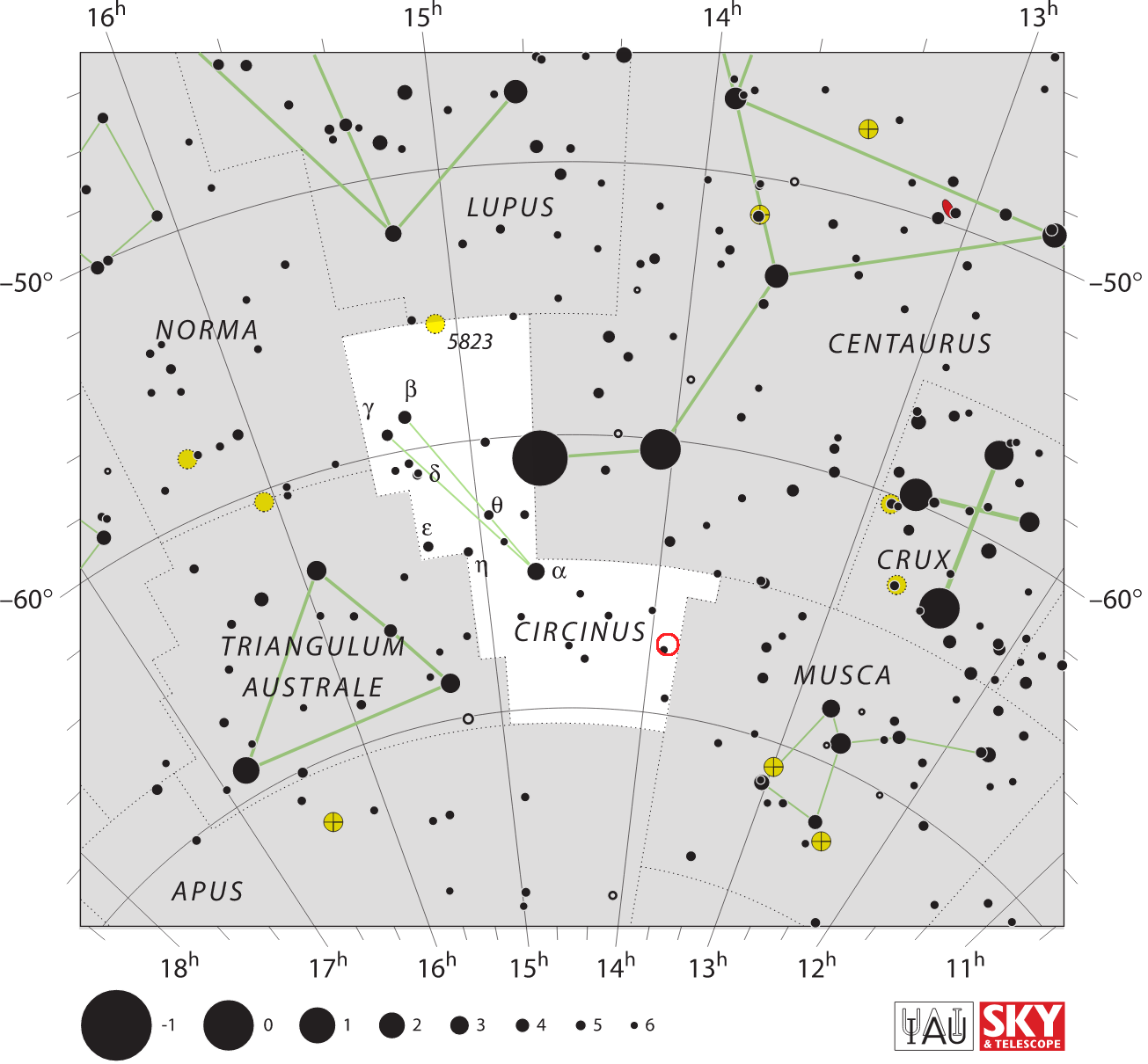
- Location of FM Circini (circled in red)

Observation data Epoch J2000 Equinox ICRS
- Constellation: Circinus
- Right ascension: 13^{h} 53^{m} 27.00^{s}
- Declination: −67° 25′ 11.0″
- Apparent magnitude (V): 5.8 – 17.3

Characteristics
- Variable type: Nova

Other designations
- Nova Circini 2018, PNV J13532700-6725110, FM Cir, Gaia18aod

Database references
SIMBAD	data

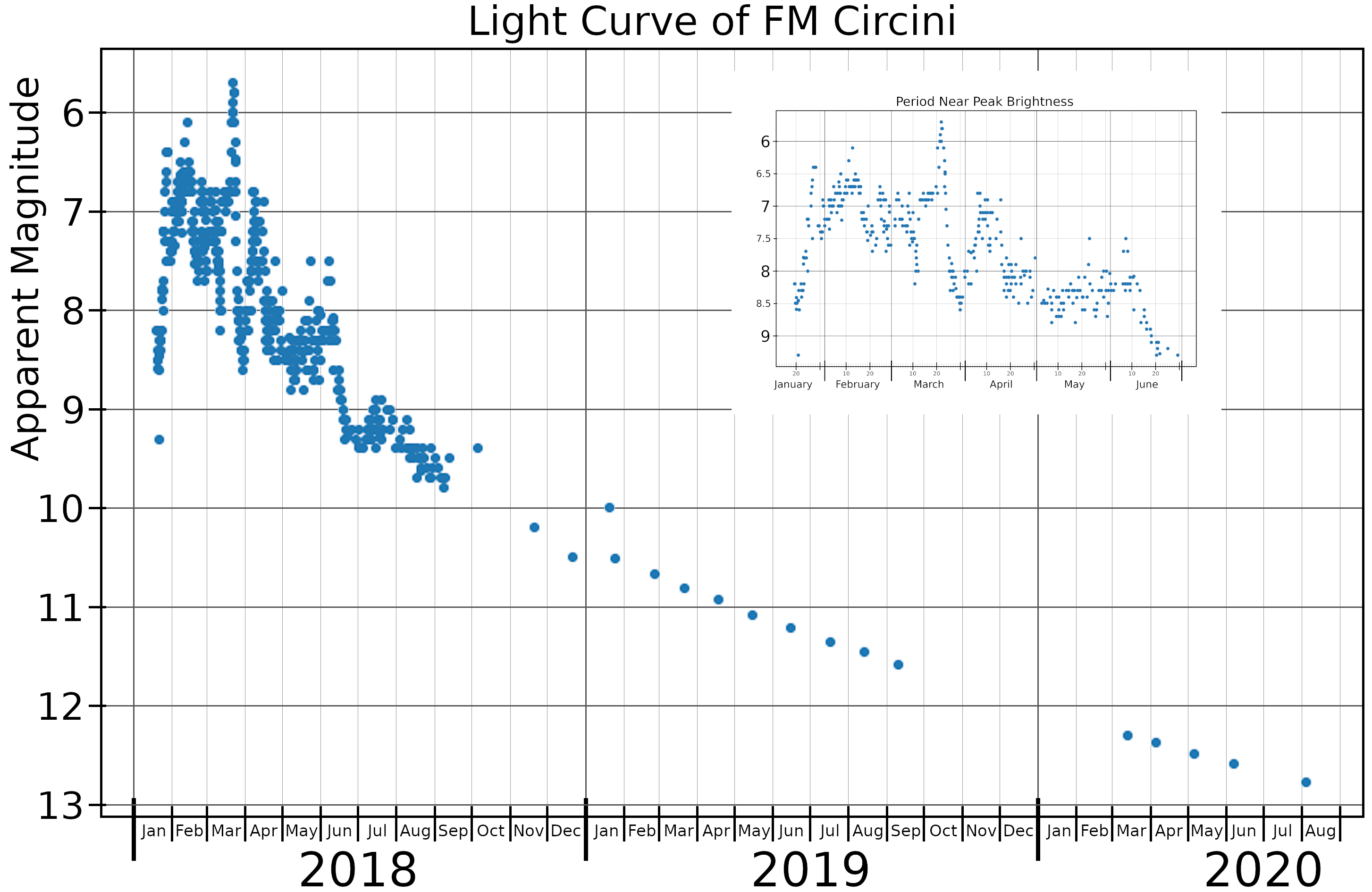
The light curve of FM Circini plotted from AAVSO data

FM Circini, also known as Nova Circini 2018, was a nova which appeared in the constellation Circinus (near the boarder with Musca) in 2018. It was discovered by John Search of Chatsworth Island, New South Wales, Australia on 19.708 January 2018, using a DSLR with a 50 mm F/1.2 lens. At the time of its discovery, it had an apparent visual magnitude of 9.1. It was confirmed to be a nova spectroscopically on 21 January 2018. FM Circini reached a peak brightness of magnitude 5.8 on 22 March 2018, making it visible to the naked eye.

FM Circini's outburst and decline from peak brightness was observed by the Gaia spacecraft, the All Sky Automated Survey for SuperNovae and AAVSO observers. The nova rose slowly to peak brightness, and then fluctuated between magnitude ~6.5 and ~8.5 for about three months, before beginning a nearly monotonic decline. It took 150 days for FM Circini to fade from peak brightness by 2 magnitudes, which makes it a "slow" nova in the classification scheme of Cecilia Payne-Gaposchkin.

The orbital period of FM Circini is 3.4898 days. The lightcurve shows modulations in the tail (after the eruption).
