= Janet Akyüz Mattei =

Turkish-American astronomer

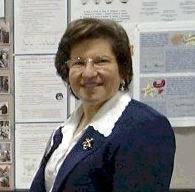
- Born: Janet Hanula Akyüz; January 2, 1943; Bodrum, Turkey
- Died: March 22, 2004 (aged 61); Boston, Massachusetts, U.S.
- Education: Brandeis University (BS); University of Virginia (MS); Ege University (PhD)
- Awards: Centennial Medal of the Société Astronomique de France (1987); George Van Biesbroeck Prize; American Astronomical Society (1993); Leslie Peltier Award; Astronomical League (1993); Giovanni Battista Lacchini Award for Collaboration with Amateur Astronomers by Unione Astrofili Italiani (1995); Jackson-Gwilt Medal of the Royal Astronomical Society (1995)
- Scientific career
- Fields: Astronomy and planetary science
- Workplaces: American Association of Variable Star Observers (AAVSO); McCormick Observatory; Maria Mitchell Observatory

Janet Hanula Mattei (née Akyüz; January 2, 1943 – March 22, 2004) was a Turkish-American astronomer who was the director of the American Association of Variable Star Observers (AAVSO) from 1973 to 2004.

== Biography ==
Janet Hanula Akyüz was born in Bodrum, Turkey, the eldest of five siblings born to Turkish Jewish parents, Bella and Baruh Akyüz. She was educated at the American Collegiate Institute, İzmir. She came to the United States for university studies, and attended Brandeis University in Waltham, MA on the Wien Scholarship. Later, she was offered a job by Dorrit Hoffleit at the Maria Mitchell Observatory in Nantucket, Massachusetts.

She worked at Leander McCormick Observatory in Charlottesville, Virginia from 1970 to 1972 and received her M.A. in Astronomy from the University of Virginia in 1972 and her Ph.D. in Astronomy from Ege University in İzmir, Turkey, 1982.

As head of the AAVSO for over 30 years, she collected observations of variable stars by amateur astronomers from around the world. She coordinated many important observing programs between amateur observers and professional astronomers. She was also keenly interested in education and student science projects. Under her direction, the database of the association was made available to educators and also assisted non-professional astronomers access the Hubble Space Telescope.

== Awards and honors ==
Mattei won many awards, including the Centennial Medal of the Société Astronomique de France, 1987; George Van Biesbroeck Prize, American Astronomical Society, 1993; Leslie Peltier Award, Astronomical League, 1993; first Giovanni Battista Lacchini Award for collaboration with amateur astronomers, Unione Astrofili Italiani, 1995; and the Jackson-Gwilt Medal of the Royal Astronomical Society, 1995. Asteroid 11695 Mattei was named in her honor on January 9, 2001 (M.P.C. 41938).

== Death ==
She died of leukemia in Boston in 2004, aged 61.
