= Chris Gainor =

E

- Born: 1954 (age 71–72); Taber, Alberta, Canada
- Education: Ph.D., Master of Science and a Bachelor of Arts
- Occupation: historian
- Website: http://chrisgainor.blogspot.com

Christopher Gainor (born 1954) is a historian of technology specializing in space exploration and aeronautics. He has written six books on the history of space exploration and on the Avro Canada CF-105 Arrow, a jet interceptor aircraft canceled by the Canadian government in 1959.

== Early life ==
Gainor was born in 1954 in Taber, Alberta.

== Career ==
Gainor has been editor of Quest: The History of Spaceflight Quarterly since 2016. He served as president of the Royal Astronomical Society of Canada from 2018 to 2020, and he is a fellow of the British Interplanetary Society. Asteroid 20041 Gainor has been named for him.

Gainor holds a Ph.D. in the history of technology from the University of Alberta, and has worked as a history instructor in the University of Victoria's history department and as an Assistant Professor for the Royal Military College of Canada.

Earlier in his career, Gainor worked as a reporter for the Vancouver Sun, where he won a National Newspaper Award for a series on Canadian cancer activist Terry Fox. He also has worked and written for several other publications, and worked for governmental and non-governmental organizations.

His first book, Arrows to the Moon, tells the story of the 32 British and Canadian aerospace engineers who went to work for the National Aeronautics and Space Administration in 1959 after losing their jobs when the Canadian government cancelled the Avro Arrow. Many of these engineers went on to hold top positions in NASA, including Jim Chamberlin, John Hodge, Owen Maynard, and Tecwyn Roberts. He returned to the history of the Avro Arrow with his book Who Killed the Avro Arrow?

Gainor has also written on the history of missile and space programs in the first years after World War II, including his book To A Distant Day: The Rocket Pioneers and The Bomb and America's Missile Age, which discusses how the U.S. Air Force decided to build its first intercontinental ballistic missile, the Atlas missile. He has also written about the history of the Canadian space program, including his book Canada in Space. In 2020, Gainor completed a history of Hubble Space Telescope operations for the National Aeronautics and Space Administration.

== Publications ==
- Arrows to the Moon: Avro's Engineers and the Space Race (2001) Apogee Books
- Canada in Space: The People & Stories Behind Canada's Role in the Exploration of Space (2006) Folklore Publishing
- Who killed the Avro Arrow? (2007) Folklore Publishing
- To a Distant Day: The Rocket Pioneers (2008) University of Nebraska Press
- The Bomb and America's Missile Age (2018) Johns Hopkins University Press
- Not Yet Imagined: A Study of Hubble Space Telescope Operations (2020) NASA History Division
