= V392 Persei =

Nova in the constellation Perseus

- Location of V392 Persei (circled)

Observation data Epoch J2000.0 Equinox ICRS
- Constellation: Perseus
- Right ascension: 04^{h} 43^{m} 21.37^{s}
- Declination: +47° 21′ 25.9″
- Apparent magnitude (V): 6.3 - 16.9

Characteristics
- B−V color index: +1.0
- V−R color index: +0.9
- Variable type: dwarf nova & nova

Astrometry
Proper motion (μ)	RA: 0.193 mas/yr Dec.: −1.749 mas/yr
Parallax (π)	0.2573±0.0516 mas
Distance	4161+2345 −440 pc
Absolute magnitude (M_{V})	−10.1 (max)

Other designations
- AAVSO 0435+47, V392 Per, 2MASS J04432138+4721257, Gaia DR2 254361745823908736

Database references
SIMBAD	data

V392 Persei, also known as Nova Persei 2018, is a bright nova in the constellation Perseus discovered on April 29, 2018. It was previously known as a dwarf nova.

== Dwarf nova ==
A U Geminorum-type variable star or dwarf nova is a type of cataclysmic variable star consisting of a close binary star system in which one of the components is a white dwarf that accretes matter from a cool main sequence or subgiant companion. V392 Persei was discovered in 1970 and received its variable star designation a year later. It is normally visual magnitude 17.4 and experiences outbursts of 2-3 magnitudes. Its spectrum in the quiescent state has been studied and only the cool star is detected. The spectrum shows emission lines of hydrogen-alpha (Hα) and both neutral and ionised helium. The brightest recorded observations is at magnitude 5.6.

== Nova eruption ==
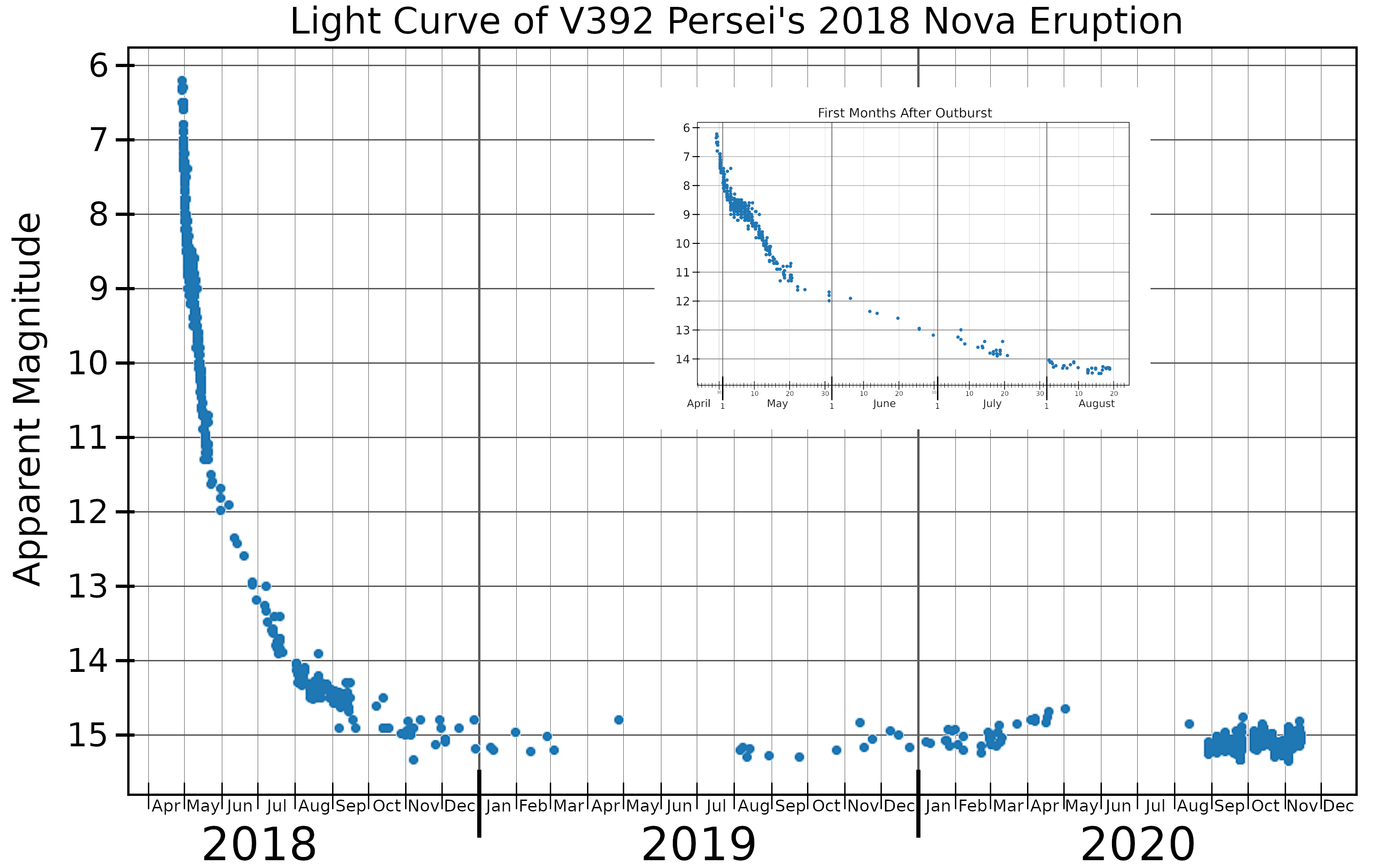
The light curve of V392 Persei's 22018 nova eruption plotted from AAVSO data

On April 29, 2018 it was discovered by Yuji Nakamura to be extremely bright, and it was spectroscopically confirmed as a nova outburst with magnitude 6.2 on April 30. The spectrum includes broad Hα and FeII emission lines with P Cygni profiles. The absorption core is blueshifted by a velocity of 2,680 km/s, which would be the expansion velocity from the nova explosion.

Observations with Fermi-LAT on April 30 show a strong gamma-ray source at the coordinates of the nova. Photometry of the nova from Konkoly Observatory on May 1, 2018 give apparent magnitudes of 7.38 in the V band and 8.22 in the B band, suggesting it is already declining.

== System ==
V392 Persei is the southern of a pair of stars separated by 8.5".

The symbiotic pair are unresolved, with an orbital period of only 3.21997 days, and the nature of the cool component is unclear. The spectral energy distribution is inconsistent with a bright giant star but it could be less luminous red clump giant or subgiant. If the cool component was a main sequence red dwarf as expected for a dwarf nova, then the system would need to be closer than the 13,000 ly suggested by its Gaia parallax.

== Gallery ==
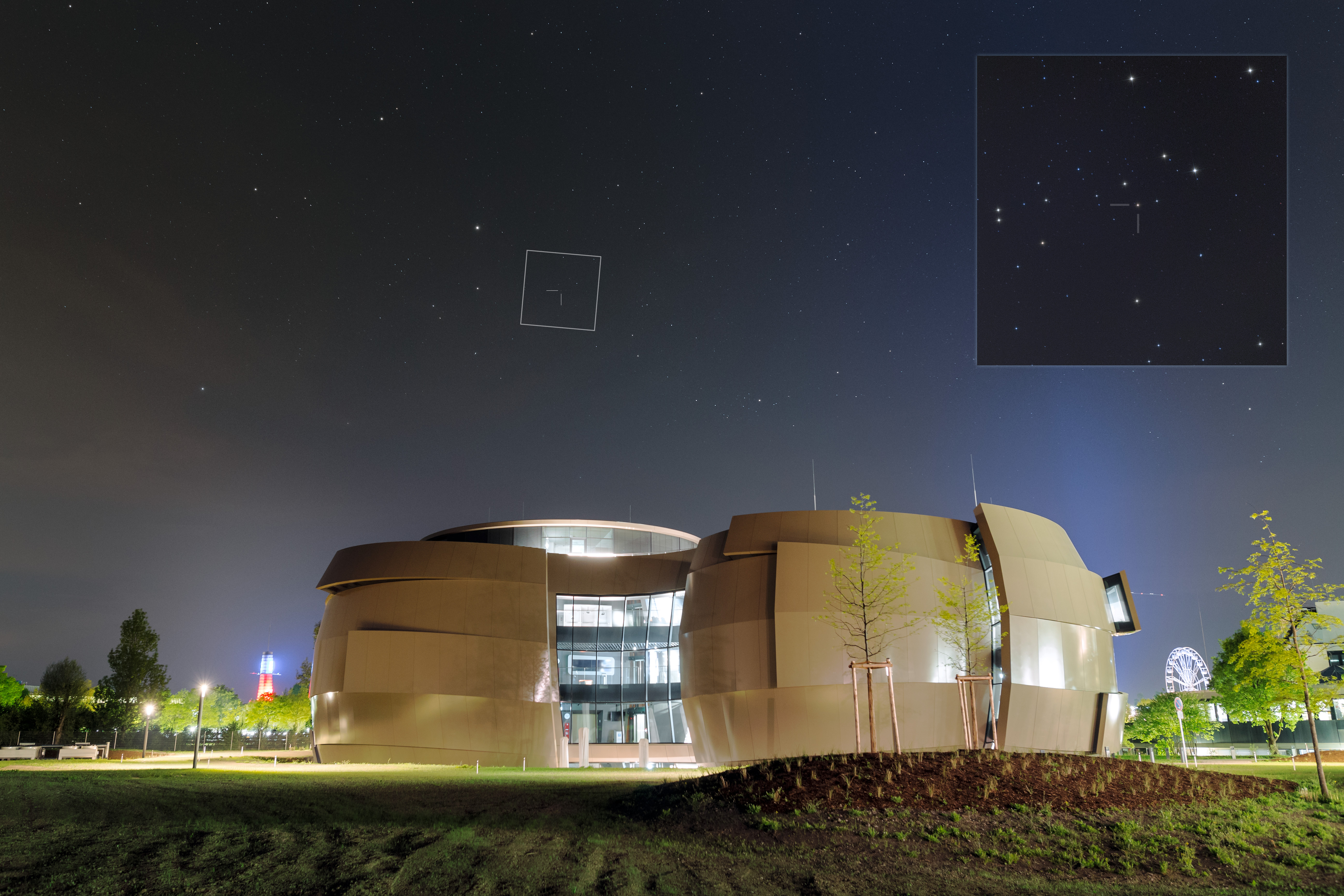
Dwarf nova V392 Persei over the ESO Supernova Planetarium & Visitor Centre.

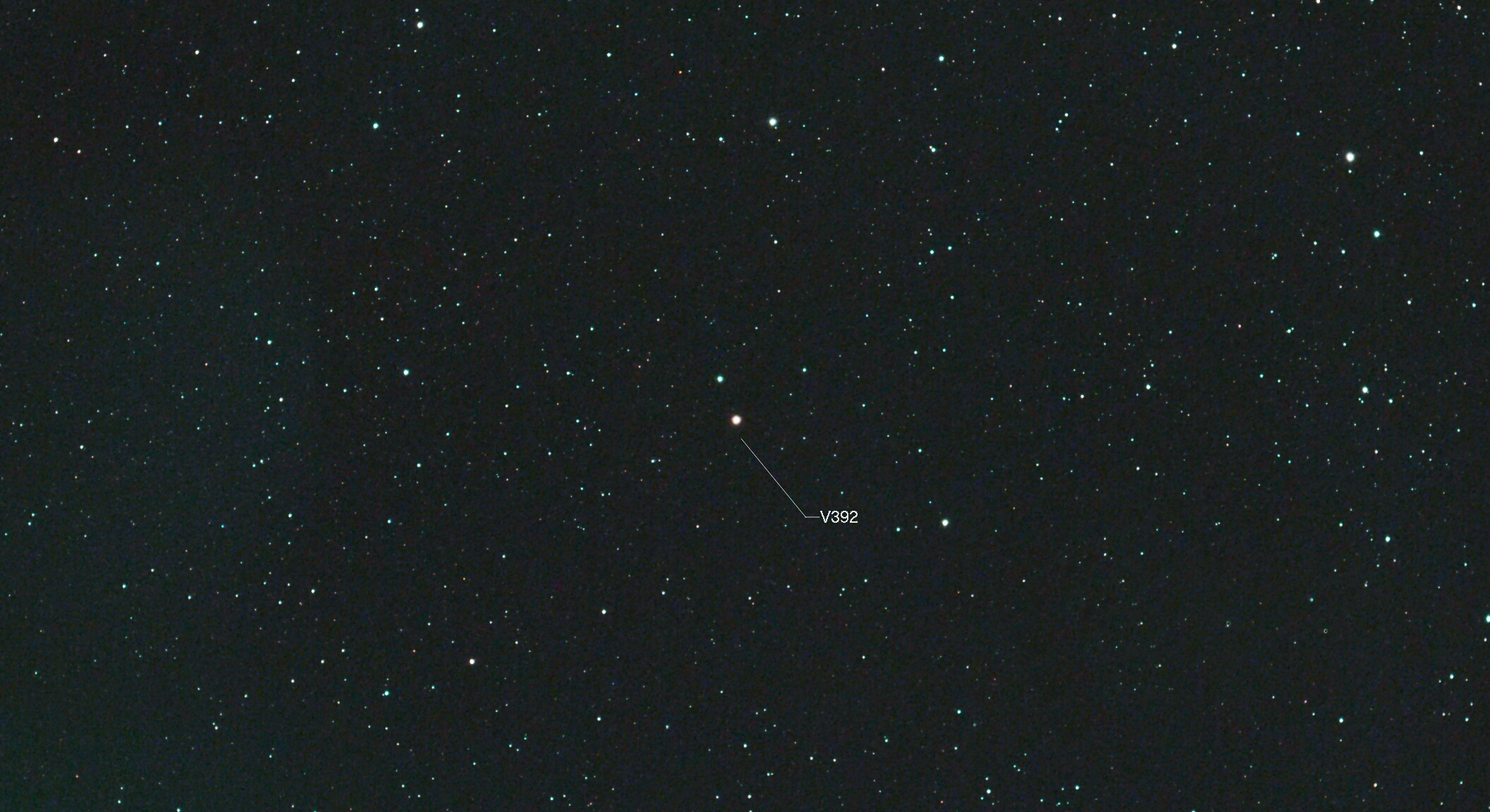
V392 Persei, 2 May 2018, 22:00 UT. The slightly fainter nearby star is 9th magnitude BD+47°1026. Up is approximately east.

== See also ==
- List of novae in the Milky Way galaxy
