= Arne Henden =

American astronomer

Minor planets discovered: 1
239046 Judysyd	25 February 2006	MPC
co-discovered with Stephen Levine

Arne Henden (born 1950) is a retired American observational astronomer, instrument and software specialist, and co-discoverer of a minor planet. He formerly served as director of the American Association of Variable Star Observers (AAVSO). The asteroid 33529 Henden is named after him.

== Early life ==
Henden was born in Huron, South Dakota, but as the son of an engineer in the U.S. Army Corps of Engineers, he would call several places home as he grew up with his parents and two sisters. His first astronomical brush happened when he had a chance to look at Saturn through the 24" Clarke refractor at the Lowell Observatory in Flagstaff, Arizona.

Henden gained his Bachelor of Science in astrophysics in 1972, and his Masters in Physics in 1975 both from the University of New Mexico in Albuquerque. In 1978 he continued to gain a Masters of Science in 1978 and a Ph.D. in 1985 in Astronomy, both from the Indiana University Bloomington.

== Work ==
Henden moved to Ohio State University to work on the Large Binocular Telescope after gaining his doctorate. He also built several imagers and spectrographs for the 1.8-meter Perkins telescope.

in 1992, he returned to work at the United States Naval Observatory Flagstaff Station (NOFS) as a senior research scientist, the site where his love for astronomy first started. At NOFS, he specialized in visual and near-IR imaging systems and co-discovered 239046 Judysyd, a faint asteroid of the main-belt, in collaboration with astronomer Stephen Levine on 25 February 2006. Henden was also part of the team that created specifications for Lowell Observatory's 4.3-m Discovery Channel Telescope. He has also worked on the Sloan Digital Sky Survey and consulted for the Radio Astronomy Institute in developing a robotic observatory near the Grand Canyon.

In the Spring of 2004, Henden was named director of the American Association of Variable Star Observers (AAVSO), an organization he had long been a member of.

Henden has authored more than 100 articles in peer-reviewed publications as either primary or co-author. Henden has also positioned himself as a specialist in photometry by writing one of the classic texts in the subject: Astronomical Photometry (1978: Willman-Bell) Henden has worked extensively with amateurs interested in variable stars and minor planet astrometry mainly through the AAVSO.

=== Awards and honors ===
He was elected a Legacy Fellow of the American Astronomical Society in 2020.

33529 Henden, a main-belt asteroid discovered by American amateur astronomer Charles Juels in 1999, was officially named in his honor by IAU's Minor Planet Center on 18 September 2005 (M.P.C. 54827).
