= Ida E. Woods =

American astronomer (1870–1940)

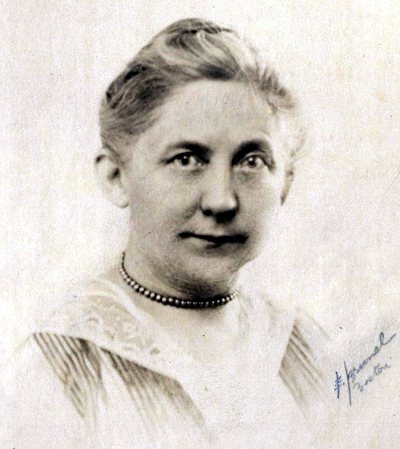
- ca. 1893
- Born: Ida Elizabeth Woods; September 16, 1870; Natick, Massachusetts
- Died: October 4, 1940 (aged 70); Natick, Massachusetts
- Scientific career
- Fields: Astronomy

Ida E. Woods (September 16, 1870 – October 4, 1940) was an American astronomer at Harvard College Observatory.

== Early life ==
Ida Elizabeth Woods was born in Natick, Massachusetts, the daughter of Oliver Powers Woods and Martha Wright Woods. She graduated from Wellesley College in 1893.

== Career ==
Woods began working As a human computer at Harvard College Observatory immediately after graduating from college in 1893, where she worked alongside Harlow Shapley and Annie Jump Cannon. She studied photographic plates to discover dozens of variable stars during her career. She attended the meeting of the American Association of Variable Star Observers (AAVSO) in 1916, when it was held at Harvard.

Publications by Woods included "Light Curve and Orbit of a New Eclipsing Binary H. V. 3622" (1922), "Fifty New Variable Stars in the Southern Milky Way" (1926), "The Southern Station of the Harvard Observatory" (1927), and "Forty New Variable Stars in Sagitarrius" (1928).

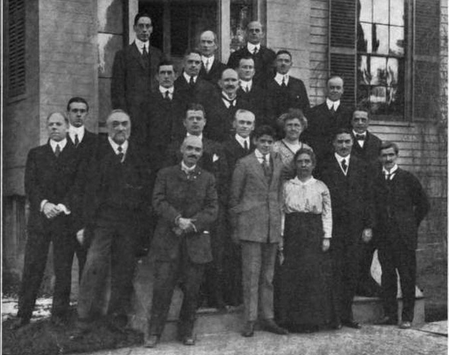
The meeting of the AAVSO at Harvard in 1916. The two women in the photograph are Ida E. Woods (front row) and Annie Jump Cannon (behind Woods).

Woods held the Sarah F. Whitin Fellowship from Wellesley College in 1912, to fund her research at Harvard. She was a member of the Sagamore Sociological Conference.

== Personal life ==
Woods died in 1940, at her home in Natick. She was 70 years old.
