= V357 Muscae =

Nova in the constellation Musca

- The nova is located near the NW corner of Musca

Observation data Epoch J2000 Equinox ICRS
- Constellation: Musca
- Right ascension: 11^{h} 26^{m} 12.20^{s}
- Declination: −65° 31′ 08.6″

Other designations
- Nova Mus 2018, PNV J11261220-6531086

Database references
SIMBAD	data

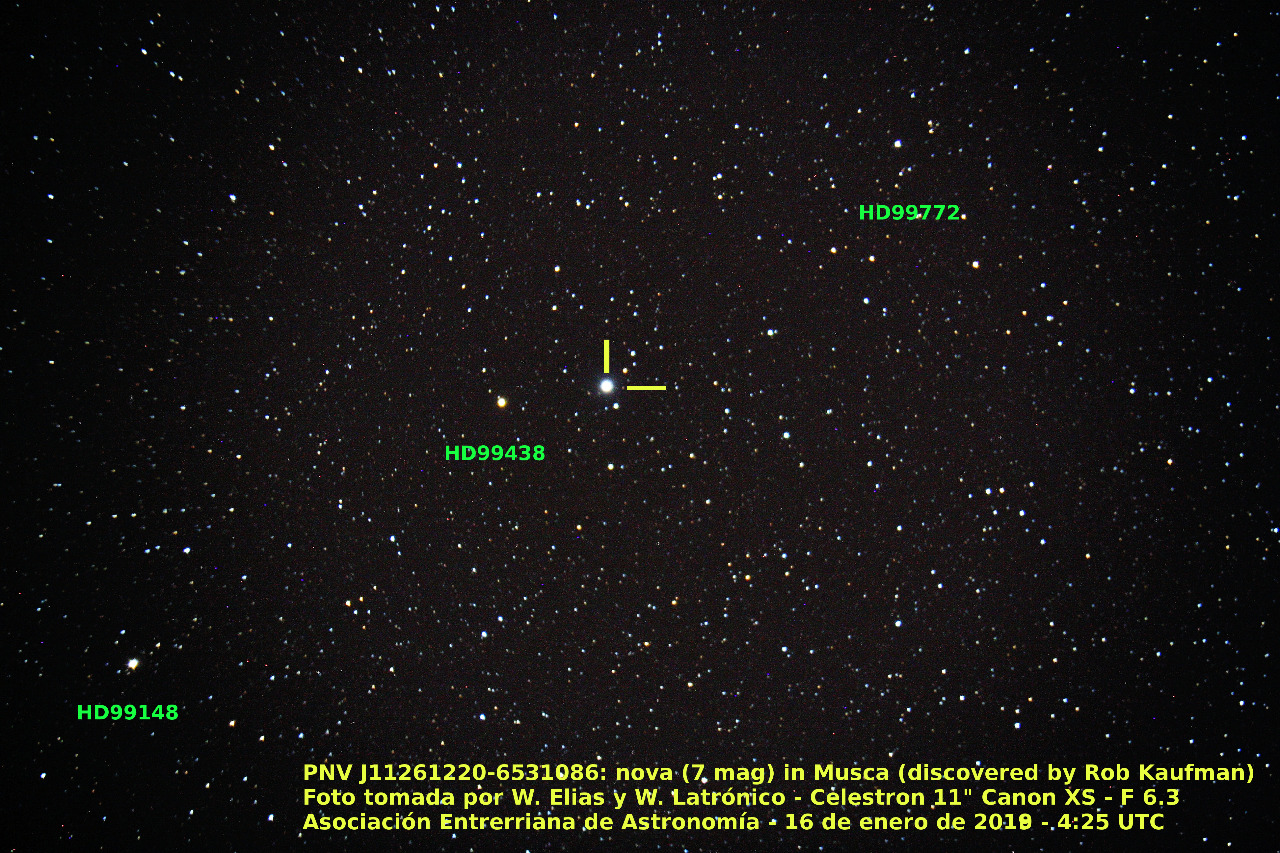
Nova Muscae 2018

V357 Muscae was a bright nova (Nova Muscae 2018) in the constellation Musca. It was discovered on January 14, 2018 by Rob Kaufman of Bright, Victoria, Australia with a magnitude of 7.0.

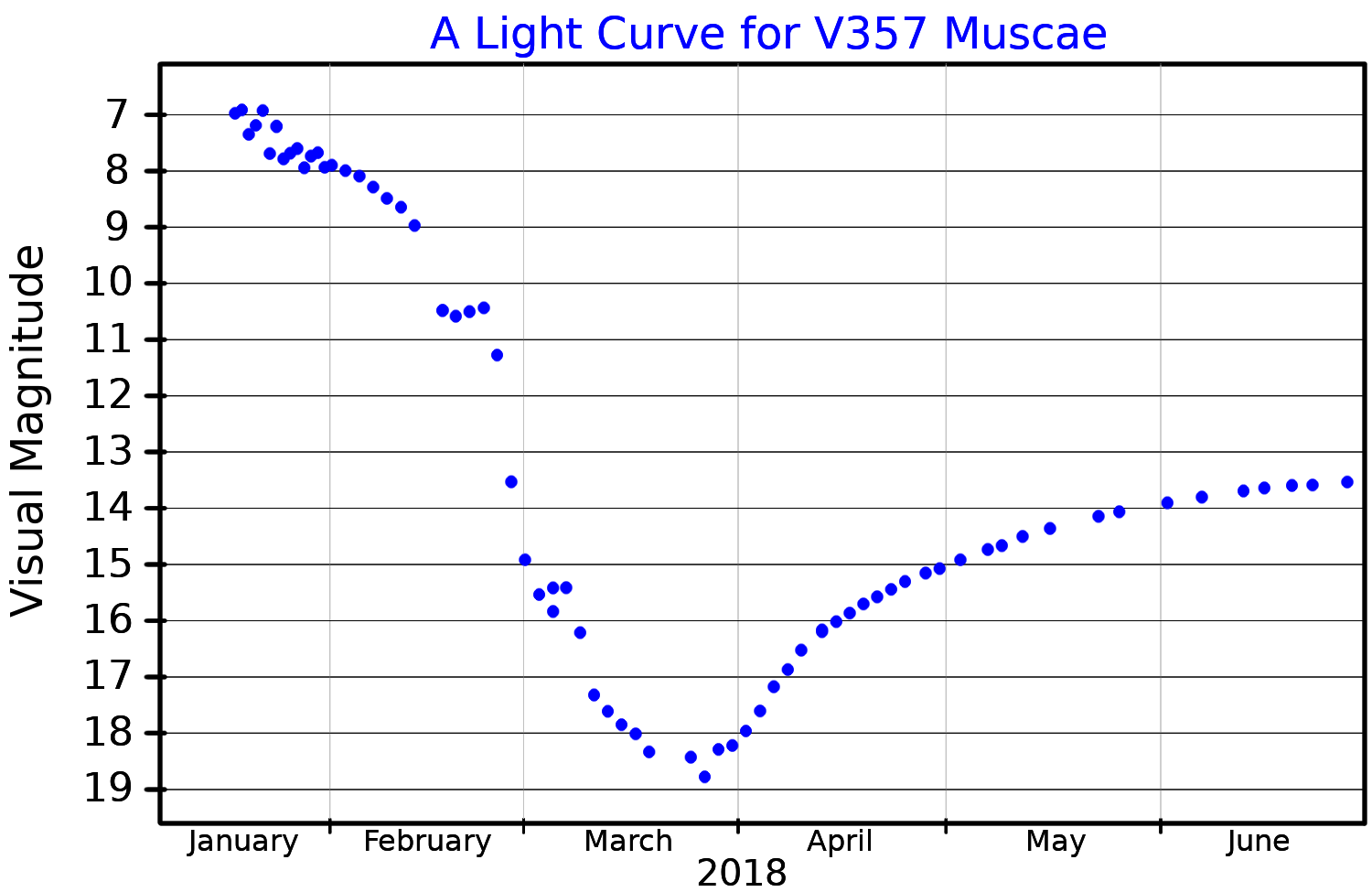
A visual band light curve for V357 Muscae, plotted from data published by Walter (2018)

As well as being observed optically, the nova was also detected at radio wavelengths using the Australia Telescope Compact Array.

== See also ==
- List of novae in the Milky Way galaxy

== Sources ==
- PNV J11261220-6531086: nova (7 mag) in Musca (discovered by Rob Kaufman)
- CBAT "Transient Object Followup Reports"
- CBET 4472 "NOVA MUSCAE 2018" (access limited)
- "Alert Notice 609: Nova Muscae 2018 - PNV J11261220-6531086"
