= Royal Astronomical Society of Canada =

Canadian learned society

- Abbreviation: RASC
- Formation: 1868
- Type: Nonprofit
- Purpose: promote astronomy and allied sciences
- Headquarters: Toronto, Ontario
- Location: Canada
- Members: 4500 members, 30 centres
- Official language: English, French
- President: Michael Watson
- Main organ: JRASC
- Staff: 4
- Website: www.rasc.ca

The Royal Astronomical Society of Canada (RASC) is a national, non-profit, charitable organization devoted to the advancement of astronomy and related sciences. At present, there are 30 local branches of the Society, called Centres, in towns and cities across the country from St. John's, Newfoundland, to Victoria, British Columbia, and as far north as Whitehorse, Yukon. There are about 3800 members from coast to coast to coast, and internationally. The membership is composed primarily of amateur astronomers and also includes numerous professional astronomers and astronomy educators. The RASC is the Canadian equivalent of the British Astronomical Association.

== History ==
The RASC has its original roots in Toronto, Ontario, Canada, where in 1868 a group of friends began meeting as part of the "Toronto Astronomical Club." The club was formally incorporated as "The Astronomical and Physical Society of Toronto" in 1890, and this is considered the founding date of the Society. The club grew over time, and by 1900, surrounding communities were affiliated with the group. On 1903 March 3, the club was renamed to "The Royal Astronomical Society of Canada" after petitioning King Edward VII to use the prefix "Royal" in the group's name. At the time it had 120 members. In the more than a century since its formal incorporation, the RASC has expanded across Canada with Centres in 30 cities, reaching every province of Canada with the exception of Prince Edward Island.

== Organization ==
=== Mandate ===
The RASC mandate is five-fold:

1. to stimulate interest and to promote and increase knowledge in astronomy and related sciences;
2. to acquire and maintain equipment, libraries, and other property necessary for the pursuit of its aims;
3. to publish journals, books, and other material containing information on the progress of astronomy and the work of the Society;
4. to receive and administer gifts, donations, and bequests from members of the Society and others;
5. to make contributions and render assistance to individuals and institutions engaged in the study and advancement of astronomy.

=== Society Office ===
The RASC employs four staff, working in or out of its office in Toronto.

=== Board of Directors ===
- President (3-year term as director; 1-year renewable term as President)
- First Vice-President (3-year term as director; 1-year renewable term as First Vice-President; Chair of Publications Committee and Chair of Constitution Committee)
- Second Vice-President (3-year term as director; 1-year renewable term as Second Vice-President; Chair of Nominating Committee)
- Treasurer (1-year term, Chair of Finance Committee; need not be, but usually is, a director)
- Secretary (3-year term as director; 1-year term)
- Up to nine directors in total, including above-described officers
- Executive Director (employee of the RASC; not a director, but regularly attends board meetings)

=== National Council ===
Before the introduction of the Canada Not-for-profit Act, the RASC was governed by a National Council. It is now governed by an elected Board of Directors.

Centre Representatives

- At least one representative from each Centre

Past Presidents

- Immediate Past President

Editors

- Observer's Handbook Editor (5-year term)
- Journal Editor (5-year term)
- Observer's Calendar Editor (5-year term)
- Bulletin Editor (5-year term)

Staff (Non-voting)

- Finance Officer

Permanent Committees (Chairs)

- Astroimaging
- Awards (Past President)
- Constitution (1st Vice-President)
- Education and Public Outreach
- Finance (Treasurer)
- Fundraising
- History
- Information Technology
- Light-Pollution Abatement
- Membership and Development
- Nominating (2nd Vice-President)
- Observing
- Publications (1st Vice-President)

=== Conduct of Business ===
The RASC conducts business through a Board of Directors, which meets regularly once a month. Meetings follow Robert's Rules of Order and are governed by the By-Laws of the Society.

Before the COVID epidemic, the Board met twice at the Society's General Assembly (GA), which traditionally was held on a weekend in May. The GA, which in recent years has been held virtually, was hosted pre-pandemic by one of the Centres, alternating between eastern and western Canada.

== Centres ==
Centres of the Society conduct a variety of activities of interest to their members and to the public. At regular meetings, well-known professional and amateur astronomers give lectures and presentations on a variety of topics of current interest. In addition, there are study and special-interest groups. Most Centres publish their own newsletters and hold their own group-observing events. Some members take part in regular observations of variable stars, lunar occultations, sunspots, meteors, comets, and other phenomena; others develop special skills such as astroimaging at workshops.

=== Outreach ===
Most Centres have public education programs, including special outreach star nights when the public is given an opportunity to look through a telescope courtesy of a RASC volunteer. In 2009, the International Year of Astronomy, many Centres were instrumental in organizing events of educational astronomy outreach for their local communities. The RASC's Light-Pollution Abatement Committee also administers Canada's Dark-sky preserve program, working with provincial and national parks to create management agreements to preserve the darkness of the nighttime sky.

=== Resources ===
Many Centres have observing equipment, libraries, and observing locations. For example, the Victoria Centre has telescopes and a large library of books and periodicals available to members in good standing. Additionally the Victoria Centre built and operates the "RASC Victoria Centre Observatory (RASC VCO)" which is located at the Dominion Astrophysical Observatory. The Society has recently purchased a robotic telescope.

== Publications and awards ==
The RASC publishes a number of books and periodicals, and issues awards to recognize accomplishments in astronomy and outreach activities.

=== Recurring Publications ===
The annual Observer's Handbook (2021: ISBN 978-1-927879-23-8) can be found in observatory control rooms and astronomers' reference shelves worldwide. Published in the autumn of the year, the 352-page Handbook contains detailed information on astronomical events in the upcoming year and is an in-depth reference of significant astronomical data such as observing techniques, physical constants, and optical properties of telescopes. The first two editions were published in 1907 and 1908, respectively. For the following two years information from the Observer's Handbook was integrated into the main Journal, but it was decided eventually that the Handbook return to circulation. The 3rd edition of the Observer's Handbook was published in January 1911, with Editor C. A. Chant aiming to publish the 1912 edition in the autumn of that year. The 110th edition was published in 2017, covering events in 2018. In addition, for the first time, a USA Edition was created for the American audience, in cooperation with the Astronomical League. The publication is currently in its 113th edition published in 2020, covering the events of 2021.

Editors of the Observer's Handbook
Name	Position	Editions
C. A. Chant	Editor	1907–1957
Frank S. Hogg	Assistant Editor	1939–1951
Ruth J. Northcott	Assistant Editor Editor	1952–1957 1958–1970
John R. Percy	Editor	1971–1981
Roy L. Bishop	Editor	1982–2000
Rajiv Gupta	Editor	2001–2006
Patrick Kelly	Editor	2007–2011
David M.F. Chapman	Editor	2012–2016
James S. Edgar	Assistant Editor Editor	2003–2016 2017–
Chris Malicki	Assistant Editor	2018--

The Journal of the Royal Astronomical Society of Canada (ISSN 0035-872X) (bib. code - JRASC), continuously published since 1907, is a bi-monthly periodical that features articles about Canadian astronomers, activities of the RASC and its Centres, and peer-reviewed research papers.

The Observer's Calendar (2017: ISBN 978-1-927879-07-8) features photos of an astronomical subject taken by amateur astronomers using CCD and other camera equipment on amateur instruments. Each photograph is given an informative caption along with comprehensive astronomical data for dates throughout each month.

Explore the Universe Guide; An Introduction to the RASC ETU Certificate Program (ISBN 978-1-927879-09-2) is a book for the casual backyard astronomer who is thinking about getting serious.

== Leadership ==
- 1890–1894 – C. Carpmael
- 1895 – L. W. Smith
- 1896–1897 – J. A. Paterson
- 1898–1899 – A. Harvey
- 1900–1902 – G. E. Lumsden
- 1902–1903 – R. F. Stupart
- 1904–1907 – C. A. Chant
- 1908–1909 – W. B. Musson
- 1910–1911 – A. T. DeLury
- 1912–1913 – L. B. Stewart
- 1914–1915 – John Stanley Plaskett
- 1916–1917 – A. D. Watson
- 1918–1919 – A. F. Miller
- 1920–1921 – J. R. Collins
- 1922–1923 – W. E. W. Jackson
- 1924–1925 – R. M. Stewart
- 1926–1927 – A. F. Hunter
- 1928–1929 – W. E. Harper
- 1930–1931 – Harold Reynolds Kingston
- 1932–1933 – R. K. Young
- 1934–1935 – L. Gilchrist
- 1936–1937 – R. E. DeLury
- 1938–1939 – W. Findlay
- 1940 – J. A. Pearce
- 1941–1942 – Frank Scott Hogg
- 1943–1944 – A. V. Douglas
- 1945–1946 – A. E. Johns
- 1947–1948 – J. W. Campbell
- 1949–1950 – A. Thompson
- 1951–1952 – Carlyle Smith Beals
- 1953–1954 – J. F. Heard
- 1955–1957 – R. M. Petrie
- 1957–1959 – Helen Sawyer Hogg
- 1959–1960 – Andrew McKellar
- 1960–1962 – Peter Mackenzie Millman
- 1962–1964 – R. J. Northcott
- 1964–1966 – K. O. Wright
- 1966–1968 – M. M. Thomson
- 1968–1970 – J. E. Kennedy
- 1970–1972 – H. Simard
- 1972–1974 – J. L. Locke
- 1974–1976 – J. D. Fernie
- 1976–1978 – Alan H. Batten
- 1978–1980 – J. R. Percy
- 1980–1982 – Ian Halliday
- 1982–1984 – Franklin Loehde
- 1984–1986 – R. L. Bishop
- 1986–1988 – Mary Grey
- 1988–1990 – Lloyd A. Higgs
- 1990–1992 – Damien Lemay
- 1992–1994 – Peter Broughton
- 1994–1996 – Doug Hube
- 1996–1998 – Doug George
- 1998–2000 – Randy Attwood
- 2000–2002 – Robert Frederick Garrison
- 2002–2004 – Dr. Rajiv Gupta
- 2004–2006 – Peter Jedicke
- 2006–2008 – Scott Young
- 2008–2010 – Dave Lane
- 2010–2012 – Mary Lou Whitehorne
- 2012–2014 – Glenn Hawley
- 2014–2016 – James Edgar
- 2016–2017 – Craig Levine
- 2017–2018 – Colin Haig
- 2018–2020 – Chris Gainor
- 2020–2022 – Robyn Foret

== See also ==
- Société d'astronomie de Montréal
- List of astronomical societies
