= Giovanni Battista Lacchini =

Italian astronomer

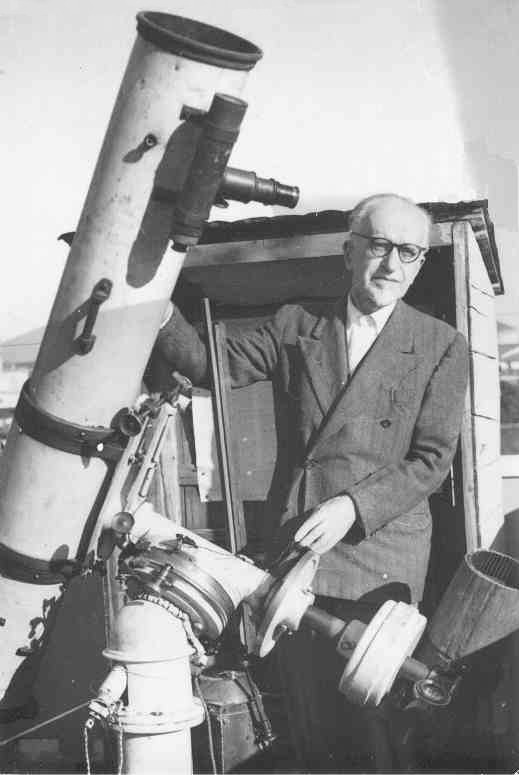
- Giovanni Battista Lacchini with his telescope
- Born: 20 May 1884; Faenza, Italy
- Died: 6 January 1967 (aged 82); Faenza, Italy
- Scientific career
- Fields: Astronomy

Giovanni Battista Lacchini (20 May 1884 – 6 January 1967) was an Italian astronomer.

He is primarily noted for his work in the study of variable stars. He published over 100 works, including papers in "Astronomische Nachrichten" and "Memorie della Società astronomica italiana". He was originally a postal worker.

== Awards and honors ==
The Giovanni Battista Lacchini Award is named for him. The Lunar crater Lacchini on the far-side of the Moon and the Mars-crossing asteroid 145962 Lacchini were also named in his honor.

== Bibliography ==
- "Atlante celeste con 43 carte", Bologna, 1948
- "Atlante celeste spettroscopico", Faenza, 1958.
