= American Association of Variable Star Observers =

Organization of amateur and professional astronomers

The American Association of Variable Star Observers (AAVSO) is an international nonprofit organization. Founded in 1911, the organization focuses on coordinating, analyzing, publishing, and archiving variable star observations made largely by amateur astronomers. The AAVSO creates records that establish light curves depicting the variation in brightness of a star over time. The AAVSO makes these records available to professional astronomers, researchers, and educators.

Professional astronomers do not have the resources to monitor every variable star. Hence, astronomy is one of the few sciences where amateurs can make significant contributions to research. In 2011, the 100th year of the AAVSO's existence, the twenty-millionth variable star observation was received into their database. The AAVSO International Database (AID) has stored over thirty-five million observations as of 2019. The organization receives nearly 1,000,000 observations annually from an estimated amount of 2,000 professional and amateur observers, and is quoted regularly in scientific journals. The International Variable Star Index (VSX) website, maintained by the AAVSO, is cataloging (as of November 2023) 10,300,863 variable stars.

The AAVSO is also very active in education and public outreach. They routinely hold training workshops for citizen science and publish papers with amateurs as co-authors. In the 1990s, the AAVSO developed the Hands-On Astrophysics curriculum, now known as Variable Star Astronomy (with support from the National Science Foundation [NSF]). In 2009, the AAVSO was awarded a three-year $800,000 grant from the NSF to run Citizen Sky, a pro-am collaboration project examining the 2009-2011 eclipse of the star epsilon Aurigae.

The AAVSO headquarters was originally located at the residence of its founder William T. Olcott in Norwich, Connecticut.

Minor Planet (8900) AAVSO is named after the organization.

== History ==
After AAVSO's incorporation in 1918, it unofficially moved to Harvard College Observatory, which later served as the official AAVSO headquarters (1931–1953). Thereafter, it moved around Cambridge before their first building was purchased in 1985: the Clinton B. Ford Astronomical Data and Research Center. In 2007, the AAVSO purchased and moved into the recently vacated premises of Sky & Telescope magazine.

As of September 16, 2022, the Executive Director of the AAVSO is Brian Kloppenborg. Before he assumed this role, Kathy Spirer worked in this capacity for nine months, following the resignation of Styliani ("Stella") Kafka -who was in charge from February 2015 till the ember months of 2021. She succeeded Arne Henden. The previous director of the AAVSO for many decades was Janet Mattei, who died in March 2004 of leukemia.

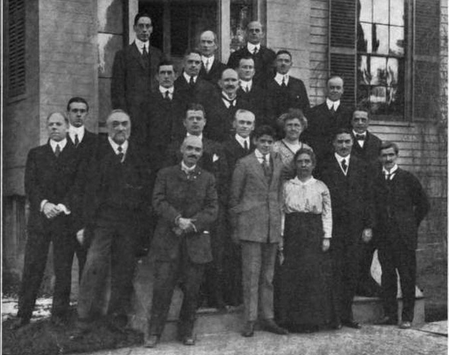
AAVSO members in 1916, meeting at Harvard College Observatory. The two women in the photograph are Ida E. Woods (front row) and Annie Jump Cannon (behind Woods).

== Current and former members ==
Recorders and Directors

- William T. Olcott (1911–1918, Founder)
- Leon Campbell (1915–1949)
- Margaret Mayall (1949–1973)
- Janet A. Mattei (AAVSO Director 1973–2003)
- Elizabeth O. Waagen (2003–2005)
- Arne Henden (2005–2015)
- Styliani ("Stella") Kafka (2015–2021)
- Kathy Spirer (2022)
- Brian Kloppenborg (2022–)

Presidents

- David B. Pickering (1917–1918)
- Harold C. Bancroft Jr. (1918–1919)
- Leon Campbell (1919–1922)
- Anne S. Young (1922–1924)
- J. Ernest G. Yalden (1924–1926)
- Charles C. Godfrey (1926–1927)
- David B. Pickering (1927–1929)
- Alice H. Farnsworth (1929–1931)
- Harriet W. Bigelow (1931–1933)
- Ernest W. Brown (1933–1935)
- Harlow Shapley (1935–1937)
- Charles W. Elmer (1937–1939)
- Helen S. Hogg (1939–1941)
- Dirk Brouwer (1941–1943)
- Roy A. Seely (1943–1945)
- Charles H. Smiley (1945–1947)
- Marjorie Williams (1947–1948)
- David W. Rosebrugh (1948–1949)
- Neal J. Heines (1949–1951)
- Martha Stahr Carpenter (1951–1954)
- Cyrus F. Fernald (1954–1956)
- Richard W. Hamilton (1956–1958)
- Ralph N. Buckstaff (1958–1960)
- E. Dorrit Hoffleit (1961–1963)
- George Diedrich (1963–1965)
- Edward G. Oravec (1965–1967)
- Charles M. Good (1971–1973)
- Casper H. Hossfield (1969–1971)
- Frank J. DeKinder (1967–1969)
- Charles E. Scovil (1973–1975)
- George L. Fortier (1975–1977)
- Marvin E. Baldwin (1977–1979)
- Carl A. Anderson (1979–1981)
- Arthur J. Stokes (1981–1983)
- Ernst H. Mayer (1983–1985)
- Thomas R. Williams (1985–1987)
- Keith H. Danskin (1987–1989)
- John R. Percy (1989–1991)
- Martha Locke Hazen (1991–1992)
- Thomas R. Williams (1992–1993)
- Wayne M. Lowder (1993–1995)
- Albert V. Holm (1995–1997)
- Gary Walker (1997–1999)
- Lee Anne Willson (1999–2001)
- Daniel H. Kaiser (2001–2003)
- William G. Dillon (2003–2005)
- David B. Williams (2005–2007)
- Paula Szkody (2007–2009)
- Jaime R. Garcia (2009–2011)
- Mario E. Motta (2011–2013)
- Jennifer (Jeno) Sokoloski (2013–2015)
- Kristine M. Larsen (2015–2018)
- Gordon Myers (2018–2021)
- David Cowall (2021–2024)

Other members

The AAVSO currently has over 2,000 members and observers, with approximately half of them from outside the United States. This list only consists of those with Wikipedia pages.

- Leah B. Allen Charter Member
- Joseph Ashbrook
- Rosina Dafter
- Radha Gobinda Chandra
- Robert Evans (AAVSO Supernova Search Committee Chairperson 1985–2005)
- Clinton B. Ford
- Russell Merle Genet
- Pamela L. Gay
- Edward A. Halbach
- Phoebe Waterman Haas
- Carolyn Hurless
- Richard Huziak
- Albert F. A. L. Jones
- Giovanni B. Lacchini
- Helen Lines
- Richard D. Lines
- Ben Mayer
- Ruth J. Northcott
- Arto Oksanen
- M. Daniel Overbeek
- Leslie Peltier
- Lois Tripp Slocum
- Peter Francis Williams
- Ida E. Woods

== Publications ==
- AAVSO Alert Notice.
- Journal of the American Association of Variable Star Observers (JAAVSO).
- AAVSO Circular was published from 1970 until 2000 and edited by John E. Bortle.

== See also ==
- List of astronomical societies
