= Journal of the Royal Astronomical Society of Canada =

- Discipline: Astronomy
- Language: English, French
- Edited by: Nicole Mortillaro

Publication details
- Former names: Transactions of the Astronomical and Physical Society of Toronto; Royal Astronomical Society of Canada Selected Papers and Proceedings; Royal Astronomical Society of Canada Transactions
- History: 1907–present
- Publisher: Royal Astronomical Society of Canada (Canada)
- Frequency: Bimonthly
- Open access: After one year

Standard abbreviations
- ISO 4: J. R. Astron. Soc. Can.

Indexing
- CODEN: JRASA2
- ISSN: 0035-872X
- OCLC no.: 1586913

Links
- Journal homepage; Online archive

The Journal of the Royal Astronomical Society of Canada (JRASC, French: Journal de la Société royale d'astronomie du Canada) is a trade magazine and scientific journal, distributed bimonthly to members of the Royal Astronomical Society of Canada. It primarily contains news reports, information about society activities, popular science articles about astronomy, and advice for amateur astronomers. A small fraction of its articles are peer-reviewed research papers.

JRASC was founded in 1907, with Clarence Chant as editor. It was preceded by the Transactions of the Astronomical and Physical Society of Toronto (1890–1901), the Royal Astronomical Society of Canada Selected Papers and Proceedings (1902–1903), and the Royal Astronomical Society of Canada Transactions (1904–1905).

The Astrophysics Data System contains issues older than one year back to the journal's foundation.
