= Sarah L. Krizmanich Telescope =

University of Notre Dame campus

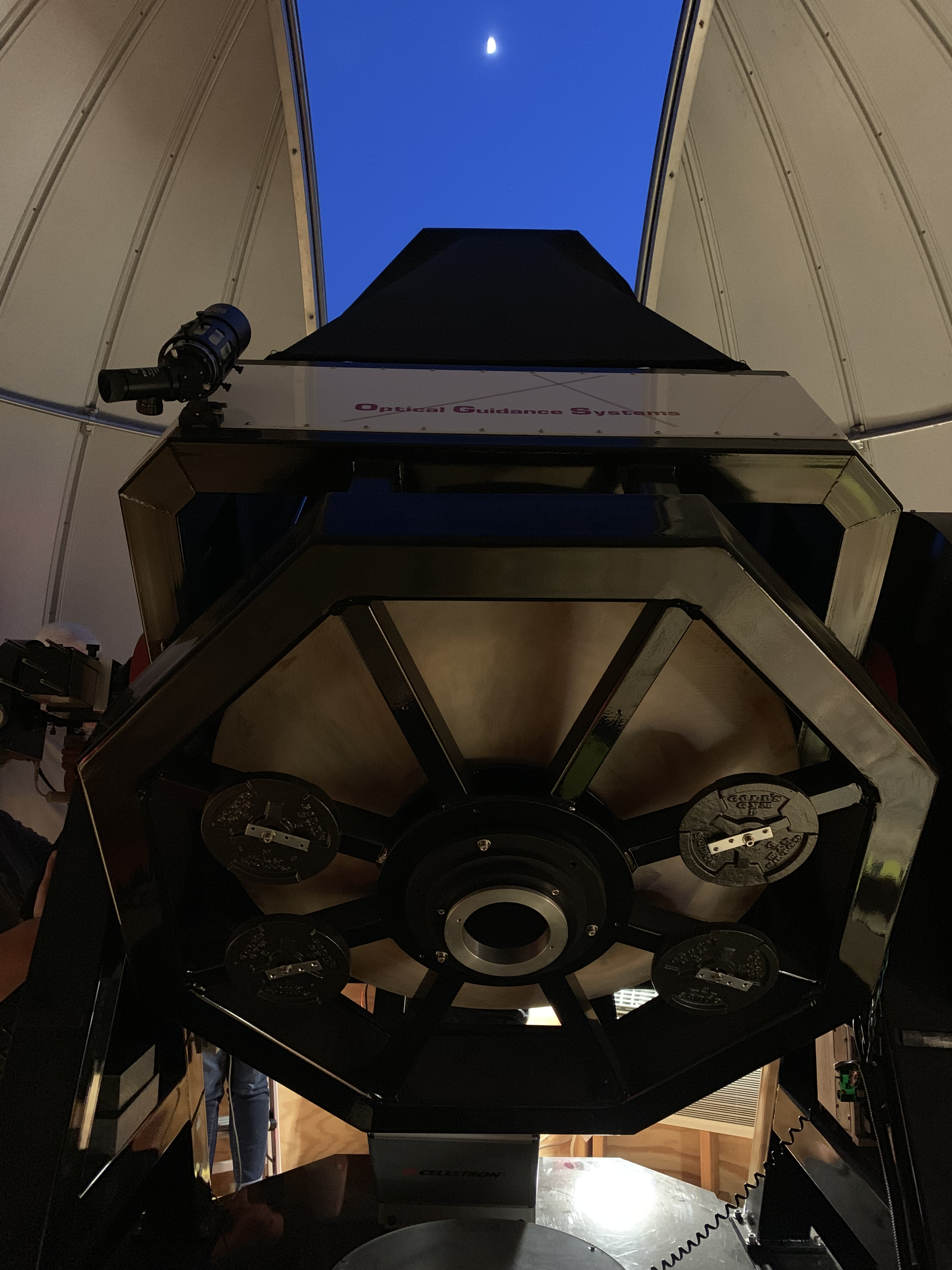
- Location: Jordan Hall of Science, University of Notre Dame, du lac, Notre Dame, IN
- Coordinates: 41°42′01″N 86°13′54″W
- Organization: University of Notre Dame, Optical Guidance Systems
- Altitude: 225 m (738 ft)
- Wavelength: Visible
- First light: Sep 21, 2013
- Diameter: 0.8 m (31.5 in)
- Focal length: f/8 (6.4 m)
- Mounting: Altazimuth
- Enclosure: Ash Dome, Plainfield, IL
- Website: https://physics.nd.edu/

The Sarah L. Krizmanich Telescope (SLKT) is located at the Jordan Hall of Science on the University of Notre Dame campus. The SLKT is a 0.8-m Optical Guidance Systems reflecting telescope and it is used for undergraduate astronomy and astrophysics research and teaching. Discoveries concerning the nature of cataclysmic variable stars, and a potential exoplanet, have been obtained using the Krizmanich Telescope.

== Installation and memorial ==
In November 2003, construction of the Jordan Hall of Science began at the University of Notre Dame Campus. The $70 million, 200,000 square foot facility was underwritten by 1969 Notre Dame graduate John W. "Jay" Jordan III of Chicago. The new building featured laboratories, classrooms, two large lecture halls, faculty offices, a greenhouse, and an astronomical observatory. A planetarium, or "digital visualization theater" (DVT) was also included in the new building. Described as a "neo Gothic" structure, the Jordan Hall of Science was dedicated in September, 2006.

Late Notre Dame professor Terrence Rettig (1946-2021) played an important role in establishing the campus observatory and DVT. According to Notre Dame professor Peter Garnavich, Rettig was "the founder of astronomy at Notre Dame."

In 2013, the 0.8 meter (32 inch) Sarah L. Krizmanich Telescope was installed in a rooftop observatory at the Jordan Hall of Science. The telescope is one of the largest in Indiana and was built for undergraduate research and as a testing instrument for new instrumentation. The telescope is conveniently located on campus for student use.

The telescope was a gift from the Krizmanich family and is named in memory of Notre Dame student Sarah L. Krizmanich. According to her sister Amy Krizmanich, "Sarah had a love for teaching and a passion for helping others."

== Specifications ==
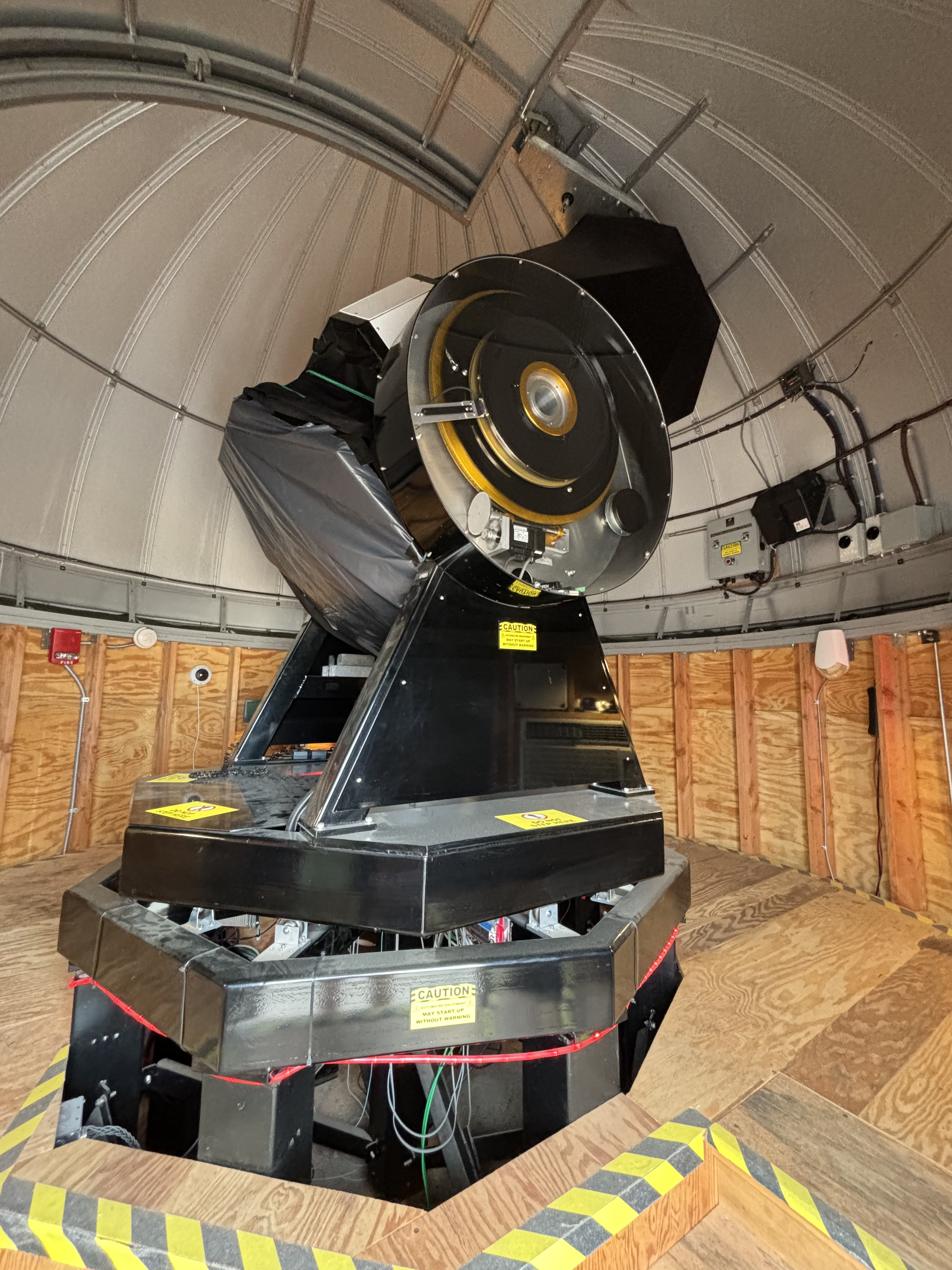
Telescope is an Optical Guidance Systems 0.8 m Ritchey-Chretien reflector. Image displays altitude gear behind a clear cover.

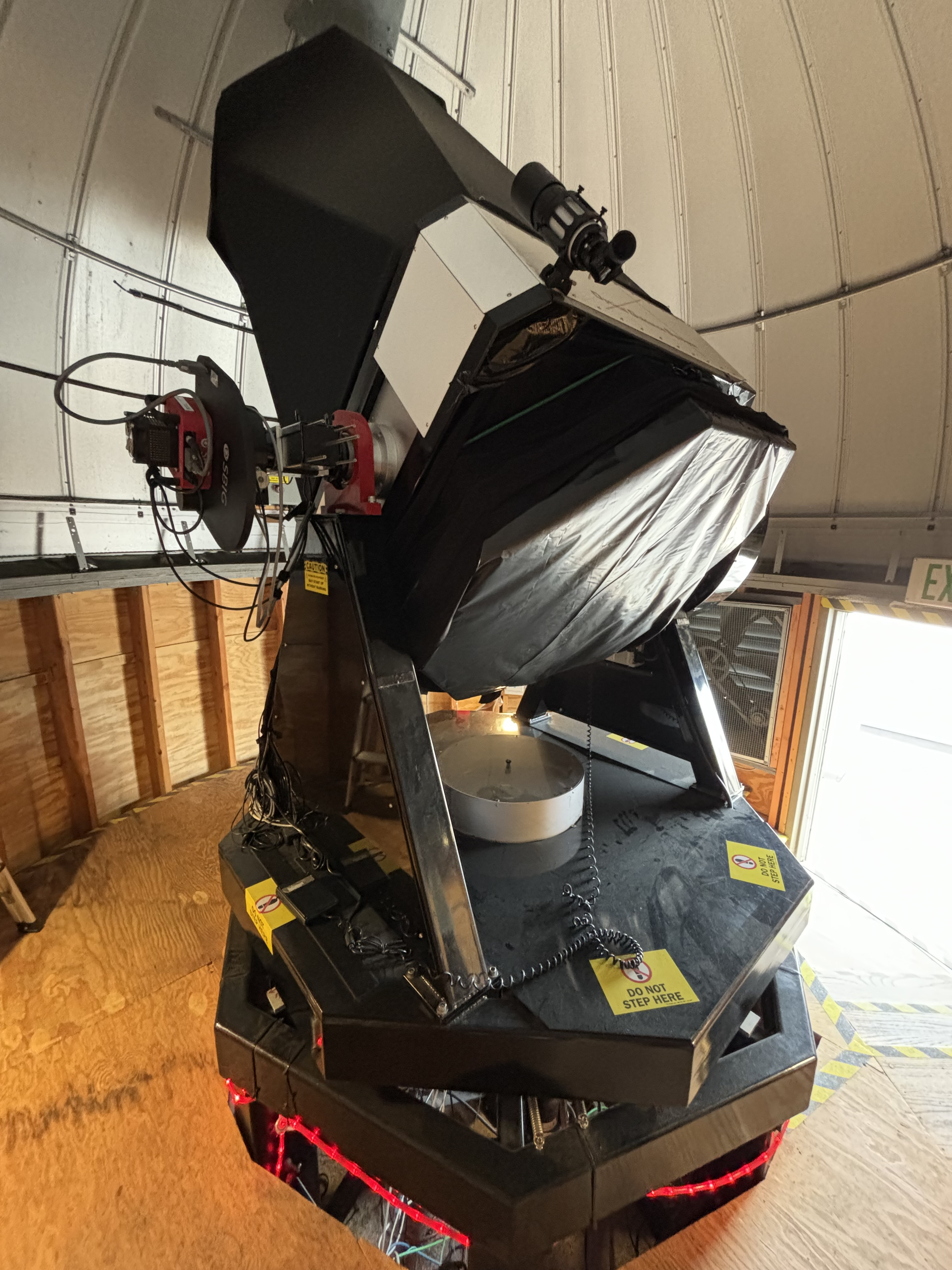
A CCD camera is mounted on the Nasymth focus position of the telescope mount.

Designed by Optical Guidance Systems, the 0.8 m, f/8 Krizmanich Telescope is a reflecting telescope featuring a Ritchey-Chretien (RC) optical system. An RC system is designed for imaging with a CCD camera. The telescope employs an altazimuth mount. Light collected by the telescope mirrors can be diverted towards a sensor or eyepiece located either behind the primary mirror or, using a third mirror, out along the altitude axis towards the side of the telescope. This position along the altitude axis is termed a Nasmyth focus and is used for many large observatory telescope such as the Keck Telescopes in Hawaii. The telescope utilizes a Santa Barbara Instruments Group (SGIG) charged coupled device (CCD) camera to collect data. Colored filters are also employed to observe starlight in different wavelengths. The telescope can be equipped with an eyepiece. This configuration has been used for public astronomy-themed outreach events at Notre Dame.

The observatory, telescope, and camera are operated remotely from an adjacent workroom or from the researcher's homes.

== Research and outreach ==
In 2016, Peter Garnavich and Colin Littlefield of Notre Dame used the Krizmanich Telescope to discover an unusual dimming in the cataclysmic variable star system FO Aquarii, a binary star system featuring a white dwarf and main sequence star.

In 2018, Garnavich, Littlefield, and Robert Stiller of Notre Dame published observations of the AR Scorpii binary star system which features the first known white dwarf pulsar. The white dwarf orbits a red dwarf star in a cataclysmic variable system. Data from the Krizmanich Telescope was used to measure the slowing down of the white dwarf's rate of rotation.

The Jordan Hall of Science held a public outreach event during the rare 2012 transit of Venus. Hosted by Notre Dame professor Arielle Phillips, safe solar viewing glasses were provided along with a live broadcast of the transit displayed in a lecture hall. Although the Krizmanich Telescope was not used for this event, members of the Michiana Astronomical Society provided telescope viewing of the transit in front of Jordan Hall near the sundial. The first half of the transit, when Venus appeared in silhouette as a black disk against the bright solar surface, was visible from northern Indiana.

A "Summer Stargazing" outreach event held on July 6, 2018, at the Notre Dame campus drew an estimated 1,500 people. The event, hosted by Notre Dame professor Jonathan Crass, used the Krizmanich Telescope and six other smaller telescopes set up on the rooftop observatory to provide views of the night sky for attendees. Crass also founded the Notre Dame Our Universe Revealed series of public lectures.

As an undergraduate student at Notre Dame, McKenna Leichty performed research using the Krizmanich Telescope under the tutelage of Peter Garnavich. Observations of cataclysmic variable V808 Aurigae obtained with the Krizmanich Telescope revealed the presence of a potential 7 Jupiter-mass exoplanet in an elongated, eccentric orbit about the white dwarf/red dwarf binary system. The exoplanet exhibits an orbital period of about 11 years and is named V808 Aurigae b.

== See also ==
- Napoleon III Telescope (University of Notre Dame)
- Peter Garnavich
- List of astronomical observatories
- List of exoplanets discovered in 2024

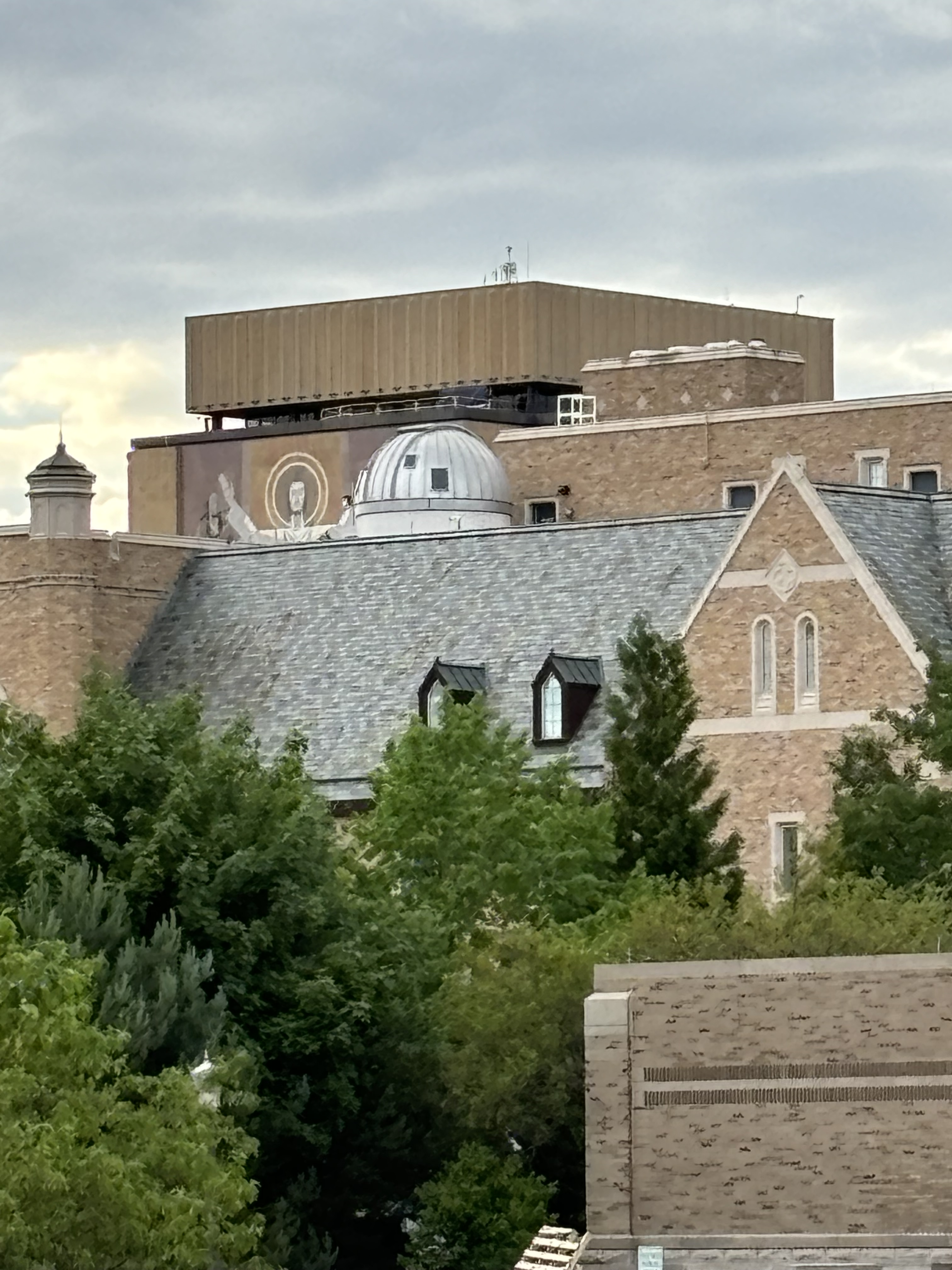
Jordan Hall Observatory dome housing the Krizmanich Telescope.
