= BG Canis Minoris =

Variable star in the constellation of Canis Minor

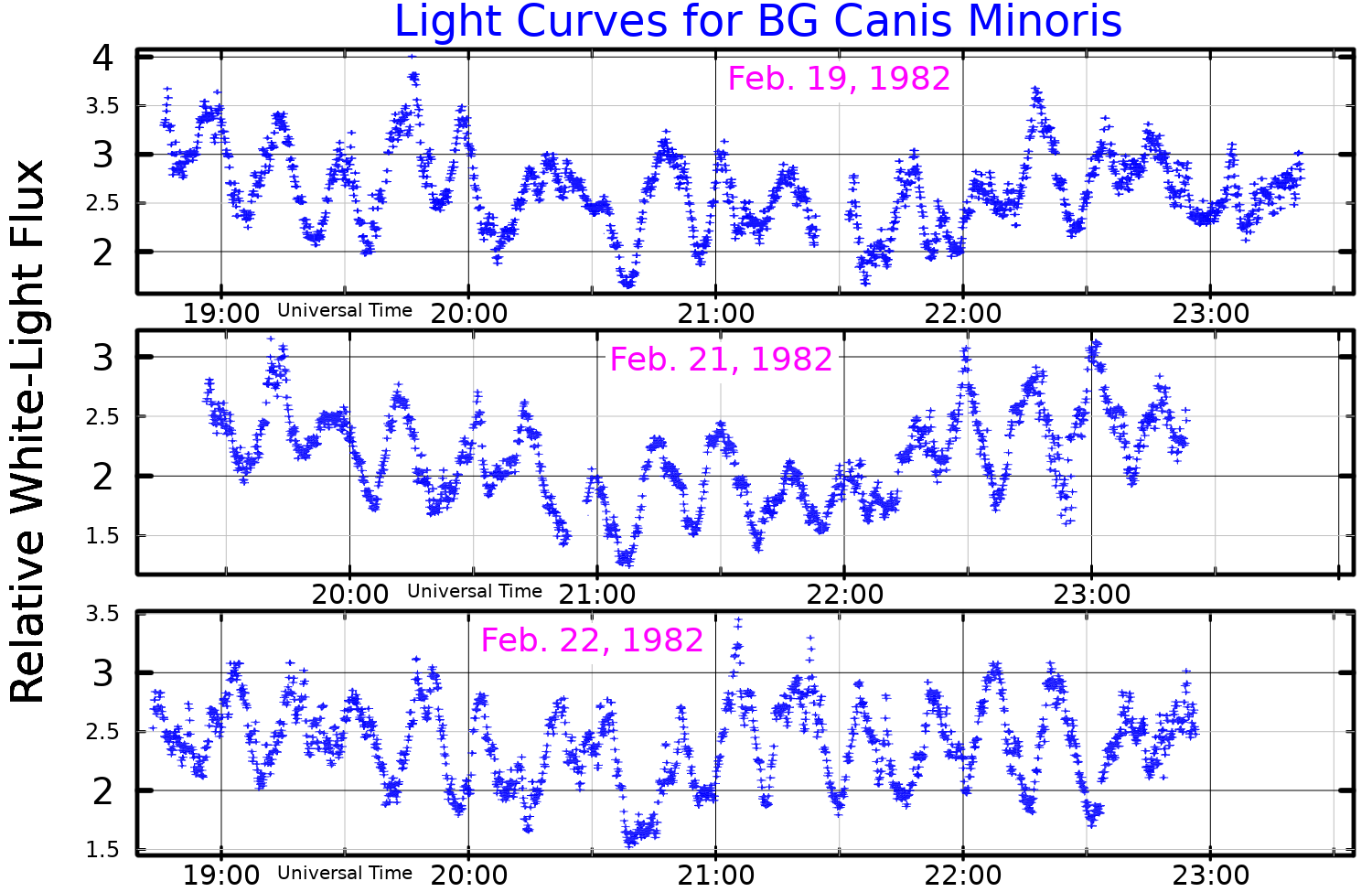
- Light curves for BG Canis Minoris, adapted from McHardy et al. (1984)

Observation data Epoch J2000 Equinox J2000
- Constellation: Canis Minor
- Right ascension: 07^{h} 31^{m} 29.008^{s}
- Declination: +09° 56′ 23.03″
- Apparent magnitude (V): 14.5 (14.7 to 15.2)

Characteristics
- Variable type: Intermediate polar

Astrometry
Proper motion (μ)	RA: −13.616 mas/yr Dec.: 3.347 mas/yr
Parallax (π)	1.1199±0.0334 mas
Distance	2,910 ± 90 ly (890 ± 30 pc)

Orbit
Period (P)	0.1349 d
Semi-major axis (a)	1.09–1.33 R_{☉}
Eccentricity (e)	0.0
Periastron epoch (T)	2,445,731.8184±12.0 HJD
Semi-amplitude (K_{1}) (primary)	75.00 km/s

Details

White dwarf
Mass	0.78+0.08 −0.07 M_{☉}

Donor star
Mass	0.38 M_{☉}

Other designations
- 3A 0729+103, BG CMi, 2MASS J07312900+0956231

Database references
SIMBAD	data

BG Canis Minoris is a binary star system in the equatorial constellation of Canis Minor, abbreviated BG CMi. With an apparent visual magnitude that fluctuates around 14.5, it is much too faint to be visible to the naked eye. Parallax measurements provide a distance estimate of approximately 2,910 light years from the Sun.

In 1981, I. M. McHardy and associates included the X-ray source '3A 0729+103' in their Ariel 5 satellite 3A catalogue. The team used a localized search of those coordinates with the Einstein Observatory to isolate an X-ray source that matched the location of a blue-hued star with a visual magnitude of 14.5. The light curve for this star proved quite similar to other intermediate polars that had been identified as X-ray sources. The overall brightness variation of 3A 0729+103 matched a binary system with an orbital period of 194.1 minutes. It displays a more rapid variation with a period of 913 seconds, which was interpreted as related to a spin period.

The standard model for this category of variable star consists of a magnetized white dwarf in a close orbit with a cool main sequence secondary star. The Roche lobe of the secondary is overflowing, and this stream of matter is falling onto an accretion disk in orbit around the primary. X-ray observations with the EXOSAT observatory in 1984–1985 demonstrated there are two regions of emission. One of these is believed to be at the magnetic poles of the white dwarf component, while the second is located where the accretion stream is striking the white dwarf's magnetosphere. The emission at the pole is partially eclipsed by the rotation of the white dwarf.

In 1987, cyclotron radiation was discovered based on the circular polarization of its near infrared output, the first conclusive identification of this behavior for an intermediate polar. This emission confirmed the model of a magnetic white dwarf that is accreting mass. Measurements suggested a magnetic field strength of 2 to 6 MG. Changes in the rotation period over time indicate that the white dwarf is slowly being spun up due to torque from accreted matter. It has an estimated 78% of the mass of the Sun, while the donor companion has about 38%.
