= V5668 Sagittarii =

Nova star in the constellation Sagittarius

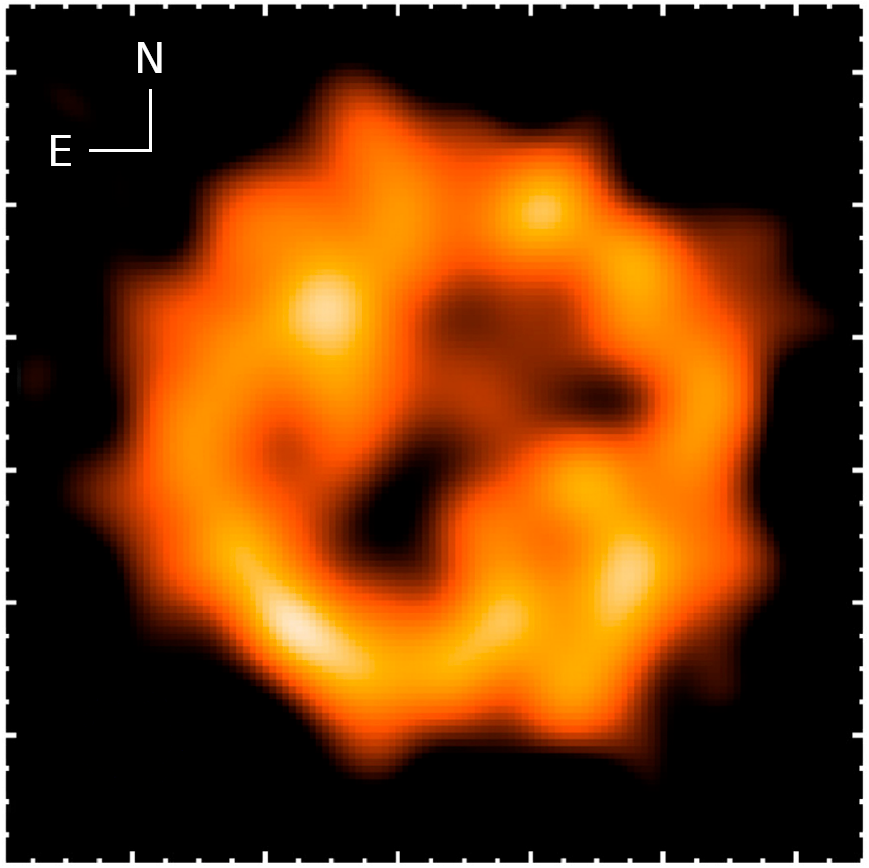
- The shell of V5668 Sagittarii imaged at 230 GHz with the ALMA. The image has been convolved with a gaussian function to make it match the resolution of the HST at the wavelength of Hα. The major tick marks are separated by 0.1 arc seconds. From Diaz et al. (2018)

Observation data Epoch J2000.0 Equinox J2000.0 (ICRS)
- Constellation: Sagittarius
- Right ascension: 18^{h} 36^{m} 56.84^{s}
- Declination: −28° 55′ 39.8″
- Apparent magnitude (V): 4.2 (max) – 16.0

Characteristics
- Variable type: Nova

Astrometry
Distance	5,020 ly (1,540 pc)

Other designations
- Nova Sagittarii 2015 b, V5668 Sgr, PNV J18365700-2855420

Database references
SIMBAD	data

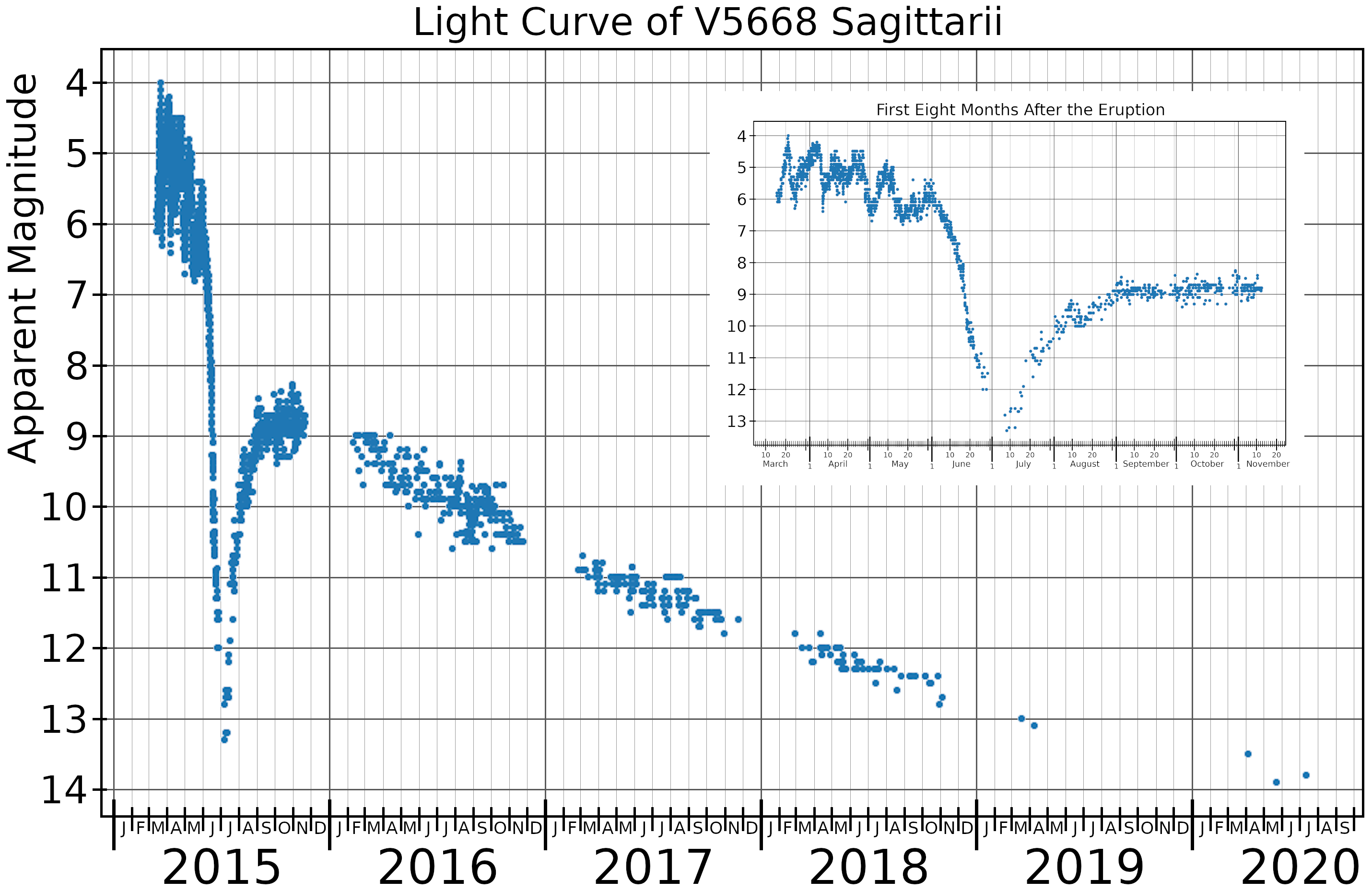
The light curve of V5668 Sagittarii, plotted from AAVSO data

V5668 Sagittarii, also known as Nova Sagittarii 2015 Number 2, was the second and brighter of two novae in the southern constellation of Sagittarius in 2015 (the first was V5667 Sagittarii, reported on 12 February 2015). It was discovered by John Seach of Chatsworth Island, New South Wales, Australia on 15 March 2015 with a DSLR patrol camera. At the time of discovery it was a 6th magnitude star. It peaked at magnitude of 4.32 on March 21, 2015, making it visible to the naked eye.

V5668 Sagittarii's peak brightness was followed by a series of fluctuations in brightness, then a strong decline of 7 magnitudes during June as the nova went through a dust formation phase. The light curve for this event is very similar to the DQ Herculis intermediate polar, and it shows a coincident oscillation in X-ray flux with a period of 71±2 s due to rotation of the white dwarf. The white dwarf and its companion star are surrounded by a dusty shell of ejected material.

In 2016 Banerjee et al. showed that 107 days after the nova outburst, its dust-dominated SED was well approximated by an 850 K blackbody spectrum. That temperature, along with infrared flux measurements, allowed them to calculate the mass of the dust shell to be 2.7 × 10^{−7} M_{☉} , and the mass of the entire shell to be 2.7 to 5.4 × 10^{−5} M_{☉} . The angular diameter of the dust shell was estimated to be 42 milliarcsec which, along with the time since outburst and the measured expansion velocity of 530 km/sec, allowed the distance, 1.54 kpc, to be calculated.

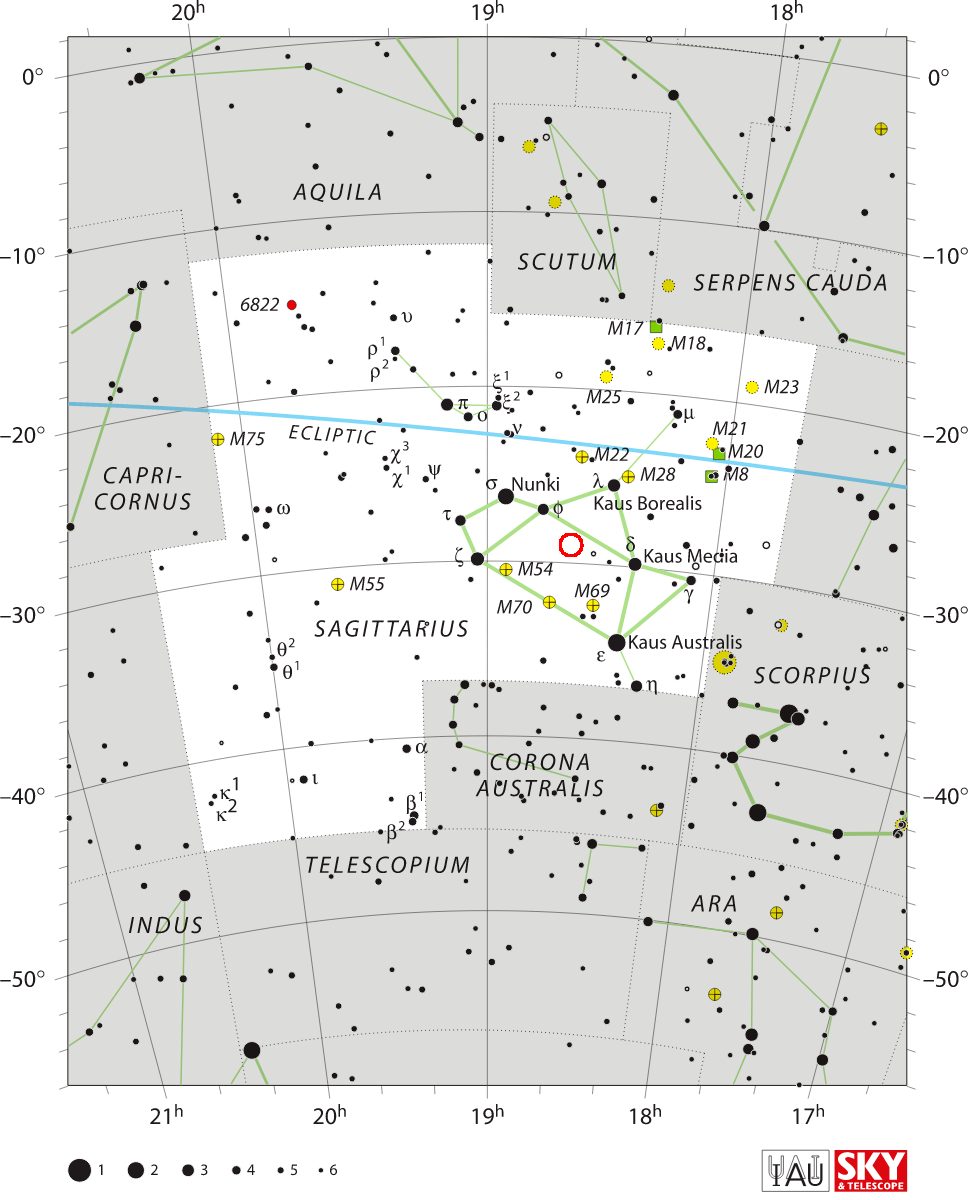
The location of V5668 Sagittarii (circled in red)

Two and a half years after the nova event, the ALMA array, operating in the 230 GHz mm-wave radio band, observed a clumpy, roughly circular nova remnant surrounding V5668 Sagittarii. It was about one half arc second in diameter at that time, and was well resolved by the interferometer.
