= Peter Garnavich =

American astromer and physicist

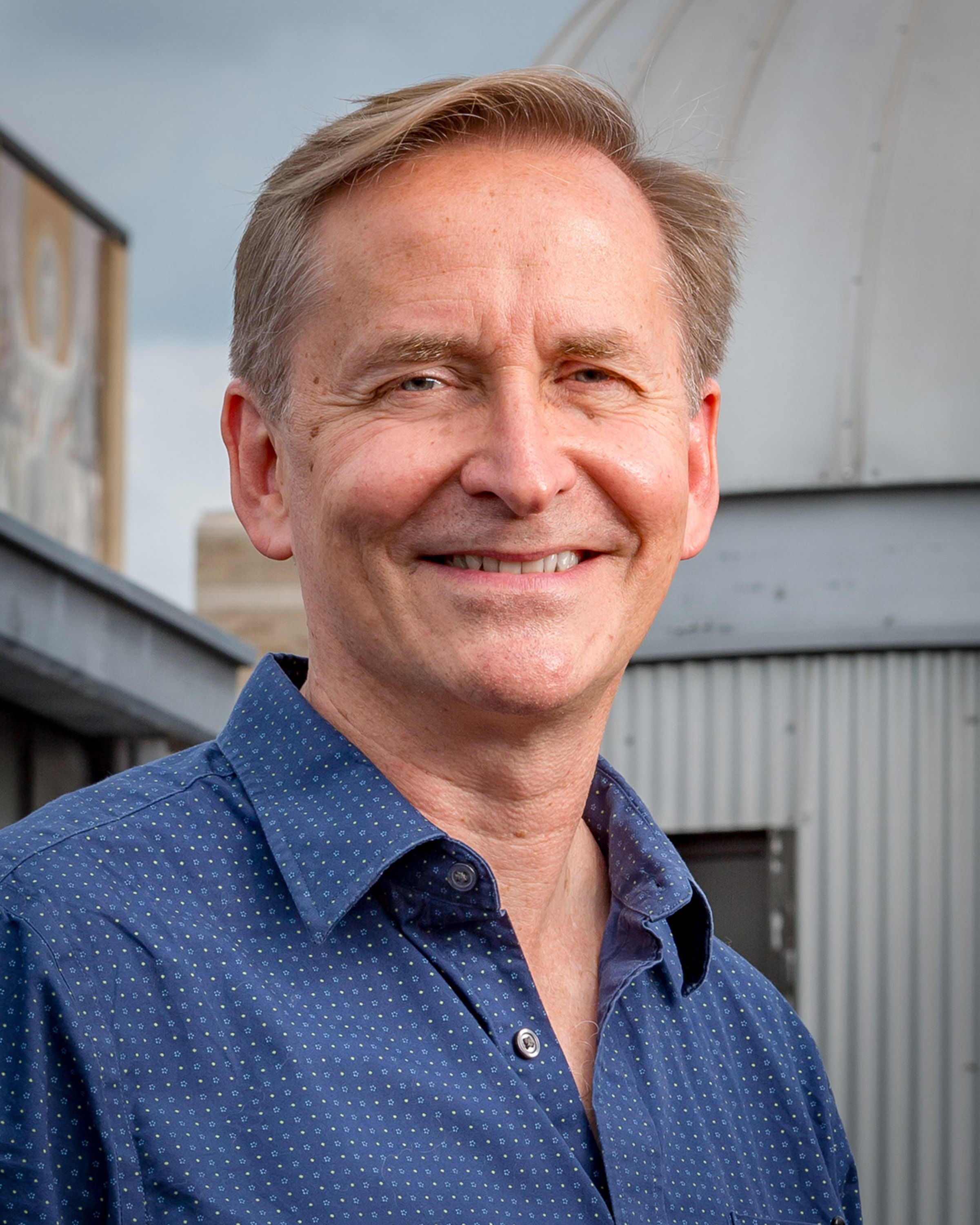
- Born: Peter Marcus Garnavich; United States
- Education: University of Maryland (1980), Massachusetts Institute of Technology (1983), University of Washington (1991)
- Spouse: Lara Arielle Phillips
- Awards: American Physical Society (2007), Gruber Prize in Cosmology (2007), American Association for the Advancement of Science (2012), Breakthrough Prize in Fundamental Physics (2015), American Astronomical Society (2024)
- Scientific career
- Workplaces: Dominion Astrophysical Observatory (1992–1995), Harvard–Smithsonian Center for Astrophysics (1995–1999), University of Notre Dame (2000-present)
- Thesis: The stellar angular correlation : clues to wide binary star properties (1991)
- Doctoral advisor: Bruce Margon
- Website: https://physics.nd.edu/people/peter-garnavich/

Peter M. Garnavich is a faculty member of the Department of Physics and Astronomy at the University of Notre Dame. His primary research area is the study of supernovae and their diversity. He has also studied gamma ray bursts and cataclysmic variable stars. Garnavich is a member of a supernova search team that contributed to the discovery of dark energy in 1998. At Notre Dame, Garnavich has developed and participated in collaborations using the Spitzer Space Telescope, the Large Binocular Telescope, the Hubble Space Telescope, and the Kepler Space Telescope. He was named a fellow of the American Astronomical Society (AAS) in 2024.

== Early life and education ==
In the 1970s, observing a partial eclipse as a boy led to Garnavich's interest in astronomy and physics. According to Garnavich, "The eclipse is what pushed me over the edge and I decided that this is what I wanted to do for the rest of my life."

Garnavich pursued amateur astronomy while in high school as a member of the American Association of Variable Star Observers (AAVSO). He independently discovered Nova Cygni 1975 and the night before obtained prediscovery photographs using Kodak Tri-X Pan emulsion film. The early rise of Nova Cygni 1975 was defined by his data combined with observations by Ben Mayer.

Garnavich earned a bachelor of science in astronomy from the University of Maryland in 1980, a master of science in physics from Massachusetts Institute of Technology (MIT) in 1983, and a Ph.D. in astronomy from the University of Washington in 1991.

== Career and research ==
Garnavich has been a co-author on over 1000 publications, an author on over 300 refereed papers, and has an h-index of 99 according to Google Scholar.

Garnavich served as a research associate at the Space Telescope Science Institute (STSI) from 1983 to 1985. He worked with Barry Lasker on the Guide Star Catalog for the Hubble Space Telescope.

Following the completion of his Ph.D., Garnavich was a postdoctoral fellow at Dominion Astrophysical Observatory from 1992 to 1995. He used the 72-inch Plaskett telescope to measure the age and distance of open star cluster NGC 6791. Garnavich also obtained spectra of bright supernova SN 1993J located in nearby galaxy M81.

Garnavich was also a fellow at the Center for Astrophysics | Harvard & Smithsonian from 1995 to 1999. In 1998, Garnavich led a team that used the Hubble Space Telescope to observe three distant high-redshift supernovae, the first published results of the High-Z Supernova Search Team. The supernova observations indicated that the universe was not slowing down in its expansion and would potentially expand forever. These images were also featured on the January 14, 1998 Astronomy Picture of the Day internet site.

Garnavich was a key member of the High-Z Supernova Search Team that discovered the acceleration of the expansion of the universe. That discovery was awarded the 2011 Nobel Prize in Physics, and the prize was given to High-Z team leader Brian Schmidt and team member Adam Reiss. Also receiving the prize was Saul Perlmutter of the Supernova Cosmology Project.

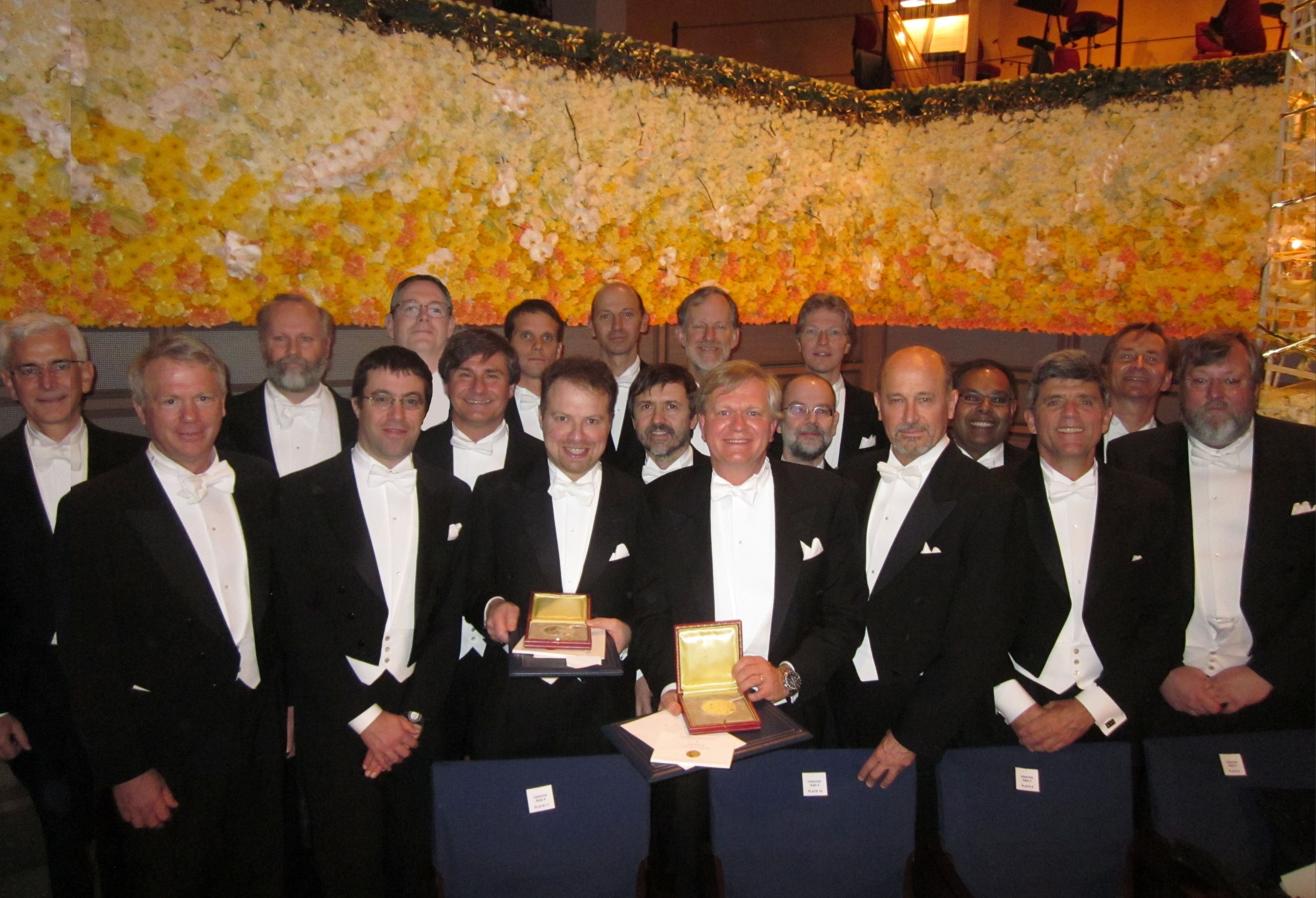
The High-Z Supernova Team, Nobel Prize ceremony, 2011. Peter Garnavich is second from the right.

Also while at the Center for Astrophysics, Garnavich began to collaborate with Kris Stanek to study the origin of enigmatic gamma ray bursts (GRB). These distant explosions, among the most powerful in the universe, were thought to be linked to supernovae, but confirmation of this relationship was needed. Garnavich and Stanek detected features attributed to a supernova in the spectrum of "nearby" (6-billion light years) gamma ray burst GRB 011121 which was observed in 2001. Their results linked gamma ray bursts with supernovae. As with this result, observations of GRB 030329 in 2003 led Garnavich to suggest that the progenitor star was likely a hypernova, an exploding star of mass 20-50 times that of the Sun. In 2005, after joining the faculty of the University of Notre Dame, Garnavich used the Spitzer Space Telescope to measure the heat (afterglow) in far-infrared of another gamma ray burst, GRB 050525a.

In 2000, Garnavich joined the University of Notre Dame as an assistant professor and was promoted to associate professor in 2003. In 2008, he earned the rank of full professor. Garnavich was appointed chair of the Department of Physics in 2017. In 2022, the department was officially named the Department of Physics and Astronomy. The current chair of the department is Morten Eskildsen.

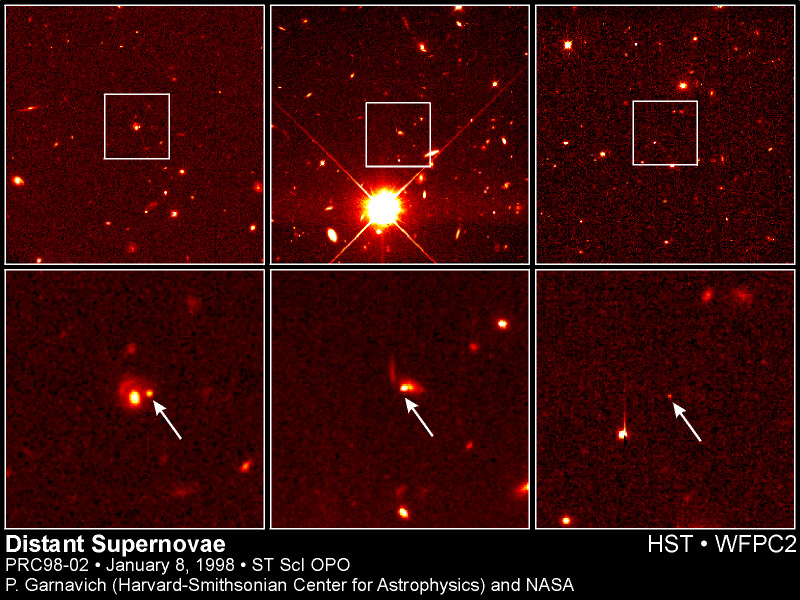
Observations of three high-redshift supernovae obtained using the Hubble Space Telescope.

In 2003, working with colleagues from Harvard, Garnavich published results of a study of pre-main sequence star KH 15D. As a binary star system, the team concluded that anomalous changes in brightness were likely caused by a disk of opaque matter occulting the star. The paper's main author is Joshua Winn of Princeton University.

Also at Notre Dame, Garnavich continued his supernova and cosmology research. As a member of the ESSENCE Supernova Survey collaboration, Garnavich obtained the spectra and distances of 102 Type Ia supernovae. Some of these data were used to estimate the value of the "dark energy equation of state parameter" (w), a measure of the density of dark energy in an expanding universe.

Using data from the SDSS-II Supernova Survey, Garnavich was able to link Type Ia supernova rates with galaxy characteristics. This work involved comparing the early behavior of supernova light curves with models of the progenitor stars. The study of supernova rise times led to Brian Hayden's Ph.D. dissertation.

Charlotte M. Wood of Iowa State University and Benjamin Rose of Baylor University earned their PhDs working under Garnavich at the University of Notre Dame in the field of supernova cosmology. Wood's dissertation concerned Type Ia supernovae in elliptical galaxies and the use of supernovae in measuring the Hubble constant. Benjamin Rose's dissertation addressed "systematic biases of Type Ia supernova distances used in observational cosmology".

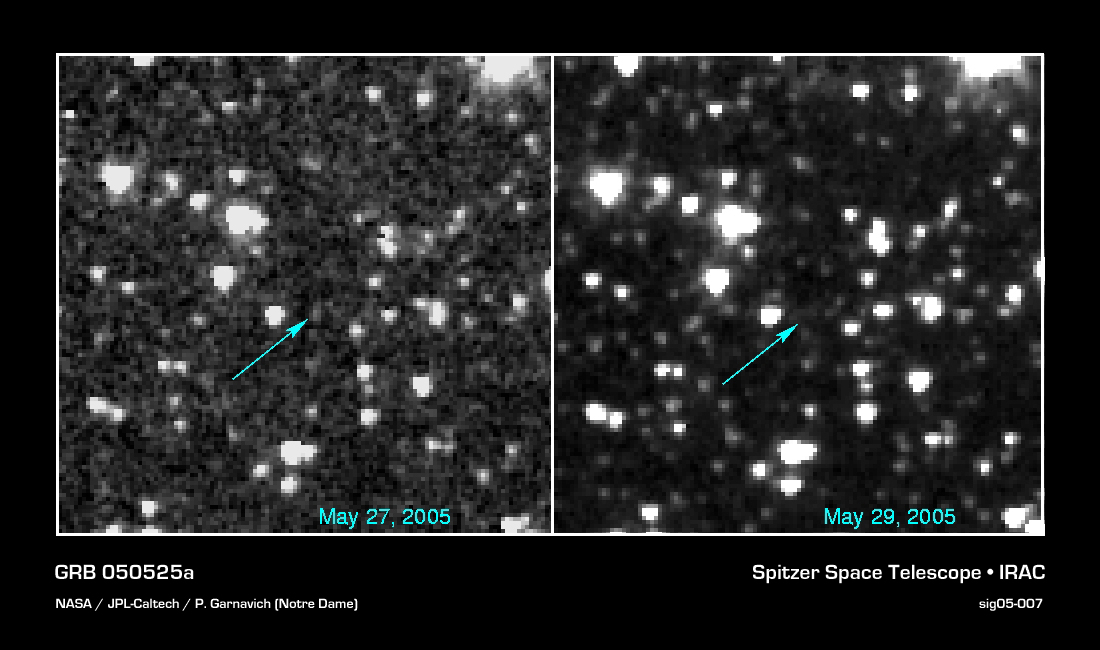
Afterglow of gamma ray burst GRB 050525a detected by the Spitzer Space Telescope.

Garnavich and other researchers utilized the famous planet hunting Kepler Space Telescope (KST) as an instrument to measure extragalactic supernovae. After its primary planet hunting mission ended, the KST concentrated its gaze on around 500 distant galaxies and collected data every 30 minutes. This setup enabled the first ever capture of a Type II supernova shock wave.

Using the Large Binocular Telescope, Garnavich and Colin Littlefield's observations of cataclysmic variable stars revealed the second only known "propeller star." The first known such star, AE Aquarii, consists of a white dwarf star orbiting a red giant companion. Normally in such systems, material drawn off of the red giant's atmosphere becomes deposited onto the white dwarf. With propeller stars, the material is flung into space by the rotation of the white dwarf's magnetic field and appears as a gaseous prominence. This second-known propeller star is named LAMOST J024048.51+195226.9 (J0240 for short). Material flung from J0240 is moving at approximately 1% of the speed of light.

Garnavich has been recognized for his instruction of student researchers. In 2012, Notre Dame law student Colin Littlefield published a paper in The Astronomical Journal detailing the discovery of WR 142b, a rare Wolf-Rayet star. Co-authors of the paper include Garnavich and Terrig Rettig of Notre Dame. In 2024, under Garnavich's tutelage, Notre Dame undergraduate McKenna Leichty discovered a potential planet within the cataclysmic variable star system V808 Aurigae. Leichty used the 0.8-meter Sarah L. Krizmanich Telescope located in an observatory on the top of Notre Dame's Jordan Hall of Science.

Garnavich also participated in public astronomy outreach events sponsored by the University of Notre Dame. In 2003, Garnavich operated Notre Dame's historic Napoleon III Telescope to provide views of the planet Mars during its historic close opposition. Garnavich provided a public lecture titled "Big Science: The Largest Telescope on Earth and in Space" at the Jordan Hall of Science on Oct 28, 2014. Telescope viewing on the roof of Jordan Hall was also scheduled for this event.

== Awards & recognition ==
In 1992, at the Dominion Astrophysical Observatory, Garnavich obtained a Plaskett Fellowship which is granted to recent outstanding doctoral graduates in astrophysics.

Garnavich is a member of the American Physical Society (APS).

For his work with the High-Z Supernova Search Team, Garnavich was awarded the Gruber Prize in Cosmology (2007) and the Breakthrough Prize in Fundamental Physics (2015).

Garnavich was cited in a widely circulated newspaper article concerning a conference named "Galileo Was Wrong, The Church Was Right" held adjacent to the University of Notre Dame in 2011. The conference organizers were a "small group of conservative Roman Catholics" who cited some Bible verses and the Church's original teachings claiming that they support the geocentric or earth-centered universe model. Garnavich was quoted as an astrophysicist at "America's flagship Catholic university" who didn't agree with the conference. According to Garnavich, geocentrism is "an idea whose time has come and gone" and "there are some people who want to move the world back to the 1950s when it seemed like a better time... these are people who want to move the world back to the 1250s... I don't really understand it at all."

The American Association for the Advancement of Science (AAAS) elected Garnavich as a physics fellow in 2012.

Garnavich has helped the Space Telescope Science Institute to implement the "Working Group for Anonymizing Proposal Reviews" to increase the number of women and younger researchers who have been granted time to use the Hubble Space Telescope. For this work, Garnavich was awarded a NASA Silver Achievement Award in 2020.

In 2024, Garnavich was named a fellow of the American Astronomical Society. Along with research in supernovae, gamma ray bursts, and cataclysmic variable stars, he was also recognized for his "leadership in observational collaborations" and "tireless devotion to students and the astronomical community."

Discovered in 1997, asteroid 1997 SJ34 was named 31139 Garnavich in honor of Peter Garnavich. The name was suggested by Czech amateur astronomer K. Hornoch. 31139 Garnavich is a 1.9 km wide main-belt asteroid.

== See also ==
Napoleon III Telescope (University of Notre Dame)

Sarah L. Krizmanich Telescope

List of exoplanets discovered in 2024

== Sites of interest ==
Notre Dame Department of Physics and Astronomy

Notre Dame Department of Physics and Astronomy: Peter Garnavich
