= SDSS J230641.47+244055.8 =

Binary pulsar system in the constellation Pegasus

Observation data Epoch J2000 Equinox ICRS
- Constellation: Pegasus
- Right ascension: 23^{h} 06^{m} 41.4729^{s}
- Declination: +24° 40′ 55.933″

Characteristics
- Apparent magnitude (G): 19.875±0.017
- Variable type: White dwarf pulsar + orbital modulation

White dwarf
- Evolutionary stage: White dwarf

Red dwarf
- Evolutionary stage: Main sequence
- Spectral type: M4.0±0.5
- Variable type: W UMa

Astrometry
| Radial velocity (R_{v}) | 33±9 km/s |
| Proper motion (μ) | RA: −11.015 mas/yr Dec.: −13.626 mas/yr |
| Parallax (π) | 0.8864±0.4656 mas |
| Distance | approx. 4,000 ly (approx. 1,100 pc) |

Orbit
| Period (P) | 0.145581 d (3.4939558 h) |
| Eccentricity (e) | 0 |
| Inclination (i) | ≃ 45 - 50° |

Details

White dwarf
| Temperature | 11500 K |
| Rotation | 92.28±3 s |

Red dwarf
| Mass | 0.19 - 0.28 M_{☉} |
| Temperature | 3300±100 K |

Other designations
- SDSS J2306, ZTF J230641.45+244055.7, WISE J230641.43+244055.6, Gaia DR3 2842721961392797312

Database references
| SIMBAD | data |

SDSS J230641.47+244055.8 (abbreviated as SDSS J2306) is a binary star system composed of a pulsar-like white dwarf and a red dwarf, located in the constellation Pegasus at a distance of approximately 4,000 light-years. This is the third such system discovered, following AR Scorpii and eRASSU J191213.9-441044.

== Discovery ==
In 2020, a team of astronomers led by Chen was analyzing data from the Zwicky Transient Facility (ZTF) photometric survey. The object SDSS J2306 was mistakenly classified as an W Ursae Majoris-type contact binary with a presumed orbital period of 6.98794 hours. In 2023, a group of scientists headed by Inayath studied the object's spectrum, obtained as part of the Sloan Digital Sky Survey (SDSS). They ruled out eclipses, instead describing light variations due to the heated side of the red dwarf as it orbits and rotates, as well as more rapid intrinsic variations. The spectrum is dominated by molecular bands from the cool M-type red dwarf, but with peculiar bright hydrogen emission lines present. There is also pulsed emission across the whole electromagnetic spectrum.

In the summer of 2025, an international research team, during a targeted search for analogs of the AR Scorpii system, re-examined the object's archival spectral data and discovered features characteristic of white dwarf pulsars. Subsequent high-precision photometric observations confirmed the system's true orbital period of 3.49 hours and recorded stable pulsations with a period of 92 seconds, attributed to the white dwarfs rotation. As a result, the object was officially registered as the third known white dwarf pulsar.

== Characteristics ==
The system consists of two stars orbiting a common center of mass with an orbital period of 3.49 hours. The primary star is a rapidly rotating white dwarf. Due to its strong magnetic field and high rotation speed with a period of 92.28 seconds, the star generates beamed non-thermal radiation. This rotation period is the second fastest among known pulsars of this type, surpassed only by eRASSU J191213.9-441044. The companion star is a low-mass red dwarf of spectral type M4.0±0.5. Its mass is estimated to be in the range of 0.19 - 0.28 M_{☉}, and its effective temperature is 3300 K. The star almost completely fills its Roche lobe, and its atmosphere is continuously subjected to intense irradiation from the white dwarf.

=== Variability ===
The system's optical light curve, plotted against its orbital period, shows a significant brightness scatter of up to 10%. The most powerful fluctuations and chaotic flares occur at those moments when the tidally locked, irradiated side of the red dwarf faces Earth. The system's integrated luminosity noticeably exceeds the combined thermal radiation of both stars, which is due to the transformation of the white dwarf's rotational kinetic energy into radiation.

The optical spectra of the system simultaneously exhibit signs of both components. In the red and infrared regions, broad molecular absorption bands of titanium oxide (TiO) and absorption lines of sodium (Na I), characteristic of M-dwarf atmospheres, dominate. Against the background of the continuum spectrum, narrow emission lines of the Balmer series of hydrogen (Hα) and neutral helium (He I) are observed, generated by photoionization of the upper layers of the companion's atmosphere. The Hα line also has a broad, low-amplitude component, indicating energetic flare processes.
