= WX Pyxidis =

Star in the constellation Pyxis

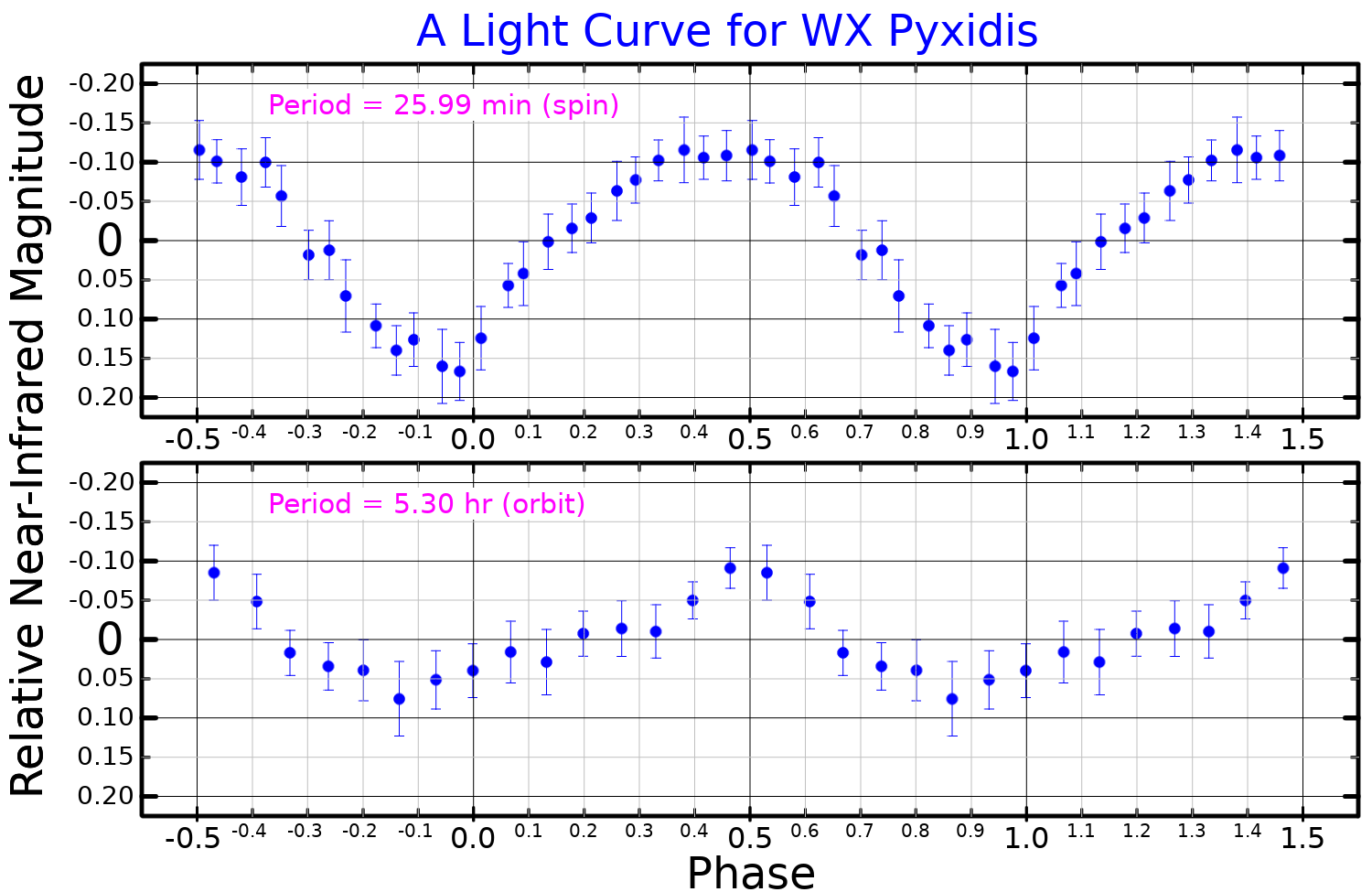
- Near-infrared (J band) light curves for WX Pyxidis, showing variation over the white dwarf rotation period (top) and orbital period (bottom). Adapted from Joshi et al. (2011)

Observation data Epoch J2000 Equinox J2000
- Constellation: Pyxis
- Right ascension: 08^{h} 33^{m} 05.7636^{s}
- Declination: −22° 48′ 31.981″
- Apparent magnitude (V): 16.2 - 17.74

Characteristics
- Spectral type: white dwarf + M2
- Variable type: Intermediate polar

Astrometry
Proper motion (μ)	RA: −4.627 mas/yr Dec.: 1.378 mas/yr
Parallax (π)	0.5991±0.0851 mas
Distance	1530 pc

Details

White dwarf
Mass	1.4 M_{☉}

Other designations
- 1E 0830.9-2238

Database references
SIMBAD	data

WX Pyxidis is a cataclysmic variable star system in the constellation Pyxis. Its X-ray emissions were discovered in 1984, after which a visual correlate was searched for. It is classed as an intermediate polar system, composed of a white dwarf and red dwarf with a calculated spectral type of M2V in close orbit around each other and the spin of the degenerate star is such that it does not present the same face to the other star. The degenerate star spins on its axis every 25 minutes. The stars are estimated to take 5.3 hours to orbit each other and the system is 1530 parsecs distant.
