= DQ Herculis =

Nova in the constellation Hercules

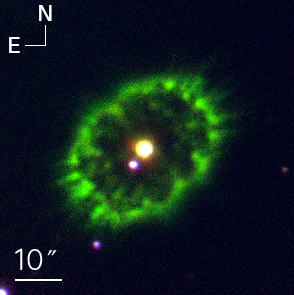
- RGB composite color image of the shell surrounding the nova DQ Her, made from three narrow band images: Blue = 4800Å, green = Hα at 6563 Å and red = [NII] at 6583 Å. From Santamaria et al. 2020

Observation data Epoch J2000 Equinox ICRS
- Constellation: Hercules
- Right ascension: 18^{h} 07^{m} 30.25108^{s}
- Declination: +45° 51′ 32.5646″
- Apparent magnitude (V): 1.5 - 15.16

Characteristics
- Spectral type: DBe + M2V
- Variable type: DQ Her

Astrometry
| Proper motion (μ) | RA: −0.948 mas/yr Dec.: +12.423 mas/yr |
| Parallax (π) | 1.9975±0.0237 mas |
| Distance | 1,630 ± 20 ly (501 ± 6 pc) |
| Absolute magnitude (M_{V}) | −6.94 |

Orbit
| Period (P) | 0.1936208977 ± 0.0000000017 d |
| Semi-major axis (a) | 0.003 AU |
| Inclination (i) | 86.5±1.6° |

Details

A
| Mass | 0.6 M_{☉} |
| Radius | 0.0121 R_{☉} |

B
| Mass | 0.4 M_{☉} |

Other designations
- Nova Her 1934, DQ Her, 2MASS J18073024+4551325, CDS 959, PLX 4164, AN 452.1934, GCRV 10587, CSI+45-18061, SBC7 665, AAVSO 1804+45

Database references
| SIMBAD | data |

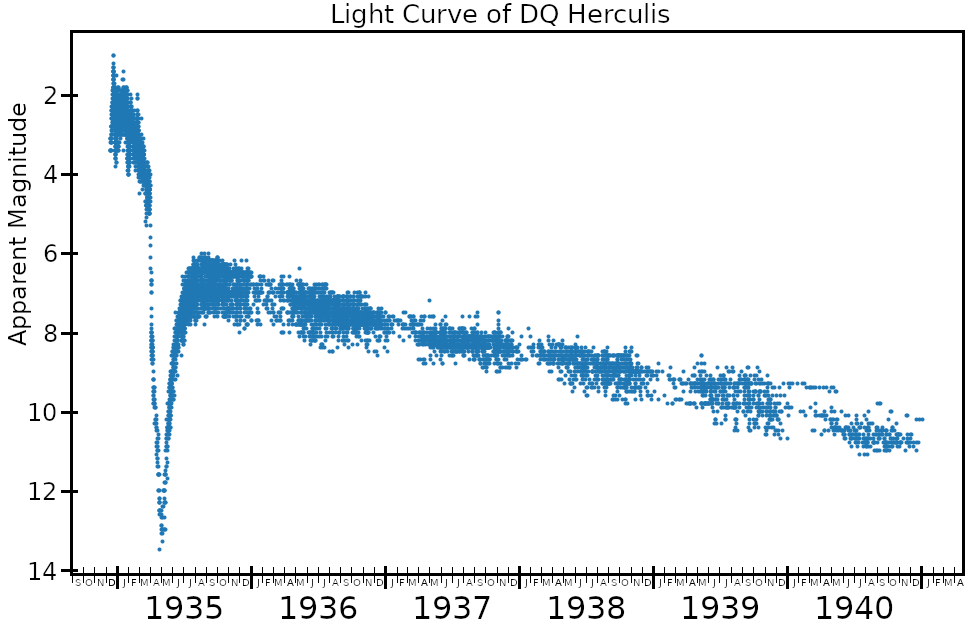
The light curve of DQ Herculis, from AAVSO data. The pronounced "dust dip" roughly four months after peak brightness was caused by dust forming as the ejected shell expanded and cooled.

DQ Herculis, or Nova Herculis 1934, was a slow, bright nova occurring in the northern constellation of Hercules in December 1934. This cataclysmic variable star was discovered on 13 December 1934 by J. P. M. Prentice from Stowmarket, Suffolk. It reached peak brightness on 22 December 1934 with an apparent magnitude of 1.5. The nova remained visible to the naked eye for several months.

This is a binary star system consisting of a white dwarf primary with an estimated 60% of the mass of the Sun and a red dwarf secondary with 40% of the Sun's mass. They orbit each other tightly with a period of 4.65 hours. The system shows orbital period variation, possibly due to the presence of a third body. The orbital plane of the pair is inclined by an angle of 86.5° to the line of sight from the Earth, causing the white dwarf to undergo a deep eclipse every orbit.

DQ Herculis is the prototype for a category of cataclysmic variable stars called intermediate polars. The red dwarf has filled its Roche lobe and matter is being drawn off at the rate of 2.7 × 10^{−9} M_{☉} yr^{−1}, forming an accretion disk orbiting the primary. This disk has inferred temperatures ranging from 5,000 to 13,500 K. A bright spot in the inner disk appears to pulsate with a 71-second period. In this class of variables, the white dwarf is magnetized, directing infalling matter onto the magnetic poles.

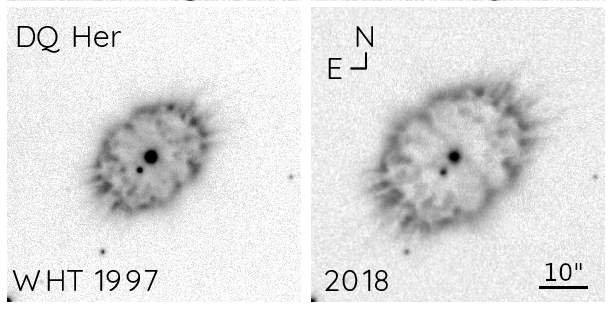
Two images of the shell surrounding DQ Hercules taken 21 years apart, showing the nebula's expansion. Both were taken with Hα filters, left at the William Herschel Telescope, and right with the Nordic Optical Telescope.

The shell of ejected material from the nova outburst is visible as an emission nebula, similar in appearance to a planetary nebula. This roughly elliptical nebula had a size of 32.0 × 24.2 arc seconds as of 2018, and it is expanding at a rate of about 0.16 arc seconds per year.

== In popular culture ==
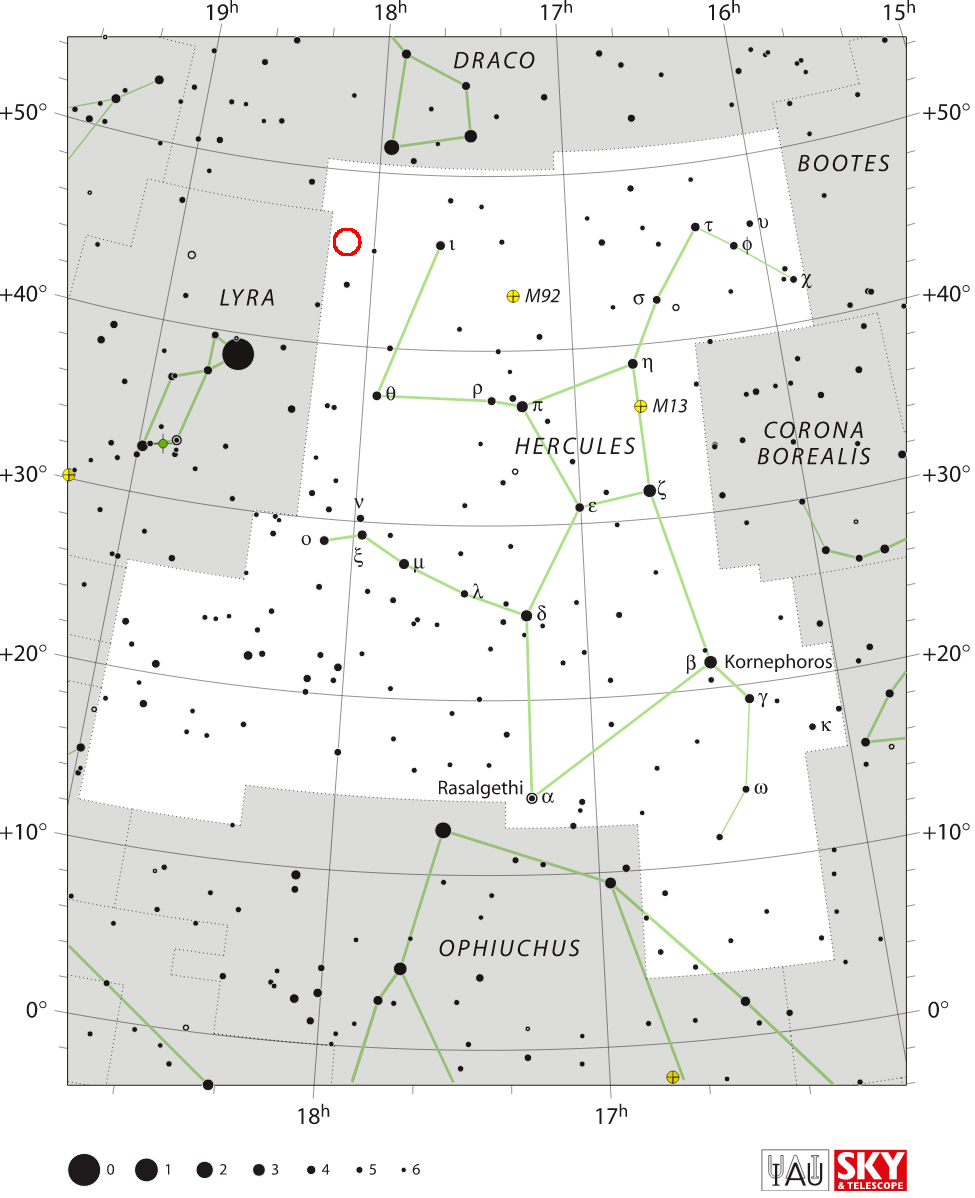
The location of nova DQ Herculis (circled in red)

The nova was one of the brightest objects observable in the night sky. In addition to scientific articles, and received significant coverage in popular news publications. Brad Ricca, an English professor at Case Western Reserve University, has suggested that Nova Herculis may have influenced the development of the origin story of the comic book superhero Superman.
