= Napoleon III Telescope (University of Notre Dame) =

Historic 6-inch refracting telescope

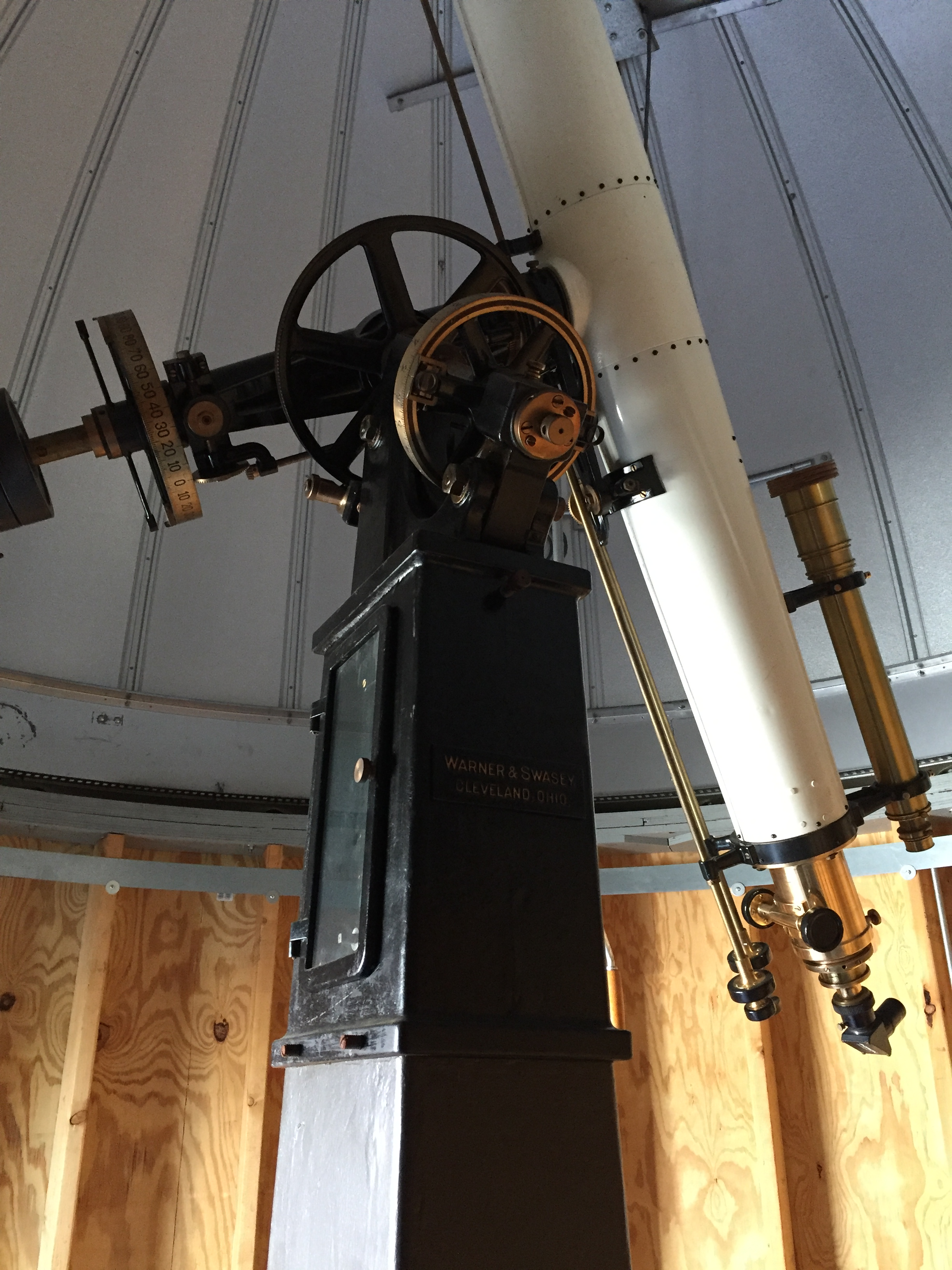
- Napoleon III Telescope, Warner & Swasey equatorial mount
- Location: Nieuwland Hall, University of Notre Dame, du Lac, Notre Dame, IN
- Coordinates: 41°42′06″N 86°14′11″W
- Organization: Secretan of Paris, Léon Foucault
- Altitude: 225 m
- Wavelength: Visible
- Built: 1867
- Diameter: 15.24 cm (6-in)
- Focal length: f/15 (7-ft, 6-in)
- Mounting: Equatorial (Warner & Swasey)
- Website: physics.nd.edu

The Napoleon III Telescope is an historic 6-inch refracting telescope owned by the University of Notre Dame. The telescope was given to the university in 1867 by French Emperor Napoleon III and is housed in an observatory on the top of the Nieuwland Hall of Science. The objective lens of the telescope was designed by the French physicist Léon Foucault who is best known for a pendulum experiment that demonstrated earth's rotation.

== Acquisition ==
In the spring of 1866, Father J. C. Carrier of the University of Notre Dame was sent to France for a seven month visit. One of his goals was to obtain gifts and materials for the university. Fr. Carrier had also founded the Notre Dame College of Science in 1865.

Fr. Carrier had an audience with Emperor Napoleon III. The emperor had been a friend of Notre Dame's founder Father Edward Sorin and also had an interest in science. Fr. Carrier returned to the university with books, church ornaments, sacred vessels, and scientific instruments including a 6-inch refracting telescope. The gift of the telescope was announced in various newspapers. The telescope was worth 25,000 francs (about $553,000 in 2024) and was one of a set of instruments built exclusively for the French government.

The telescope was built at the Secretan Company of Paris, and its construction was supervised by the celebrated French physicist Léon Foucault. Foucault is known for the pendulum experiment that demonstrated earth's rotation and for the knife-edge test of telescope optics. The objective lens was reported to be 6 inches with a focal length of 9 feet, 9 inches. (Bro. Peter listed the focal length at 7-feet, 6-inches which better matches to photographs of the telescope). Also included were seven eyepieces that yielded magnifications ranging from 75X to 310X. The telescope was mounted on an alt-azimuth white walnut frame where altitude was controlled by gears and azimuth by chains. Inscribed in French on the telescope tube was the following statement: "Presented by his Imperial Majesty Napoleon III, to the Catholic University of Notre Dame du Lac, Indiana, United States."

== Garden observatory ==
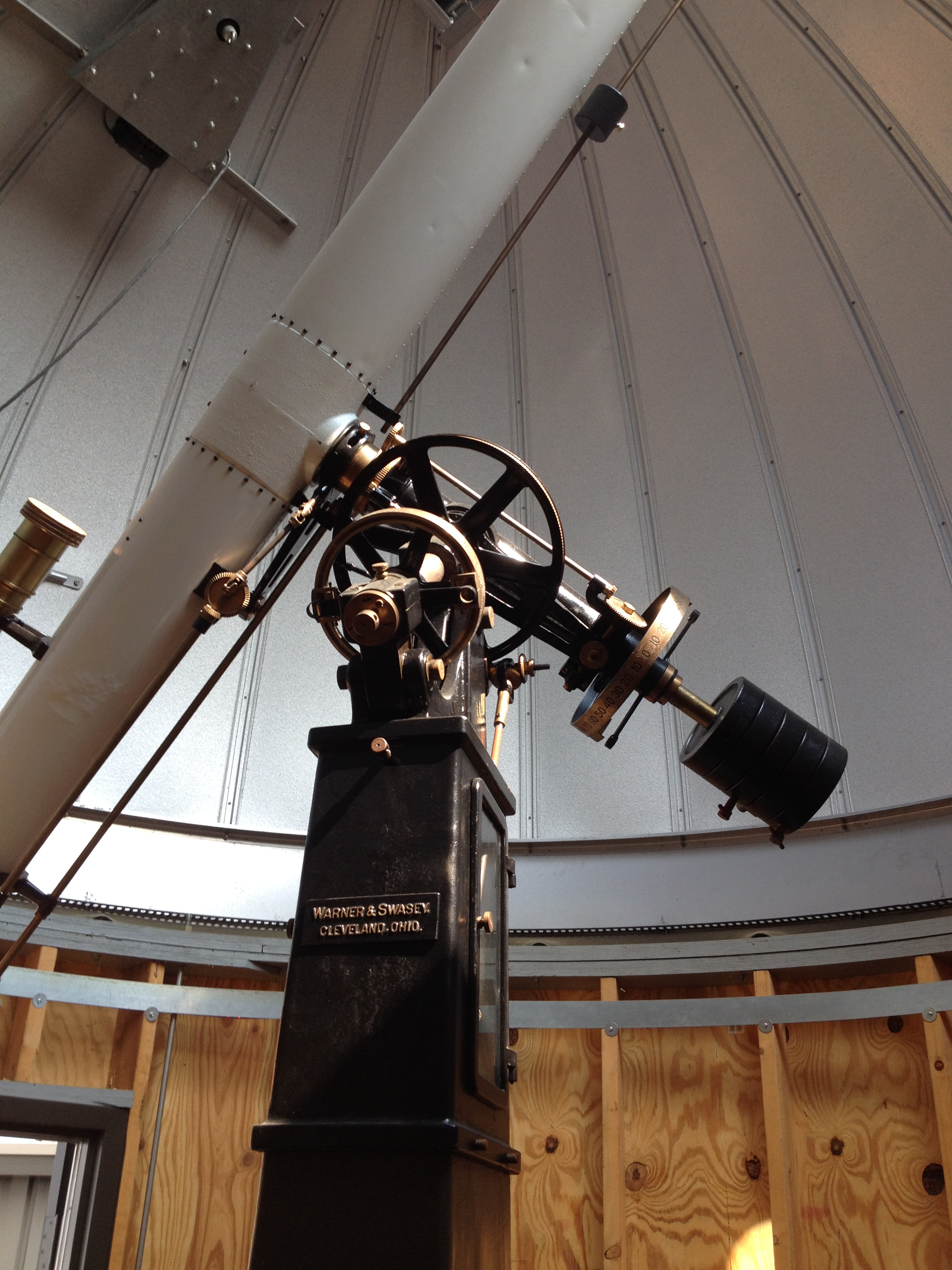
Napoleon III Telescope with Warner & Swasey equatorial mount

The telescope was stored in a classroom under the care of Prof. Timothy E. Howard until a permanent observatory was completed in 1870. Prof. Howard would later become a state senator and Indiana Supreme Court Justice, and a park in South Bend, Indiana is named in his honor. The new observatory was a "small but very convenient building" located in the front garden in front of the College Building. The telescope's portable stand was placed on a masonry column that passed from the ground up through the floor of the observatory. The structure featured a revolving roof of 18-feet diameter. The observatory had been designed by Rev. Peter John Fitzpatrick, known as Bro. Peter, who was the university's postmaster, gardens keeper, and astronomy teacher.

At this time the university's president, Fr. William Corby, was given a new telescope by the university's senior class. Fr. Corby was a Civil War veteran and is known for his blessing of the troops before the Battle of Gettysburg. The instrument was a 3-inch aperture achromatic refractor with a focal length of 3 1/2-feet (f/14). The telescope utilized a rack and pinion focuser and had eyepieces to "suit all purposes." The instrument was made by Solomons of Dublin, Ireland and cost $80. This telescope is not mentioned in any later sources.

In April 1879, a great fire destroyed the main University building. The Napoleon III Telescope was not damaged, but its small observatory was filled with items rescued from the fire. The telescope remained unused until September 1879 when the building was cleaned out and the telescope returned to working condition. On the evening of September 21, 1879, members of the astronomy class used the telescope to observe Jupiter and Saturn.

== Badin Observatory ==
Plans for a new observatory were created, and the Napoleon III Telescope was put in storage in 1880. It wasn't until 1886 when Prof. Arthur J. Stace reinstated plans and the intention to build the new observatory. Prof. Stace taught astronomy as well as civil engineering and surveying, he was the university's first civil engineering professor and was also elected surveyor for St. Joseph County, Indiana. The initial construction of the new observatory did not take place until 1891 when ground was broken "south of Science Hall" and "Badin Observatory" was approaching completion in the late winter of 1892. Prof. Howard described the new observatory in his book A History of Saint Joseph County, Indiana, Volume 2. The observatory featured a revolving dome, a transit room with transit telescope, and a north wing featuring reference works and smaller instruments.

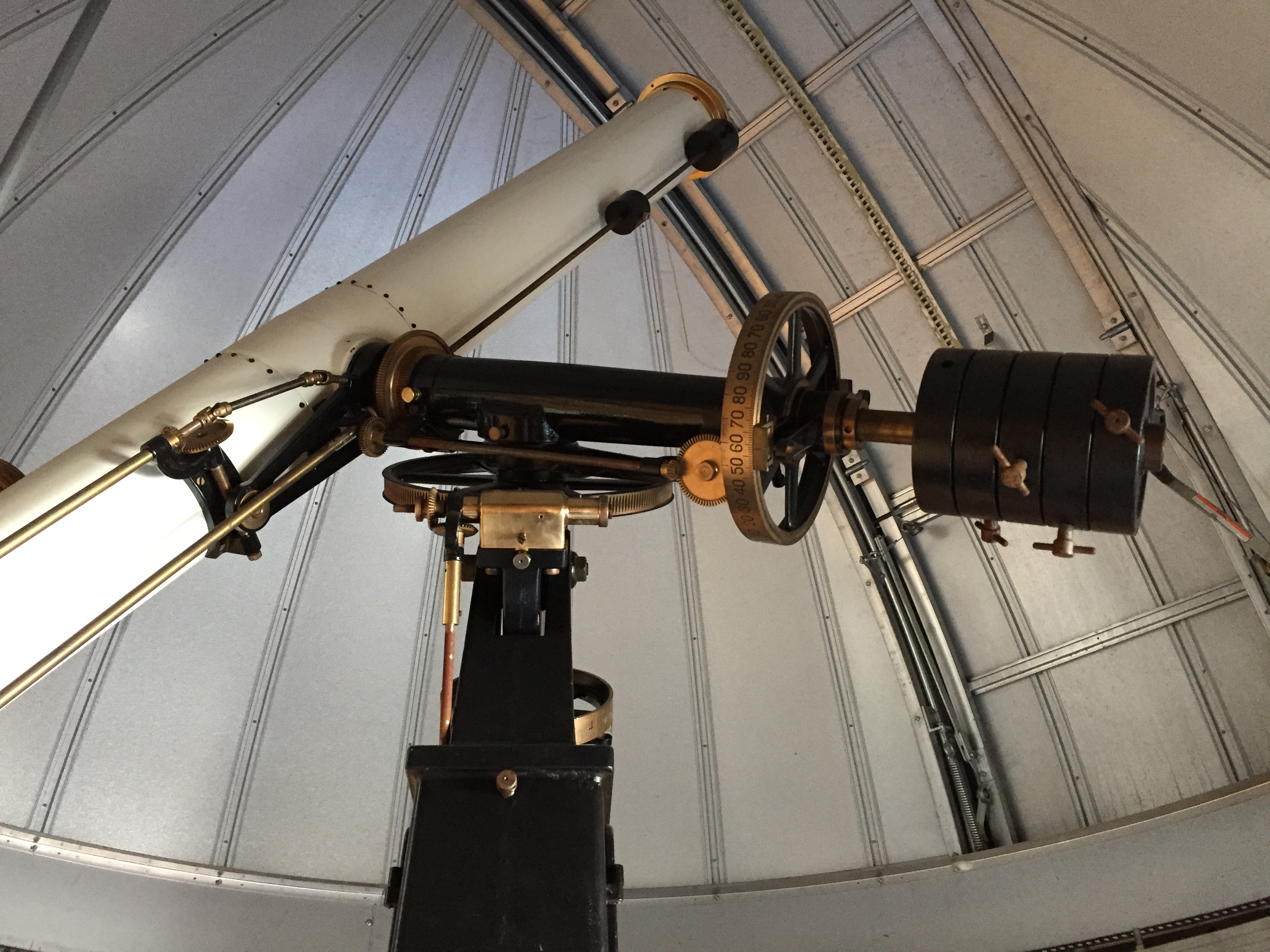
Details of Warner & Swasey equatorial mount

To augment the new observatory, the Napoleon III Telescope was placed on a new mount obtained from the Warner & Swasey Co. of Cleveland, Ohio. The original Foucault lens was also refigured by J.M. Brashear of Pittsburgh, Pennsylvania. Warner & Swasey Company is best known for completing mounts for the Lick Observatory and Yerkes Observatory refracting telescopes which at the time where the largest telescopes in the world. An example of a 6-inch Warner & Swasey telescope mount is depicted in a Few Astronomical Instruments from the Works of Warner & Swasey, Plate II. In 1894 a "modern telescopic chair" was obtained for the observatory. The chair and observatory was meant for student use, and the new chair had been used to observe Saturn.

The observatory was in use until the 1930s. In 1932, the observatory was described as being equipped with a "filiar micronometer and other accessories for observation work".

In 1919, the university hired Fr. Emil De Wulf who founded a separate Department of Astronomy at Notre Dame. A native of South Bend, Fr. De Wulf studied astronomy at the Catholic University of Washington, D.C. Fr. De Wulf stated the intention to build a new observatory and obtain a larger telescope for the Notre Dame campus. He also said that the current observatory was likely to be moved to a different location on the campus in the interim. After Fr. De Wulf's death in 1930, the observatory was moved to a new site east of the university tennis courts due to the construction of the Hurley Hall of Business Administration.

The Badin Observatory would eventually be abandoned. Fr. James E. Kline, who had succeeded Fr. De Wulf as astronomy professor, later petitioned the university to keep the observatory, but the structure was dismantled and the telescope put in storage some time before 1933. According to a newspaper item, the rotating roof of the Notre Dame Observatory was put to use as a "hot dog stand" after the building was taken down.

Although the university continued to offer introductory astronomy classes, the University's Department of Astronomy was closed in 1940. In 2022, the University's physics department was officially renamed the "Department of Physics and Astronomy".

== Nieuwland Hall of Science ==
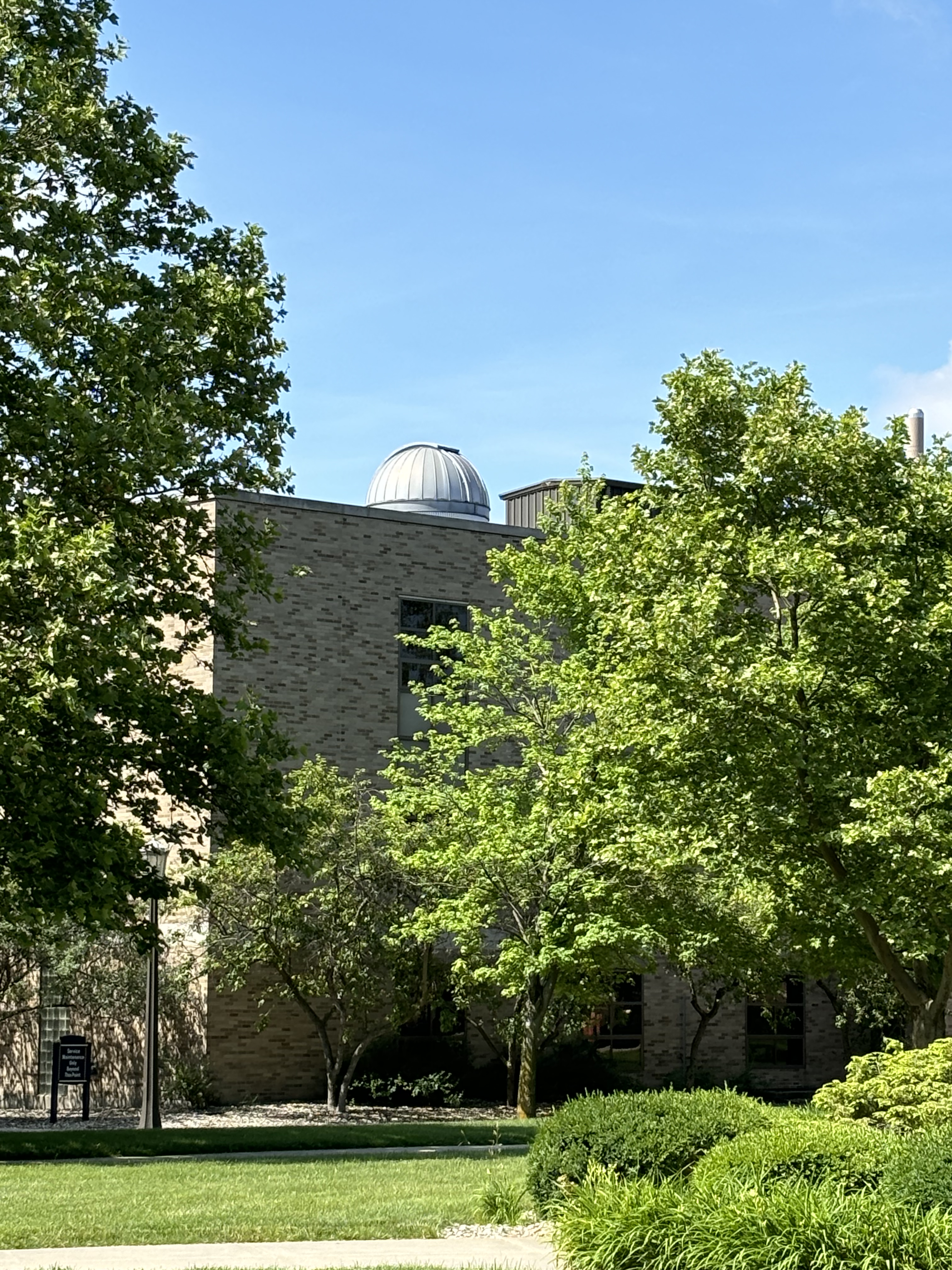
Napoleon III Telescope observatory dome, Nieuwland Hall of Science

The Napoleon III Telescope remained in storage until 1955. A student and later priest and Notre Dame faculty member, Fr. James Stilts, retrieved the telescope from storage in order to observe the 1955 opposition of Mars. Stilts and other students carried the telescope and mount to the roof of the recently built Nieuwland Hall of Science. After the assembly and Mars observation, the telescope and mount were left on the roof under a tarp and eventually became damaged due to the region's harsh weather.

Fr. Stilts became a Notre Dame faculty member in 1959. He petitioned funds from University President Fr. Theodore Hesburgh to repair the telescope and mount. Along with repairs, a protective shed for the telescope on the roof of Nieuwland Hall was to be built. Telescope repair was performed by Fred O'Callaghan of Franklin Park, Illinois who was associated with the Adler Planetarium in Chicago. Work on the telescope and observatory "shed" was completed in 1960. The structure featured a roll-off roof allowing the telescope access to the sky. According to Timothy Reilly, the telescope "stands inside its rather unattractive shelter, virtually unnoticed by a majority of the Notre Dame community. Its long history and its previous connections with royalty are known to only a few."

In the years since the 1960 installation, the telescope has been "cleaned and adjusted" several times according to Notre Dame librarian emeritus Robert J. Havlik. The telescope has also been removed and put on display in the Hesburgh Library on two occasions, one for the return of Comet Halley in 1986, and the other following a telescope refurbishing in 1993.

In 1993, the university began to host its Biennial History of Astronomy Workshop. At the 1995 workshop, a talk titled "The University of Notre Dame, Napoleon III Telescope" was given by Havlik and Notre Dame astronomer Terrence Rettig. Rettig has been considered the "founder of astronomy at Notre Dame" and engineered the university's partnership with the Large Binocular Telescope at Mt. Graham, Arizona. The workshop participants have also been treated to views of the night sky through the historic telescope.

Public telescope viewing nights were hosted in 2003 and 2004 at Nieuwland Hall to provide observations of the planet Mars during its historic close approach to earth. The Napoleon III Telescope was operated by Notre Dame astronomer Peter Garnavich. Prof. Garnavich is a member of the High Z Supernova Search Team that was instrumental in the 1998 discovery of dark energy, the accelerating expansion of the universe.

In 2011, the roll-off observatory shed on Nieuwland Hall was replaced by a modern dome observatory structure. According to Prof. Garnavich, the telescope and mount were refurbished and cleaned by the campus "physics shop". A public Astronomy Night was hosted on Oct 3 of that year to showcase the restored Napoleon III refractor.

== See also ==
- List of astronomical observatories
- Sarah L. Krizmanich Telescope
