= AE Aquarii =

Star in the constellation Aquarius

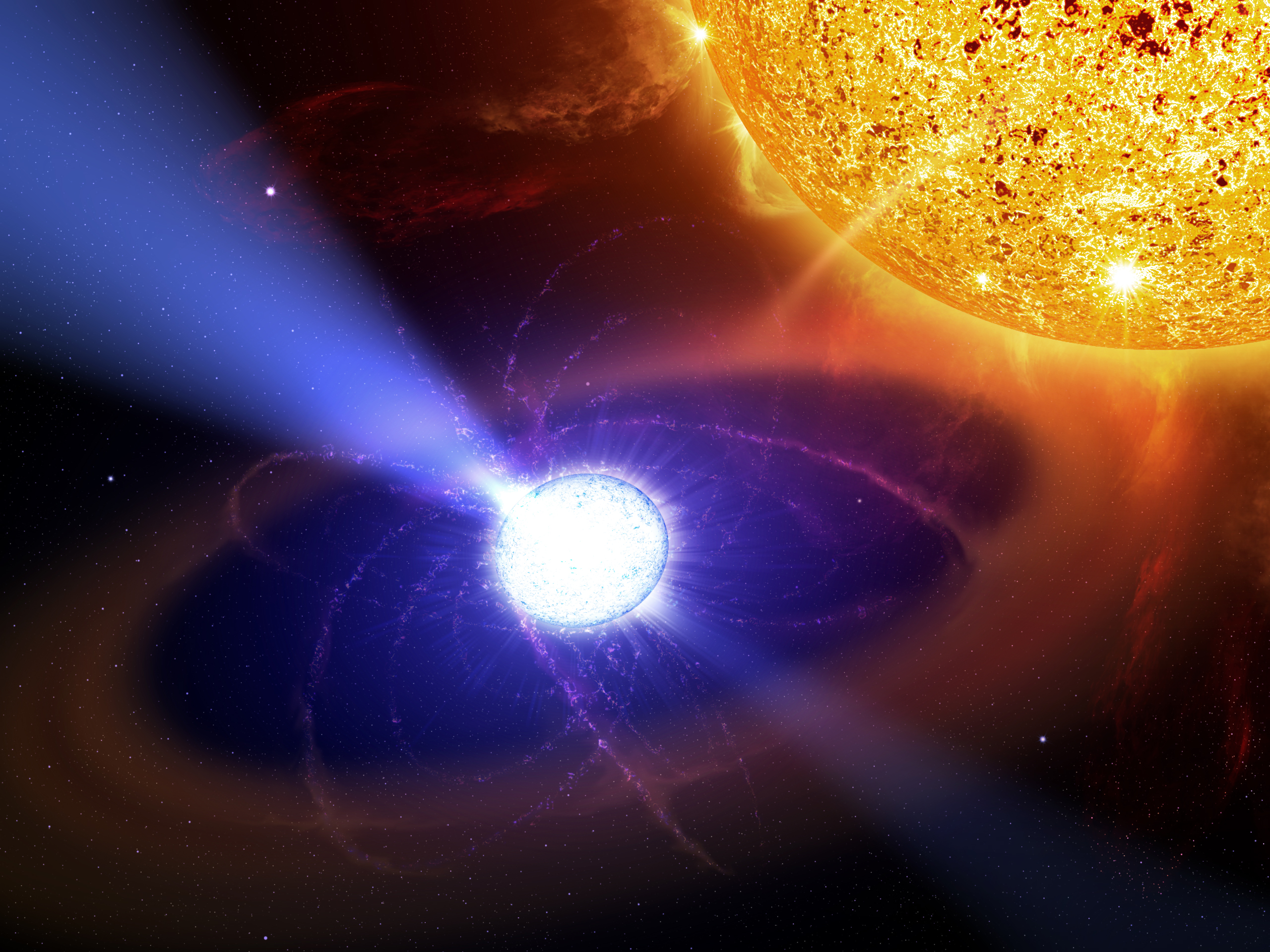
- Artistic illustration of the AE Aquarii system

Observation data Epoch J2000.0 Equinox ICRS
- Constellation: Aquarius
- Right ascension: 20^{h} 40^{m} 09.16206^{s}
- Declination: −00° 52′ 15.0618″
- Apparent magnitude (V): 11.6

Characteristics
- Spectral type: White dwarf + K4–5 V
- B−V color index: −1.2
- Variable type: DQ Her

Astrometry
Radial velocity (R_{v})	−53 km/s
Proper motion (μ)	RA: +73.95 mas/yr Dec.: +12.40 mas/yr
Parallax (π)	11.61±2.72 mas
Distance	approx. 280 ly (approx. 90 pc)
Absolute magnitude (M_{V})	~6.6

Orbit
Period (P)	9.88 hours
Semi-major axis (a)	2.34 ± 0.02 R_{☉}
Inclination (i)	70 ± 3°

Details

A
Mass	0.63 ± 0.05 M_{☉}
Radius	0.01 R_{☉}
Rotation	33.08 sec

B
Mass	0.37 ± 0.04 M_{☉}
Radius	0.79 R_{☉}

Other designations
- 2E 2037.5-0102, GCRV 71273, 1RXS J204009.4-005216, AN 342.1931, 2E 4404, GSC 05177-00636, SBC7 826, 1AXG J204011-0052, RJHA 119, CSI-01-20376, CDS 1178, HIP 101991, 1E 2037.5-0102, 1ES 2037-01.0, 2MASS J20400915-0052151, AAVSO 2035-01.

Database references
SIMBAD	data

AE Aquarii is a cataclysmic variable binary star of the DQ Herculis type. Based upon parallax measurements, the system is located at a distance of about 280 light-years (86 parsecs) from the Earth. Because of its unique properties, this system has been subject to a number of scientific studies. The white dwarf in the AE Aquarii system is the first star of its type known to give off pulsar-like pulsations that are powered by its rotation and particle acceleration.

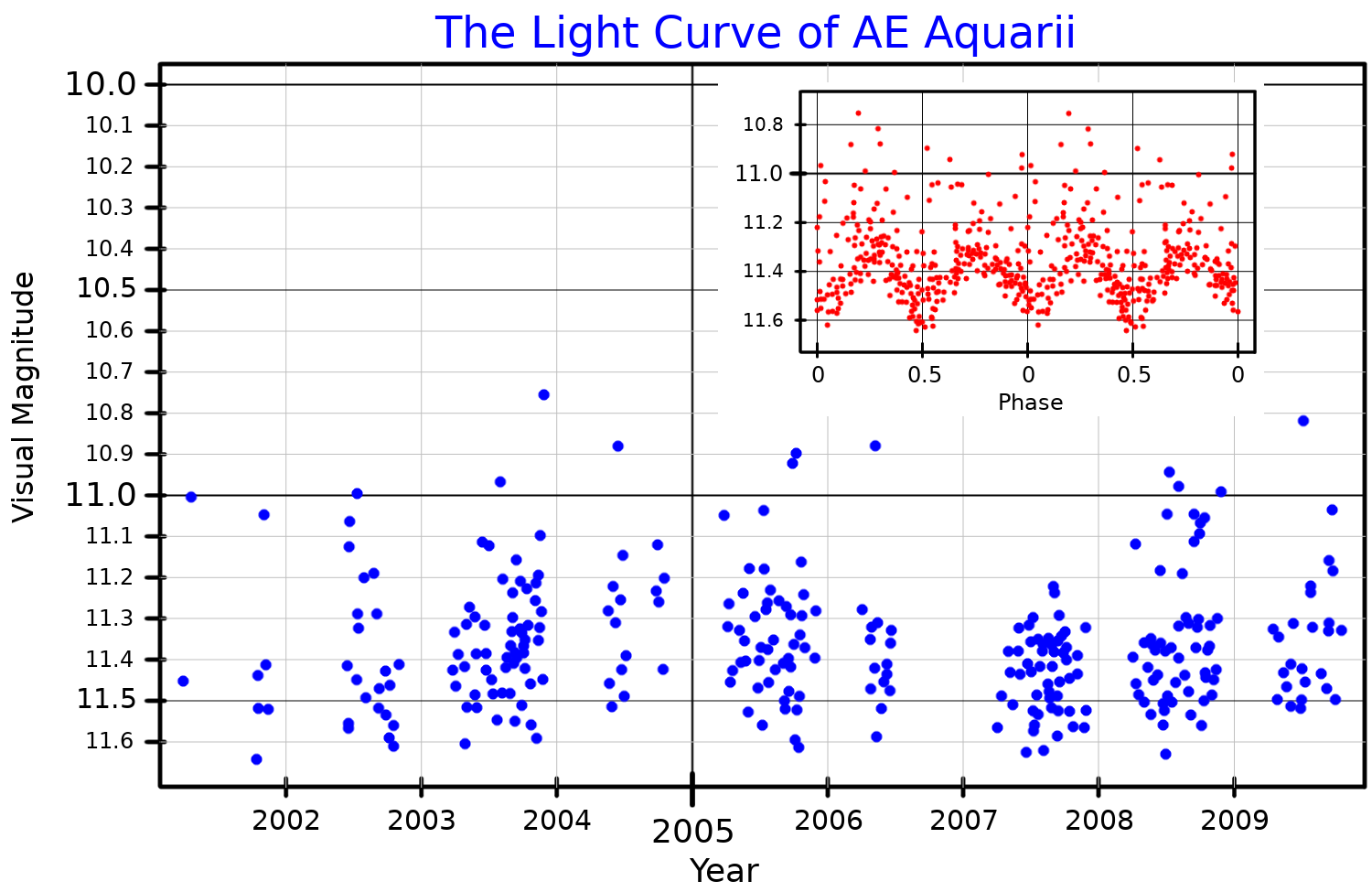
A visual band light curve for AE Aquarii. The main plot shows the long term variability, and the inset plot shows the short term variability over one orbital period. Adapted from Šimon (2020).

Arno Arthur Wachmann discovered that the star was variable after examining four photographic plates taken from 1923 through 1930. He classified the star as a mira variable based on that sparse data set. Wachmann published the discovery in 1931, naming the star 342.1931 Aquarii. In 1938, Ernst Zinner classified the star, which by then had received the variable star designation AE Aquarii, as a cataclysmic variable, based upon a much larger data set.

The AE Aquarii system consists of an ordinary star in a close orbit around a magnetic white dwarf; the pair orbit each other with a period of 9.88 hours. The white dwarf primary has 63% of the Sun's mass but a radius of only about 1% of the Sun. As of 2009, it has the shortest known spin period of any white dwarf, completing a full revolution every 33.08 seconds. This spin is decreasing at a rate of 1.78 ns per year, which is unusually high. The secondary star has a stellar classification of K4-5 V, making it a main sequence star that is generating energy at its core through the thermonuclear fusion of hydrogen. It has about 37% of the Sun's mass but 79% of the Sun's radius.

This system displays flare activity that has been observed across multiple bands of the electromagnetic spectrum, including X-rays. Mass is being lost from the secondary star, most of which is being flung out of the system by the rapidly spinning magnetic primary. The X-ray luminosity is likely being caused by the accretion of mass onto the white dwarf, which is occurring at an estimated rate of about 7.3 × 10^{10} kg per second.

== See also ==
- Pulsar
- X-ray pulsar
- AR Scorpii − another white dwarf pulsar
