= AR Scorpii =

Binary star system in the constellation Scorpius

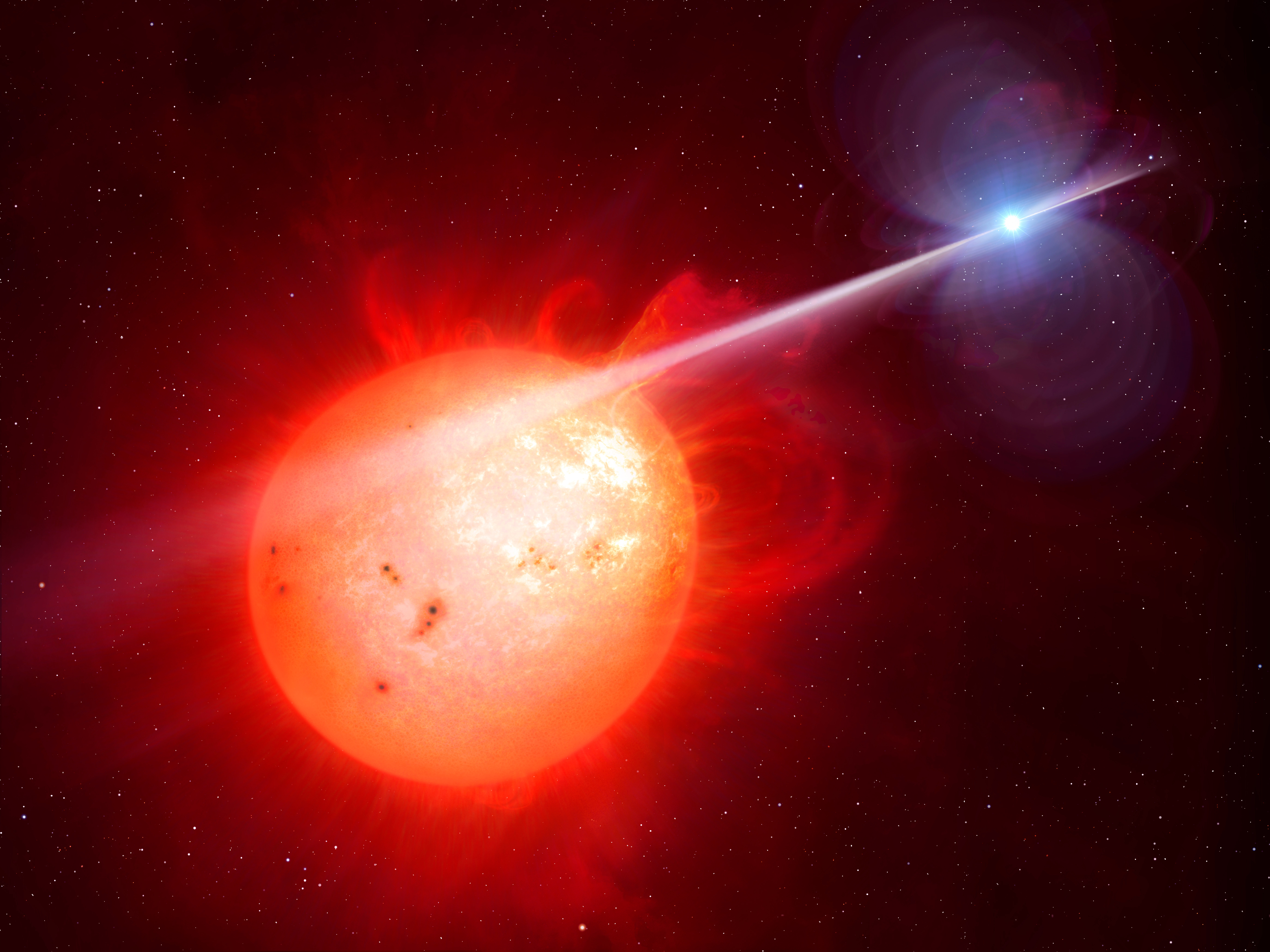
- Artist’s representation of the AR Scorpii system

Observation data Epoch J2018 Equinox ICRS
- Constellation: Scorpius
- Right ascension: 16^{h} 21^{m} 47.29576^{s}
- Declination: −22° 53′ 11.3164″

Characteristics
- Apparent magnitude (G): 13.6 - 16.9

White dwarf
- Evolutionary stage: White dwarf

Red dwarf
- Evolutionary stage: Main sequence
- Spectral type: M5

Astrometry
Proper motion (μ)	RA: +9.48+0.04 −0.07 mas/yr Dec.: −51.32+0.22 −0.38 mas/yr
Parallax (π)	8.52±0.07 mas
Distance	383 ± 3 ly (117.4 ± 1.0 pc)

Details

White dwarf
Mass	1.0±0.1 M_{☉}
Radius	0.01 R_{☉}
Radius	7000 km
Rotation	1.95 minutes

Red dwarf
Mass	0.31 M_{☉}

Other designations
- AR Sco, 2MASS J16214728-2253102

Database references
SIMBAD	data

AR Scorpii (AR Sco) is a binary star system that consists of a pulsar-like white dwarf and a red dwarf star. It is located close to the ecliptic plane in the constellation Scorpius. Parallax measurements made with very-long-baseline interferometry put the system at a distance of about 117.4 parsecs (383 light-years).

Artist’s impression of the AR Scorpii system

In 1904 Henrietta Swan Leavitt and Edward Charles Pickering announced the discovery of this variable star. It was given its variable star designation, AR Scorpii, in 1914.

== Observations ==
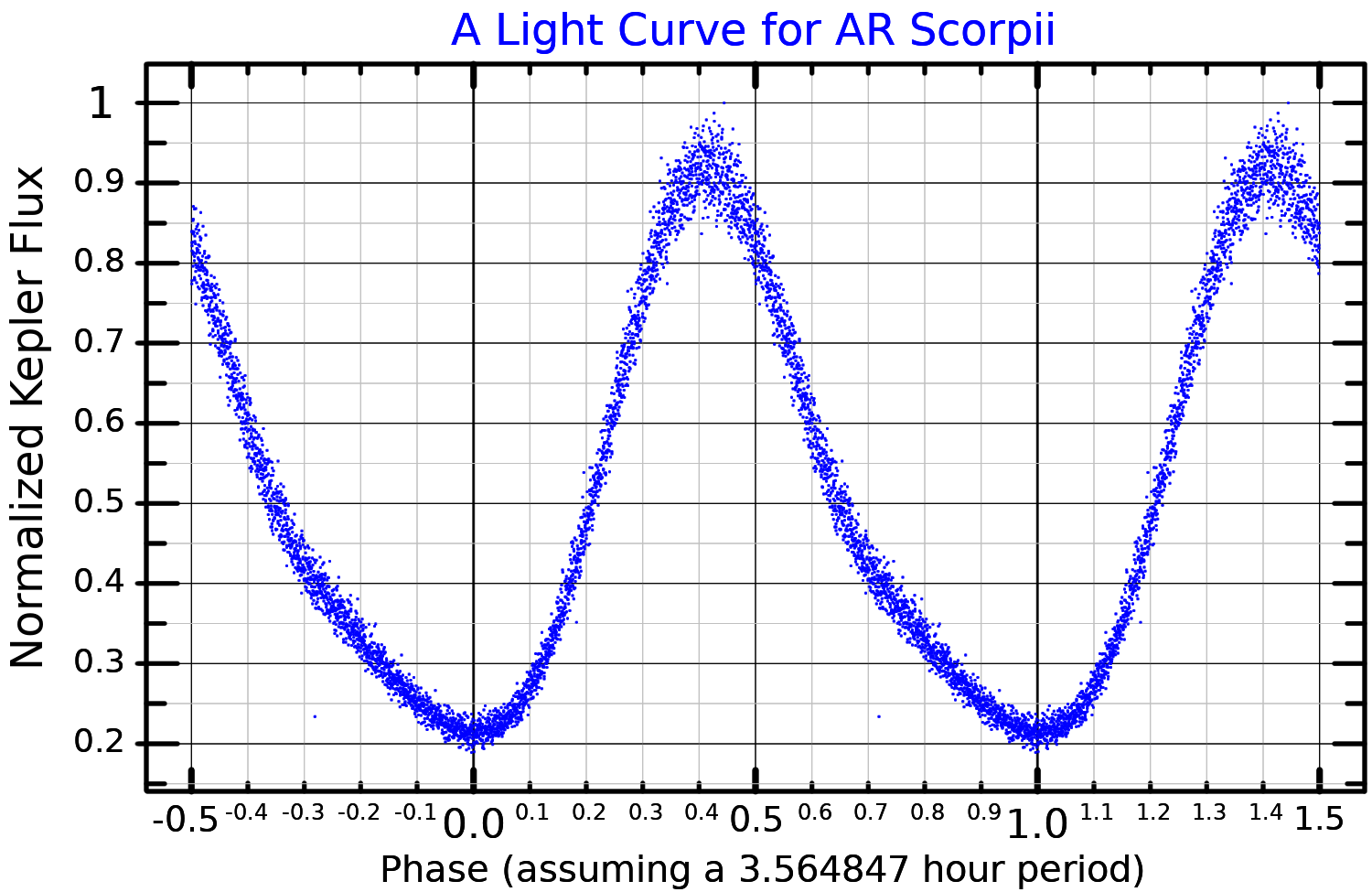
A broadband optical light curve for AR Scorpii, plotted from Kepler data

AR Scorpii is the first "white dwarf-pulsar" to be discovered. Its unusual nature was first noticed by amateur astronomers. The 3.56-hour period in AR Scorpii's light curve caused it to be misclassified as a Delta Scuti variable, but in 2016, this period was found to be the binary orbital period. In addition, the system shows very strong optical, ultraviolet, and radio pulsations originating from the red dwarf with a period of just 1.97 minutes, which is a beat period from the orbital rotation and the white dwarf spin. These pulsations occur when a relativistic beam from the white dwarf sweeps across the red dwarf, which then reprocesses the beam into the observed electromagnetic energy. Although the white dwarf shows evidence of accretion in the past, at present it is not accreting significantly, and the system is powered by the spin-down of the white dwarf. The white dwarf's rotation will slow down on a timescale of 10^{7} years. It has a radius of about 7×10^{3} km, about the same size as Earth.

== See also ==
- AE Aquarii - the first discovered white dwarf pulsar.
- Pulsar-like white dwarfs
