= Intermediate polar =

Type of binary star system with a white dwarf and main-sequence star

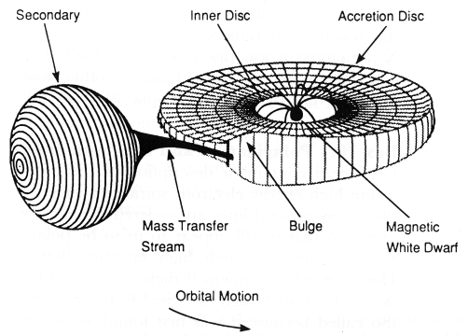
Diagram of an intermediate polar. Matter flows from the companion star into an accretion disk around the white dwarf, but is disrupted by the white dwarf's magnetic field.

In astronomy, an intermediate polar (also called a DQ Herculis Star) is a type of cataclysmic variable, binary star system with a white dwarf and a cool main-sequence secondary star. In most cataclysmic variables, matter from the companion star is gravitationally stripped by the compact star and forms an accretion disk around it. In intermediate polar systems, the same general scenario applies except that the inner disk is disrupted by the magnetic field of the white dwarf.

The name "intermediate polar" is derived from the strength of the white dwarf's magnetic field, which is between that of non-magnetic cataclysmic variable systems and strongly magnetic systems. Non-magnetic systems exhibit full accretion disks, while strongly magnetic systems (called polars or AM Herculis systems) exhibit only accretion streams which directly impact the white dwarf's magnetosphere.

There were 26 confirmed intermediate polar systems as of 14 April 2006. This represents about 1% of the 1,830 total cataclysmic variable systems presented by Downes et al. (2006) in the Catalog of Cataclysmic Variables. Only two of them are brighter than 15th magnitude at minimum: the prototype DQ Herculis, and the unusual slow nova, GK Persei.

== System structure ==
In intermediate polar systems, material stripped from a red dwarf secondary star flows into an accretion disk around the white dwarf, but the inner disk is truncated by the magnetic field of the white dwarf. In extreme instances, the disk can be fully disrupted, although this is uncommon. In the region where the disk is truncated, the gas in the disk begins to travel along the white dwarf's magnetic field lines, forming curved sheets of luminous material called accretion curtains. Disk material passes through the curtains and then accretes onto the white dwarf near one of its magnetic poles.

== Physical Properties ==
Intermediate polar systems are strong x-ray emitters. The x-rays are generated by high velocity particles from the accretion stream forming a shock as they fall onto the surface of the white dwarf star. As particles decelerate and cool before hitting the white dwarf surface, bremsstrahlung x-rays are produced and may subsequently be absorbed by gas surrounding the shock region.

The magnetic field strength of white dwarfs in intermediate polar systems are typically 1 million to 10 million gauss (100–1000 teslas). This is about a million times stronger than the Earth's magnetic field and towards the upper limit of magnetic field strengths that can be produced in a laboratory on Earth, but is much less than the magnetic field strength of neutron stars. At the intersection of the accretion stream and the surface of the white dwarf, a hot spot is produced. Because the white dwarf has a dipole magnetic field, it will have one hot spot at each of its magnetic poles. As the white dwarf and its dipole magnetic field spin, the hot spots will spin also.

Other defining characteristics of intermediate polars include a strong Helium II emission line at 468.6 nm and circular polarization, in addition to the light curve periodicities described below.

== Light curve periodicities ==
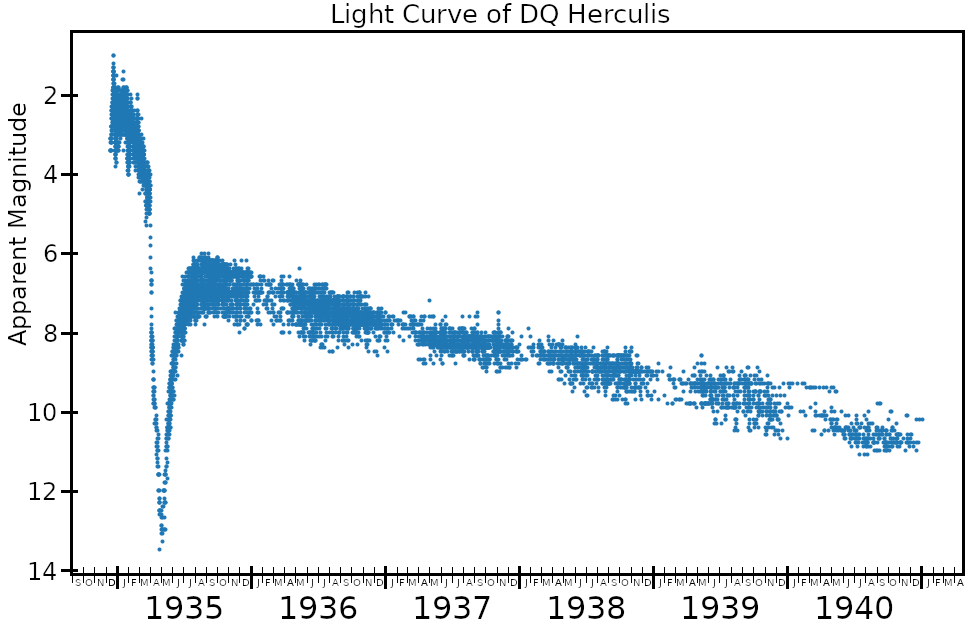
The light curve of DQ Herculis, from AAVSO data. The pronounced "dust dip" roughly four months after peak brightness was caused by dust forming as the ejected shell expanded and cooled.

The light curve of an intermediate polar may show several types of stable periodic changes in brightness. One periodicity is related to the orbital period of the binary star system. The orbital periods of confirmed intermediate polars range from 1.4 to 48 hours, with typical values between 3 and 6 hours.

A second periodic signal originates from the rotation of the white dwarf spinning on its axis. The observational characteristic that most clearly defines an intermediate polar is the existence of a spin period signal that is shorter than the orbital period. The known periods range from 33 to 4022 seconds. The physical cause of optical spin-period oscillations is usually attributed to the changing viewing aspect of the accretion curtain as it converges near the white dwarf.

A third light curve periodicity, the sideband period between the spin period and the orbital period, is also often present.

All three periodic signals may be measured by taking a fourier transform of the light curve and producing a power spectrum. Intermediate polars produce spin and sideband periodicities in x-ray, ultraviolet, and optical wavelengths. Although the source of the periods in all three wavelengths is ultimately the white dwarf spin, the exact mechanisms for producing the high-energy periodicities and the optical periodicities are thought to be different.

In addition to the stable oscillations, unstable oscillations called "quasi-periodic oscillations" may appear and then die off after a few cycles. Quasi-periodic oscillations typically have periods between 30 and 300 seconds.
