= Comet Alcock =

Comet Alcock or Alcock's Comet may refer to any of the five comets discovered by English astronomer, George Alcock, below:

- C/1959 Q1 (Alcock)
- C/1959 Q2 (Alcock)
- C/1963 F1 (Alcock), a non-periodic comet discovered in 1963 and had later disintegrated in the same year.
- C/1965 S2 (Alcock)
- C/1983 H1 (IRAS–Araki–Alcock), a long-period comet discovered in 1983 alongside the Infrared Astronomical Satellite and Genichi Araki
