= LV Vulpeculae =

Nova seen in 1968 in the constellation Vulpecula

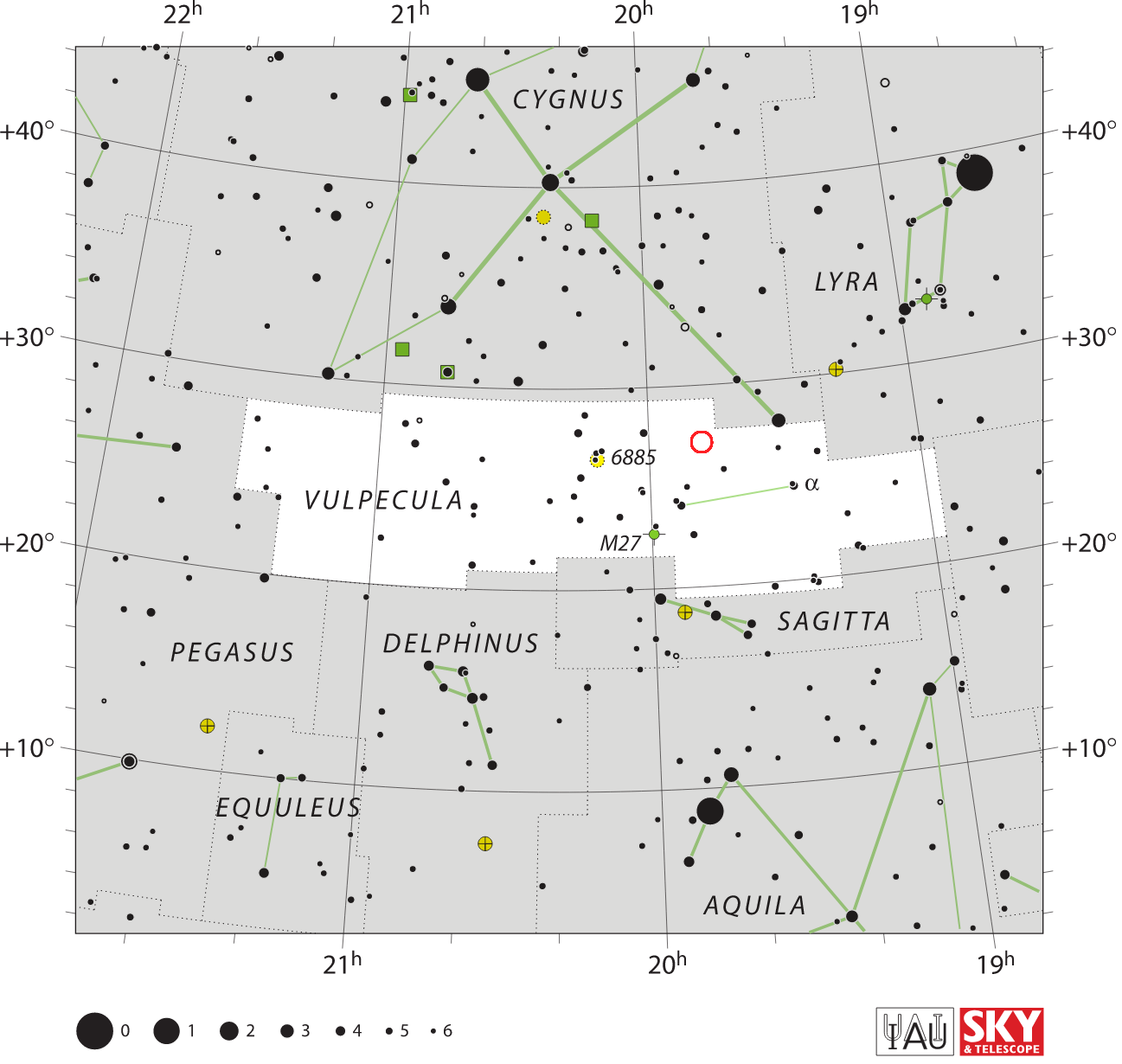
- Location of LV Vulpeculae (circled in red)

Observation data Epoch J2000 Equinox ICRS
- Constellation: Vulpecula
- Right ascension: 19^{h} 48^{m} 00.437^{s}
- Declination: 27° 10′ 17.36″
- Apparent magnitude (V): 4.79 - 16.9

Characteristics
- Variable type: Classical Nova

Other designations
- Nova Vul 1968 a, AAVSO 1943+26, 2MASS J19480043+2710173

Database references
SIMBAD	data

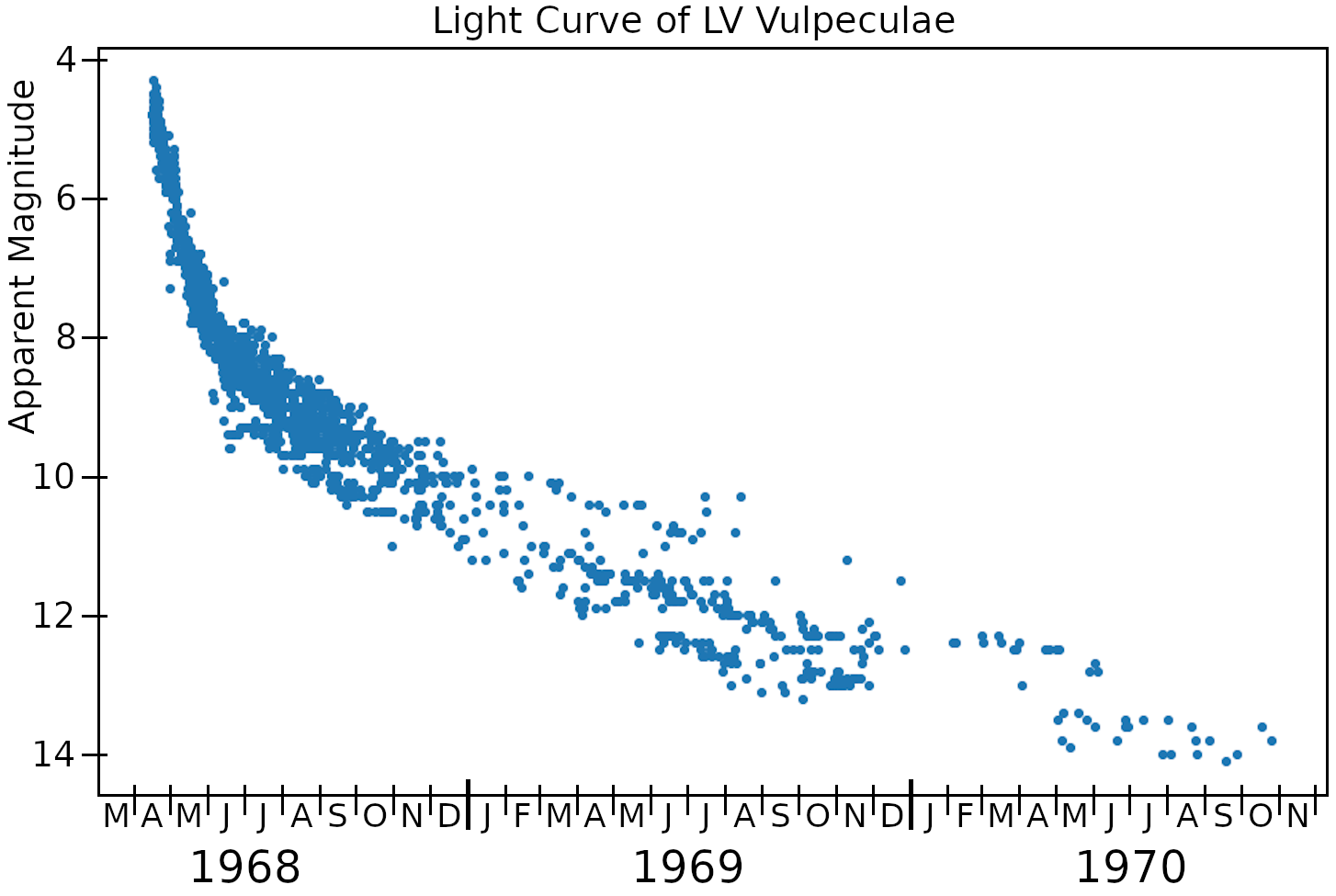
The light curve of LV Vulpeculae plotted from AAVSO data

LV Vulpeculae, also known as Nova Vulpeculae 1968 no. 1, was the first of two novae in the constellation of Vulpecula which erupted in 1968. It was discovered by George Alcock who observed it from the back garden of his home in Farcet, England, on the morning of 15 April 1968. The next night it was independently discovered by Midtskogen in Norway. It reached a peak apparent magnitude of 4.79 on 17 April 1968. It was visible to the naked eye at the same time HR Delphini (also discovered by George Alcock) was a naked eye object, and the two novae were less than 15 degrees apart on the sky.

Before its eruption, LV Vulpeculae was a magnitude 16.2 object. It is classified as a "fast nova", meaning its brightness declined by more than 3 magnitudes in less than 100 days.

A small emission nebula (shell), a few arc seconds in diameter, has been detected surrounding this nova. However, there are several field stars overlapping the nebula, which makes deriving quantitative information from shell images difficult.

All novae are binary stars, with a "donor" star orbiting a white dwarf. The two stars are so close to each other that matter is transferred from the donor star to the white dwarf. LV Vulpeculae has a carbon-oxygen white dwarf component with an estimated mass of 1.1 M_{☉} and it is receiving 2×10^{−9} M_{☉} per year of material from the donor star.

Distance estimates for LV Vulpeculae vary widely, ranging from 820±50 parsecs to 4,090±220 parsecs.
