= GI Monocerotis =

1918 Nova in the constellation Monoceros

- A Heidelberg Observatory photographic plate taken on 5 March 1918 showing the nova outburst of GI Monocerotis, compared with the same region photographed during the Sloan Digital Sky Survey more than 80 years later.

Observation data Epoch J2000.0 Equinox ICRS
- Constellation: Monoceros
- Right ascension: 07^{h} 26^{m} 47.107^{s}
- Declination: −06° 40′ 29.71″
- Apparent magnitude (V): 5.6 - 18

Characteristics
- Variable type: Nova

Astrometry
Proper motion (μ)	RA: −2.955 mas/yr Dec.: 0.550 mas/yr
Parallax (π)	0.2880±0.0446 mas
Distance	approx. 11,000 ly (approx. 3,500 pc)
Absolute magnitude (M_{V})	−7.18 (max) +3.62 (min)

Details

White dwarf
Mass	0.95±0.1 M_{☉}

Other designations
- GI Mon, Nova Monocerotis 1918, HD 58756, AAVSO 0721-06

Database references
SIMBAD	data

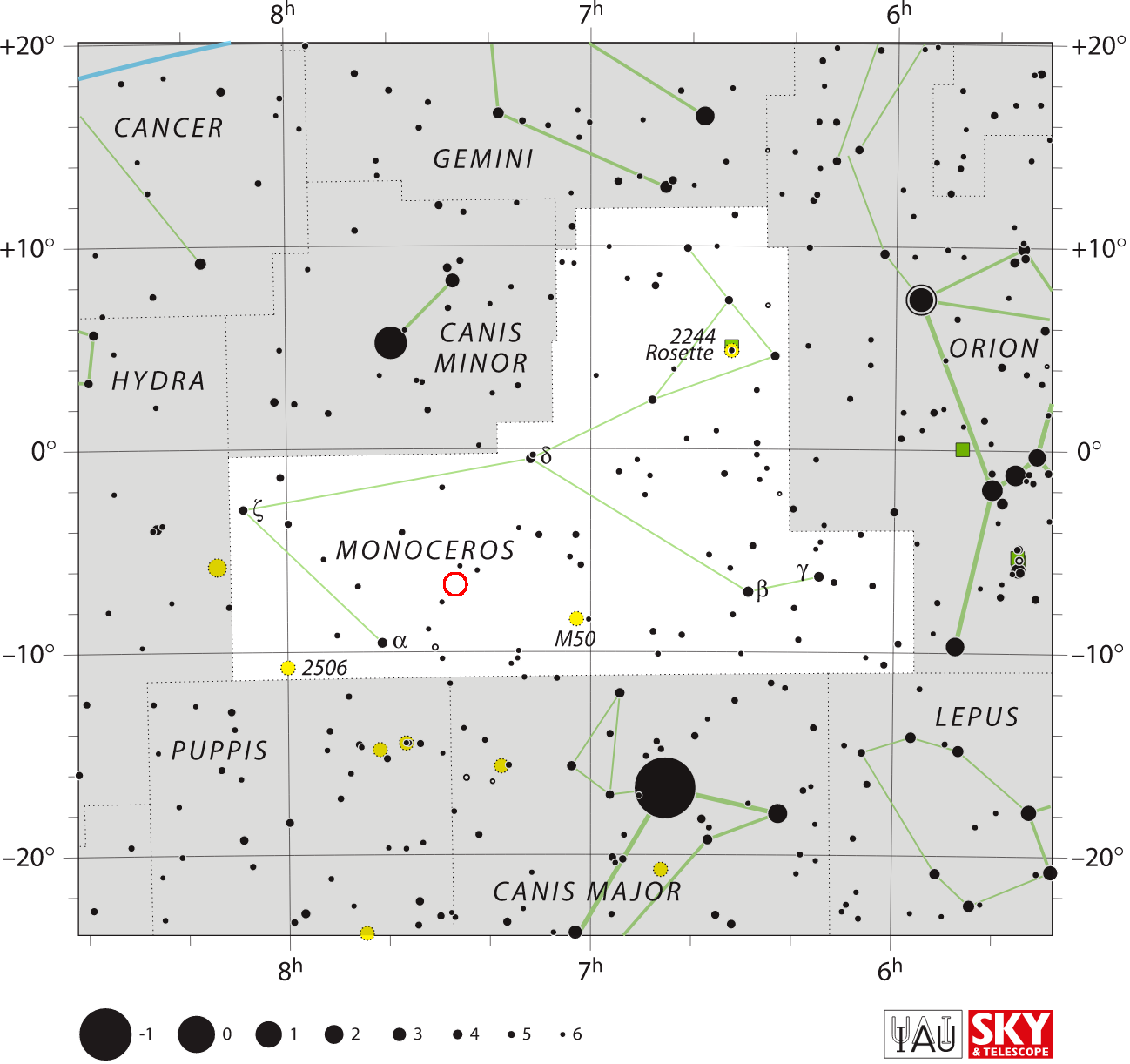
The location of GI Monocerotis (circled in red)

GI Monocerotis, also known as Nova Monocerotis 1918, was a nova that erupted in the constellation Monoceros during 1918. It was discovered by Max Wolf on a photographic plate taken at the Heidelberg Observatory on 4 February 1918. At the time of its discovery, it had a photographic magnitude of 8.5, and had already passed its peak brightness. A search of plates taken at the Harvard College Observatory showed that it had a photographic magnitude of 5.4 on 1 January 1918, so it would have been visible to the naked eye around that time. By March 1918 it had dropped to ninth or tenth magnitude. By November 1920 it was a little fainter than 15th magnitude.

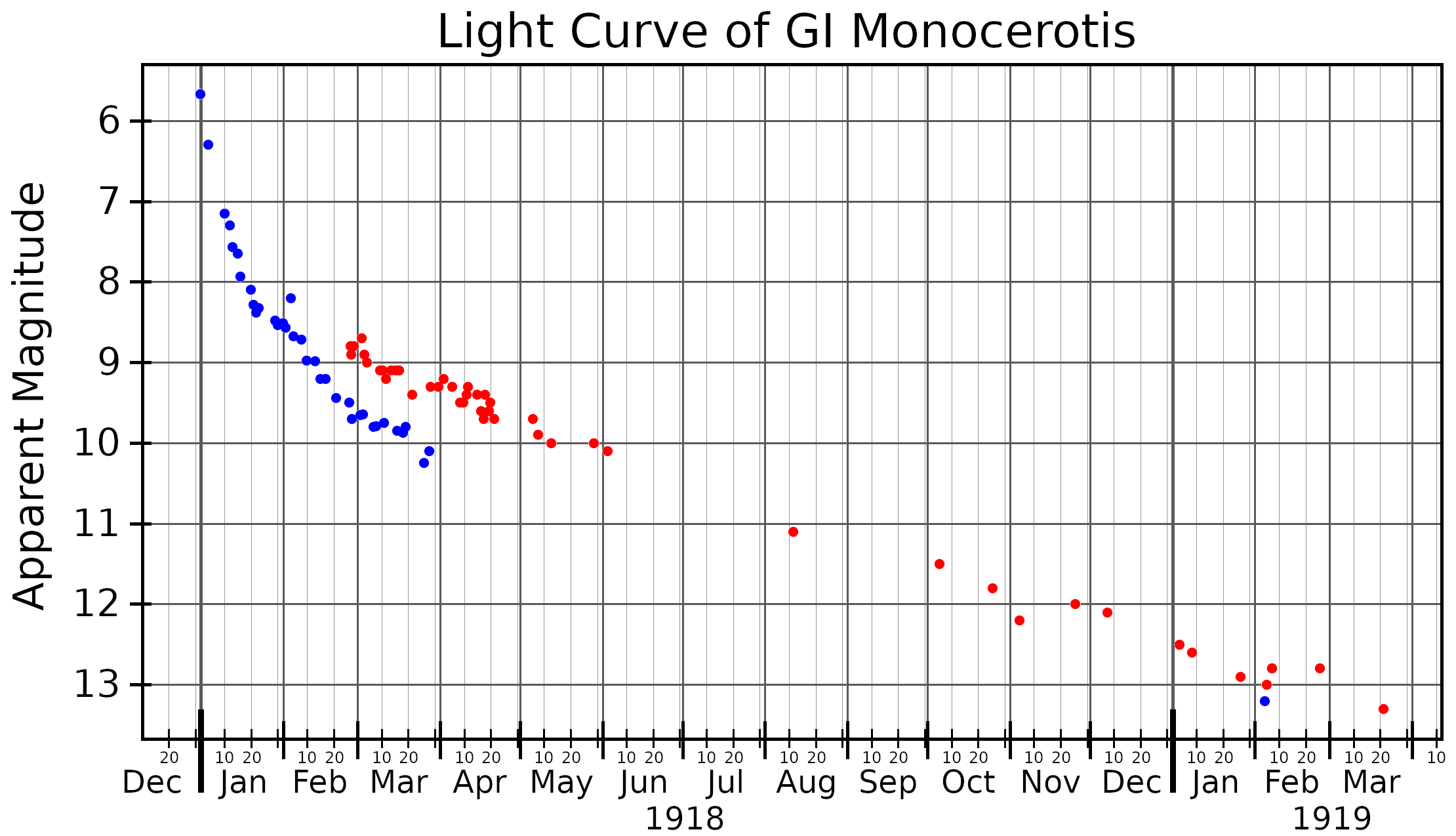
The light curve of the GI Monocerotis. The blue points are photographic magnitudes measured at the Harvard College Observatory. If multiple measurements with identical times were reported, they were averaged before plotting The red points are visual magnitudes from the AAVSO.

A single pre-eruption photographic detection of GI Monocerotis exists, showing its magnitude was 15.1 before the nova event. GI Monoceros dropped by 3 magnitudes from its peak in about 23 days, making it a "fast nova". Long after the nova eruption, six small outbursts with a mean amplitude of 0.9 magnitudes were detected when the star was monitored from the year 1991 through 2000. Radio emission from the nova has been detected at the JVLA in the C (5 GHz), X (8 GHz) and K (23 GHz) bands.

All novae are binary stars, with a "donor" star orbiting a white dwarf. The two stars are so close together that matter is transferred from the donor star to the white dwarf. Worpel et al. report that the orbital period for the binary is probably 4.33 hours, and there is a 48.6 minute period which may represent the rotation period for the white dwarf. Their X-ray observations indicate that GI Mon is a non-magnetic cataclysmic variable star, meaning that the material lost from the donor star forms an accretion disk around the white dwarf, rather than flowing directly to the surface of the white dwarf. It is estimated that the donor star is transferring 3×10^{−9} M_{☉} of material to the accretion disk each year.

A 1995 search for an optically resolved nova remnant using the Anglo-Australian Telescope was unsuccessful.
