= V1500 Cygni =

Star in the constellation Cygnus

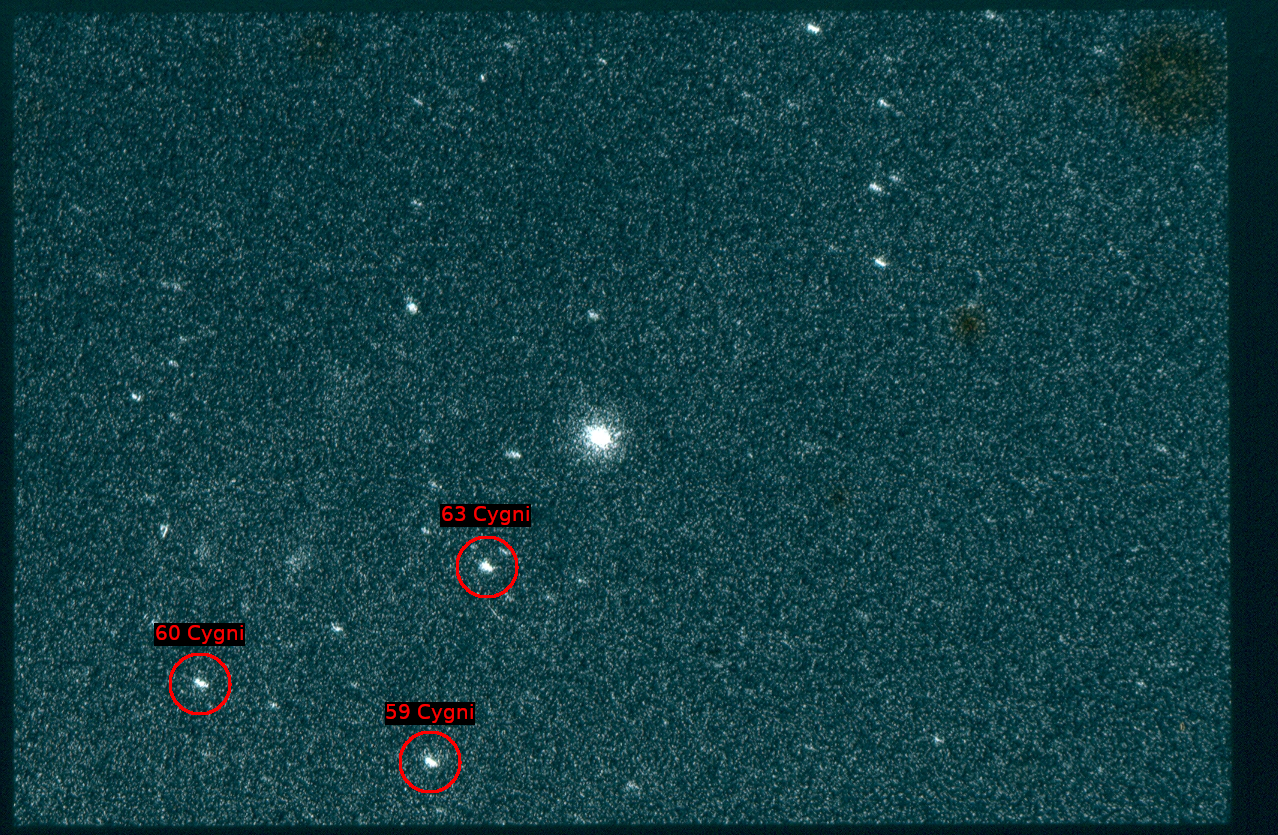
- Nova Cygni 1975 (center), photographed at 07:00 UT August 30, 1975. Also shown are 59 Cygni (magnitude 4.8), 60 Cygni (magnitude 5.4) and 63 Cygni (magnitude 4.5)

Observation data Epoch J2000.0 Equinox ICRS
- Constellation: Cygnus
- Right ascension: 21^{h} 11^{m} 36.5810^{s}
- Declination: +48° 09′ 01.952″
- Apparent magnitude (V): 1.69 to <21

Characteristics
- Variable type: Fast nova + asynchronous polar

Astrometry
Proper motion (μ)	RA: −6.449(131) mas/yr Dec.: −5.572(112) mas/yr
Parallax (π)	0.6427±0.1087 mas
Distance	approx. 5,100 ly (approx. 1,600 pc)
Absolute magnitude (M_{V})	−10.7 (maximum) to +7.8 (minimum)

Details

WD
Mass	1.20 M_{☉}
Radius	0.009 R_{☉}
Luminosity	5 L_{☉}
Temperature	54,000 K

donor
Mass	~0.22 M_{☉}
Radius	0.42 R_{☉}
Temperature	3,000 - 5,200 K

Other designations
- Nova Cyg 1975, AAVSO 2108+47, AAVSO 2108+47, Gaia DR3 2165295912482637312

Database references
SIMBAD	data

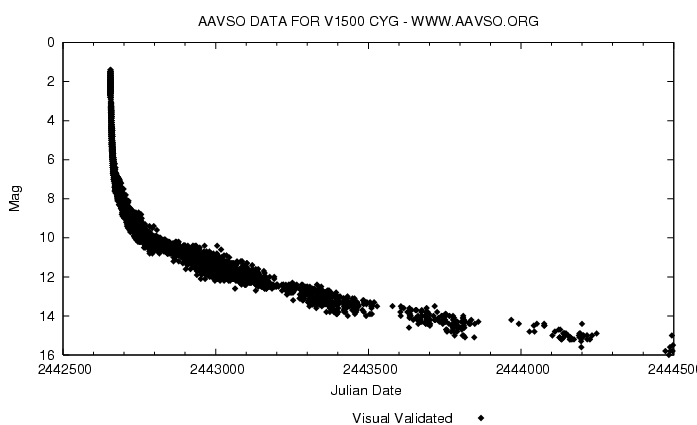
AAVSO light curve for Nova Cygni 1975. The dates given are Julian day numbers.

V1500 Cygni or Nova Cygni 1975 was a bright nova occurring in 1975 in the constellation Cygnus. It had the second highest intrinsic brightness of any nova of the 20th century, exceeded only by CP Puppis in 1942. V1500 Cygni was firstly reported by Minoru Honda of Kurashiki, Japan at 13h40m, 29 August 1975 (UT), shining at an apparent brightness of magnitude 3.0. But the first discoverer in time was Kentaro Osada (August 29, 11h30m UT). It had brightened to magnitude 1.7 on the next day, and then rapidly faded. It remained visible to the naked eye for about a week, and 680 days after reaching maximum the star had dimmed by 12.5 magnitudes.

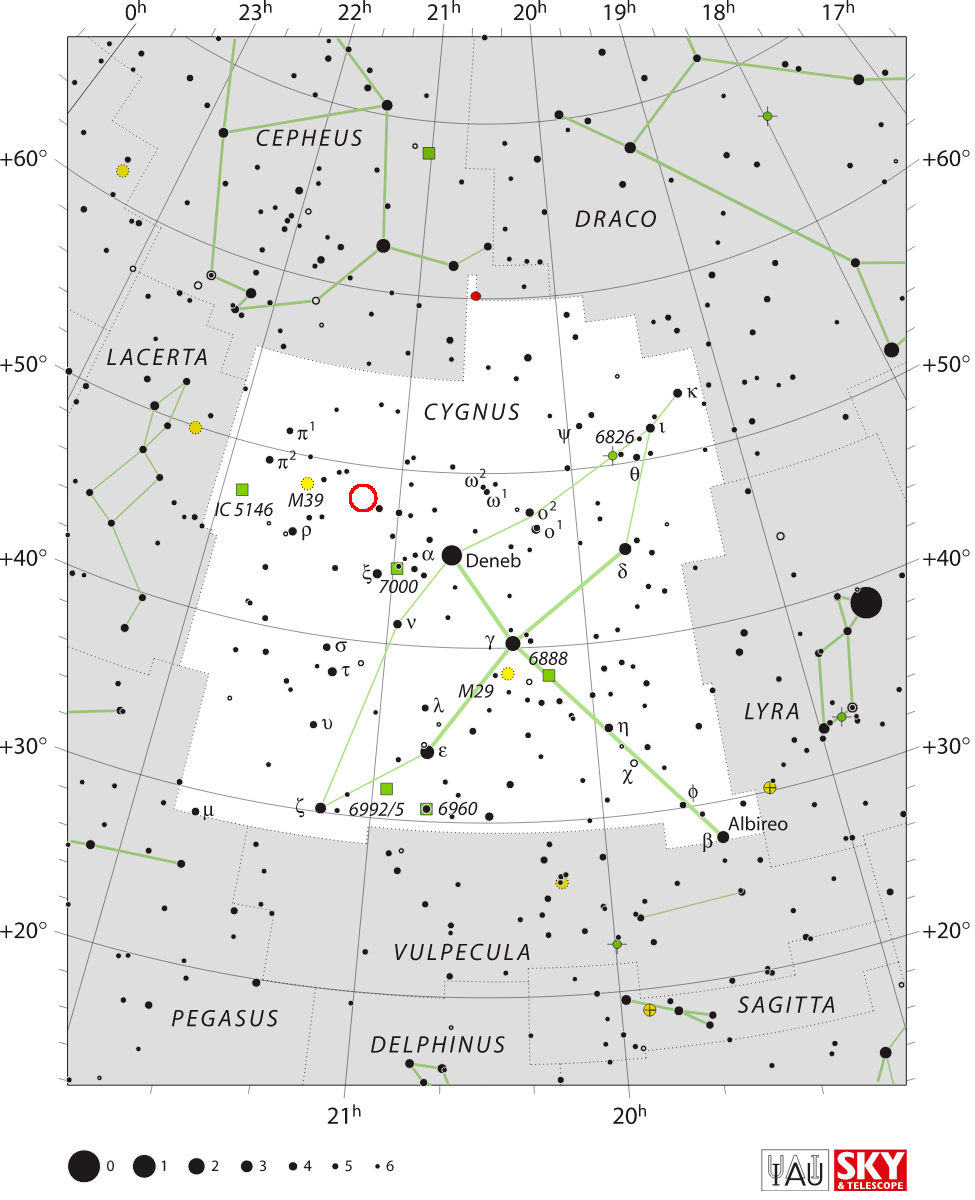
The location of V1500 Cygni (circled in red)

It is an AM Herculis type star, consisting of a red dwarf secondary depositing a stream of material onto a highly magnetized white dwarf primary. The distance of the V1500 Cygni was calculated in 1977 by the McDonald Observatory at 1.95 kiloparsecs (6,360 light years). More recently the Gaia space observatory determined a distance of approximately 5,100 light years. Additionally, V1500 Cyg was the first asynchronous polar to be discovered. This distinction refers to the fact that the white dwarf's spin period is slightly different from the binary orbital period. However, by 2016, x-ray observations strongly suggested that the white dwarf rotation had returned to normal synchronization with the orbit.

V1500 Cygni has a remnant typical of very fast novae, consisting of some clumps and some spherically symmetric diffuse material.

== See also ==
- Nova Cygni 1920
- Nova Cygni 1992
