= V838 Herculis =

1991 Nova seen in the constellation Hercules

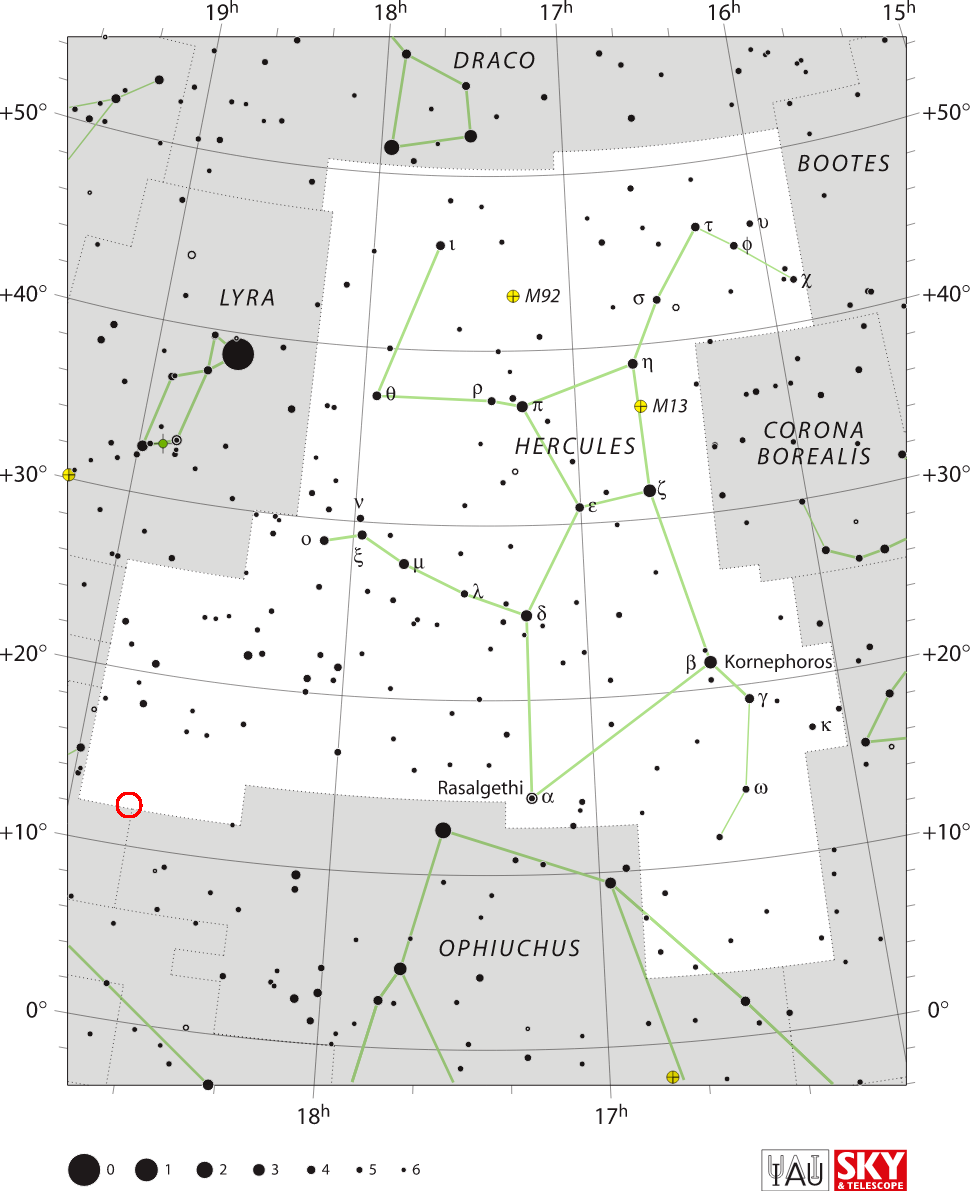
- Location of V838 Hercules (circled in red)

Observation data Epoch J2000.0 Equinox ICRS
- Constellation: Hercules
- Right ascension: 18^{h} 46^{m} 31.471^{s}
- Declination: +12° 14′ 02.10″
- Apparent magnitude (V): 5.3 Max. 19.1 Min.

Characteristics
- Variable type: Nova, eclipsing binary

Astrometry
Proper motion (μ)	RA: −2.691±1.666 mas/yr Dec.: −6.600±1.930 mas/yr
Parallax (π)	0.4642±0.7106 mas
Distance	2530+3434 −636 pc

Other designations
- Nova Her 1991, AAVSO 1841+12, 2MASS J18463156+1214007, Gaia DR2 4504548029183559552

Database references
SIMBAD	data

V838 Herculis, also known as Nova Herculis 1991, was a nova which occurred in the constellation Hercules in 1991. It was discovered by George Alcock of Yaxley, Cambridgeshire, England at 4:35 UT on the morning of 25 March 1991. He found it with 10×50 binoculars, and on that morning its apparent visual magnitude was 5 (making it visible to the naked eye). Palomar Sky Survey plates showed that before the outburst, the star was at photographic magnitude 20.6 (blue light) and 18.25 (red light).

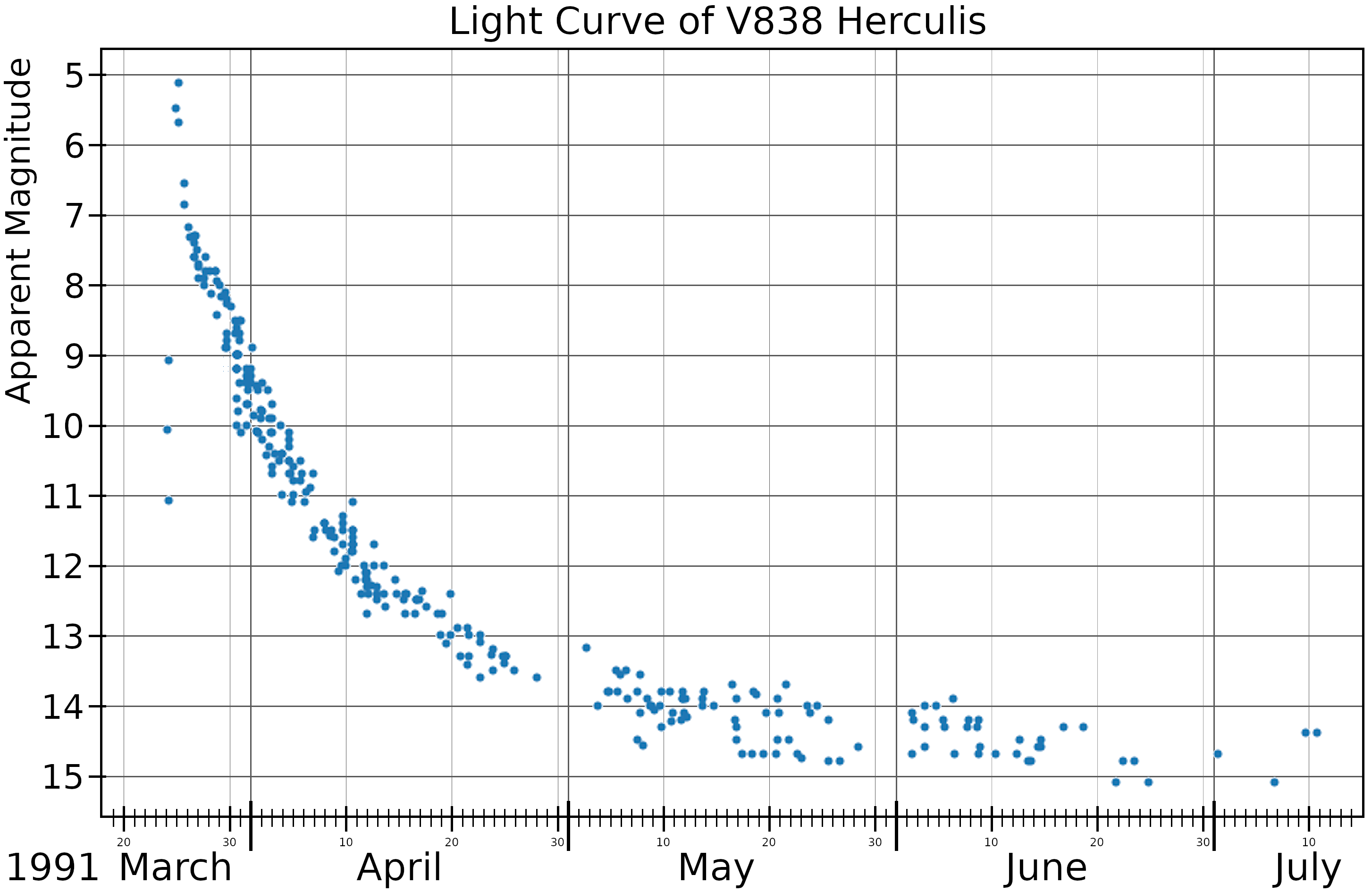
The light curve of V838 Herculis plotted from data presented in Woodward et al. and AAVSO data

V838 Herculis declined from its peak brightness very quickly, fading by 2 magnitudes in less than three days, making it one of the fastest classical novae ever recorded.

All novae are binary stars, with a "donor" star orbiting a white dwarf. The two stars are so close to each other that material is transferred from the donor to the white dwarf. Because the distance between the two stars is comparable to the radius of the donor star, novae are often eclipsing binaries, and V838 Herculis does show such eclipses. The eclipses were first detected a few weeks after the nova outburst, and they show the system's orbital period to be 7 hours, 8 minutes and 36 seconds as of 1991. The shape of the eclipse light curve suggests that the white dwarf itself is not being eclipsed by the donor, but rather that the accretion disk surrounding the white dwarf is being partially eclipsed. The depth of the eclipses was initially only 0.1 magnitudes, but grew over the year following the nova event to 0.7 magnitudes, indicating that the accretion disk re-established itself after the nova outburst during that time.

The white dwarf in the V838 Herculis system is an oxygen-neon-magnesium white dwarf, with a mass of about 1.35 M_{☉}, which is near the Chandrasekhar limit for white dwarf masses. The donor star is believed to be a main sequence star.
