= V1974 Cygni =

Star in the constellation Cygnus

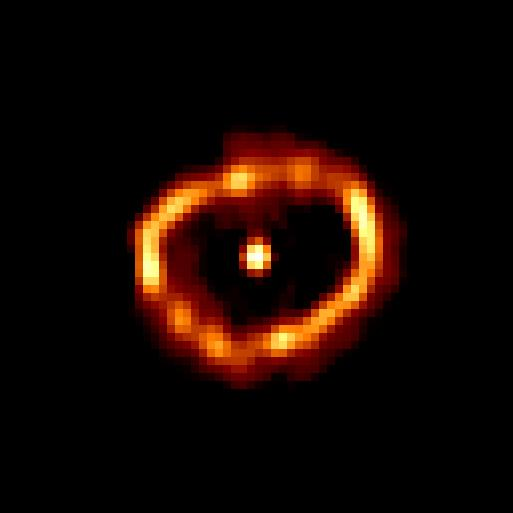
- An HST image of V1974 Cygni, taken in January 1994, shortly after the repair mission to correct the HST's flawed optics.

Observation data Epoch J2000.0 Equinox ICRS
- Constellation: Cygnus
- Right ascension: 20^{h} 30^{m} 31.61^{s}
- Declination: +52° 37′ 51.3″
- Apparent magnitude (V): 4.3 (max) >21 (min)

Astrometry
Distance	1631+261 −131 pc

Characteristics
- Variable type: neon nova

Other designations
- Nova Cyg 1975, V1974 Cyg, AAVSO 2027+52, 2MASS J20303161+5237513

Database references
SIMBAD	data

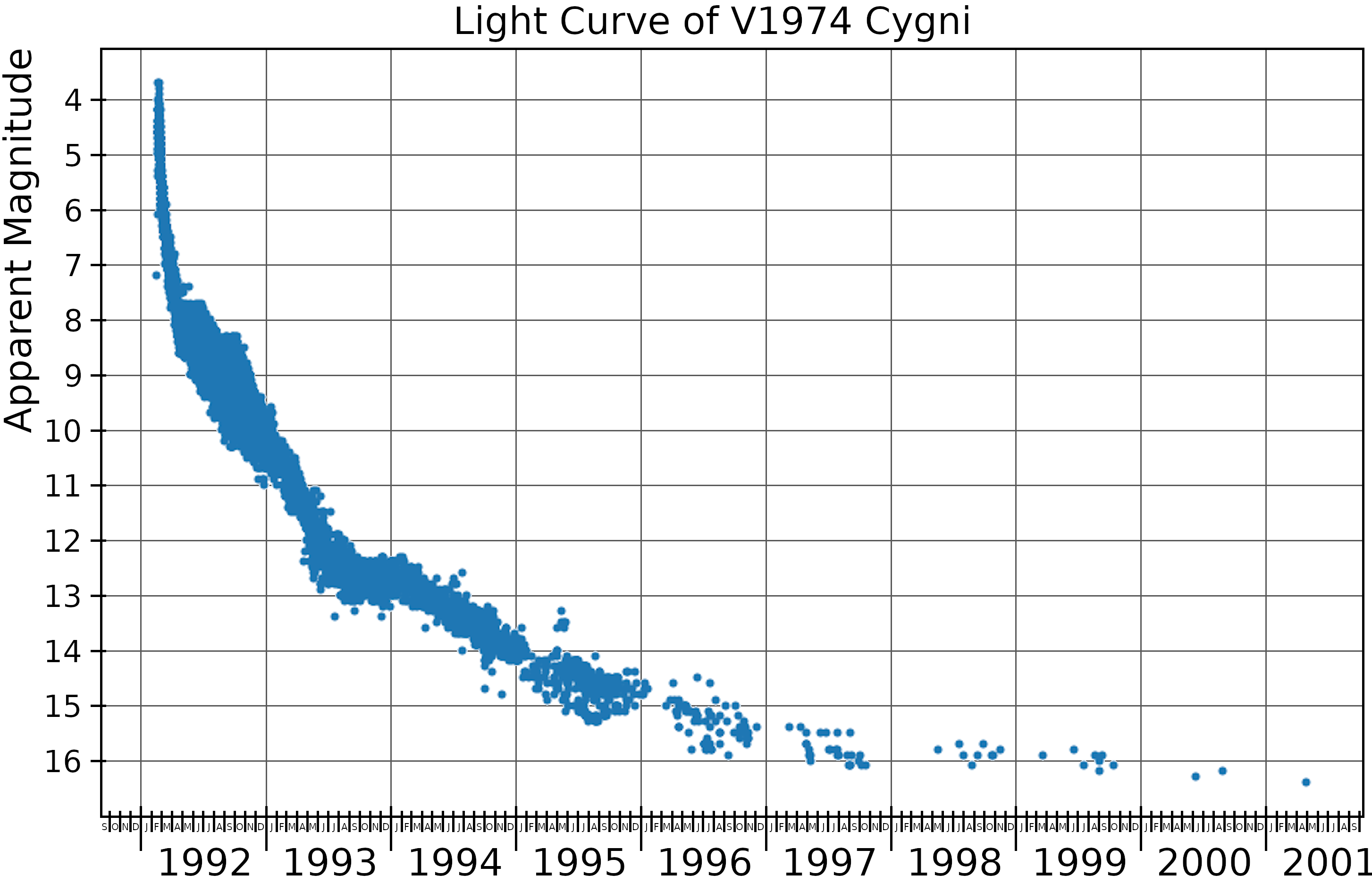
The light curve of V1974 Cygni, plotted from AAVSO data

V1974 Cygni or Nova Cygni 1992 was a nova, visible to the naked eye, in the constellation Cygnus. It was discovered visually with 10×50 binoculars on February 19, 1992, by Peter Collins, an amateur astronomer living in Boulder, Colorado. At that time he first noticed it, it had an apparent magnitude of 7.2. Nine hours later he saw it again, and it had brightened by a full magnitude. For this discovery Collins was awarded the AAVSO Nova Award in 1993. The nova reached magnitude 4.4 at 22:00 UT on 22 February 1992. Images from the Palomar Sky Survey taken before the nova event showed a possible precursor which had photographic magnitudes of 18 (blue light) and 17 (red light), but the identification of the precursor is not firm.

V1974 Cygni declined from peak brightness by three magnitudes in 43 days, making it a "fast" nova. Its light curve is classified as type P (Plateau), and it may be a recurrent nova.

In 1995, V1974 Cygni was observed with the Very Large Array at 1.49, 4.9, 8.4, 14.9 and 22.5 GHz. It was also studied with the Hubble Space Telescope instrument the High Speed Photometer. The instrument recorded a short amount of ultraviolet photometry. The nova was also observed in the far-ultraviolet by Voyager 2. It was observed, but not detected, with the Compton Gamma Ray Observatory. It was the first nova to be observed throughout the electromagnetic spectrum, from radio waves to γ-rays.

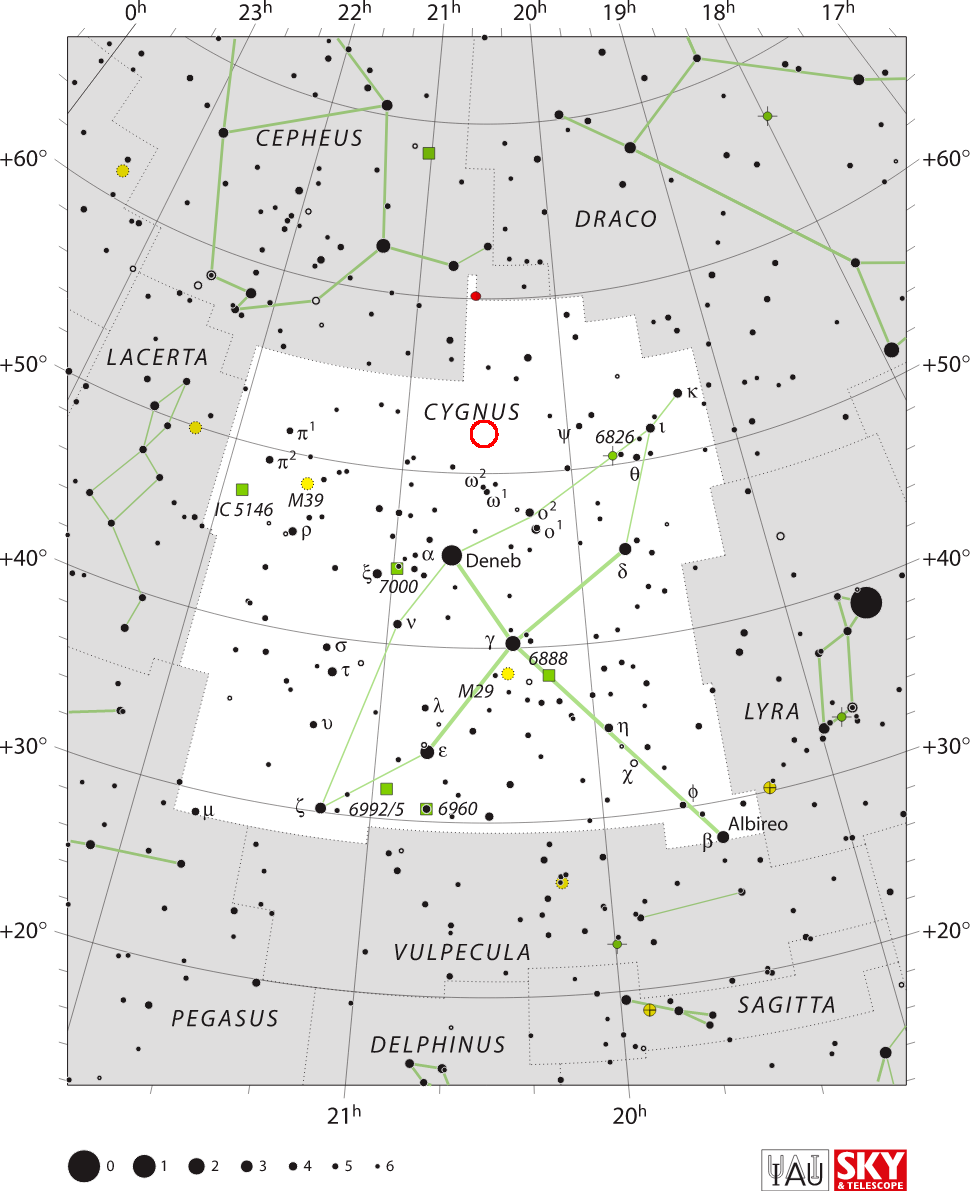
The location of V1974 Cygni (circled in red)

All novae are binary stars, with a "donor" star orbiting a white dwarf. The two stars are so close to each other that matter is transferred from the donor to the white dwarf. In the case of V1974 Cygni, the binary's orbital period is 1 hour, 57 minutes. The nova has an oxygen-neon-magnesium white dwarf primary, making it a neon nova. Estimates of the mass of the white dwarf range from 0.98 M_{☉} to 1.12M_{☉}, and it is estimated to be acquiring 3.2 × 10^{−10} M_{☉} yr^{−1} of material from the donor star.

V1974 Cygni has a nova remnant shell which has been observed several times with the Hubble Space Telescope, as well as with the Infrared Space Observatory. The shell is nearly circular, and its radius as of 10 February 1998 was 0.983 arc seconds. It is expanding at a rate of about 0.26 milli arc seconds per day. The remnant was also imaged in 6 cm radio waves with the MERLIN interferometer.

== See also ==
- Nova Cygni 1975
