= 3174 Alcock =

Asteroid

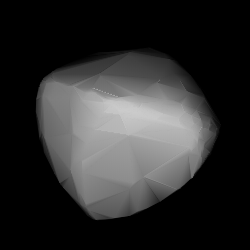
- Shape model of Alcock from its lightcurve

Discovery
- Discovered by: E. Bowell
- Discovery site: Anderson Mesa Stn.
- Discovery date: 26 October 1984

Designations
- Named after: George Alcock (amateur astronomer)
- Alternative designations: 1984 UV · 1962 YD; 1969 BB · 1973 YO_{1} 1975 EO_{3} · 1978 RB_{1} 1978 TJ_{3} · 1979 YR_{8} 1980 AH · 1981 GF
- Minor planet category: main-belt · Themis

Orbital characteristics
- Epoch 4 September 2017 (JD 2458000.5)
- Uncertainty parameter 0
- Observation arc: 47.71 yr (17,426 days)
- Aphelion: 3.6932 AU
- Perihelion: 2.5991 AU
- Semi-major axis: 3.1462 AU
- Eccentricity: 0.1739
- Orbital period (sidereal): 5.58 yr (2,038 days)
- Mean anomaly: 296.20°
- Mean motion: 0° 10^{m} 35.76^{s} / day
- Inclination: 2.3715°
- Longitude of ascending node: 72.244°
- Argument of perihelion: 4.6082°

Physical characteristics
- Mean diameter: 18.66±0.80 km 18.71 km (calculated)
- Synodic rotation period: 7.05±0.01 h
- Geometric albedo: 0.08 (assumed); 0.102±0.009
- Spectral type: C (assumed)
- Absolute magnitude (H): 12.0 · 11.80

3174 Alcock (prov. designation: 1984 UV) is a carbonaceous Themistian asteroid from the outer region of the asteroid belt. It was discovered by American astronomer Edward Bowell at Lowell's U.S. Anderson Mesa Station in Flagstaff, Arizona, on 26 October 1984. The likely C-type asteroid has a rotation period of 7.1 hours and measures approximately 19 kilometers (12 miles) in diameter. It was named after British amateur astronomer George Alcock (1912–2000).

== Orbit and classification ==
The dark C-type asteroid is a member of the Themis family, a dynamical family of outer-belt asteroids with nearly coplanar ecliptical orbits. It orbits the Sun in the outer main-belt at a distance of 2.6–3.7 AU once every 5 years and 7 months (2,038 days). Its orbit has an eccentricity of 0.17 and an inclination of 2° with respect to the ecliptic. The first used observation was taken at Crimea–Nauchnij in 1973, when the body was identified as 1973 YO1, extending its observation arc by 11 years prior to the official discovery observation. However, the first images were already taken at the U.S. Goethe Link Observatory in 1962, while it was identified as 1962 YD.

== Naming ==
This minor planet was named by the discoverer for prolific British amateur astronomer George Alcock (1912–2000), who visually discovered 5 comets and 4 novae. The naming was published by the Minor Planet Center on 5 November 1987 (M.P.C. 12458).

== Physical characteristics ==
A rotational lightcurve of this asteroid was obtained from photometric observations made by French astronomer René Roy in February 2008. The lightcurve gave a rotation period of 7.05±0.01 hours with a brightness variation of 0.65 in magnitude (U=3-).

According to the spaced-based survey carried out by the Japanese Akari satellite, the asteroid measures 18.66 kilometers in diameter and its surface has an albedo of 0.102, while the Collaborative Asteroid Lightcurve Link assumes an albedo of 0.08 and calculates a diameter of 18.71 kilometers.
