= Farcet =

Village in Cambridgeshire, England

Coordinates: 52.537°N 0.229°W

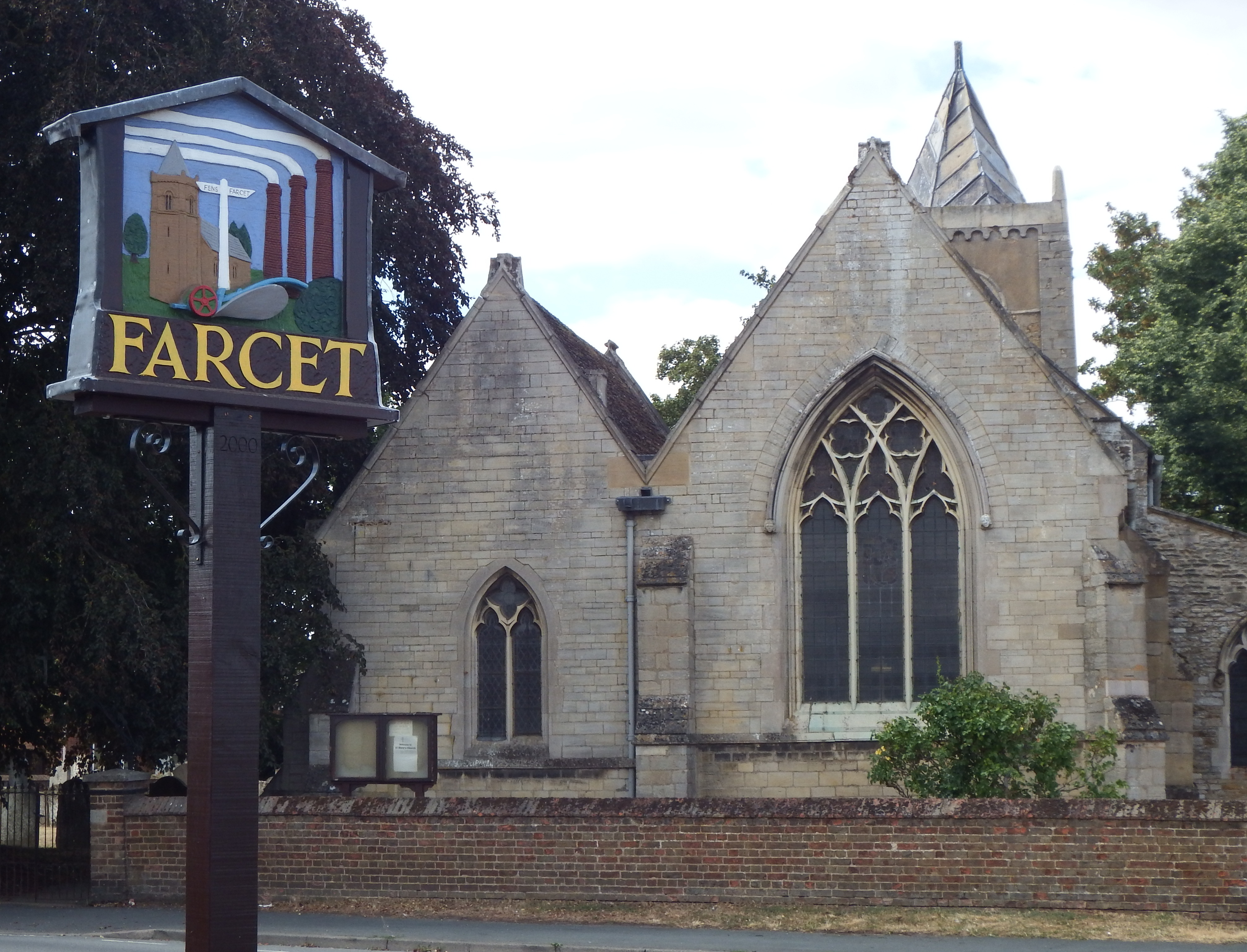
- Farcet village sign nearby the church of St. Mary

- Location within Cambridgeshire
- Population: 1,800 (2011)
- OS grid reference: TL198943
- District: Huntingdonshire
- Shire county: Cambridgeshire
- Region: East
- Country: England
- Sovereign state: United Kingdom
- Post town: Peterborough
- Postcode district: PE7
- Dialling code: 01733
- Police: Cambridgeshire
- Fire: Cambridgeshire
- Ambulance: East of England
- UK Parliament: North West Cambridgeshire

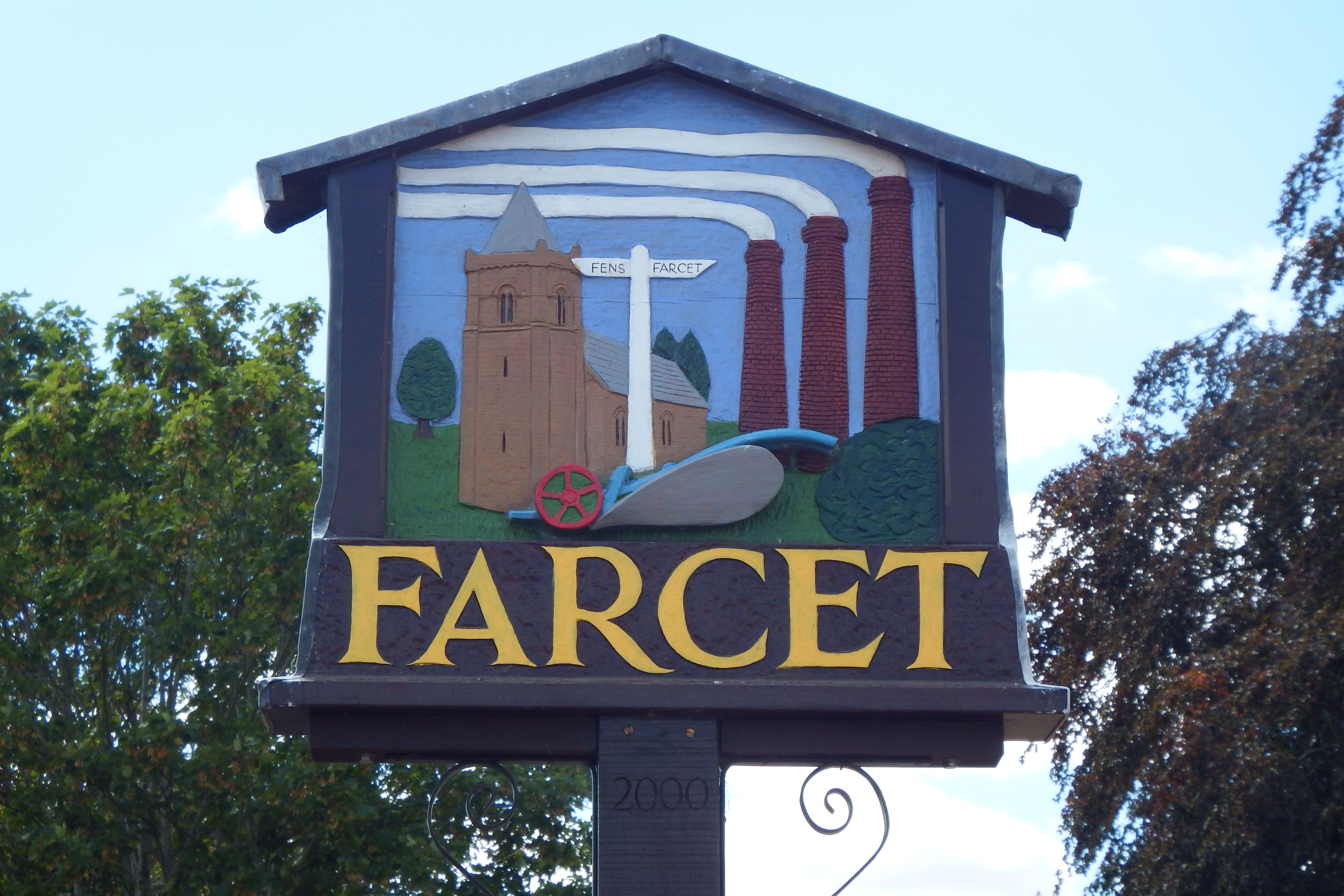
Village sign in Farcet

Farcet (/ˈfæsət/) is a village and civil parish in Cambridgeshire, England. Farcet lies approximately 2 miles (3 km) south of Peterborough city centre, between Yaxley and the Peterborough suburb of Old Fletton. Farcet is situated within Huntingdonshire which is a non-metropolitan district of Cambridgeshire as well as being a historic county of England.

The parish of Farcet was established in 1851, having previously been part of the parish of Stanground, its northern neighbour, when the vicarage of Stanground included the curacy of Farcet's village church.

== Government ==
As a civil parish, Farcet has a parish council. The parish council is elected by the residents of the parish who have registered on the electoral roll; the parish council is the lowest tier of government in England. A parish council is responsible for providing and maintaining a variety of local services including allotments and a cemetery; grass cutting and tree planting within public open spaces such as a village green or playing fields . The parish council reviews all planning applications that might affect the parish and makes recommendations to Huntingdonshire District Council, which is the local planning authority for the parish. The parish council also represents the views of the parish on issues such as local transport, policing and the environment. The parish council raises its own tax to pay for these services, known as the parish precept, which is collected as part of the Council Tax. The parish council consists of nine councillors and has a parish clerk.

Farcet was in the historic and administrative county of Huntingdonshire until 1965. From 1965, the village was part of the new administrative county of Huntingdon and Peterborough. Then in 1974, following the Local Government Act 1972, Farcet became a part of the county of Cambridgeshire.

The second tier of local government is Huntingdonshire District Council which is a non-metropolitan district of Cambridgeshire and has its headquarters in Huntingdon. Huntingdonshire District Council has 52 councillors representing 29 district wards. Huntingdonshire District Council collects the council tax, and provides services such as building regulations, local planning, environmental health, leisure and tourism. Farcet is a part of the district ward of Yaxley and Farcet and is represented on the district council by three councillors. District councillors serve for four-year terms following elections to Huntingdonshire District Council. The current councillors representing Farcet are Liberal Democrat Andrew Wood, alongside Peter Gammons and James Francis of Reform UK, who were elected in 2026.

For Farcet the highest tier of local government is Cambridgeshire County Council which has administration buildings in Cambridge. The county council provides county-wide services such as major road infrastructure, fire and rescue, education, social services, libraries and heritage services. Cambridgeshire County Council consists of 61 councillors representing 59 electoral divisions. Farcet is part of the electoral division of Yaxley and Farcet and is represented on the county council by one councillor. Councillor Mac McGuire of the Conservatives, who previously represented Sawtry from 1985 to 1992, represented Farcet from 1997 until his death was announced in January 2024. Liberal Democrat Andrew Wood was elected councillor in March 2024, before being replaced by Des Watt of Reform UK after the following election. Watt would later switch his party status to independent in August 2025. In January 2026, Watt would briefly join Advance UK, before again becoming an independent in March. Later that August, Watt joined the Conservative Party.

At Westminster Farcet is in the parliamentary constituency of North West Cambridgeshire, and elects one Member of Parliament (MP) by the first past the post system of election. Farcet is represented in the House of Commons by Sam Carling (Labour). The previous members of parliament were Brian Mawhinney (Conservative), who represented the constituency between 1997 and 2005, and Shailesh Vara (Conservative), who represented the constituency from 2005 until 2024.

== Demography ==
=== Population ===
In the period 1801 to 1901 the population of Farcet was recorded every ten years by the UK census. During this time the population was in the range of 363 (the lowest was in 1801) and 1165 (the highest was in 1901).

From 1901, a census was taken every ten years with the exception of 1941 (due to the Second World War).

Parish	1911	1921	1931	1951	1961	1971	1981	1991	2001	2011
Farcet	1284	1243	1304	1268	1236	1192	1189	1194	1647	1867

All population census figures from report Historic Census figures Cambridgeshire to 2011 by Cambridgeshire Insight.

In 2011, the parish covered an area of 4,552 acres (1,842 hectares) and so the population density for Farcet in 2011 was 262.5 persons per square mile (101.4 per square kilometre).

== Religious sites ==
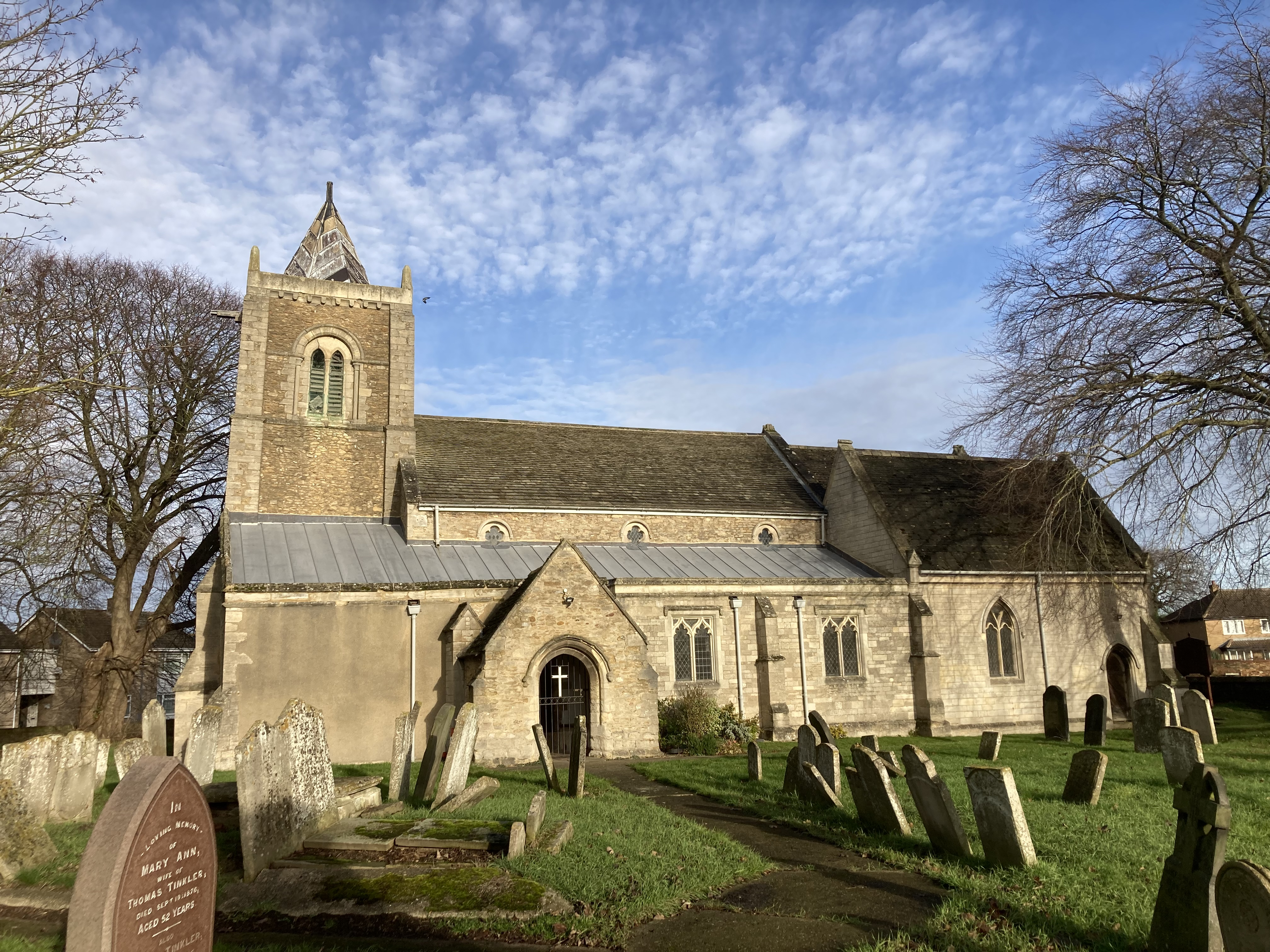
St Mary's church

The church of St. Mary consists of a chancel, south chapel, nave, north aisle, south aisle, west tower and south porch. The walls are of ashlar and rubble with stone dressings, and the roofs are covered with stone slates and lead.

The church is not mentioned in the Domesday survey of 1086, but in the 12th century there was a chancel and an aisleless nave to which a west tower was added in the later years of that century. In the middle of the next century the chancel was rebuilt and a south chapel added. About 1275 the south aisle was added and was continued to the western wall of the tower, possibly with the intention of pulling down the tower and correspondingly lengthen the nave. The south porch was built in the 14th century.

The church was restored in 1852 when the chancel and chapel are said to have been rebuilt, the nave roof renewed and the north aisle added. The tower was restored in 1894–7.

In 2016, the church went through more renovation works because it was not coping in winter weather

== Culture and community ==
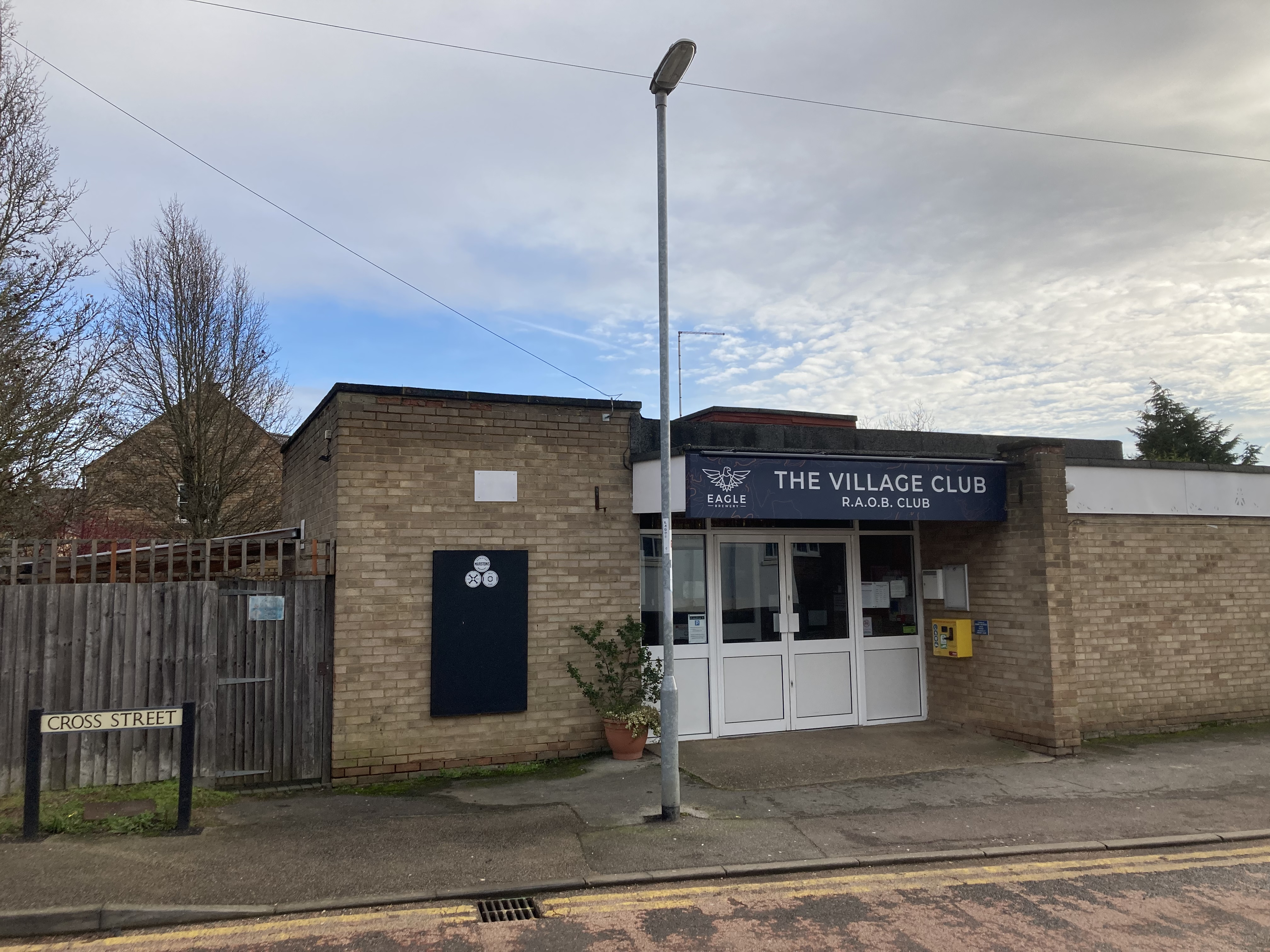
The village club

Farcet has a working men's club called "The Village Club". The old River Nene flows through the area and it can be reached to the Green Wheel cycling and walking network, on the end of St Mary's Street, near the working men's club.

Crown Lakes Country Park is next to the village, the park has a walkway around several lakes as well as a dedicated area for the rare Great Crested Newt, Britain's largest newt.

The Fen View Heritage Centre was opened in 2018 by the Fenland Trust, in the chapel of Farcet cemetery.

== Notable people ==
Lieutenant Walter Henry Goodale (RAF) was born in Farcet in 1894, before moving with his family to Peakirk, Goodale was later killed in action when the DH9 airplane he was piloting was shot down over the Western Front in World War I

Farcet was home to the astronomer George Alcock MBE, one of the most successful visual discoverers of novas and comets, the October 1959 episode of the BBC's The Sky at Night was filmed in his back garden in the village.
