= HR Delphini =

1967 Nova seen in the constellation Delphinus

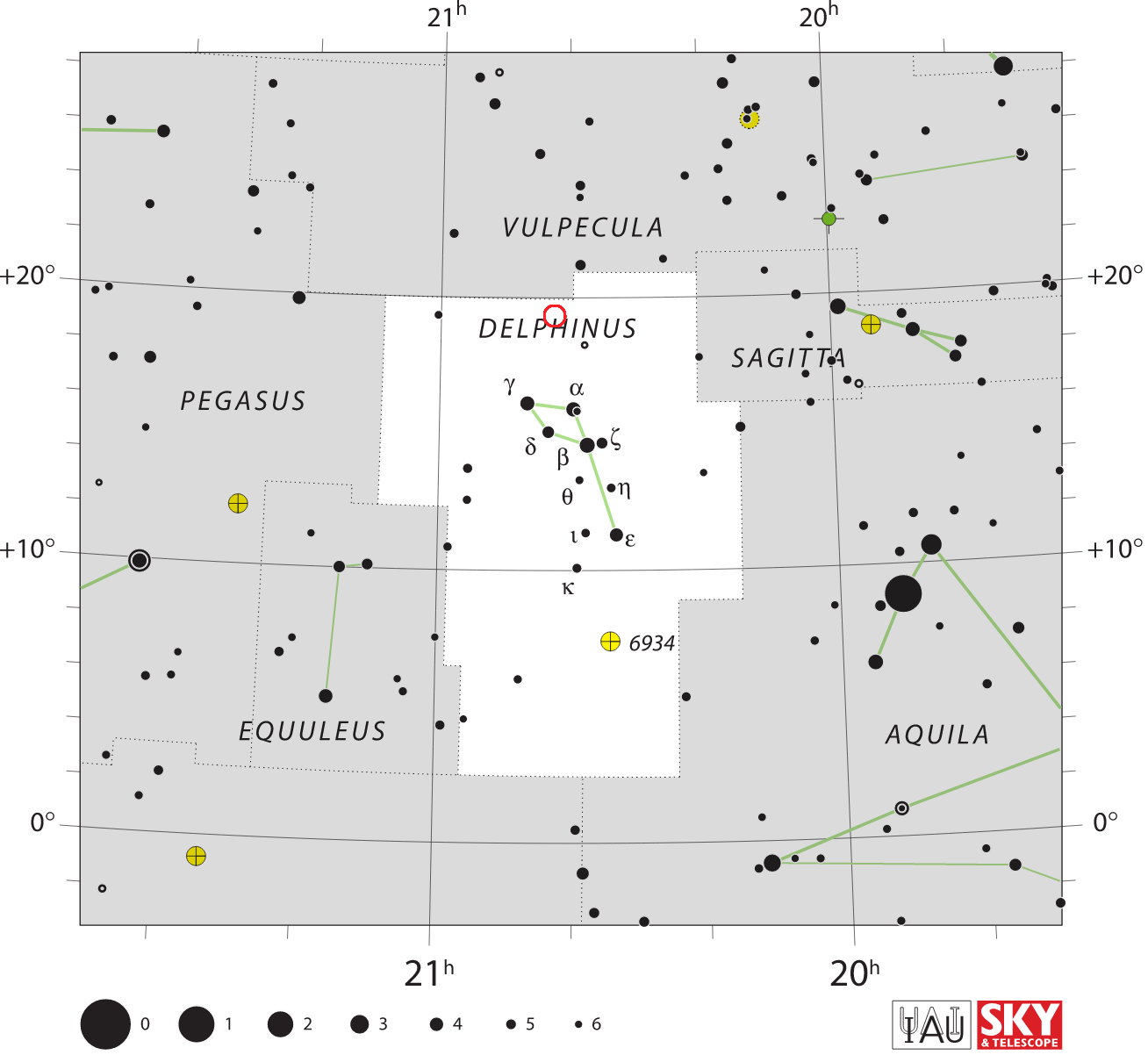
- Location of HR Delphini (circled in red)

Observation data Epoch J2000 Equinox ICRS
- Constellation: Delphinus
- Right ascension: 20^{h} 42^{m} 20.347^{s}
- Declination: +19° 09′ 39.30″
- Apparent magnitude (V): 3.5 – 12.0 (var.)

Characteristics
- Variable type: Classical Nova

Astrometry
| Distance | 932 ± 31 pc |

Other designations
- Nova Delphini 1967, HR Del, AAVSO 2037+18, 2MASS J20422035+1909394. Gaia DR2 1813953083546374144

Database references
| SIMBAD | data |

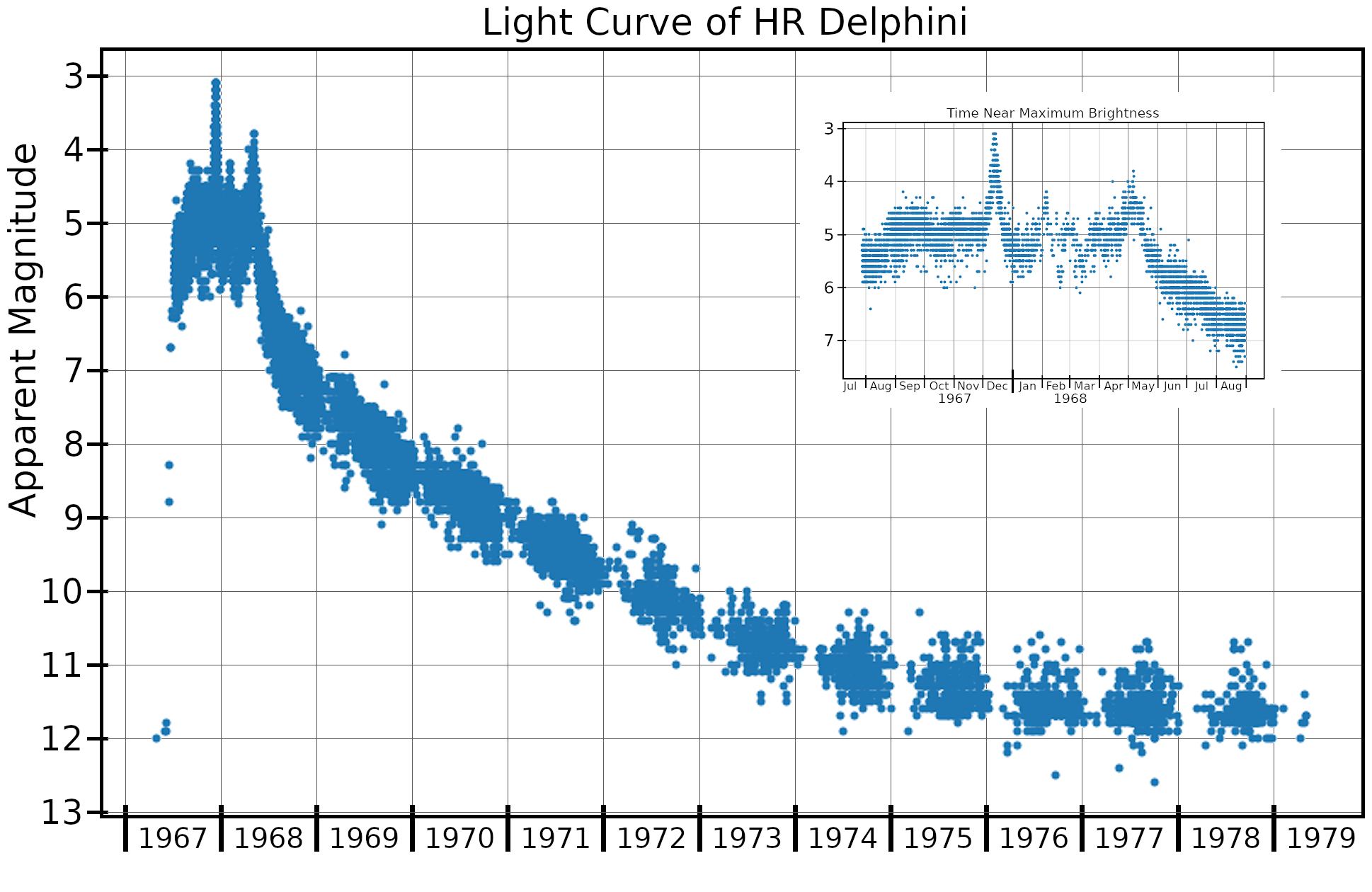
The light curve of HR Delphini, plotted from AAVSO data.

HR Delphini, also known as Nova Delphini 1967, was a nova which appeared in the constellation Delphinus in 1967. It was discovered by George Alcock at 22:35 UT on 8 July 1967, after searching the sky for over 800 hours with binoculars. At the time of discovery it had an apparent magnitude of 5.0. It reached a peak brightness of magnitude 3.5 on 13 December 1967, making it easily visible to the naked eye around that time. Pre-outburst photographs taken with the Samuel Oschin telescope showed it as a ~12th magnitude star which might have been variable.

HR Delphini was discovered 158 days before it reached peak brightness, and its light curve around the peak was very well observed. It had a very slow rise to maximum brightness, when compared to other classical novae. It took 230 days for HR Delphini to fade from its peak by 3 magnitudes, which makes it a "slow" nova. Its decline from peak brightness showed several brief outbursts, leading to its light curve being classified as type "J" (for "jitters").

In June 1970, HR Delphini was detected in 3.7 cm and 11.1 cm radio wavelengths with the Green Bank Interferometer, and at 1.95 cm with the Green Bank 140 foot telescope.

All novae are binary stars, with a "donor" star orbiting a white dwarf. The two stars are so close to each other that material is transferred from the donor to the white dwarf. In the case of HR Delphini, the orbital period of the binary pair is 5.14 hours. The mass of the white dwarf is estimated to be between 0.6 and 0.75 M_{☉} and the donor star is believed to be a main sequence star with a mass between 0.52 and 0.58 M_{☉} with a spectral type in the range of K5V to M1V.

HR Delphini is surrounded by a bipolar nova remnant emission nebula, visible in Hα, Hβ as well as forbidden lines of oxygen and nitrogen. It is roughly ellipsoidal, with a central ring around the equatorial region. It had a size of 3.7 × 2.5 arc seconds when it was discovered in 1981, and had expanded to roughly 8.5 × 6.1 arc seconds when it was observed with the Hubble Space Telescope in 1997.
