= V476 Cygni =

Star in the constellation Cygnus

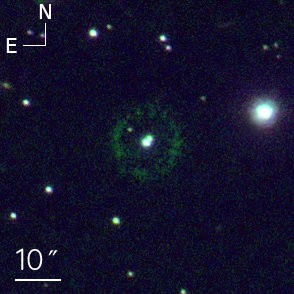
- RGB composite color image of the shell surrounding the nova V476 Cygni, made from three narrow band images: Blue = 4800Å, green = Hα at 6563 Å and red = [NII] at 6583 Å. From Santamaria et al. 2020

Observation data Epoch J2000.0 Equinox ICRS
- Constellation: Cygnus
- Right ascension: 19^{h} 58^{m} 24.46^{s}
- Declination: +53° 37′ 07.5″
- Apparent magnitude (V): 1.7Max. 17.09Min.

Astrometry
Distance	665+107 −53 pc

Characteristics
- Variable type: Nova

Other designations
- V476 Cyg, Nova Cygni 1920, GCRV 12334, AAVSO 1955+53B

Database references
SIMBAD	data

V476 Cygni or Nova Cygni 1920 was a nova which occurred in the constellation Cygnus in 1920. It was discovered by William Frederick Denning, an English amateur astronomer, at 09:30 GMT on 20 August 1920, at which time it had a magnitude of 3.7. It reached a peak brightness of magnitude 1.7 on 23 August 1920. Its quiescent brightness is magnitude 17.09.

V476 Cygni's light curve is quite unusual, showing a rapid decline from maximum brightness, followed by a slow nearly linear fading. It is classified as a very fast nova, with a very long tail. The light curve shows a "dust dip", a fast decline to a local brightness minimum, then a small increase in brightness, and finally a long, slow decline. This dust dip is believed to coincide with the formation of dust in the material ejected from the nova as it moves away from the star and cools.

All novae consist of a close binary star pair, with a white dwarf star and a "donor" star orbiting each other. The stars are so close together that the less dense donor star transfers matter to the white dwarf. In the case of V476 Cygni, modeling indicates that the white dwarf has a mass of 1.18M_{☉}, and it is receiving 6×10^{−10} M_{☉} of material from the donor star, per year. V476 Cygni has transitioned into a recurrent dwarf nova, although it has done so much earlier than expected.

A small emission nebula (shell) is visible around the star, which resembles a planetary nebula. Santamaria et al. examined images of the nebula taken in 1944, 1993 and 2018 and found that the shell is clearly expanding. It is slightly elliptical, with major and minor axes of 14.6×13.4 arc seconds (as of 2018) expanding at a rate of 0.073×0.067 arc seconds per year, implying a physical expansion rate of 230×200 km/sec. Surprisingly, a 1997 attempt to image the shell using the Hubble Space Telescope, was unsuccessful.

== Gallery ==
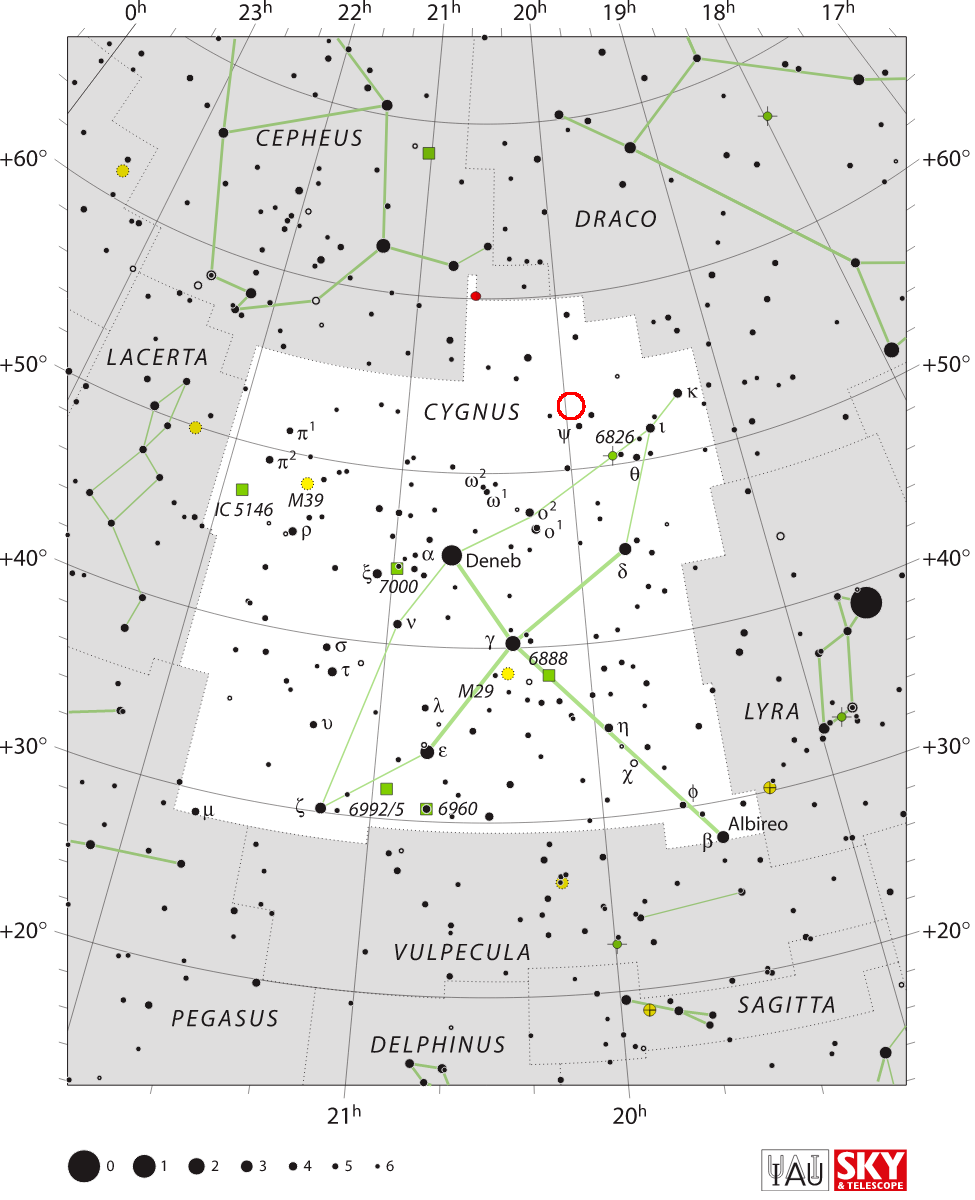
The location of V476 Cygni (circled in red)

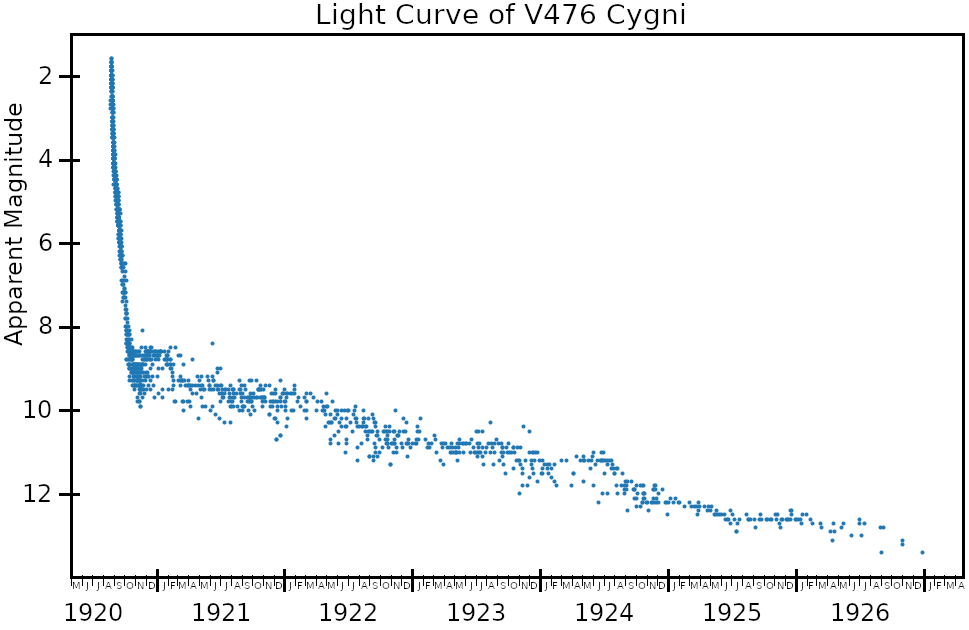
The light curve of V476 Cygni, plotted from AAVSO data
