= C/1959 Q2 (Alcock) =

Parabolic comet

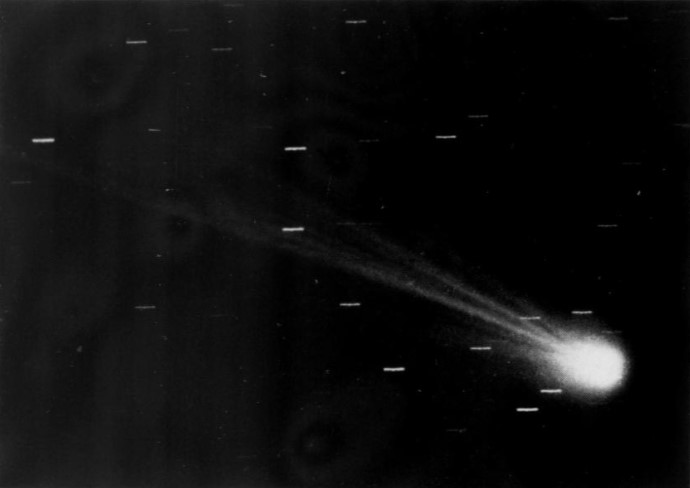
- Comet Alcock imaged by Elizabeth Roemer from the US Naval Observatory on 1 September 1959.

Discovery
- Discovered by: George E. D. Alcock
- Discovery site: Peterborough, England
- Discovery date: 30 August 1959

Designations
- Alternative designations: 1959 VI, 1959f

Orbital characteristics
- Epoch: 4 September 1959 (JD 2436815.5)
- Observation arc: 5 days
- Number of observations: 14
- Perihelion: 0.166 AU
- Eccentricity: 1.00043
- Inclination: 108.04°
- Longitude of ascending node: 225.84°
- Argument of periapsis: 300.54°
- Mean anomaly: –0.002°
- Last perihelion: 15 September 1959
- Earth MOID: 0.161 AU
- Jupiter MOID: 2.839 AU

Physical characteristics
- Comet nuclear magnitude (M2): 8.1–11.0
- Apparent magnitude: 4.7 (1959 apparition)

Comet Alcock, formally designated as C/1959 Q2, is a relatively bright non-periodic comet that only appeared for a week in September 1959. It was the second comet discovered by English astronomer George Alcock.

== Observational history ==
Shortly after discovering C/1959 Q1 George Alcock found his second comet using a pair of binoculars on the night of 30 August 1959. He described the new comet as a diffuse, sixth-magnitude object with a central condensation and a small tail, located within the constellation Cancer. (Note: Reported initial position upon discovery was: α = 8^{h} 09.5^{m} , δ = 17° 31′)

Elizabeth Roemer took long-exposure photographs of the comet from the US Naval Observatory on 1 September 1959, reporting a sharply-condensed nucleus and a tail over a degree in length. By the following day, Alois Purgathofer, George van Biesbroeck, and D. P. Elias also observed the comet, where it was reported that the comet had slightly brightened to 5.7 in apparent magnitude. On 4 September it brightened further to magnitude 4.7.

The comet was last seen by Roemer on 6 September 1959 within the constellation Hydra, (Note: Last known positions upon final observation were: α = 9^{h} 29.9^{m} , δ = 5° 05′) shortly before an expected solar conjunction the following day.
