= Green Wheel =

Cycling and pedestrian network in Peterborough, England

Coordinates: 52°35′N 0°15′W

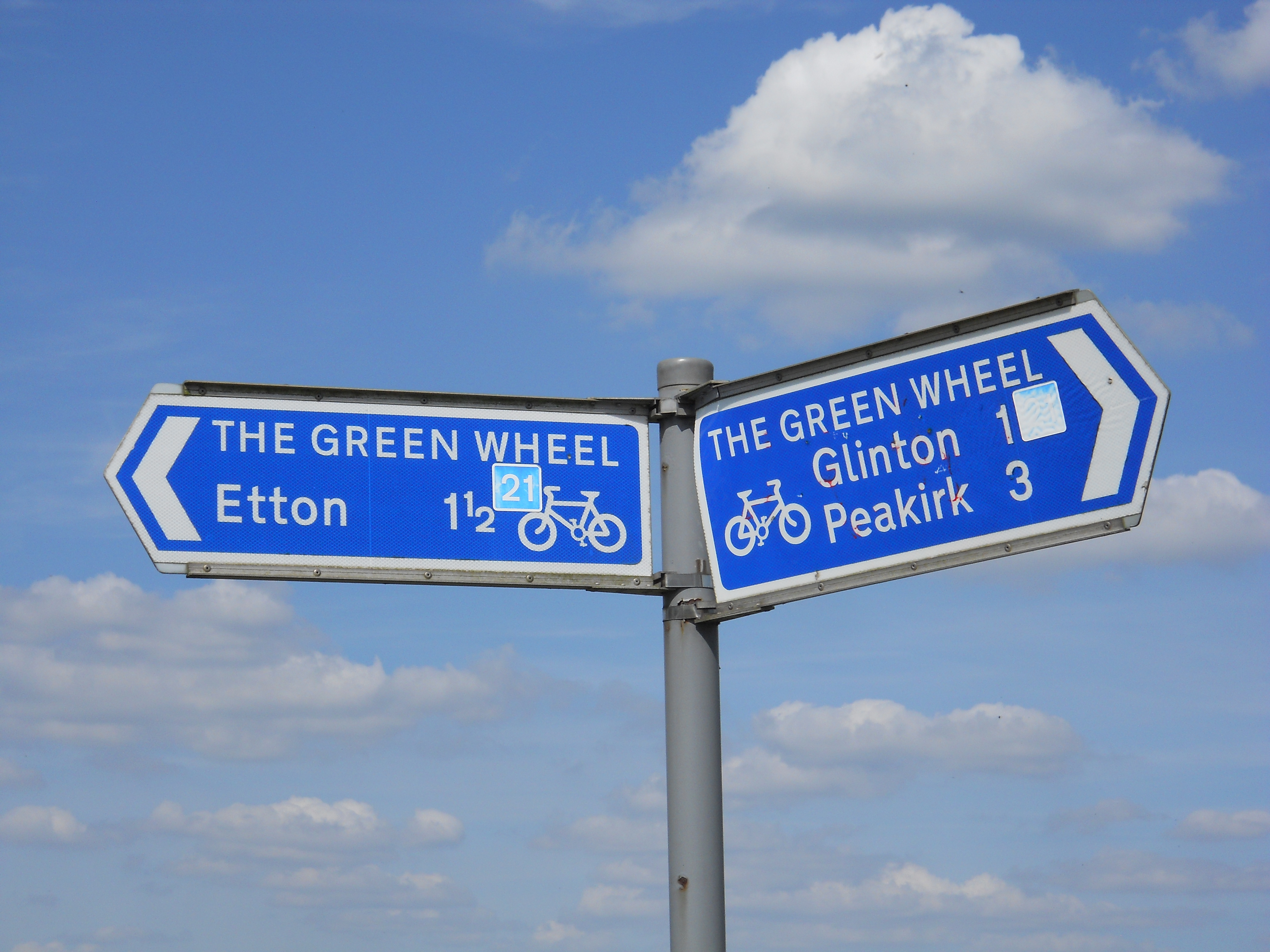
Green Wheel signpost

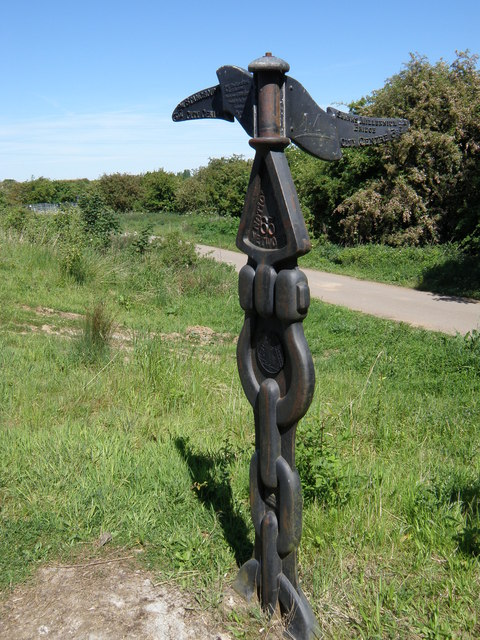
Mile post on the Green Wheel

The Green Wheel is an 80-kilometre (50 mi) network of cycleways, footpaths, and bridleways in Peterborough, England. Designed as part of a sustainable transport system for the city, it was created as a project by the Millennium Commission.

The name Green Wheel alludes to the circular nature of the major part of the path, which encircles Peterborough, with cycle route "spokes" leading from this perimeter, which passes through several peripheral settlements around Peterborough, into the city centre, allowing easy transport around the network, much of which required no new construction, instead using or improving already existing cycle routes or roads. The only major new construction for the project was a curved cycle bridge over the River Nene near Whittlesey, from where the path can be accessed northwards towards Flag Fen, into the city centre, or southwards towards the Ortons. The network is fully signposted. Additionally, three circular pipe tunnels were constructed near Etton village to allow the Green Wheel route to pass underneath the A15.

The project also encourages recreational use and has created a sculpture trail, which provides functional, landscape artworks along the Green Wheel route and a ‘Living Landmarks’ project involving the local community in the creation of local landscape features such as mini woodlands, ponds and hedgerows.

The project cost £11 million and was 50% funded by the National Lottery through the Millennium Commission and has also won many awards, including a RIBA award for Architecture in 2003.

== See also ==
- National Cycle Network
