= C/1963 F1 (Alcock) =

Non-periodic comet

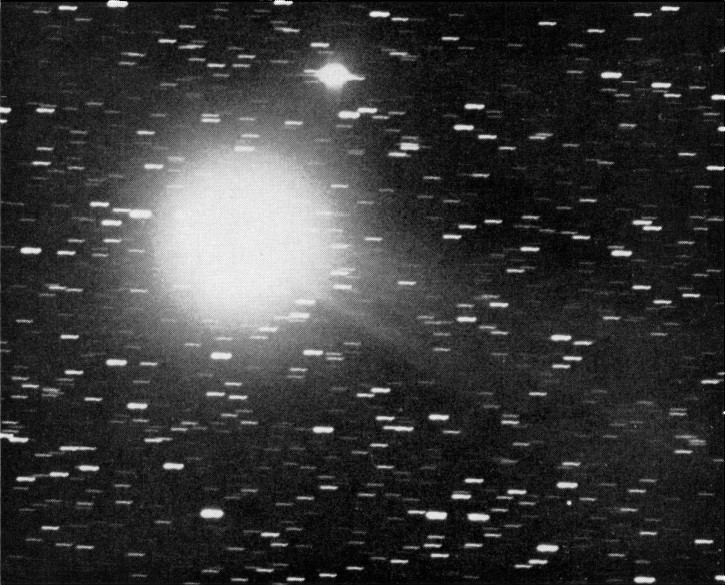
- Comet Alcock photographed from the US Naval Observatory on 21 March 1963.

Discovery
- Discovered by: George E. D. Alcock
- Discovery site: Peterborough, England
- Discovery date: 19 March 1963

Designations
- Alternative designations: 1963 III, 1963b

Orbital characteristics
- Epoch: 15 May 1963 (JD 2438164.5)
- Observation arc: 118 days
- Number of observations: 101
- Aphelion: 1,476 AU
- Perihelion: 1.537 AU
- Semi-major axis: 738.8 AU
- Eccentricity: 0.99738
- Orbital period: ~14,200 years
- Inclination: 86.219°
- Longitude of ascending node: 43.465°
- Argument of periapsis: 146.62°
- Last perihelion: 5 May 1963
- T_{Jupiter}: 0.108
- Earth MOID: 0.632 AU
- Jupiter MOID: 2.855 AU

Physical characteristics
- Comet total magnitude (M1): 6.6
- Comet nuclear magnitude (M2): 13.9
- Apparent magnitude: 4.4 (1963 apparition)

Comet Alcock, formally designated as C/1963 F1 is a non-periodic comet that became barely visible to the naked eye in May 1963. It is the third of five comets discovered by English astronomer, George Alcock.

== Discovery and observations ==
George Alcock found a new comet using his 25 × 105 binoculars on the morning of 19 March 1963. It was a diffuse 8th-magnitude object with a short tail about 2° northwest of the star δ Cyg at the time of discovery. (Note: Reported initial position upon discovery was: α = 19^{h} 33.7^{m} , δ = 48° 34′) The comet was further observed in the following days, including a photographic session done from the Flagstaff Observatory. By the end of April it had steadily brightened up to 7.5 in apparent magnitude.

It had reached perihelion on 5 May, and made its closest approach to Earth about four days later. Initially, its brightness remained slightly lower than predicted by its ephemerides, until it produced an outburst that significantly raised its peak magnitude from 5.8 to 4.4 on 30 May. The nucleus was then observed to split into two, later five pieces on 23 June following several subsequent outbursts that started about a week earlier. By 19 July, John C. Bennett reported that the comet faded back as a 9th-magnitude object, noting its coma being slightly elongated. It was last observed on August 1963.

During the outbursts, significant amounts of CN, C_{2} and C_{3} were detected, ejecting 2.19×10^{8} kg of dust into space.
