= George Alcock =

English amateur astronomer (1912–2000)

George Alcock MBE FRAS FRGS FRMetS
- Born: George Eric Deacon Alcock; 28 August 1912; Peterborough, Northamptonshire, England
- Died: 15 December 2000 (aged 88); Farcet, Cambridgeshire, England
- Known for: Discovery of comets and novae
- Spouse: Mary Green (m. 1941; died 1991)

George Eric Deacon Alcock (28 August 1912 – 15 December 2000) was an English amateur astronomer. He was one of the most successful visual discoverers of novae and comets.

Born in Peterborough, Northamptonshire, the son of a railway worker, George’s interest in astronomy was sparked by his first encounter with the solar eclipse of 8 April 1921. His interest evolved into the observation of meteors and meteor showers, resulting to him joining the Meteor Section of the British Astronomical Association on 27 March 1935, while training to be a teacher. He balanced his pursuit of astronomy with his full-time teaching career, moving between temporary posts before obtaining a permanent position in 1937. While serving in the Royal Air Force during World War II, he saw action in North Africa and Italy, and was court-martialed three times. In 1953, he started his search for comets and in 1955 for novae. His technique involved memorization of the patterns of thousands of stars, so that he would visually recognize any intruder.

In 1959, he discovered comet C/1959 Q1 — the first comet discovered in Britain since 1894. After five days, he discovered another, named C/1959 Q2. He discovered two more comets in 1963 (C/1963 F1) and 1965 (C/1965 S2). His first Nova was Delphini 1967 (HR Delphini), which turned out to have an unusual light-curve. He discovered two more novae, LV Vul (in 1968) and V368 Sct (in 1970). He found his fifth and final comet in 1983: C/1983 H1 (IRAS-Araki-Alcock). In 1991 he found the nova V838 Her.

== Honours and awards ==
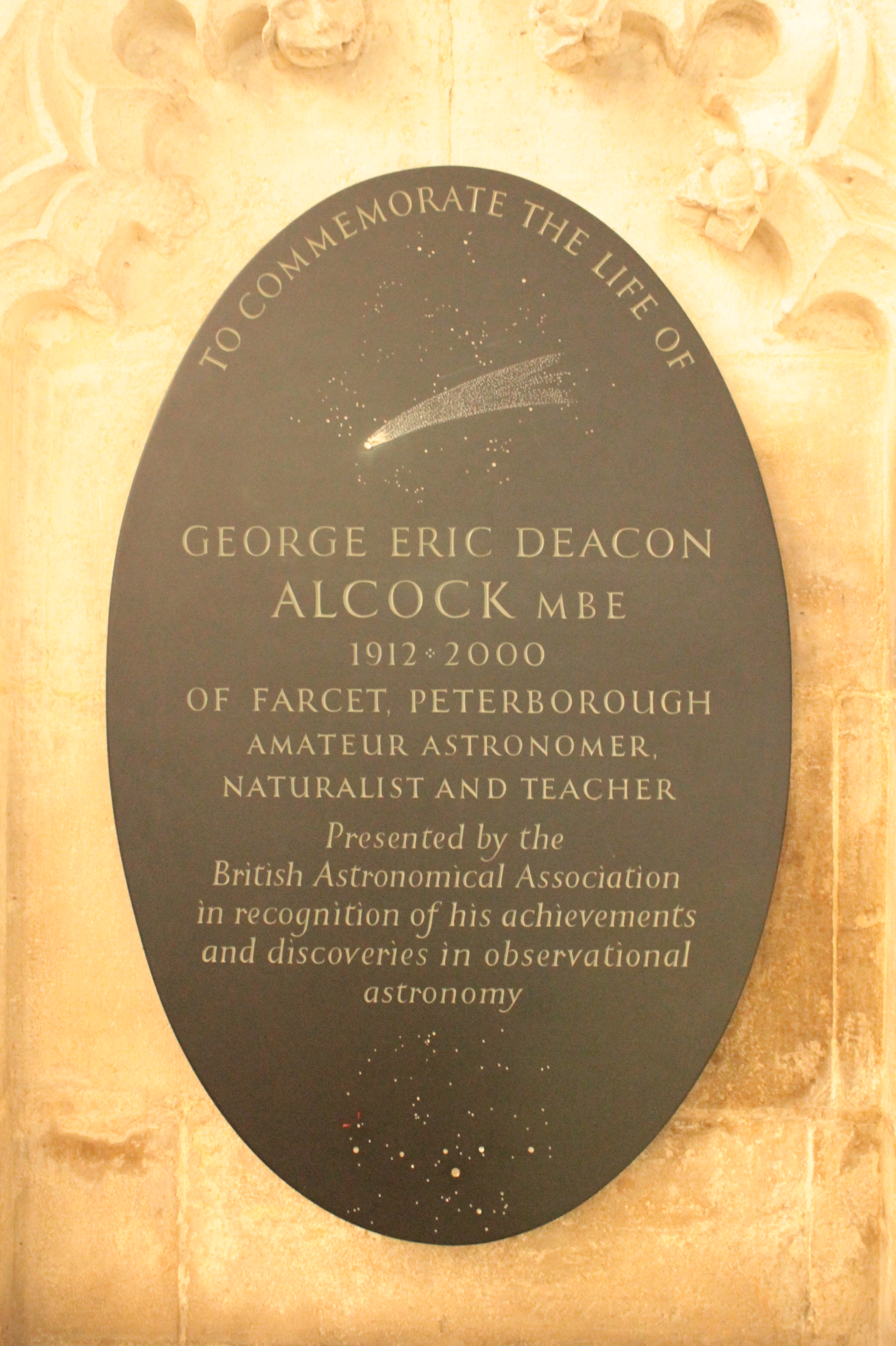
Plaque to George Alcock, Peterborough Cathedral

Alcock became a Fellow of three British societies in 1947 — the Royal Astronomical Society, the Royal Geographical Society, and the Royal Meteorological Society. He won the Jackson-Gwilt Medal of the Royal Astronomical Society in 1963. On 7 February 1979, Queen Elizabeth II conferred on him an MBE. In 1981, he received the International Amateur Achievement Award from the Astronomical Society of the Pacific.

Asteroid 3174 Alcock is named after him.

Outside of astronomy, he maintained a multitude of other active interests, notably in meteorology (the study of weather, unrelated to his interest in meteors)., natural history (specifically ornithology and botany), and church architecture.

In 1996, Genesis Publications published a limited edition signed biography, authored by Kay Williams, entitled "Under An English Heaven - The Life of George Alcock".

After his death, a plaque was placed in Peterborough Cathedral in his memory.

== Personal life ==
In 1936, Alcock met Mary Green through their shared interest in astronomy. They were married on 7 June 1941, and moved to the village of Farcet from 1955, in a house they called Antares, where Alcock discovered five comets and five nova. Mary died on 25 October 1991. The couple had no children.

Preceded by Frank Bateson	Amateur Achievement Award of Astronomical Society of the Pacific; 1981	Succeeded by Ben Mayer
