= Nova remnant =

Cosmic matter (remnant)

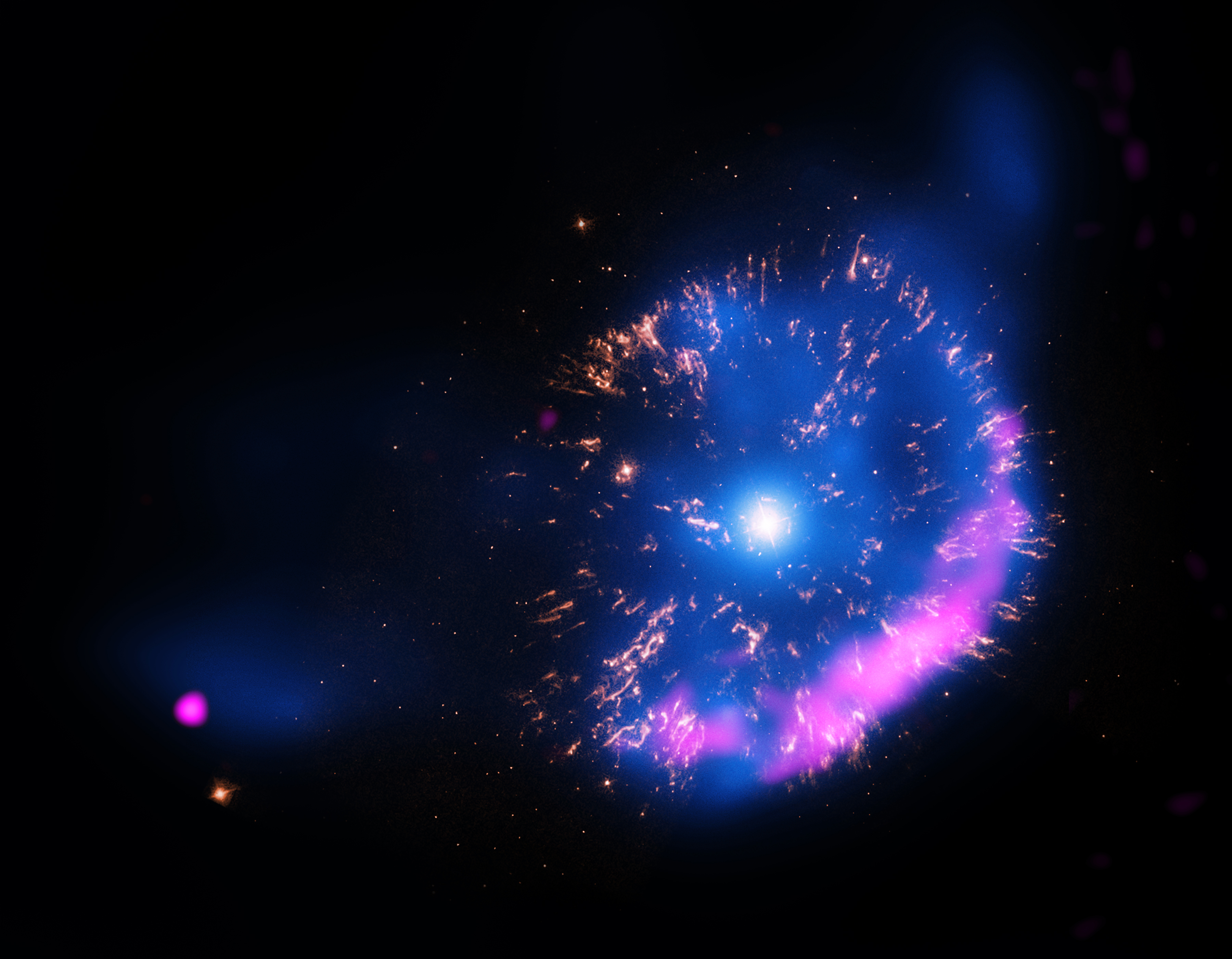
GK Persei: Nova of 1901 – remnant

A nova remnant is made up of the material either left behind by a sudden explosive fusion eruption by classical novae, or from multiple ejections by recurrent novae. Over their short lifetimes, nova shells show expansion velocities of around 1000 km/s, whose faint nebulosities are usually illuminated by their progenitor stars via light echoes as observed with the spherical shell of Nova Persei 1901 or the energies remaining in the expanding bubbles like T Pyxidis.

== Form ==
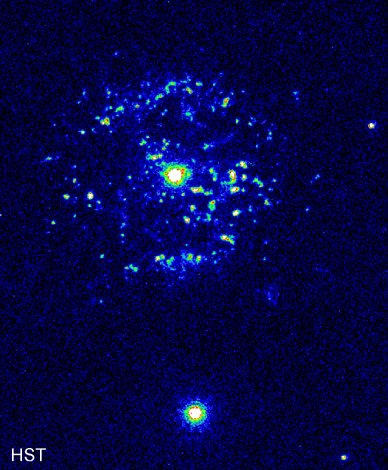
Nova T Pyxidis – remnant

Most novae require a close binary system, with a white dwarf and a main sequence, sub-giant, or red giant star, or the merging of two red dwarfs, so probably all nova remnants must be associated with binaries. This theoretically means these nebula shapes might be affected by their central progenitor stars and the amount of matter ejected by novae. The shapes of these nova nebulae are of much interest to modern astrophysicists.

Nova remnants when compared to supernova remnants or planetary nebulae generate much less both in energy and mass. They can be observed for perhaps a few centuries. Notably, more nova remnants have been found with the new novae, due to improved imaging technology like CCD and at other wavelengths. Examples of novae displaying nebula shells or remnants include the following:

- GK Per
- RR Pic
- DQ Her
- FH Ser
- V476 Cyg
- V1974 Cyg
- HR Del
- V1500 Cyg

== See also ==
- Planetary nebula
- Supernova remnant
