= List of astronomers =

The following is a list of astronomers, astrophysicists and other notable people who have made contributions to the field of astronomy. They may have won major prizes or awards, developed or invented widely used techniques or technologies within astronomy, or are directors of major observatories or heads of space-based telescope projects.

== Notable astronomers ==
Name	Country	Born	Died	Notable for
Marc Aaronson	United States	1950	1987	His work concentrated on three fields: the determination of the Hubble constant (H_{0}) using the Tully–Fisher relation, the study of carbon rich stars, and the velocity distribution of those stars in dwarf spheroidal galaxies. Aaronson was one of the first astronomers to attempt to image dark matter using infrared imaging. He imaged infrared halos of unknown matter around galaxies that could be dark matter.
Hiroshi Abe	Japan	1958		
George Ogden Abell	United States	1927	1983	
Antonio Abetti	Italy	1847	1928	Abetti mainly worked in positional astronomy and made many observations of minor planets, comets, and star occultations. He computed the orbit of 170 Maria, a Main belt asteroid.
Giorgio Abetti	Italy	1882	1982	
Charles Greeley Abbot	United States	1872	1973	
Charles Hitchcock Adams	United States	1868	1951	
John Couch Adams	United Kingdom	1819	1892	His most famous achievement was predicting the existence and position of Neptune, using only mathematics. The calculations were made to explain discrepancies with Uranus's orbit and the laws of Kepler and Newton.
Walter Sydney Adams	United States	1876	1956	He is renowned for his pioneering work in spectroscopy.
Saul Adelman	United States	1944		
Petrus Alphonsi	Spain	1062	1110	
Agrippa	Greece	fl. c. 92 CE		Agrippa observed the occultation of a part of the Pleiades by the southernmost part of the Moon.
Paul Oswald Ahnert	Germany	1897	1989	
Eva Ahnert-Rohlfs	Germany	1912	1954	She made key observations of variable stars.
George Biddell Airy	United Kingdom	1801	1892	Measured the mean density of the Earth, a method of solution of two-dimensional problems in solid mechanics and, in his role as Astronomer Royal, played a role in establishing Greenwich as the location of the prime meridian.
Robert Aitken	United States	1864	1951	
Makio Akiyama	Japan	1950		
Abd Al-Rahman Al Sufi	Persia	903	986	Al-Ṣūfī was a major contributor to the translation into Arabic of the Hellenistic astronomy that had been centered in Alexandria, Egypt.
Albategnius (see Al-Batani)	Syria	c. 858	929	Al-Battānī's observations of the Sun led him to understand the nature of annular solar eclipses. He accurately calculated the Earth's obliquity (the angle between the planes of the equator and the ecliptic)
Vladimir Aleksandrovich Albitzky	Russia	1891	1952	
Albumasar	Persia	787	886	While he was not a major innovator, his practical manuals for training astrologers profoundly influenced Muslim intellectual history and, through translations, that of western Europe and Byzantium.
George Alcock	United Kingdom	1913	2000	Discovered comets C/1959 Q1, C/1959 Q2, C/1963 F1 and C/1965 S2.
Harold Alden	United States	1890	1964	
Hannes Alfvén	Sweden	1908	1995	
Lawrence H. Aller	United States	1913	2003	
Viktor Amazaspovich Ambartsumian	Armenia	1912	1996	One of the 20th century's top astronomers, he is widely regarded as the founder of theoretical astrophysics in the Soviet Union.
John August Anderson	United States	1876	1959	made significant contributions to improving astronomical instruments in the early 20th century, especially diffraction gratings.
Wilhelm Anderson	Estonia	1880	1940	Best known for his work on the mass limit for a white dwarf
Marie Henri Andoyer	France	1862	1929	
Andronicus of Cyrrhus	Greece	fl. c. 100 BC		
Anders Jonas Ångström	Sweden	1814	1874	
Eugène Michel Antoniadi	Greece/France	1870	1944	He made the first map of Mercury (although his maps were flawed due to incorrectly assuming that Mercury had synchronous rotation with the Sun)
Masakatsu Aoki	Japan	1957		
Petrus Apianus	Germany	1495	1557	
François Arago	France	1786	1853	
Masaru Arai	Japan	1952		
Hiroshi Araki	Japan			
Sylvain Arend	Belgium	1902	1992	
Friedrich Wilhelm Argelander	Germany	1799	1875	
Felicitas Arias	Argentina	1952		
Aristarchus of Samos	Greece	c. 310 BC	c. 230 BC	He presented the first known heliocentric model that placed the Sun at the center of the known universe, with the Earth revolving around the Sun once a year and rotating about its axis once a day.
Christoph Arnold	Germany	1650	1695	
Halton Christian Arp	United States	1927	2013	
Aryabhata	India	476	550	Aryabhata correctly insisted that the Earth rotates about its axis daily, and that the apparent movement of the stars is a relative motion caused by the rotation of the Earth. Solar and lunar eclipses were scientifically explained by Aryabhata. Aryabhata calculated the sidereal rotation (the rotation of the Earth referencing the fixed stars).
Arzachel	Spain	1028	1087	
Asada Goryu	Japan	1734	1799	
Giuseppe Asclepi	Italy	1706	1776	
Joseph Ashbrook	United States	1918	1980	
Arthur Auwers	Germany	1838	1915	
Adrien Auzout	France	1622	1691	
David Axon	England	1951	2012	
Walter Baade	Germany	1893	1960	
Harold D. Babcock	United States	1882	1968	He specialized in solar spectroscopy and precisely mapped the distribution of magnetic fields over the Sun's surface.
Horace W. Babcock	United States	1912	2003	In 1953 he was the first to propose the idea of adaptive optics, a technique of precisely deforming a mirror in order to compensate for light distortion.
Oskar Backlund	Sweden	1846	1916	
John N. Bahcall	United States	1934	2005	
Yoshiaki Banno	Japan	1952	1991	
Benjamin Baillaud	France	1848	1934	He specialized in celestial mechanics, in particular the motions of the satellites of Saturn.
Jules Baillaud	France	1876	1960	
Jean-Baptiste Baille	France	1841	1918	
Jean Sylvain Bailly	France	1736	1793	
Francis Baily	United Kingdom	1774	1844	He is most famous for his observations of "Baily's beads" during a total eclipse of the Sun.
John Bainbridge	United Kingdom	1582	1643	
John E. Baldwin	United Kingdom	1931	2010	He played a role in the development of interferometry in Radio Astronomy, and later astronomical optical interferometry and lucky imaging.
Sallie Baliunas	United States	1953		
Zoltán Balog	Hungary/United States	1972		Balog's team was the first to observe the complete process of photoevaporation of a protoplanetary disk.
Benjamin Banneker	United States	1731	1806	
Pietro Baracchi	Italy/Australia	1851	1926	
Beatriz Barbuy	Brazil	1950		
Edward Emerson Barnard	United States	1857	1923	He is best known for his discovery of the high proper motion of Barnard's Star in 1916, which is named in his honor
Al Battani	Iraq	850	929	Al-Battānī's observations of the Sun led him to understand the nature of annular solar eclipses. He accurately calculated the Earth's obliquity (the angle between the planes of the equator and the ecliptic), the solar year, and the equinoxes (obtaining a value for the precession of the equinoxes of one degree in 66 years). The accuracy of his data encouraged Nicolaus Copernicus to pursue ideas about the heliocentric nature of the cosmos.
Stefi Baum	United States	1958		Baum helped to develop the Hubble Space Telescope
Julius Bauschinger	Germany	1860	1934	
Johann Bayer	Germany	1572	1625	His atlas was the first to cover the entire celestial sphere.
Antonín Bečvář	Czechoslovakia	1901	1965	
Wilhelm Beer	Germany	1797	1850	Together with Johann Heinrich Mädler, he produced the first exact map of the Moon and of Mars
Eric F. Bell	United States			
Sergei Ivanovich Belyavsky	Russia	1883	1953	
Charles L. Bennett	United States	1956		
Bhaskara I	India	600	680	
Bhaskara II	India	1114	1185	
Friedrich Wilhelm Bessel	Germany	1784	1846	The first to successfully calculate the distance to a star other than the Sun
Somnath Bharadwaj	India	1964		
Wolf Bickel	Germany	1942		
Wilhelm Freiherr von Biela	Austria	1782	1856	
Ludwig Biermann	Germany	1907	1986	Discovering the Biermann battery, a process by which a weak seed magnetic field can be generated from zero initial conditions. He predicted the existence of the solar wind which in 1947 he dubbed "solar corpuscular radiation"
Guillaume Bigourdan	France	1851	1932	
James Binney	United Kingdom	1950		
Al-Biruni	Khwarezm/Persia	973	1048	
Gennady S. Bisnovatyi-Kogan	Russia	1941		He is known for predicting binary radio pulsars.
Adriaan Blaauw	Netherlands	1914	2010	Blaauw was closely involved in the founding of the European Southern Observatory, and was its general director from 1970 to 1975. From 1976 to 1979, he served as president of the International Astronomical Union.
Nathaniel Bliss	United Kingdom	1700	1764	
Johann Elert Bode	Germany	1747	1826	He was director of the Berlin Observatory from 1786 to 1825. There he published the Uranographia in 1801, a celestial atlas
Alfred Bohrmann	Germany	1904	2000	
Bart Bok	Netherlands	1906	1983	The discovery of Bok globules, which are small, densely dark clouds of interstellar gas and dust that can be seen silhouetted against brighter backgrounds.
Charles Thomas Bolton	United States/Canada	1943	2021	Was one of the first to present strong evidence of the existence of a stellar-mass black hole
John Gatenby Bolton	United Kingdom/Australia	1922	1993	Bolton was integral in establishing that discrete radio sources were either galaxies or the remnants of supernovae, rather than stars. He also played a significant role in the discovery of quasars and the centre of the Milky Way.
William Cranch Bond	United States	1789	1859	The first director of Harvard College Observatory.
Thomas Bopp	United States	1949	2018	In 1995, he discovered Comet Hale–Bopp.
Alphonse Borrelly	France	1842	1926	
Rudjer Boscovich	Croatia	1711	1787	
Lewis Boss	United States	1846	1912	
Alexis Bouvard	France	1767	1843	Bouvard hypothesised the existence of an eighth planet responsible for the irregularities in Uranus' orbit. The position of Neptune was subsequently calculated from Bouvard's observations by Urbain Le Verrier after his death.
Rychard Bouwens	United States	1972		
Edward L. G. Bowell	United States	1943		
Ira Sprague Bowen	United States	1898	1973	In 1927 he discovered that nebulium was not really a chemical element but instead doubly ionized oxygen.
Louis Boyer	France	1901	1999	
Brian J. Boyle	United Kingdom/Australia	1960		
Ronald N. Bracewell	Australia/United States	1921	2007	
James Bradley	United Kingdom	1693	1762	He is best known for two fundamental discoveries in astronomy, the aberration of light (1725–1728), and the nutation of the Earth's axis (1728–1748).
William A. Bradfield	New Zealand/Australia	1927	2014	
Tycho Brahe	Denmark	1546	1601	Tycho Brahe was the first to discover a super nova, which he falsely believed was a newly created star (in reality a dying star), which was one of the major reasons to abandon the view that the universe was static and eternal.
Brahmagupta	India	598	668 CE	
John Alfred Brashear	United States	1840	1920	
William Robert Brooks	United States	1844	1922	
Theodor Brorsen	Denmark	1819	1895	He is best known for his discovery of five comets, including the lost periodic comet, 5D/Brorsen
Dirk Brouwer	Netherlands/United States	1902	1966	
Ernest William Brown	United Kingdom	1866	1938	His life's work was the study of the Moon's motion (lunar theory) and the compilation of extremely accurate lunar tables.
Michael (Mike) E. Brown	United States	1965		Co-discoverer of multiple dwarf planets beyond Pluto, including Quaoar in 2002, Makemake in 2005 and Eris in 2006. This triggered a debate on the definition of a planet.
Hermann Alexander Brück	Germany	1905	2000	
Paul Brück	France	1856	1922	
Ismael Bullialdus	France	1605	1694	
Margaret Burbidge	United Kingdom/United States	1919	2020	
Miriam Burland	Canada	1902	1996	
Jocelyn Bell Burnell	United Kingdom	1943		Discovered the first radio pulsars, highly magnetized rotating neutron stars, in 1967.
Robert Burnham Jr.	United States	1931	1993	
Sherburne Wesley Burnham	United States	1838	1921	
Schelte J. Bus	United States	1956		
Bimla Buti	India	1933		
Daniela Calzetti	United States/Italy			Formulated the Calzetti law, a description dust attenuation in starburst galaxies.
Alastair G. W. Cameron	Canada	1925	2005	He was one of the founders of the field of nuclear astrophysics, advanced the theory that the Moon was created by the giant impact of a Mars-sized object with the early Earth, and was an early adopter of computer technology in astrophysics.
William Wallace Campbell	United States	1862	1938	
Annie Jump Cannon	United States	1863	1941	
Luigi Carnera	Italy	1875	1962	
Edwin Francis Carpenter	United States	1898	1963	
James Carpenter	United Kingdom	1840	1899	
Richard Christopher Carrington	United Kingdom	1826	1875	
Sir John Carroll	United Kingdom	1899	1974	
César-François Cassini de Thury	France	1714	1784	
Dominique, comte de Cassini	France	1748	1845	
Giovanni Domenico Cassini	France	1625	1712	He discovered four satellites of Saturn and noted the division of its rings, later named the Cassini Division. In addition, he also created the first scientific map of the Moon. The Cassini space probe, launched in 1997, was named after him and became the fourth to visit Saturn and the first to orbit it.
Jacques Cassini	France	1677	1756	
Corsono Carsono	Spain	fl. c. 14th century		
Bonaventura Cavalieri	Italy	1598	1647	
Anders Celsius	Sweden	1701	1744	
Vincenzo Cerulli	Italy	1859	1927	
Jean Chacornac	France	1823	1873	
Merieme Chadid	France	1969		
James Challis	United Kingdom	1803	1882	
Radha Gobinda Chandra	Bangladesh/India	1878	1975	
Subrahmanyan Chandrasekhar	India/United States	1910	1995	He shared the 1983 Nobel Prize for Physics with William A. Fowler for "...theoretical studies of the physical processes of importance to the structure and evolution of the stars".
Carl Charlier	Sweden	1862	1934	
Auguste Charlois	France	1864	1910	
Lyudmila Ivanovna Chernykh	Russia/Ukraine	1935	2017	
Nikolai Stepanovich Chernykh	Russia/Ukraine	1931	2004	
James Christy	United States	1938		Discovered the largest of Pluto's moons, Charon
Edwin Foster Coddington	United States	1870	1950	
Jérôme Eugène Coggia	France	1849	1919	
Josep Comas i Solà	Spain	1868	1937	
Andrew Ainslie Common	United Kingdom	1841	1903	best known for his pioneering work in astrophotography.
Guy Consolmagno	United States	1952		
Janine Connes	France	1934		
Nicolaus Copernicus	Prussia/Poland	1473	1543	Copernicus discovered the heliocentric model of the Solar System.
Pablo Cottenot	France	1800	?	
Heather Couper	United Kingdom	1949	2020	In 1984, she was elected President of the British Astronomical Association, the first woman and the second-youngest person to hold the position.
Leopold Courvoisier	Switzerland	1873	1955	
Arthur Edwin Covington	Canada	1914	2001	
Philip Herbert Cowell	United Kingdom	1870	1949	
Thomas George Cowling	United Kingdom	1906	1990	
Andrew Claude de la Cherois Crommelin	United Kingdom	1865	1939	
Luíz Cruls	Brazil	1848	1908	
James Cuffey	United States	1911	1999	
Heber Doust Curtis	United States	1872	1942	
Johann Baptist Cysat	Switzerland	1587	1657	Cysat's most important work was on comets, and he observed the comet of 1618. He demonstrated at the same time that the trajectory of the comet was parabolic, not circular.
Alexander Dalgarno	United States	1928	2015	
Jacques Eugène d'Allonville	France	1671	1732	
Andre Louis Danjon	France	1890	1967	He developed several astronomical instruments to examine the regularity of the rotation of the Earth. Among his discoveries was an acceleration of the rotation of the Earth during periods of intense solar activity occurring in 11-year cycles correlated with an increase in earthquakes.
Heinrich d'Arrest	Germany	1822	1875	
George Howard Darwin	United Kingdom	1845	1912	
Roger Davies	United Kingdom	1954		
Tamara Davis	Australia			
Leonardo da Vinci	Italy	1452	1519	
William Rutter Dawes	United Kingdom	1799	1868	He made extensive drawings of Mars during its 1864 opposition. In 1867, Richard Anthony Proctor made a map of Mars based on these drawings.
Bernhard Dawson	Argentina	1890	1960	In 1958, he became the first president of the Asociación Argentina de Astronomía.
Leo de Ball	Germany/Austria	1853	1916	Discovered the asteroid 230 Athamantis.
Duília de Mello	Brazil	1963		Was responsible for the discovery of the supernova SN 1997D. She also contributed to the discovery of blue blobs, known as 'star orphanages' due to their role in forming stars outside of galaxies. And in 2013, she was involved in the discovery of the largest spiral galaxy in the universe, the Condor Galaxy NGC 6872.
Henri Debehogne	Belgium	1928	2007	
Annibale de Gasparis	Italy	1819	1892	
Jean Baptiste Joseph Delambre	France	1749	1822	
Charles-Eugène Delaunay	France	1816	1872	
Eugène Joseph Delporte	Belgium	1882	1955	
Audrey C. Delsanti	France	1976		
William Frederick Denning	United Kingdom	1848	1931	
Alíz Derekas	Hungary	1977		
Henri-Alexandre Deslandres	France	1853	1948	
Alexander Nikolaevich Deutsch	Russia	1900	1986	
Robert Dicke	United States	1916	1997	
Terence Dickinson	Canada	1943	2023	
Thomas Digges	United Kingdom	1546	1595	He was first to postulate the "dark night sky paradox".
Herbert Dingle	United States	1890	1978	
Andrea Di Paola	Italy	1970		
Ewine van Dishoeck	Netherlands	1955		
Helen Dodson Prince	United States	1905	2002	Pioneered work in solar flares at the University of Michigan.
Giovanni Battista Donati	Italy	1826	1873	Donati was a pioneer in the spectroscopic study of the stars, the Sun, and comets
Frank Drake	United States	1930		
Henry Draper	United States	1837	1882	
John Dreyer	Ireland	1852	1926	
Yuriy Drohobych	Ukraine	1450	1494	
Alexander D. Dubyago	Russia	1903	1959	
Dmitrij I. Dubyago	Russia	1850	1918	
Jean C. B. Dufay	France	1896	1967	
Raymond Smith Dugan	United States	1878	1940	
James Dunlop	Scotland	1793	1848	
Petar Đurković	Serbia	1908	1981	
Frank Watson Dyson	United Kingdom	1868	1939	
Arthur Eddington	United Kingdom	1882	1944	Around 1920, he foreshadowed the discovery and mechanism of nuclear fusion processes in stars. The Eddington limit, the natural limit to the luminosity of stars is named in his honour.
Frank K. Edmondson	United States	1912	2008	The creation of the Indiana Asteroid Program, a photographic program to locate asteroids that were "lost" when systematic observations were interrupted by World War II.
Olin J. Eggen	United States	1919	1998	He is best known for a seminal 1962 paper with Donald Lynden-Bell and Allan Sandage which suggested for the first time that the Milky Way Galaxy had collapsed out of a gas cloud.
David J. Eicher	United States	1961		
Albert Einstein	Germany	1879	1955	
Eise Eisinga	Netherlands	1744	1828	Built the Eise Eisinga Planetarium in his house in Franeker, Dutch Republic, the oldest functioning planetarium in the world.
Eric Walter Elst	Belgium	1936	2022	
Johann Franz Encke	Germany	1791	1865	
Kin Endate	Japan	1960		
Eratosthenes	Alexandria	276 BC	194 BC	
Emil Ernst	Germany	1889	1942	
Ernest Esclangon	France	1876	1954	
Fred Espenak	United States	1953		
Larry W. Esposito	United States	1951		
Eudoxus of Cnidus	Ancient Greece	c. 408 BC	c. 355 BC	
Robert Evans	Australia	1937	2022	
Sandra M. Faber	United States	1945		
David Fabricius	Netherlands	1564	1617	Fabricius discovered the first known periodic variable star
Johannes Fabricius	Netherlands	1587	1615	A modern era discoverer of sunspots in 1611
Fearon Fallows	United Kingdom	1789	1831	Catalogued over 300 stars from his observatory in South Africa.
Farghani	Persia	800	870	
Hervé Faye	France	1814	1902	
Charles Fehrenbach	France	1914	2008	
Gyula Fényi	Hungary	1845	1927	
James Ferguson	United States	1797	1867	
Gary Ferland	United States	1951		
Alex Filippenko	United States	1958		
Erwin Finlay-Freundlich	Germany	1885	1964	
Axel Firsoff	United Kingdom	1910	1981	
Debra Fischer	United States	1951		Co-authored more than 300 papers on dwarf stars and exoplanets. In two papers with Jeff Valenti, she quantified a correlation between the chemical composition of host stars and the formation of orbiting gas giant planets
J. Richard Fisher	United States	1943		
Camille Flammarion	France	1842	1925	
Gabrielle Renaudot Flammarion	France	1867	1962	
John Flamsteed	United Kingdom	1646	1719	
Honoré Flaugergues	France	1755	1835	
Williamina Fleming	United States	1857	1911	
Wilhelm Julius Foerster	Germany	1832	1921	
Alfred Fowler	United Kingdom	1868	1940	
William Alfred Fowler	United States	1911	1995	He is known for his theoretical and experimental research into nuclear reactions within stars and the energy elements produced in the process. Winner of the 1983 Nobel Prize in Physics together with Subrahmanyan Chandrasekhar.
Philip Fox	United States	1878	1944	
Andrew Fraknoi	United States	1948		
Joseph von Fraunhofer	Germany	1787	1826	Designed the heliometer used successfully to calculate the distance to a star, other than the Sun, for the first time.
Herbert Friedman	United States	1916	2000	
Dirk D. Frimout	Belgium	1941		
Edwin Brant Frost	United States	1866	1935	
Shigehisa Fujikawa	Japan			
Naoshi Fukushima	Japan	1925	2003	
Kiichirō Furukawa	Japan	1929	2016	
Toshimasa Furuta	Japan			
Bryan Gaensler	Australia	1973		
Galileo Galilei	Italy	1564	1642	
Gan De	China	fl. 4th century BC		Gan De, together with Shi Shen compiled China's first star catalogue
Gordon J. Garradd	Australia	1959		
Julio Garavito Armero	Colombia	1865	1920	
Ben Gascoigne	New Zealand/Australia	1915	2010	
Gautama Siddha	China	fl. 8th century AD		
Margaret Geller	United States	1947		
Johann Gottfried Galle	Germany	1812	1910	Was the first person to view the planet Neptune and know what he was looking at.
George Gamow	Russia/United States	1904	1968	
Carl Friedrich Gauss	Germany	1777	1855	
Tom Gehrels	United States	1925	2011	Pioneered the first photometric system of asteroids in the 1950s, and wavelength dependence of polarization of stars and planets in the 1960s
Neil Gehrels	United States	1952	2017	Gamma-ray astronomy; led Neil Gehrels Swift Observatory; led Nancy Grace Roman Space Telescope.
Robert Gendler	United States	1957		
Andrea M. Ghez	United States	1965		
Aurélien Barrau	France	1973		
Riccardo Giacconi	Italy	1931	2018	Nobel Prize-winning astrophysicist who laid down the foundations of X-ray astronomy
Michel Giacobini	France	1873	1938	
Henry L. Giclas	United States	1910	2007	
David Gill	United Kingdom	1843	1914	
Michaël Gillon	Belgium	1974		
Ian Glass	Ireland/South Africa	1939		
Karl Glazebrook	United Kingdom	1965		Determined that the average color of the vast universe is Cosmic Latte.
Marcelo Gleiser	Brazil	1959		
Thomas Gold	United States	1920	2004	
Leo Goldberg	United States	1913	1987	
Peter Goldreich	United States	1939		
Hermann Goldschmidt	Germany	1802	1866	In 1820, Goldschmidt discovered shadow bands in total solar eclipses
François Gonnessiat	France	1856	1934	
John Goodricke	United Kingdom	1764	1786	
Alyssa A. Goodman	United States	1962		
Abu Sa'id Gorgani	Persia	9th century		
Paul Götz	Germany	1883	1962	
Benjamin Apthorp Gould	United States	1824	1896	He is noted for creating the Astronomical Journal, discovering the Gould Belt, and for founding of the Argentine National Observatory and the Argentine National Weather Service.
Andrew Graham	Ireland	1815	1907	discoverer of the asteroid 9 Metis
Charles Green	England	1735	1771	
Jesse Greenstein	United States	1909	2002	
John Grunsfeld	United States	1956		
Edward Guinan	United States	1922		
Jay U. Gunter	United States	1911	1994	
Alexander A. Gurshtein	Russia	1937	2020	
Bengt Gustafsson	Sweden	1943		
Guo Shoujing	China	1231	1316	
Alan Harvey Guth	United States	1947		
Yusuke Hagihara	Japan	1897	1979	
Alan Hale	United States	1958		co-discovered Comet Hale–Bopp
George Ellery Hale	United States	1868	1938	
Asaph Hall	United States	1829	1907	
Edmond Halley	England	1656	1742	
Erika Hamden	United States	?		
Heidi Hammel	United States	1960		
Mario Hamuy	Chile	1960		
Peter Andreas Hansen	Denmark	1795	1874	
Abulfazl Harawi	Persia	10th century		
Karl Ludwig Harding	Germany	1765	1834	Was a part of the so-called 'celestial police' group, which made the orbital calculations leading to the discovery of many dwarf planets between Mars and Jupiter.
Thomas Hariot	United Kingdom	1560	1621	his 1609 drawings of his observations of the Moon have been noted as the first recorded telescopic observations ever made
Guillermo Haro	Mexico	1913	1988	Haro was influential in the development of modern observational astronomy in Mexico. Internationally, he is best known for his contribution to the discovery of Herbig–Haro objects.
Robert George Harrington	United States	1904	1987	He discovered or co-discovered a number of comets, including periodic comets 43P/Wolf–Harrington and 51P/Harrington
Robert Sutton Harrington	United States	1942	1993	
Edward Robert Harrison	United Kingdom/United States	1917	2007	
William Kenneth Hartmann	United States	1939		
John Hartnup Jr.	United Kingdom	1841	1892	
Lisa Harvey-Smith	Australia	1979		
Takeo Hatanaka	Japan	1914	1963	
Stephen Hawking	United Kingdom	1942	2018	
Will Hay	United Kingdom	1888	1949	
Chushiro Hayashi	Japan	1920	2010	
Otto Hermann Leopold Heckmann	Germany	1901	1983	
E. Ruth Hedeman	United States	1910	2006	
Carl Heiles	United States	1939		
Joseph Helffrich	Germany	1872	1971	
Eleanor Helin	United States	1932	2009	
Maximilian Hell	Austria-Hungary	1720	1792	
Karl Ludwig Hencke	Germany	1793	1866	
Thomas Henderson	Scotland	1798	1844	noted for being the first person to measure the distance to Alpha Centauri
Paul Henry	France	1848	1905	
Prosper Henry	France	1849	1903	
Abraham bar Hiyya	Spanish Jewish	1070	1136	
George Howard Herbig	United States	1920	2013	best known for his contribution to the discovery of Herbig–Haro objects
Carl W. Hergenrother	United States	1973		
Caroline Herschel	United Kingdom	1750	1848	
John Herschel	United Kingdom	1792	1871	Discoveries of Herschel include the galaxies NGC 7, NGC 10, NGC 25, and NGC 28.
William Herschel	United Kingdom/Germany	1738	1822	Herschel discovered Uranus in 1781.
Ejnar Hertzsprung	Denmark	1873	1967	He developed a classification system for stars to divide them by spectral type, stage in their development, and luminosity, the Hertzsprung–Russell diagram.
Johannes Hevelius	Poland	1611	1687	discovered the Moon's libration in longitude
Antony Hewish	United Kingdom	1924	2021	won the Nobel Prize for Physics in 1974 for his role in the discovery of pulsars.
George William Hill	United States	1838	1914	
John Russell Hind	United Kingdom	1823	1895	
Hipparchus	Nicaea	c. 190 BC	120 BC	Hipparchus is considered the greatest ancient astronomical observer and, by some, the greatest overall astronomer of antiquity. He was the first whose quantitative and accurate models for the motion of the Sun and Moon survive.
Masanori Hirasawa	Japan			
Kiyotsugu Hirayama	Japan	1874	1943	
Shin Hirayama	Japan	1868	1945	
Gustave-Adolphe Hirn	France	1815	1890	
Paul Ho	United States			
Sebastian von Hoerner	Germany	1919	2003	
Cuno Hoffmeister	Germany	1892	1968	
Dorrit Hoffleit	United States	1907	2007	
Helen Sawyer Hogg	Canada	1905	1993	pioneered research into globular clusters and variable stars. She was the first female president of several astronomical organizations and a scientist when many universities would not award scientific degrees to women.
Moses Holden	United Kingdom	1777	1864	
Paulo R. Holvorcem	Brazil	1967		
Minoru Honda	Japan	1917	1990	
Kamil Hornoch	Czech Republic	1972		
Jeremiah Horrocks	United Kingdom	c. 1619	1641	First person to demonstrate the Moon's elliptical orbit around the Earth. He predicted, observed and recorded the 1639 transit of Venus.
Ingrid van Houten-Groeneveld	Netherlands	1921	2015	
Herbert Alonzo Howe	United States	1858	1926	
Steve B. Howell	United States	1955		Howell was fundamental in the development of CCD astronomy especially CCD photometry of faint sources. He was the Project Scientist for the NASA Kepler and K2 Exoplanet missions.
Fred Hoyle	United Kingdom	1915	2001	
Edwin Powell Hubble	United States	1889	1953	Hubble proved that many objects previously thought to be clouds of dust and gas and classified as "nebulae" were actually galaxies beyond the Milky Way. He provided evidence for Hubble–Lemaître law, the fact that the universe is ever expanding.
William Huggins	United Kingdom	1824	1910	
Russell Alan Hulse	United States	1950		
Hendrik Christoffel van de Hulst	Netherlands	1918	2000	
Milton Lasell Humason	United States	1891	1972	
Thomas John Hussey	England	1792	1854	
Christiaan Huygens	Netherlands	1629	1695	Discovered the largest moon of Saturn, Titan
Yuji Hyakutake	Japan	1950	2002	
Josef Allen Hynek	United States	1910	1986	
Hypatia	Egypt	c. 350–370	415	
Christopher Hansteen	Norway	1784	1873	best known for his mapping of Earth's magnetic field.
Icko Iben Jr.	United States	1931		
Kaoru Ikeya	Japan	1943		
Chris Impey	United Kingdom/United States	1956		
Robert Thorburn Ayton Innes	Scotland/South Africa	1861	1933	
Shigeru Inoda	Japan	1955	2008	
Jamal Nazrul Islam	Bangladesh	1939	2013	
Edward Israel	United States	1859	1884	
Iwahashi Zenbei	Japan	1756	1811	
Masayuki Iwamoto	Japan	1954		
Shun-ei Izumikawa	Japan			
Cyril V. Jackson	South Africa	1903	1988	
Karan Jani	India	1988		He is part of the LIGO team made the first observation of gravitational waves from a binary black hole merger in 2015.
Pierre Jules César Janssen	France	1824	1907	
James Jeans	United Kingdom	1877	1946	
Benjamin Jekhowsky	Russia/France/Algeria	1881	1975	
Louise Freeland Jenkins	United States	1888	1970	
David C. Jewitt	United Kingdom	1958		He is best known for being the first person (along with Jane Luu) to discover a body beyond Pluto and Charon in the Kuiper belt.
Jiao Bingzhen	China	1689	1726	
John A. Johnson	United States	1977		
Alfred Harrison Joy	United States	1882	1973	
Vinod Johri	India	1935	2014	
Tetsuo Kagawa	Japan	1969		
Norio Kaifu	Japan	1943	2019	Norio directed the construction of the Nobeyama Radio Observatory and the Subaru Telescope. He was also the director of the International Astronomical Union(IAU) from 2012 to 2015.
Franz Kaiser	Germany	1891	1962	
Piet van de Kamp	Netherlands/United States	1901	1995	
Kiyotaka Kanai	Japan	1951		
Hiroshi Kaneda	Japan	1953		
Henry Kandrup	United States	1955	2003	
Jacobus Kapteyn	Netherlands	1851	1922	
Lyudmila Karachkina	Ukraine	1948		
Ghiyath al-Kashi	Persia	1380	1429	
Jeffrey Owen Katz	United States	1960		
Karlis Kaufmanis	Latvia/United States	1910	2003	
Kōyō Kawanishi	Japan	1959		
Nobuhiro Kawasato	Japan			
James Edward Keeler	United States	1857	1900	
Paul Kempf	Germany	1856	1920	
Johannes Kepler	Germany	1571	1630	
Omar Khayyám	Persia	1048	1131	
Al-Khujandi	Persia	c. 940	1000	Discovered that the axial tilt of the Earth is not constant.
Muhammad ibn Mūsā al-Khwārizmī	Persia	780	850	
Kidinnu	Babylon	fl. 4th century BC	c. 330 BC	
Hisashi Kimura	Japan	1870	1943	
Maria Margarethe Kirch	Germany	1670	1720	
Daniel Kirkwood	United States	1814	1895	
Robert Kirshner	United States	1949		
Minoru Kizawa	Japan	1947		
Ernst Friedrich Wilhelm Klinkerfues	Germany	1827	1884	
Viktor Knorre	Russia	1840	1919	
Takao Kobayashi	Japan	1961		
Toru Kobayashi	Japan			
Luboš Kohoutek	Czechoslovakia	1935		
Masahiro Koishikawa	Japan	1952	2020	
Nobuhisa Kojima	Japan	1933		
Takuo Kojima	Japan	1955		
Yoji Kondo	Japan	1933	2017	
Zdeněk Kopal	Czechoslovakia/United Kingdom/United States	1914	1993	
Sergei Kopeikin	United States	1956		
August Kopff	Germany	1882	1960	
Korado Korlević	Croatia	1958		
Hiroki Kosai	Japan	1933		
Charles T. Kowal	United States	1940	2011	
Robert Kraft	United States	1927	2015	Pioneering work on Cepheid variables, stellar rotation, novae, and the chemical evolution of the Milky Way
Ľubor Kresák	Czechoslovakia	1927	1994	
Heinrich Kreutz	Germany	1854	1927	
Edwin C. Krupp	United States	1944		
Kazuo Kubokawa	Japan	1903	1943	
Marc Kuchner	United States	1972		
Gerard Kuiper	Netherlands/United States	1905	1973	The namesake of the Kuiper belt, a region of minor planets beyond Neptune.
György Kulin	Austria-Hungary	1905	1989	
Donald Kurtz	United States	1948		
Ali Kuşçu	Turkey	1403	1474	Qushji improved on Nasir al-Din al-Tusi's planetary model and presented an alternative planetary model for Mercury.
Reiki Kushida	Japan			
Yoshio Kushida	Japan	1957		
Nicolas Louis de Lacaille	France	1713	1762	
Elizabeth Lada	United States			
Lagadha	India	1st millennium BCE		
Claes-Ingvar Lagerkvist	Sweden	1944		
Joseph-Louis Lagrange	France	1736	1813	
Emily Lakdawalla	United States	1975		
Jérôme Lalande	France	1732	1807	Calculated the distance from the moon to Earth
Johann Heinrich Lambert	France/Germany	1728	1777	
David J. Lane	Canada	1963	2024	Director of the Burke-Gaffney astronomical observatory, owner of the Abbey-Ridge Observatory, and creator of the planetarium software entitled the Earth Centered Universe.
Andrew E. Lange	United States	1957	2010	
Samuel Pierpont Langley	United States	1834	1906	
Pierre-Simon Laplace	France	1749	1827	
Jacques Laskar	France	1955		
William Lassell	United Kingdom	1799	1880	
Joseph Jean Pierre Laurent	France		1900	
Henrietta Swan Leavitt	United States	1868	1921	Discovered that Cepheid variable stars pulsated at a rate relative to the luminosity. This discovery made it possible to determine the distance to other galaxies by comparing the distance to Cepheids in our galaxy measured by Parallax and Spectroscopy and then applying the results to cepheids in other galaxies. This would eventually lead to the discovery that the Universe is expanding.
Typhoon Lee	United States/Taiwan	1948		
Guillaume Le Gentil	France	1725	1792	
Georges Lemaître	Belgium	1894	1966	Being the first the theorize that the Universe is ever expanding. The namesake of the Hubble–Lemaître law
Pierre Lemonnier	France	1715	1799	
Frederick C. Leonard	United States	1896	1960	
Armin Leuschner	United States	1868	1953	
Geraint Lewis	Australia	1969		
Urbain Le Verrier	France	1811	1877	Theorized the existence of Neptune by calculations of its influence of orbit of Uranus, which let to Neptune's discovery.
Li Fan	China	202 AD	220 AD	
Bertil Lindblad	Sweden	1895	1965	
Adolph Friedrich Lindemann	Germany/United Kingdom	1846	1927	
Chris Lintott	United Kingdom	1980		
Joseph Johann Littrow	Austria	1781	1840	
Karl L. Littrow	Austria	1811	1877	He created the only conformal retroazimuthal map projection, which is known as the Littrow projection.
Liu Xin	China	50 BCE	23 BCE	
Joseph Lockyer	United Kingdom	1836	1920	Lockyer is among the pioneers of archaeoastronomy. Travelling 1890 in Greece he noticed the east–west orientation of many temples, in Egypt he found an orientation of temples to sunrise at midsummer and towards Sirius.
Maurice Loewy	Austria/France	1833	1907	
Christian Sørensen Longomontanus	Denmark	1562	1647	
Bernard Lovell	United Kingdom	1913	2012	
Percival Lowell	United States	1855	1916	Theorized the existence of a ninth planet beyond Neptune, and contributed to the calculations that would eventually lead to the discovery of Pluto
Rosaly Lopes	Brazil	1957		
Ángel López	Spain	1955		
Álvaro López-García	Spain	1941	2019	He was a specialist in astrometry and the dynamics of minor planets, and had discovered numerous of these bodies since the early 1980s, in collaboration with astronomer Henri Debehogne.
John William Lubbock	United Kingdom	1803	1865	Lubbock carried out important studies of the tides in the 1830s. He was one of the first to present maps showing lines joining points where high tide occurred at the same time, and coined the term cotidal lines for them.
Knut Lundmark	Sweden	1889	1958	Knut Lundmark was one of the pioneers in the modern study of the galaxies and their distances. He was one of the first to suspect that the galaxies are remote stellar systems at vast distances and not nearby objects belonging to our own galaxy, the Milky Way. He also studied the light distribution in the galaxies, and discovered that the distribution could only properly be explained if the galaxies contained vast amounts of light-blocking dark clouds.
Lupitus of Barcelona	Spain	fl. 10th century		
Robert Luther	Germany	1822	1900	Luther discovered 24 asteroids between 1852 and 1890.
Jane Luu	South Vietnam/United States	1963		discovering and characterizing the Kuiper Belt and its largest members (together with David C. Jewitt and Michael Brown)
Willem Luyten	Dutch East Indies (Netherlands)	1899	1994	Luyten studied the proper motions of stars and discovered many white dwarfs. He appears to have been the first to use the term white dwarf when he examined this class of stars in 1922.
Donald Lynden-Bell	United Kingdom	1935	2018	He was the first to determine that galaxies contain supermassive black holes at their centres, and that such black holes power quasars.
Andrew Lyne	United Kingdom	1942		
Bernard Lyot	France	1897	1952	
Mahendra Suri	India	c. 1340	1400	wrote the Yantraraja, the first Indian treatise on the astrolabe.
Ma Yize	China	910	1005	
Adriaan van Maanen	United States	1884	1946	
George Parker 2nd Earl of Macclesfield	United Kingdom	c. 1697	1764	
Amy Mainzer	United States	1974		
Steve Mandel	United States			
Geoff Marcy	United States	1954		
Simon Marius	Germany	1573	1624	
Brian G. Marsden	United States	1937	2010	
Albert Marth	Germany	1828	1897	He discovered one of the early asteroids found, 29 Amphitrite, and the galaxies NGC 3, NGC 4 and NGC 15.
Nevil Maskelyne	United Kingdom	1732	1811	
Charles Mason	United Kingdom/United States	1730	1787	
John C. Mather	United States	1946		
Janet Akyüz Mattei	Turkey/United States	1943	2004	
Edward Walter Maunder	United Kingdom	1851	1928	His study of sunspots and the solar magnetic cycle led to his identification of the period from 1645 to 1715 that is now known as the Maunder Minimum.
Pierre Louis Maupertuis	France	1698	1759	He is often credited with having discovered the principle of least action – a version of which is known as Maupertuis's principle
Alain Maury	France	1958		
Matthew Fontaine Maury	United States	1806	1873	
Brian May	United Kingdom	1947		studying reflected light from interplanetary dust and the velocity of dust in the plane of the Solar System.
Cornell Mayer	United States	1922	2005	the first to accurately measure the temperature of Venus by measuring the planet's thermal radiation.
Tobias Mayer	Germany	1723	1762	
Michel Mayor	Switzerland	1942		
Christopher McKee	United States	1942		
Robert S. McMillan	United States			
William H. McCrea	United Kingdom	1904	1999	
Bruce A. McIntosh	Canada	1929	2015	
Jess McIver	United States			
Robert H. McNaught	Australia	1956		
Pierre Méchain	France	1744	1804	Together with Charles Messier, he was a major contributor to the early study of deep-sky objects and comets.
Thebe Medupe	South Africa	1973		
Karen Jean Meech	United States	1959		Meech specializes in planetary astronomy, in particular the study of distant comets and their relation to the early Solar System.
Aden Baker Meinel	United States	1922	2011	His research interests have included upper atmospheric physics, glass technology, optical design, instrumentation and space systems.
Fulvio Melia	United States	1956		
Philibert Jacques Melotte	United Kingdom	1880	1961	
Paul Willard Merrill	United States	1887	1961	
David Merritt	United States	1955		
Charles Messier	France	1730	1817	He published an astronomical catalogue consisting of 110 nebulae and star clusters, which came to be known as the Messier objects, referred to with the letter M and their number between 1 and 110.
Joel Hastings Metcalf	United States	1866	1925	He discovered or co-discovered several comets, including 23P/Brorsen-Metcalf and 97P/Metcalf-Brewington, and also 41 asteroids during 1905–1914, as credited by the Minor Planet Center.
Andreas Gerasimos Michalitsianos	United States	1947	1997	
John Michell	United Kingdom	1724	1793	The first person known to have proposed the existence of black holes
Elia Millosevich	Italy	1848	1919	
Edward Arthur Milne	United Kingdom	1896	1950	
Rudolph Minkowski	Germany	1895	1976	
Marcel Gilles Jozef Minnaert	Belgium/Netherlands	1893	1970	In 1941, he invented the Minnaert function, which is used in optical measurements of celestial bodies.
Maria Mitchell	United States	1818	1889	
Seidai Miyasaka	Japan	1955		
Yoshikane Mizuno	Japan	1954		
August Ferdinand Möbius	Germany	1790	1868	
Anthony Moffat	Canada			
Johan Maurits Mohr	Netherlands	1716	1775	
Samuel Molyneux	United Kingdom	1689	1728	best known for his work in attempting to measure the parallax of Gamma Draconis leading to the discovery of the aberration of light
Geminiano Montanari	Italy	1633	1687	He is best known for his observation, made around 1667, that the second-brightest star (called Algol as derived from its name in Arabic) in the constellation of Perseus varied in brightness.
Patrick Moore	United Kingdom	1923	2012	Renowned for his expertise in Moon observation and the creation of the Caldwell catalogue, Moore authored more than seventy astronomy books.
James Michael Moran	United States	1943		
William Wilson Morgan	United States	1906	1994	Known for helping prove the existence of spiral arms in our galaxy.
Hiroshi Mori	Japan	1958		
Amédée Mouchez	France	1821	1892	
Antonín Mrkos	Czechoslovakia	1918	1996	
Jean Mueller	United States	1950		
Masaru Mukai	Japan	1949		
Gustav Müller	Germany	1851	1925	
Johannes Müller	Germany	1436	1476	
Harutaro Murakami	Japan	1872	1947	
Osamu Muramatsu	Japan	1949		
Tara Murphy	Australia			
bin Musa Ahmad	Persia	805	873	
bin Musa Hasan	Persia	810	873	
bin Musa Muhammad	Persia	c. 800	873	
Carole Mundell	United Kingdom			
Nils Mustelin	Finland	1931	2004	
Nilakantha Somayaji	India	1444	1544	In his Tantrasangraha, Nilakantha revised Aryabhata's model for the planets Mercury and Venus. According to George G. Joseph his equation of the centre for these planets remained the most accurate until the time of Johannes Kepler in the 17th century.
Valentin Naboth	Germany/Italy	1523	1593	
Naburimannu	Babylonia			Sometime between 6th and 2nd centuries BC
Takeshi Nagata	Japan	1913	1991	
Ahmad Nahavandi	Persia	7th–8th century		
Akimasa Nakamura	Japan	1961		
Syuichi Nakano	Japan	1947		
Jayant Narlikar	India	1938	2025	
Naubakht	Persia	d. 776		
Al-fadl ibn Naubakht	Persia	8th century		
Otto Neugebauer	Germany/United States	1899	1990	known for his research on the history of astronomy and the other exact sciences as they were practiced in antiquity and the Middle Ages. By studying clay tablets, he discovered that the ancient Babylonians knew much more about mathematics and astronomy than had been previously realized.
Grigoriy Nikolaevich Neujmin	Georgia/Russia	1886	1946	
Simon Newcomb	United States	1835	1909	
Isaac Newton	United Kingdom	1643	1727	Created first reflecting telescope; also known for the suggestion that high-altitude sites are best for observation.
Seth Barnes Nicholson	United States	1891	1963	Known for discovering several moons of Jupiter in the 20th century.
Albertus Antonie Nijland	Netherlands	1868	1936	
Tsuneo Niijima	Japan	1955		
Peter Nilson	Sweden	1937	1998	
Hōei Nojiri	Japan	1885	1977	
Jaime Nomen	Spain	1960		
Toshiro Nomura	Japan	1954		
Knut Jørgen Røed Ødegaard	Norway	1966		
Okuro Oikawa	Japan	1896	1970	
Tarmo Oja	Sweden	1934		
Tomimaru Okuni	Japan	1931		
Nicolaus Olahus	Hungary	1493	1568	
Heinrich Wilhelm Matthias Olbers	Germany	1758	1840	Was a part of the so-called 'celestial police' group, which made the orbital calculations leading to the discovery of many dwarf planets between Mars and Jupiter.
Gerard O'Neill	United States	1927	1992	
Jan Hendrik Oort	Netherlands	1900	1992	Determined that the Milky Way rotates, and disproved that the Sun is the center of the Milky Way.
Pieter Oosterhoff	Netherlands	1904	1978	
Ernst Öpik	Estonia/Ireland	1893	1985	
José Luis Ortiz Moreno	Spain	1967		Led the team to discover the dwarf planet Haumea in 2004
Yoshiaki Oshima	Japan	1952		
Donald Edward Osterbrock	United States	1924	2007	
Liisi Oterma	Finland	1915	2001	
Satoru Otomo	Japan	1957		
Jean Abraham Chrétien Oudemans	Netherlands	1827	1906	
Rafael Pacheco	Spain	1954		
Bohdan Paczyński	Poland	1940	2007	
Ľudmila Pajdušáková	Czechoslovakia	1916	1979	
Johann Palisa	Austria	1848	1925	
Johann Palitzsch	Germany	1723	1788	
Anton Pannekoek	Netherlands	1873	1960	
Eugene Parker	United States	1927	2022	
William Parsons (Lord Rosse)	Ireland	1800	1867	discovered the spiral nature of some nebulae, today known to be spiral galaxies
Miriani Griselda Pastoriza	Brazil	1939		
André Patry	France	1902	1960	
Cecilia Payne-Gaposchkin	United Kingdom/United States	1900	1979	
Ruby Payne-Scott	Australia	1912	1981	
James Peebles	Canada/United States	1935		
Sir Cuthbert Peek, 2nd Baronet	United Kingdom	1855	1901	
Leslie Copus Peltier	United States	1900	1980	
Roger Penrose	United Kingdom	1931		
Arno Penzias	United States/Germany	1933	2024	
Saul Perlmutter	United States	1959		Proved that the expansion rate of the universe is expanding.
Charles Dillon Perrine	United States/Argentina	1867	1951	
Henri Joseph Anastase Perrotin	France	1845	1904	
Christian Heinrich Friedrich Peters	Germany/United States	1813	1890	
George Henry Peters	United States	1863	1947	
Mark M. Phillips	United States	1951		
Giuseppe Piazzi	Italy	1746	1826	Discovered the dwarf planet Ceres
Edward Charles Pickering	United States	1846	1919	
William Henry Pickering	United States	1858	1938	
Paris Pişmiş	Armenia/Mexico	1911	1999	
Maynard Pittendreigh	United States	1954		
Phil Plait	United States	1964		
Giovanni Antonio Amedeo Plana	Italy	1781	1864	
Petrus Plancius	Netherlands	1552	1622	
John Stanley Plaskett	Canada	1865	1941	
Norman Robert Pogson	United Kingdom	1829	1891	He discovered several minor planets and made observations on comets. He introduced a mathematical scale of stellar magnitudes with the ratio of two successive magnitudes being the fifth root of one hundred (~2.512) and referred to as Pogson's ratio.
Christian Pollas	France	1947		
John Pond	England	1767	1836	
Jean-Louis Pons	France	1761	1831	
Carolyn Porco	United States	1953		
Vladimír Porubčan	Czechoslovakia	1940		
Charles Pritchard	United Kingdom	1808	1893	
Richard Proctor	England	1837	1888	
Milorad B. Protić	Serbia	1911	2001	
Ptolemy of Alexandria	Roman Egypt	c. 85	165	
Pierre Puiseux	France	1855	1928	
Georg Purbach	Germany	1423	1461	
Pythagoras of Samos	Greece	580 BC	500 BC	credited with having been the first to teach that the Earth was spherical, the first to divide the globe into five climatic zones, and the first to identify the morning star and the evening star as the same celestial object (now known as Venus).
Adolphe Quetelet	Belgium	1796	1874	
M. Shahid Qureshi	Pakistan			
Ali Qushji	Ottoman Empire	1403	1474	
David Lincoln Rabinowitz	United States	1960		Co-discoverer of the dwarf planet Eris in 2006
Narayan Chandra Rana	India	1954	1996	
Grote Reber	United States	1911	2002	For nearly a decade he was the world's only radio astronomer.
Martin Rees	United Kingdom	1942		
Edward Ayearst Reeves	United Kingdom	1862	1945	Geographer and astronomer
Hubert Reeves	Canada	1932	2023	
Johannes Müller	Germany	1436	1476	
Julius Reichelt	Germany	1637	1717	
Erasmus Reinhold	Prussia, Germany	1511	1553	
Karl Reinmuth	Germany	1892	1979	
Pieter Johannes van Rhijn	Netherlands	1886	1960	
Giovanni Battista Riccioli	Italy	1598	1671	Discovering the first double star.
Mercedes Richards	Jamaica	1955	2016	Pioneering research in the tomography of interacting binary star systems and cataclysmic variable stars to predict magnetic activity and simulate gas flow is her most known work. She was the first to use tomography in astronomy.
Jean Richer	France	1630	1696	His observations and measurements of Mars during its perihelic opposition, coupled with those made simultaneously in Paris by Giovanni Domenico Cassini, led to the earliest data-based estimate of the distance between Earth and Mars, which they then used to calculate the distance between the Sun and Earth (the astronomical unit).
Edward Riddle	England	1788	1854	Riddle's most valuable work was A Treatise on Navigation and Nautical Astronomy (1824; 4th edition 1842; 8th edition 1864), forming a complete course of mathematics for sailors.
Adam Riess	United States	1969		He is known for his research in using supernovae as cosmological probes and for being part of the team that proved that the expansion rate of the universe is expanding.
Fernand Rigaux	Belgium	1905	1962	
George Willis Ritchey	United States	1864	1945	
David Rittenhouse	United States	1732	1796	
Hans-Walter Rix	Germany	1964		
Carmelle Robert	Canada	1962		
Arjen Roelofs	Netherlands	1754	1824	
Elizabeth Roemer	United States	1929	2016	
Roger of Hereford	England	c. 1176	1198	
Nancy G. Roman	United States	1925	2018	
Gustavo E. Romero	Argentina	1964		
Ole Christensen Rømer	Denmark	1644	1710	Discovered that light travels at a finite speed and made the first measurement of the speed of light.
Otto A. Rosenberger	Germany	1800	1890	
Svein Rosseland	Norway	1894	1985	
Bruno Rossi	Italy	1905	1993	
Laurie Rousseau-Nepton	Canada			
Vera Rubin	United States	1928	2016	Studied the rotation of Galaxies. Her research provided evidence for the discovery of Dark matter.
Henry Chamberlain Russell	Australia	1836	1907	
Henry Norris Russell	United States	1877	1957	
Martin Ryle	United Kingdom	1918	1984	Won the Nobel Prize for Physics in 1974 for his role in the discovery of pulsars.
Sir Edward Sabine	Ireland	1788	1883	
Sadr al-Shari'a al-Asghar	Uzbekistan	?	1346	He was a theoretical astronomer and religious scholar who created original and sophisticated astronomical theories of time and place, and under circumstances that have long been considered devoid of original scientific research.
Carl Sagan	United States	1934	1996	
Megh Nad Saha	India	1893	1956	Best known for developing the Saha ionization equation, which has been instrumental in understanding the physical and chemical properties of stars.
Edwin Ernest Salpeter	Austria/Australia/United States	1924	2008	
Allan Rex Sandage	United States	1926	2010	
Hendricus Gerardus van de Sande Bakhuyzen	Netherlands	1838	1923	
Wallace Leslie William Sargent	United Kingdom/United States	1935	2012	
Anneila Sargent	United Kingdom/United States	1942		
Naoto Sato	Japan	1953		
Alexandre Schaumasse	France	1882	1958	
Giovanni Schiaparelli	Italy	1835	1910	
Frank Schlesinger	United States	1871	1943	
Bernhard Schmidt	Estonia/Sweden/Germany	1879	1935	
Brian P. Schmidt	United States	1967		Proved that the expansion rate of the universe is expanding.
Maarten Schmidt	Netherlands	1929	2022	
Robert Schommer	United States	1946	2001	
Johann Hieronymus Schröter	Germany	1745	1816	Was a part of the so-called 'celestial police' group, which made the orbital calculations leading to the discovery of many dwarf planets between Mars and Jupiter.
Lipót Schulhof	Hungary	1847	1921	
Heinrich Christian Schumacher	Germany	1780	1850	
Hans-Emil Schuster	Germany	1934		
Samuel Heinrich Schwabe	Germany	1789	1875	
Karl Schwarzschild	Germany	1873	1916	Schwarzschild provided the first exact solution to the Einstein field equations of general relativity, for the limited case of a single spherical non-rotating mass. The Schwarzschild solution leads to a derivation of the Schwarzschild radius, which is the size of the event horizon of a non-rotating black hole.
Martin Schwarzschild	Germany/United States	1912	1997	
Friedrich Karl Arnold Schwassmann	Germany	1870	1964	
James Vernon Scotti	United States	1960		
Frederick Hanley Seares	United States	1873	1964	
George Mary Searle	United States	1839	1918	
Angelo Secchi	Italy	1818	1878	One of the first scientists to state authoritatively that the Sun is a star.
Sadao Sei	Japan			
Waltraut Seitter	Germany	1930	2007	
Tsutomu Seki	Japan	1930		
Carl Keenan Seyfert	United States	1911	1960	He is best known for his 1943 research paper on high-excitation line emission from the centers of some spiral galaxies, which are named Seyfert galaxies after him.
Grigory Abramovich Shajn	Russia	1892	1956	
Pelageya Fedorovna Shajn	Russia	1894	1956	
Harlow Shapley	United States	1885	1972	
Richard Sheepshanks	United Kingdom	1794	1855	
Shen Kuo	China	1031	1095	
Shi Shen	China	fl. 4th century BC		Together with Gan De, compiled China's first star catalogue.
Shibukawa Shunkai	Japan	1639	1715	
Yoshisada Shimizu	Japan	1943		amateur astronomer and a prolific discoverer of hundreds of asteroids since 1993. An orthopaedist by profession, he is also known as an astrophotographer.
Shinzo Shinjo	Japan	1873	1938	
Qutb eddin Shirazi	Persia	1236	1311	
Iosif Samuilovich Shklovsky	Russia	1916	1985	
Vladimir Shkodrov	Bulgaria	1930	2010	
Carolyn Jean Spellmann Shoemaker	United States	1929	2021	
Eugene Merle Shoemaker	United States	1928	1997	
Edward M. Sion	United States	1946		
Willem de Sitter	Netherlands	1872	1934	De Sitter made major contributions to the field of physical cosmology. He co-authored a paper with Albert Einstein in 1932 in which they discussed the implications of cosmological data for the curvature of the universe.
Charlotte Moore Sitterly	United States	1898	1990	
Brian A. Skiff	United States			
John Francis Skjellerup	Australia/South Africa	1875	1952	
Vesto Melvin Slipher	United States	1875	1969	
William Marshall Smart	United Kingdom	1889	1975	
Tamara Mikhaylovna Smirnova	Russia	1935	2001	
George Smoot	United States	1945	2025	
William Henry Smyth	United Kingdom	1788	1865	
Snell	Netherlands	1580	1626	
Mary Fairfax Somerville	United Kingdom	1780	1872	
Sir James South	United Kingdom	1785	1867	
Sir Harold Spencer Jones	United Kingdom	1890	1960	
Lyman Spitzer	United States	1914	1997	
Friederich Wilhelm Gustav Spörer	Germany	1822	1895	
Rainer Spurzem	Germany	1956		
Anton Staus	Germany	1872	1955	
Joel Stebbins	United States	1878	1966	
Johan Stein	Netherlands	1871	1951	
Karl August von Steinheil	Germany	1801	1870	
Édouard Stephan	France	1837	1923	In 1873, Stephan was the first person to attempt to measure the angular diameter of a star using interferometry
David J. Stevenson	New Zealand	1948		
Edward James Stone	England	1831	1897	
F. J. M. Stratton	United Kingdom	1881	1960	
Bengt Georg Daniel Strömgren	Denmark	1908	1987	He found that the chemical composition of stars was very much different than previously assumed. In the late 1930s, he found the relative abundance of hydrogen to be nearly 70%, and helium to be about 27%.
Karl Hermann Struve	Russia/Germany	1854	1920	
Gustav Wilhelm Ludwig Struve	Russia	1858	1920	
Otto Struve	Russia/United States	1897	1963	
Su Song	China	1020	1101	
Matsuo Sugano	Japan	1939		
Atsushi Sugie	Japan			
Nicholas Suntzeff	United States	1952		
Rashid Alievich Sunyaev	Uzbekistan/Russia/Germany	1943		
Shohei Suzuki	Japan			
Lewis A. Swift	United States	1820	1913	
Frédéric Sy	France	1861	1917	
Akihiko Tago	Japan	1932		
Atsushi Takahashi	Japan	1965		
Kesao Takamizawa	Japan	1952		
Yasuo Tanaka	Japan	1931	2018	
Pierre Tardi	France	1897	1972	
Jill Tarter	United States	1944		Research in extra-terristrial light. Came up with the name Brown dwarfs for substellar entities.
Joseph Hooton Taylor Jr.	United States	1941		
John Tebbutt	Australia	1834	1916	
Ernst Wilhelm Leberecht Tempel	Germany	1821	1889	
Thabit ibn Qurra	Iraq	826	901	
Thorvald Nicolai Thiele	Denmark	1838	1910	
Louis Thollon	France	1829	1887	
Norman G. Thomas	United States	1930	2020	
John Thome	United States/Argentina	1843	1908	
Kip Stephen Thorne	United States	1940		
Friedrich Tietjen	Germany	1834	1895	
Beatrice Muriel Hill Tinsley	New Zealand/United States	1941	1981	
François Félix Tisserand	France	1845	1896	
Johann Daniel Titius	Germany	1729	1796	
Clyde W. Tombaugh	United States	1906	1997	Discovered Pluto as well as numerous asteroids
Kōichirō Tomita	Japan	1925	2006	
Richard Tousey	United States	1908	1997	
Charles Townes	United States	1915	2015	
Virginia Trimble	United States	1943		
Chad Trujillo	United States	1973		Co-discoverer of multiple dwarf planets beyond Pluto, including Quaoar in 2002, Makemake in 2005 and Eris in 2006. This triggered a debate on the definition of a planet.
Robert Julius Trumpler	United States	1886	1956	
R. Brent Tully	United States	1943		
Herbert Hall Turner	England	1861	1930	Coined the term Parsec, a very large unit of distance to measure the distance to objects outside the solar system
Nasir al-Din Tusi	Persia	1201	1274	In astronomy, al-Tusi created very accurate tables of planetary motion, an updated planetary model, and critiques of Ptolemaic astronomy.
Horace Parnell Tuttle	United States	1839	1923	Discovered the asteroids 66 Maja and 73 Klytia, as well as a list of comets.
Neil deGrasse Tyson	United States	1958		
Seiji Ueda	Japan	1952		
Ulugh Beg	Uzbekistan	1394	1449	
Antonio de Ulloa	Spain	1716	1795	Ulloa is remembered principally for his role in determining the figure of the Earth
Albrecht Unsöld	Germany	1905	1995	
Takeshi Urata	Japan	1947	2012	In 1978 he became the first amateur to discover a minor planet (2090 Mizuho) in over fifty years
Mu'ayyad al-Din al-Urdi	Persia	c. 1200	1266	
Fumiaki Uto	Japan			
Yrjö Väisälä	Finland	1891	1971	
Benjamin Valz	France	1787	1867	
James Van Allen	United States	1914	2006	
George Van Biesbroeck	Belgium/United States	1880	1974	
Hendrik Christoffel van de Hulst	Netherlands	1918	2000	Van de Hulst studied light scattering by spherical particles and wrote his doctoral thesis on the topic, subsequently formulating the anomalous diffraction theory.
Peter van de Kamp	United States	1901	1995	
Sidney van den Bergh	Canada	1929		
Martin van den Hove	Netherlands	1605	1639	Van den Hove developed a method for measuring the diameters of planets based on the measured visual angle that his telescope revealed. His was probably the first independent set of measurements of the apparent sizes of the planets and fixed stars since the work of Hipparchus in his On Sizes and Distances some seventeen centuries earlier.
Hendricus Gerardus van de Sande Bakhuyzen	Netherlands	1838	1923	
Hendrik van Gent	Netherlands/South Africa	1900	1947	
Cornelis Johannes van Houten	Netherlands	1920	2002	
Pieter Johannes van Rhijn	Netherlands	1886	1960	
Sylvie Vauclair	France	1946		She has made important contributions to helioseismology and asteroseismology by studying the influence of the detailed internal chemical composition on the observed frequencies.
Gérard de Vaucouleurs	France/United States	1918	1995	
Zdeňka Vávrová	Czechoslovakia	1945		
Jean-Pierre Verdet	France	1932		
Philippe Véron	France	1939	2014	
Frank Washington Very	United States	1852	1927	Very's most important work was in measuring the temperatures of the surfaces of the Moon and other planets using a bolometer.
Yvon Villarceau	France	1813	1883	
Julie Vinter Hansen	Denmark	1890	1960	She is the first woman to be obtain a scientific degree in astronomy in Denmark, known for her accurate computation of orbits of minor planets and comets.
Hermann Carl Vogel	Germany	1841	1907	
Friedrich Georg Wilhelm von Struve	Germany/Russia	1793	1864	
Otto Wilhelm von Struve	Russia	1819	1905	
Alexander N. Vyssotsky	Russia/United States	1888	1973	His best known work is probably a catalog with five lists of stars titled Dwarf M Stars Found Spectrophotometrically. This work was important because it was the first list of nearby stars identified not by their motions in the sky, but by their intrinsic, spectroscopic, characteristics.
Emma Vyssotsky	United States	1894	1975	her specialty was the motion of stars and the kinematics of the Milky Way.
Arno Arthur Wachmann	Germany	1902	1990	With Arnold Schwassmann he co-discovered the periodic comets 29P/Schwassmann–Wachmann, 31P/Schwassmann–Wachmann and 73P/Schwassmann–Wachmann. The Minor Planet Center credits him with the discovery of 3 asteroids during 1938–1939.
Abul Wáfa	Persia	940	997/998	
Walcher of Malvern	England	?	1135	
George Wallerstein	United States	1930	2021	
William Wales	United Kingdom	c. 1734	1798	
Qingde Wang	United States/China			
Kazuro Watanabe	Japan	1955		As being responsible for the discovery of nearly 700 asteroids, many of them in association with Kin Endate.
James Craig Watson	United States	1838	1880	
Edmund Weaver	United Kingdom	1663	1748	
Kim Weaver	United States	1969		
Thomas William Webb	United Kingdom	1807	1885	
Alfred Lothar Wegener	Germany	1880	1930	
Gary A. Wegner	United States	1944		
Wei Pu	China	960	1279	
Karl von Weizsäcker	Germany	1912	2007	
Godefroy Wendelin	Belgium	1580	1667	
Richard M. West	Denmark	1941		
Gart Westerhout	Netherlands/United States	1927	2012	
Bengt Westerlund	Sweden	1921	2008	
J. G. Westphal	Germany	1824	1859	
Johann Heinrich Westphal	Germany/Italy	1794	1831	
George Wetherill	United States	1925	2006	
John Archibald Wheeler	United States	1911	2008	Popularizing the term 'wormholes', theoretical holes in spacetime
Fred Lawrence Whipple	United States	1906	2004	
Albert Whitford	United States	1905	2002	
Mary Watson Whitney	United States	1847	1921	
Chandra Wickramasinghe	United Kingdom	1939		
Paul Wild	Switzerland	1925	2014	
Olin C. Wilson	United States	1909	1994	
Rogier Windhorst	United States	1955		
Robert Wilson	United States	1936		
Vincent Wing	United Kingdom	1619	1668	Author of the Astronomia Britannica (published in 1669).
John Winthrop	Massachusetts Bay Colony	1714	1779	
Friedrich August Theodor Winnecke	Germany	1835	1897	
Carl Wirtanen	United States	1910	1990	discovered periodic comet 46P/Wirtanen, as well as eight asteroids
Jack Wisdom	United States	1953		
Gustav Witt	Germany	1866	1946	
Maximilian Wolf	Germany	1863	1932	
Aleksander Wolszczan	Poland	1946		Co-discoverer of the first confirmed extrasolar planets and pulsar planets.
Richard van der Riet Woolley	United Kingdom	1906	1986	
Thomas Wright	United Kingdom	1711	1786	He was the first to describe the shape of the Milky Way
Issei Yamamoto	Japan	1889	1959	
Masayuki Yanai	Japan	1959		
Yi Xing	China	683	727	
Anne Sewell Young	United States	1871	1961	
Charles Augustus Young	United States	1834	1908	
James Whitney Young	United States	1941		
Franz Xaver von Zach	Germany	1753	1832	The founder of the so-called 'celestial police', an informal group of astronomers looking for additional planets after the discovery of Uranus. The Celestial Police made the orbital calculations leading to the discovery of the asteroid belt and many dwarf planets between Mars and Jupiter.
Abraham Zacuto	Spain/Portugal	1450	1510	His mapping of stars led to breakthroughs in navigation.
John Zarnecki	United Kingdom	1949		
Yakov Borisovich Zel'dovich	USSR	1914	1987	Zeldovich played a key role in developing the theory of black hole evaporation due to Hawking radiation.
Zhang Daqing	China	1969		
Zhang Heng	China	78	139	
Zhang Yuzhe	China	1902	1986	
Lyudmila Vasil'evna Zhuravleva	Russia/Ukraine	1946		
Felix Ziegel	Soviet Union	1920	1988	He was the co-founder of the first officially approved Soviet UFO research group, became an overnight sensation when, on 10 November 1967, speaking on the Soviet central television, he made an extensive report on the UFO sightings registered in the USSR and encouraged viewers to send him and his colleagues first-hand accounts of their observations,
Zu Chongzhi	China	429	500	
Fritz Zwicky	Switzerland/United States	1898	1974	Zwicky was the first to use the virial theorem to discover the existence of a gravitational anomaly, which he termed dark matter.
Hong-Yee Chiu	Taiwan/United States	1932		Coined the term "Quasar" for the light emitted from the area around Supermassive black holes
Su-Shu Huang	China/United States	1915	1977	Developed the idea that all stars have a habitable zone, a distance where water could be liquid on the surface and thus there would be potential for life.
Johann Heinrich von Mädler	Germany	1794	1874	Together with Wilhelm Beer he produced the first exact map of the Moon and of Mars

== Brief alphabetical list ==
=== A ===
- Aryabhata (India, 476–550)
- Marc Aaronson (United States, 1950–1987)
- George Ogden Abell (United States, 1927–1983)
- Hiroshi Abe (Japan, 1958–)
- Antonio Abetti (Italy, 1846–1928)
- Giorgio Abetti (Italy, 1882–1982)
- Charles Greeley Abbot (United States, 1872–1973)
- Charles Hitchcock Adams (United States, 1868–1951)
- John Couch Adams (United Kingdom, 1819–1892)
- Walter Sydney Adams (United States, 1876–1956)
- Saul Adelman (United States, 1944–)
- Petrus Alphonsi (Spain, 1062–1110)
- Agrippa (Greece, fl. c. 92)
- Paul Oswald Ahnert (Germany, 1897–1989)
- Eva Ahnert-Rohlfs (Germany, 1912–1954)
- George Biddell Airy (United Kingdom, 1801–1892)
- Robert Aitken, (United States, 1864–1951)
- Makio Akiyama (Japan, 1950–)
- Al Battani (Iraq, 850–929)
- Albategnius (see Al-Batani)
- Vladimir Aleksandrovich Albitzky (Russia, 1891–1952)
- Abu Ma'shar al-Balkhi (Persia, 787–886)
- George Alcock (United Kingdom, 1913–2000)
- Harold Alden (United States, 1890–1964)
- Hannes Alfvén (Sweden, 1908–1995)
- Lawrence H. Aller (United States, 1913–2003)
- Abd Al-Rahman Al Sufi (Persia, 903–986)
- Viktor Amazaspovich Ambartsumian, (Armenia, 1912–1996)
- John August Anderson (United States, 1876–1959)
- Wilhelm Anderson (Estonia, 1880–1940)
- Marie Henri Andoyer (France, 1862–1929)
- Andronicus of Cyrrhus (Greece, fl. 100 BC)
- Anders Jonas Ångström (Sweden, 1814–1874)
- Eugène Michel Antoniadi (Greece-France, 1870–1944)
- Masakatsu Aoki (Japan, 1957–)
- Petrus Apianus (Germany, 1495–1557)
- François Arago (France, 1786–1853)
- Masaru Arai (Japan, 1952–)
- Hiroshi Araki (Japan)
- Sylvain Arend (Belgium, 1902–1992)
- Friedrich Wilhelm Argelander (Germany, 1799–1875)
- Aristarchus of Samos (Greece, c. 310 BC – c. 230 BC)
- Christoph Arnold (Germany, 1650–1695)
- Halton Christian Arp (United States, 1927–2013)
- Arzachel (Spain, 1028–1087)
- Asada Goryu (Japan, 1734–1799)
- Atsuo Asami (Japan)
- Giuseppe Asclepi (Italy, 1706–1776)
- Joseph Ashbrook (United States, 1918–1980)
- Arthur Auwers (Germany, 1838–1915)
- Adrien Auzout (France, 1622–1691)
- David Axon (England, 1951–2012)

=== B ===
- Brahmagupta (India, 598–668 CE)
- Bhaskara I (India, 629 CE)
- Bhaskara II (India, 1114–1185)
- Walter Baade (Germany, 1893–1960)
- Harold D. Babcock (United States, 1882–1968)
- Horace W. Babcock (United States, 1912–2003)
- Oskar Backlund (Sweden, 1846–1916)
- John N. Bahcall (United States, 1934–2005)
- Yoshiaki Banno (Japan, 1952–1991)
- Benjamin Baillaud (France, 1848–1934)
- Jules Baillaud (France, 1876–1960)
- Jean-Baptiste Baille (France, 1841–1918)
- Jean Sylvain Bailly (France, 1736–1793)
- Francis Baily (United Kingdom, 1774–1844)
- John Bainbridge (United Kingdom, 1582–1643)
- John E. Baldwin (United Kingdom, 1931–2010)
- Sallie Baliunas (United States, 1953–)
- Zoltán Balog (Hungary/United States, 1972–)
- Benjamin Banneker (United States, 1731–1806)
- Pietro Baracchi (Italy, Australia, 1851–1926)
- Beatriz Barbuy (Brazil, 1950–)
- Edward Emerson Barnard (United States, 1857–1923)
- Julius Bauschinger (France, 1860–1934)
- Johann Bayer (Germany, 1572–1625)
- Antonín Bečvář (Czechoslovakia, 1901–1965)
- Wilhelm Beer (Germany, 1797–1850)
- Eric F. Bell (United States)
- Sergei Ivanovich Belyavsky (Russia, 1883–1953)
- Charles L. Bennett (United States, 1956–)
- Jocelyn Bell Burnell (United Kingdom, 1943–)
- Friedrich Wilhelm Bessel (Germany, 1784–1846)
- Somnath Bharadwaj (India, 1964–)
- Wilhelm Freiherr von Biela (Austria, 1782–1856)
- Ludwig Biermann (Germany, 1907–1986)
- Wolf Bickel (Germany. 1942–)
- Guillaume Bigourdan (France, 1851–1932)
- James Binney (United Kingdom, 1950–)
- Biruni (Persia, 973–1048)
- Gennady S. Bisnovatyi-Kogan (Russia, 1941–)
- Adriaan Blaauw (Netherlands, 1914–2010)
- Nathaniel Bliss (United Kingdom, 1700–1764)
- Johann Elert Bode (Germany, 1747–1826)
- Alfred Bohrmann (Germany, 1904–2000)
- Bart Bok (Netherlands, 1906–1983)
- Charles Thomas Bolton (United States/Canada, 1943–2021)
- John Gatenby Bolton (United Kingdom/Australia, 1922–1993)
- William Cranch Bond (United States, 1789–1859)
- Alphonse Borrelly (France, 1842–1926)
- Rudjer Boscovich (Dalmatia, 1711–1787)
- Lewis Boss (United States, 1846–1912)
- Alexis Bouvard (France, 1767–1843)
- Rychard Bouwens (United States, 1972–)
- Edward L. G. Bowell (United States, 1943–)
- Ira Sprague Bowen (United States, 1898–1973)
- Louis Boyer (France, 1901–1999)
- Brian J. Boyle (Scotland and Australia, 1960–)
- Ronald N. Bracewell (Australia, United States, 1921–2007)
- James Bradley (United Kingdom, 1693–1762)
- William A. Bradfield (New Zealand, Australia, 1927–2014)
- Tycho Brahe (Denmark, 1546–1601)
- John Alfred Brashear (United States, 1840–1920)
- William Robert Brooks (United States, 1844–1922)
- Theodor Brorsen (Denmark, 1819–1895)
- Dirk Brouwer (Netherlands–United States, 1902–1966)
- Ernest William Brown (United Kingdom, 1866–1938)
- Michael (Mike) E. Brown (United States, 1965–)
- Hermann Alexander Brück (Germany, 1905–2000)
- Ismael Bullialdus (France, 1605–1694)
- Margaret Burbidge (United Kingdom–United States, 1919–2020)
- Robert Burnham Jr. (United States, 1931–1993)
- Sherburne Wesley Burnham (United States, 1838–1921)
- Schelte J. Bus (United States, 1956–)
- Bimla Buti (India, 1933–)

=== C ===
- Daniela Calzetti (United States, Italy)
- William Wallace Campbell (United States, 1862–1938)
- Annie Jump Cannon (United States, 1863–1941)
- Luigi Carnera (Italy, 1875–1962)
- Edwin Francis Carpenter (United States, 1898–1963)
- James Carpenter (United Kingdom, 1840–1899)
- Richard Christopher Carrington (United Kingdom, 1826–1875)
- Sir John Carroll (United Kingdom, 1899–1974)
- Anthony W. Case (United States, 1980–)
- César-François Cassini de Thury (France, 1714–1784)
- Dominique, comte de Cassini (France, 1748–1845)
- Giovanni Domenico Cassini (France, 1625–1712)
- Jacques Cassini (France, 1677–1756)
- Bonaventura Cavalieri (Italy, 1598–1647)
- Anders Celsius (Sweden, 1701–1744)
- Vincenzo Cerulli (Italy, 1859–1927)
- Jean Chacornac (France, 1823–1873)
- James Challis (United Kingdom, 1803–1882)
- Radha Gobinda Chandra (Bangladesh, India, 1878–1975)
- Subrahmanyan Chandrasekhar (India, United States, 1910–1995)
- Carl Charlier (Sweden, 1862–1934)
- Auguste Charlois (France, 1864–1910)
- Lyudmila Ivanovna Chernykh (Russia/Ukraine, 1935–2017)
- Nikolai Stepanovich Chernykh (Russia/Ukraine, 1931–2004)
- James Christy (United States, 1938–)
- Klim Churyumov (Ukraine, 1937–2016)
- Barry G. Clark (United States, 1938–)
- Edwin Foster Coddington (United States, 1870–1950)
- Jérôme Eugène Coggia (France, 1849–1919)
- Josep Comas i Solà (Spain, 1868–1937)
- Andrew Ainslie Common (United Kingdom, 1841–1903)
- Guy Consolmagno (United States, 1952–)
- Nicolaus Copernicus (Prussia/Poland), 1473–1543)
- Corsono Carsono (Spain)
- Janine Connes (France, 1934–)
- Pablo Cottenot (France)
- Heather Couper (United Kingdom, 1949–2020)
- Leopold Courvoisier (Switzerland, 1873–1955)
- Arthur Edwin Covington (Canada, 1914–2001)
- Philip Herbert Cowell (United Kingdom, 1870–1949)
- Thomas George Cowling (United Kingdom, 1906–1990)
- Andrew Claude de la Cherois Crommelin (United Kingdom, 1865–1939)
- Luíz Cruls (Brazil, 1848–1908)
- James Cuffey (United States, 1911–1999)
- Heber Doust Curtis (United States, 1872–1942)
- Florence Cushman (United States, 1860–1940)

=== D ===
- Alexander Dalgarno (United States, 1928–2015)
- Jacques Eugène d'Allonville (France, 1671–1732)
- Andre Louis Danjon (France, 1890–1967)
- Heinrich d'Arrest (Germany, 1822–1875)
- George Howard Darwin (United Kingdom, 1845–1912)
- Roger Davies (United Kingdom, 1954–)
- Tamara Davis (Australia)
- Leonardo da Vinci (Italy, 1452–1519)
- William Rutter Dawes (United Kingdom, 1799–1868)
- Bernhard Dawson (Argentina, 1890–1960)
- Leo de Ball (Germany, Austria, 1853–1916)
- Duília de Mello (Brazil, 1963–)
- Henri Debehogne (Belgium, 1928–2007)
- Annibale de Gasparis (Italy, 1819–1892)
- Jean Baptiste Joseph Delambre (France, 1749–1822)
- Charles-Eugène Delaunay (France, 1816–1872)
- Eugène Joseph Delporte (Belgium, 1882–1955)
- Audrey C. Delsanti (France, 1976–)
- William Frederick Denning (United Kingdom, 1848–1931)
- Alíz Derekas (Hungary, 1977–)
- Willem de Sitter (Netherlands, 1872–1934)
- Henri-Alexandre Deslandres (France, 1853–1948)
- Alexander Nikolaevich Deutsch (Russia, 1900–1986)
- Gérard de Vaucouleurs (France/United States, 1918–1995)
- Robert Dicke (United States, 1916–1997)
- Terence Dickinson (Canada, 1943–)
- Thomas Digges (United Kingdom, 1546–1595)
- Herbert Dingle (United States, 1890–1978)
- Andrea Di Paola (Italy, 1970–)
- Ewine van Dishoeck (Netherlands, 1955–)
- Giovanni Battista Donati (Italy, 1826–1873)
- Frank Drake (United States, 1930–)
- Henry Draper (United States, 1837–1882)
- Mary Anna Draper (United States, 1839–1914)
- John Dreyer (Ireland, 1852–1926)
- Alexander D. Dubyago (Russia), 1903–1959)
- Dmitrij I. Dubyago (Russia), 1850–1918)
- Jean C. B. Dufay (France, 1896–1967)
- Raymond Smith Dugan (United States, 1878–1940)
- James Dunlop (Scotland, 1793–1848)
- Richard B. Dunn (United States, 1927–2005)
- Petar Đurković (Serbia, 1908–1981)
- Frank Watson Dyson (United Kingdom, 1868–1939)

=== E ===
- Arthur Eddington (United Kingdom, 1882–1944)
- Frank K. Edmondson (United States, 1912–2008)
- Olin J. Eggen (United States, 1919–1998)
- David J. Eicher (United States, 1961–)
- Albert Einstein (Germany, 1879–1955)
- Eise Eisinga (Netherlands, 1744–1828)
- Eric Walter Elst (Belgium, 1936–2022)
- Johann Franz Encke (Germany, 1791–1865)
- Kin Endate (Japan, 1960–)
- Eratosthenes (Alexandria, 276 BC – 194 BC)
- Emil Ernst (Germany, 1889–1942)
- Ernest Esclangon (France, 1876–1954)
- Fred Espenak (United States, 1953–)
- Larry W. Esposito (United States, 1951–)
- Eudoxus (Cnidus, c. 408 BC – c. 355 BC)
- Robert Evans (Australia, 1937–2022)

=== F ===
- David Fabricius (Netherlands, 1564–1617)
- Sandra M. Faber (United States, 1945–)
- Johannes Fabricius (Netherlands, 1587–1615)
- Fearon Fallows (United Kingdom, 1789–1831)
- Hervé Faye (France, 1814–1902)
- Charles Fehrenbach (France, 1914–2008)
- Farghani (Persia, 800–870)
- James Ferguson (United States, 1797–1867)
- Alex Filippenko (United States, 1958–)
- Erwin Finlay-Freundlich (Germany, 1885–1964)
- Axel Firsoff (United Kingdom, 1910–1981)
- Debra Fischer (United States)
- J. Richard Fisher (United States, 1943–)
- Camille Flammarion (France, 1842–1925)
- Gabrielle Renaudot Flammarion (France, 1867–1962)
- John Flamsteed (United Kingdom, 1646–1719)
- Honoré Flaugergues (France, 1755–1835)
- Williamina Fleming (United States, 1857–1911)
- Wilhelm Julius Foerster (Germany, 1832–1921)
- Alfred Fowler (United Kingdom, 1868–1940)
- William Alfred Fowler (United States, 1911–1995)
- Philip Fox (United States, 1878–1944)
- Andrew Fraknoi (United States, 1948–)
- Joseph von Fraunhofer (Germany, 1787–1826)
- Herbert Friedman (United States, 1916–2000)
- Dirk D. Frimout (Belgium, 1941–)
- Edwin Brant Frost (United States, 1866–1935)
- Shigehisa Fujikawa (Japan)
- Naoshi Fukushima (Japan, 1925–2003)
- Kiichirō Furukawa (Japan, 1929–2016)
- Toshimasa Furuta (Japan)

=== G ===
- Bryan Gaensler (Australia, 1973–)
- Gan De (China, fl. 4th century BC)
- Galileo Galilei (Italy, 1564–1642)
- Julio Garavito Armero (Colombia, 1865–1920)
- Gordon J. Garradd (Australia, 1959–)
- Ben Gascoigne (New Zealand, Australia, 1915–2010)
- Margaret Geller (United States, 1947)
- Gautama Siddha (China, fl. 8th century AD)
- Johann Gottfried Galle (Germany, 1812–1910)
- George Gamow (Russia, United States, 1904–1968)
- Carl Friedrich Gauss (Germany, 1777–1855)
- Tom Gehrels (Netherlands, United States, 1925–2011)
- Neil Gehrels (United States, 1952–2017)
- Andrea M. Ghez (United States, 1965–)
- Riccardo Giacconi (Italy, 1931–2018)
- Michel Giacobini (France, 1873–1938)
- Henry L. Giclas (United States, 1910–2007)
- David Gill (United Kingdom, 1843–1914)
- Fred Gillett (United States, 1937–2001)
- Karl Glazebrook (UK, 1965–)
- Ian Glass (Ireland/South Africa, 1939–)
- Thomas Gold (United States, 1920–2004)
- Leo Goldberg (United States, 1913–1987)
- Peter Goldreich (United States, 1939–)
- Hermann Goldschmidt (Germany, 1802–1866)
- François Gonnessiat (France, 1856–1934)
- John Goodricke (United Kingdom, 1764–1786)
- Alyssa A. Goodman (United States, 1962–)
- Abu Sa'id Gorgani (Persia, 9th century)
- Paul Götz (Germany, 1883–1962)
- Benjamin Apthorp Gould (United States, 1824–1896)
- Andrew Graham (Ireland, 1815–1907)
- Kathryn Aurora Gray (Canada, 2000–)
- Charles Green (England, 1735–1771)
- Jesse Greenstein (United States, 1909–2002)
- John Grunsfeld (United States, 1956–)
- Jay U. Gunter (United States, 1911–1994)
- Alexander A. Gurshtein (Russia, 1937–2020)
- Bengt Gustafsson (Sweden, 1943–)
- Guo Shoujing (China, 1231–1316)
- Alan Harvey Guth (United States, 1947–)

=== H ===
- Yusuke Hagihara (Japan, 1897–1979)
- Alan Hale (United States, 1958–)
- George Ellery Hale (United States, 1868–1938)
- Asaph Hall (United States, 1829–1907)
- Edmond Halley (England, 1656–1742)
- Erika Hamden (United States, ?–)
- Heidi Hammel (United States, 1960–)
- Mario Hamuy (Chile, 1960–?)
- Peter Andreas Hansen (Denmark, 1795–1874)
- Abulfazl Harawi (Persia, 10th century)
- Karl Ludwig Harding (Germany, 1765–1834)
- Thomas Hariot (United Kingdom, 1560–1621)
- Guillermo Haro (Mexico, 1913–1988)
- Robert George Harrington (United States, 1904–1987)
- Robert Sutton Harrington (United States, 1942–1993)
- Edward Robert Harrison (United Kingdom/United States, 1917–2007)
- William Kenneth Hartmann (United States, 1939–)
- Lisa Harvey-Smith (Australia, 1979–)
- Takeo Hatanaka (Japan, 1914–1963)
- Tim Hawarden (South Africa, 1943–2009)
- Stephen Hawking (United Kingdom, 1942–2018)
- Will Hay (United Kingdom, 1888–1949)
- Chushiro Hayashi (Japan, 1920–2010)
- Otto Hermann Leopold Heckmann (Germany, 1901–1983)
- Carl Heiles (United States, 1939–)
- Joseph Helffrich (Germany, 1872–1971)
- Eleanor Helin (United States, 1932–2009)
- Maximilian Hell (Austria-Hungary, 1720–1792)
- Karl Ludwig Hencke (Germany, 1793–1866)
- Thomas Henderson (Scotland, 1798–1844)
- Paul Henry (France, 1848–1905)
- Prosper Henry (France, 1849–1903)
- Abraham bar Hiyya (Spanish Jewish), (1070–1136)
- George Howard Herbig (United States, 1920–2013)
- Carl W. Hergenrother (United States, 1973–)
- Caroline Herschel (United Kingdom, 1750–1848)
- John Herschel (United Kingdom, 1792–1871)
- William Herschel (United Kingdom/Germany, 1738–1822)
- Ejnar Hertzsprung (Denmark, 1873–1967)
- Johannes Hevelius (Poland, 1611–1687)
- Antony Hewish (United Kingdom, 1924–2021)
- George William Hill (United States, 1838–1914)
- John Russell Hind (United Kingdom, 1823–1895)
- Hipparchus (Nicaea, c. 190 BC–120 BC)
- Masanori Hirasawa (Japan)
- Kiyotsugu Hirayama (Japan, 1874–1943)
- Shin Hirayama (Japan, 1868–1945)
- Gustave-Adolphe Hirn (France, 1815–1890)
- Sebastian von Hoerner (Germany), 1919–2003)
- Cuno Hoffmeister (Germany, 1892–1968)
- Dorrit Hoffleit (United States, 1907–2007)
- Helen Sawyer Hogg (Canada, 1905–1993)
- Minoru Honda (Japan, 1917–1990)
- Kamil Hornoch (Czech Republic, 1972–)
- Jeremiah Horrocks (United Kingdom, c. 1619–1641)
- Cornelis Johannes van Houten (Netherlands, 1920–2002)
- Ingrid van Houten-Groeneveld (Netherlands, 1921–2015)
- Martin van den Hove (Netherlands, 1605–1639)
- Herbert Alonzo Howe (USA, 1858–1926)
- Fred Hoyle (United Kingdom, 1915–2001)
- Su-Shu Huang (China/USA, 1915-1977)
- Edwin Powell Hubble (United States, 1889–1953)
- William Huggins (United Kingdom, 1824–1910)
- Russell Alan Hulse (United States, 1950–)
- Hendrik Christoffel van de Hulst (Netherlands, 1918–2000)
- Milton Lasell Humason (United States, 1891–1972)
- Thomas John Hussey (England, 1792–1854)
- Christiaan Huygens (Netherlands, 1629–1695)
- Yuji Hyakutake (Japan, 1950–2002)
- Josef Allen Hynek (United States, 1910–1986)
- Hypatia (Egypt, (born c. 350–370; died 415 AD)
- Christopher Hansteen (Norway, 1784–1873)

=== I ===
- Icko Iben Jr. (United States, 1931–)
- Kaoru Ikeya (Japan, 1943–)
- Chris Impey (United Kingdom/United States, 1956–)
- Robert Thorburn Ayton Innes (Scotland/South Africa, 1861–1933)
- Shigeru Inoda (Japan, 1955–2008)
- Jamal Nazrul Islam (Bangladesh, 1939–2013)
- Edward Israel (United States, 1859–1884)
- Iwahashi Zenbei (Japan, 1756–1811)
- Masayuki Iwamoto (Japan, 1954–)
- Shun-ei Izumikawa (Japan)

=== J ===
- Cyril V. Jackson (South Africa, 1903–1988)
- Karan Jani (India, 1988–)
- Pierre Jules César Janssen (France, 1824–1907)
- James Jeans (United Kingdom, 1877–1946)
- Benjamin Jekhowsky (Russia/France/Algeria, 1881–1953)
- Louise Freeland Jenkins (United States, 1888–1970)
- David C. Jewitt (United Kingdom, 1958–)
- Jiao Bingzhen (China, 1689–1726)
- John A. Johnson (United States, 1977–)
- Alfred Harrison Joy (United States, 1882–1973)
- Vinod Johri (India, 1935–2014)

=== K ===
- Ali Kuşçu (Turkey, 1403–1474)
- Tetsuo Kagawa (Japan, 1969–)
- Franz Kaiser (Germany, 1891–1962)
- Kiyotaka Kanai (Japan, 1951–)
- Hiroshi Kaneda (Japan, 1953–)
- Henry Kandrup (United States, 1955–2003)
- Jacobus Kapteyn (Netherlands, 1851–1922)
- Lyudmila Karachkina (Ukraine, 1948–)
- Ghiyath al-Kashi (Persia, 1380–1429)
- Karlis Kaufmanis (Latvia/United States, 1910–2003
- Kōyō Kawanishi (Japan, 1959–)
- Nobuhiro Kawasato (Japan)
- James Edward Keeler (United States, 1857–1900)
- Paul Kempf (Germany, 1856–1920)
- Johannes Kepler (Germany, 1571–1630)
- Omar Khayyám (Persia, 1048–1131)
- Al-Khujandi (Persia, 10th century)
- Muhammad ibn Mūsā al-Khwārizmī, (Persia, 780–850)
- Kidinnu (Babylon, 4th century BC; d. 330 BC?)
- Hisashi Kimura (Japan, 1870–1943)
- Maria Margarethe Kirch (Germany, 1670–1720)
- Daniel Kirkwood (United States, 1814–1895)
- Robert Kirshner (United States, 1949–)
- Minoru Kizawa (Japan, 1947–)
- Ernst Friedrich Wilhelm Klinkerfues (Germany, 1827–1884)
- Viktor Knorre (Russia, 1840–1919)
- Takao Kobayashi (Japan, 1961–)
- Toru Kobayashi (Japan)
- Luboš Kohoutek (1935–)
- Masahiro Koishikawa (Japan, 1952–2020)
- Nobuhisa Kojima (Japan, 1933–)
- Takuo Kojima (Japan, 1955–)
- Yoji Kondo (Japan, 1933–2017)
- Zdeněk Kopal (Czechoslovakia, United Kingdom, United States, 1914–1993)
- August Kopff (Germany, 1882–1960)
- Korado Korlević (Croatia, 1958–)
- Hiroki Kosai (Japan, 1933–)
- Charles T. Kowal (United States, 1940–2011)
- Robert Kraft (United States, 1927–2015)
- Ľubor Kresák (Czechoslovakia, 1927–1994)
- Heinrich Kreutz (Germany, 1854–1927)
- Kazuo Kubokawa (Japan, 1903–1943)
- Marc Kuchner (United States, 1972–)
- Gerard Kuiper (Netherlands, United States, 1905–1973)
- Donald Kurtz (1948–)
- Reiki Kushida (Japan)
- Yoshio Kushida (Japan, 1957–)
- György Kulin (Austria-Hungary, 1905–1989)

=== L ===
- Lagadha (India, 1st millennium BCE)
- Nicolas Louis de Lacaille (France, 1713–1762)
- Claes-Ingvar Lagerkvist (Sweden, 1944–)
- Joseph-Louis Lagrange (France, 1736–1813)
- Jérôme Lalande (France, 1732–1807)
- Johann Heinrich Lambert (France, Germany, 1728–1777)
- David J. Lane (Canada, 1983–)
- Andrew E. Lange (United States, 1957–2010)
- Samuel Pierpont Langley (United States, 1834–1906)
- Pierre-Simon Laplace (France, 1749–1827)
- Jacques Laskar (France, 1955–)
- William Lassell (United Kingdom, 1799–1880)
- Joseph Jean Pierre Laurent (France, fl. 1858)
- Henrietta Swan Leavitt (United States, 1868–1921)
- Typhoon Lee (United States and Taiwan, 1948–)
- Guillaume Le Gentil (France, 1725–1792)
- Georges Lemaître (Belgium, 1894–1966)
- Pierre Lemonnier (France, 1715–1799)
- Frederick C. Leonard (United States, 1896–1960)
- Armin Leuschner (US, 1868–1953)
- Geraint Lewis (Australia, 1969–)
- Urbain Le Verrier (France, 1811–1877)
- Li Fan (China, fl. 1st century AD)
- James Lind (UK, 1736–1812)
- Bertil Lindblad (Sweden, 1895–1965)
- Adolph Friedrich Lindemann (Germany/UK, 1846–1927)
- Chris Lintott (United Kingdom, 1980–)
- Joseph Johann Littrow (Austria, 1781–1840)
- Karl L. Littrow (Austria, 1811–1877)
- Liu Xin (China, fl. 1st century AD)
- Joseph Lockyer (United Kingdom, 1836–1920)
- Avi Loeb (Israel, USA 1962–)
- Maurice Loewy (Austria/France, 1833–1907)
- Christian Sørensen Longomontanus (Denmark, 1562–1647)
- Percival Lowell (United States, 1855–1916)
- Ángel López (Spain, 1955–)
- Álvaro López-García (Spain, 1941–2019)
- John William Lubbock (United Kingdom, 1803–1865)
- Knut Lundmark (Sweden, 1889–1958)
- Robert Luther (Germany, 1822–1900)
- Lupitus of Barcelona (Spain)
- Jane Luu (South Vietnam, United States 1965–)
- Willem Luyten (Dutch East Indies, Netherlands, 1899–1994)
- Donald Lynden-Bell (United Kingdom, 1935–2018)
- Andrew Lyne (UK, 1942–)
- Bernard Lyot (France, 1897–1952)

=== M ===
- Mahendra Suri (India, 14th century CE)
- Ma Yize (China, 910–1005)
- Adriaan van Maanen (United States, 1884–1946)
- George Parker, 2nd Earl of Macclesfield (United Kingdom, c. 1697–1764)
- Johann Heinrich von Mädler (Germany, 1794-1874)
- Amy Mainzer (United States, 1974–)
- Steve Mandel (United States)
- Geoff Marcy (United States, 1954–)
- Simon Marius (Germany, 1573–1624)
- Brian G. Marsden (United States, 1937–2010)
- Albert Marth (Germany, 1828–1897)
- Nevil Maskelyne (United Kingdom, 1732–1811)
- Charles Mason (United Kingdom, United States, 1730–1787)
- John C. Mather (United States, 1946–)
- Janet Akyüz Mattei (Turkey/United States, 1943–2004)
- Edward Walter Maunder (United Kingdom, 1851–1928)
- Pierre Louis Maupertuis (France, 1698–1759)
- Alain Maury (France, 1958–)
- Antonia Maury (United States, 1866–1952)
- Matthew Fontaine Maury (United States, 1806–1873)
- Brian May (United Kingdom, 1947–)
- Cornell Mayer (United States, 1922–2005)
- Tobias Mayer (Germany, 1723–1762)
- Michel Mayor (Switzerland, 1942–)
- Christopher McKee (United States, 1942–)
- Robert S. McMillan (United States)
- William H. McCrea (United Kingdom, 1904–1999)
- Bruce A. McIntosh (Canada, 1929–2015)
- Jess McIver (United States)
- Robert H. McNaught (Australia, 1956–)
- Pierre Méchain (France, 1744–1804)
- Thebe Medupe (South Africa, 1973–)
- Karen Jean Meech (United States, 1956–)
- Aden Baker Meinel (United States, 1922–2011)
- Marjorie Pettit Meinel (United States, 1922–2008)
- Fulvio Melia (United States, 1956–)
- Philibert Jacques Melotte (United Kingdom, 1880–1961)
- Paul Willard Merrill (United States, 1887–1961)
- David Merritt (United States)
- Charles Messier (France, 1730–1817)
- Joel Hastings Metcalf (United States, 1866–1925)
- Andreas Gerasimos Michalitsianos (United States, 1947–1997)
- John Michell (United Kingdom, 1724–1793)
- Elia Millosevich (Italy, 1848–1919)
- Edward Arthur Milne (United Kingdom, 1896–1950)
- Rudolph Minkowski (Germany, 1895–1976)
- Marcel Gilles Jozef Minnaert (Belgium, Netherlands, 1893–1970)
- Maria Mitchell (United States, 1818–1889)
- Seidai Miyasaka (Japan, 1955–)
- Yoshikane Mizuno (Japan, 1954–)
- August Ferdinand Möbius (Germany, 1790–1868)
- Anthony Moffat (Canada)
- Johan Maurits Mohr (Netherlands, 1716–1775)
- Samuel Molyneux (United Kingdom, 1689–1728)
- Geminiano Montanari (Italy, 1633–1687)
- Patrick Moore (United Kingdom, 1923–2012)
- James Michael Moran (United States, 1943–)
- William Wilson Morgan (United States, 1906–1994)
- Hiroshi Mori (Japan, 1958–)
- Amédée Mouchez (France, 1821–1892)
- Antonín Mrkos (Czechoslovakia, 1918–1996)
- Jean Mueller (United States, 1950–)
- Masaru Mukai (Japan, 1949–)
- Christiaan Alexander Muller (Netherlands, 1923-2004)
- Gustav Müller (Germany, 1851–1925)
- Johannes Müller (Germany, 1436–1476)
- Carole Mundell (United Kingdom)
- Harutaro Murakami (Japan, 1872–1947)
- Osamu Muramatsu (Japan, 1949–)
- Tara Murphy (Australia)
- bin Musa, Ahmad (Persia, 805–873)
- bin Musa, Hasan (Persia, 810–873)
- bin Musa, Muhammad (Persia, (800–873)
- Nils Mustelin (Finland, 1931–2004)

=== N ===
- Nilakantha Somayaji (India, 1444–1544)
- Valentin Naboth (Germany, Italy, 1523–1593)
- Naburimannu (Babylonia, sometime between 6th century BC and 2nd century BC)
- Takeshi Nagata (Japan, 1913–1991)
- Ahmad Nahavandi (Persia, 7th–8th century)
- Akimasa Nakamura (Japan, 1961–)
- Syuichi Nakano (Japan, 1947–)
- Jayant Narlikar (India, 1938–)
- Naubakht (Persia, d. 776)
- Al-fadl ibn Naubakht (Persia, 8th century)
- Otto Neugebauer (Germany, United States, 1899–1990)
- Grigoriy Nikolaevich Neujmin (Russia, 1886–1946)
- Simon Newcomb (United States, 1835–1909)
- Isaac Newton (United Kingdom, 1643–1727)
- Seth Barnes Nicholson (United States, 1891–1963)
- Albertus Antonie Nijland (Netherlands, 1868–1936)
- Tsuneo Niijima (Japan, 1955–)
- Peter Nilson (Sweden, 1937–1998)
- Hōei Nojiri (Japan, 1885–1977)
- Jaime Nomen (Spain, 1960–)
- Toshiro Nomura (Japan, 1954–)

=== O ===
- Knut Jørgen Røed Ødegaard (Norway, 1966–)
- Okuro Oikawa (Japan, 1896–1970)
- Tarmo Oja (Sweden, 1934–2024)
- Tomimaru Okuni (Japan, 1931–)
- Nicolaus Olahus (Hungarian, 1493–1568)
- Heinrich Wilhelm Matthias Olbers (Germany, 1758–1840)
- Gerard O'Neill (United States, 1927–1992)
- Jan Hendrik Oort (Netherlands, 1900–1992)
- Pieter Oosterhoff (Netherlands, 1904–1978)
- Ernst Öpik (Estonia, Ireland, 1893–1985)
- José Luis Ortiz Moreno (Spain, 1967–)
- Yoshiaki Oshima (Japan, 1952–)
- Donald Edward Osterbrock, United States, 1924–2007)
- Liisi Oterma (Finland, 1915–2001)
- Satoru Otomo (Japan, 1957–)
- Jean Abraham Chrétien Oudemans (Netherlands, 1827–1906)

=== P ===
- Rafael Pacheco (Spain, 1954–)
- Bohdan Paczyński (Poland, 1940–2007)
- Ľudmila Pajdušáková (Czechoslovakia, 1916–1979)
- Johann Palisa (Austria, 1848–1925)
- Johann Palitzsch (Germany, 1723–1788)
- Anton Pannekoek (Netherlands, 1873–1960)
- Eugene Parker (United States, 1927–2022)
- George Parker, 2nd Earl of Macclesfield (United Kingdom, c. 1697–1764)
- William Parsons, Lord Rosse (Ireland, 1800–1867)
- André Patry (France, 1902–1960)
- Cecilia Payne-Gaposchkin (United Kingdom, United States, 1900–1979)
- Ruby Payne-Scott (Australia, 1912–1981)
- Jean-Claude Pecker (France, 1923–2020)
- James Peebles (Canada, United States, 1935–)
- Sir Cuthbert Peek, 2nd Baronet (UK, 1855–1901)
- Manuel Peimbert (Mexico, 1941–)
- Leslie Copus Peltier (United States, 1900–1980)
- Roger Penrose (United Kingdom, 1931–)
- Arno Penzias (United States, Germany, 1933–2024)
- Luboš Perek (Czech Republic, 1919–2020)
- Saul Perlmutter (United States, 1959–)
- Charles Dillon Perrine (United States, Argentina, 1867–1951)
- Henri Joseph Anastase Perrotin (France, 1845–1904)
- Christian Heinrich Friedrich Peters (Germany, United States, 1813–1890)
- George Henry Peters (United States, 1863–1947)
- Mark M. Phillips (United States, 1951–)
- Giuseppe Piazzi (Italy, 1746–1826)
- Edward Charles Pickering (United States, 1846–1919)
- William Henry Pickering (United States, 1858–1938)
- Phil Plait (United States, 1964–)
- Giovanni Antonio Amedeo Plana (Italy, 1781–1864)
- Petrus Plancius (Netherlands, 1552–1622)
- John Stanley Plaskett (Canada, 1865–1941)
- Norman Robert Pogson (United Kingdom, 1829–1891)
- Christian Pollas (France, 1947–)
- John Pond (England, 1767–1836)
- Jean-Louis Pons (France, 1761–1831)
- Carolyn Porco (United States, 1953–)
- Vladimír Porubčan (Czechoslovakia, 1940–)
- Charles Pritchard (United Kingdom, 1808–1893)
- Richard Proctor (England, 1837–1888)
- Milorad B. Protić (Serbia, 1911– 2001)
- Antoni Przybylski (Poland, Australia, 1913–1985)
- Ptolemy of Alexandria (Roman Egypt, c. 85–165)
- Pierre Puiseux (France, 1855–1928)
- Georg Purbach (Germany, 1423–1461)
- Pythagoras of Samos (Greece, 580 BC–500 BC)
- Paris Pişmiş (Armenia/Mexico, 1911–1999)

=== Q ===
- Adolphe Quetelet (Belgium, 1796–1874)
- Ali Qushji (Ottoman, 1403–1474)
- M. Shahid Qureshi (Pakistan)

=== R ===
- David Lincoln Rabinowitz (United States, 1960–)
- Grote Reber (United States, 1911–2002)
- Martin Rees (United Kingdom, 1942–)
- Hubert Reeves (Canada, 1932–)
- Regiomontanus (Johannes Müller) (Germany, 1436–1476)
- Julius Reichelt (Germany, 1637–1717)
- Erasmus Reinhold (Prussia, Germany, 1511–1553)
- Karl Reinmuth (Germany, 1892–1979)
- Pieter Johannes van Rhijn (Netherlands, 1886–1960)
- Giovanni Battista Riccioli (Italy, 1598–1671)
- Mercedes Richards (Jamaica, 1955–2016)
- Jean Richer (France, 1630–1696)
- Edward Riddle (England, 1788–1854)
- Adam Riess (United States, 1969–)
- Fernand Rigaux (Belgium, 1905–1962)
- George Willis Ritchey (United States, 1864–1945)
- David Rittenhouse (United States, 1732–1796)
- Hans-Walter Rix (Germany, 1964–)
- Arjen Roelofs (Netherlands, 1754–1824)
- Nancy G. Roman (United States, 1925–2018)
- Elizabeth Roemer (United States, 1929–2016)
- Gustavo E. Romero (Argentina, (1964–)
- Roger of Hereford (England, c. 1176–1198)
- Ole Christensen Rømer (Denmark, 1644–1710)
- Otto A. Rosenberger (Germany, 1800–1890)
- Svein Rosseland (Norway, 1894–1985)
- Bruno Rossi (Italy, 1905–1993)
- Marta Graciela Rovira (Argentina)
- Vera Rubin (United States, 1928–2016)
- Henry Chamberlain Russell (Australia, 1836–1907)
- Henry Norris Russell (United States, 1877–1957)
- Martin Ryle (United Kingdom, 1918–1984)

=== S ===
- Sir Edward Sabine (Ireland, 1788–1883)
- Carl Sagan (United States, 1934–1996)
- Megh Nad Saha (India, 1893–1956)
- Edwin Ernest Salpeter (Austria, Australia, United States, 1924–2008)
- Allan Rex Sandage (United States, 1926–2010)
- Hendricus Gerardus van de Sande Bakhuyzen (Netherlands, 1838–1923)
- Wallace Leslie William Sargent (United Kingdom, United States, 1935–2012)
- Anneila Sargent (United Kingdom, United States, 1942–)
- Naoto Sato (Japan, 1953–)
- Alexandre Schaumasse (France, 1882–1958)
- Giovanni Schiaparelli (Italy, 1835–1910)
- Frank Schlesinger (United States, 1871–1943)
- Bernhard Schmidt (Estonia, Sweden, Germany, 1879–1935)
- Brian P. Schmidt (United States, 1967–)
- Maarten Schmidt (Netherlands, 1929–)
- Robert Schommer (United States, 1946–2001)
- Johann Hieronymus Schröter (Germany, 1745–1816)
- Lipót Schulhof (Hungary, 1847–1921)
- Heinrich Christian Schumacher (Germany, 1780–1850)
- Hans-Emil Schuster (Germany, 1934–)
- Samuel Heinrich Schwabe (Germany, 1789–1875)
- Karl Schwarzschild (Germany, 1873–1916)
- Martin Schwarzschild (Germany, United States, 1912–1997)
- Friedrich Karl Arnold Schwassmann (Germany, 1870–1964)
- James Vernon Scotti (United States, 1960–)
- Frederick Hanley Seares (United States, 1873–1964)
- George Mary Searle (United States, 1839–1918)
- Angelo Secchi (Italy, 1818–1878)
- Sadao Sei (Japan)
- Waltraut Seitter (Germany, 1930–2007)
- Tsutomu Seki (Japan, 1930–)
- Carl Keenan Seyfert (United States, 1911–1960)
- Grigory Abramovich Shajn (Russia, 1892–1956)
- Pelageya Fedorovna Shajn (Russia, 1894–1956)
- Harlow Shapley (United States, 1885–1972)
- Richard Sheepshanks (United Kingdom, 1794–1855)
- Shen Kuo (China, 1031–1035)
- Shi Shen (China, fl. 4th century BC)
- Shibukawa Shunkai (Japan, 1639–1715)
- Yoshisada Shimizu (Japan, 1943–)
- Shinzo Shinjo (Japan, 1873–1938)
- Qutb eddin Shirazi (Persia, 1236–1311)
- Iosif Samuilovich Shklovsky (Russia, 1916–1985)
- Vladimir Shkodrov (Bulgaria, 1930–2010)
- Carolyn Jean Spellmann Shoemaker (United States, 1929–2021)
- Eugene Merle Shoemaker (United States, 1928–1997)
- Seth Shostak (United States, 1943–)
- Andrew Siemion (United States, 1980–)
- Willem de Sitter (Netherlands, 1872–1934)
- Charlotte Moore Sitterly (United States, 1898–1990)
- Brian A. Skiff (United States)
- John Francis Skjellerup (Australia, South Africa, 1875–1952)
- Vesto Melvin Slipher (United States, 1875–1969)
- William Marshall Smart (United Kingdom, 1889–1975)
- Tamara Mikhaylovna Smirnova (Russia, 1935–2001)
- George Smoot (United States, 1945–)
- William Henry Smyth (United Kingdom, 1788–1865)
- Willebrord Snellius (Netherlands, 1580–1626)
- Mary Fairfax Somerville (United Kingdom, 1780–1872)
- Sir James South (United Kingdom, 1785–1867)
- Sir Harold Spencer Jones (United Kingdom, 1890–1960)
- Lyman Spitzer (United States, 1914–1997)
- Friederich Wilhelm Gustav Spörer (Germany, 1822–1895)
- Rainer Spurzem (Germany, 1956–)
- Anton Staus (Germany, 1872–1955)
- Joel Stebbins (United States, 1878–1966)
- Milan Rastislav Štefánik (Czechoslovakia, 1880-1919)
- Johan Stein (Netherlands, 1871–1951)
- Karl August von Steinheil, (Germany, 1801–1870)
- Édouard Stephan (France, 1837–1923)
- Denise Stephens (United States)
- Charles Bruce Stephenson (United States, 1929–2001))
- David J. Stevenson (New Zealand, 1948–)
- Edward James Stone (1831–1897)
- F. J. M. Stratton (United Kingdom, 1881–1960)
- Bengt Georg Daniel Strömgren (Denmark, 1908–1987)
- Friedrich Georg Wilhelm (von) Struve (Germany, Russia, 1793–1864)
- Karl Hermann Struve (Russia, Germany, 1854–1920)
- Gustav Wilhelm Ludwig Struve (Russia, 1858–1920)
- Otto Struve (Russia, United States, 1897–1963)
- Otto Wilhelm (von) Struve (Russia, 1819–1905)
- Su Song (China, 1020–1101)
- Abd Al-Rahman Al Sufi (Persia, 903–986)
- Matsuo Sugano (Japan, 1939–)
- Atsushi Sugie (Japan)
- Nicholas Suntzeff (United States, 1952–)
- Rashid Alievich Sunyaev (Uzbekistan Russia Germany, 1943–)
- Shohei Suzuki (Japan)
- Lewis A. Swift (United States, 1820–1913)
- Frédéric Sy (France)

=== T ===
- Akihiko Tago (Japan, 1932–)
- Atsushi Takahashi (Japan, 1965–)
- Kesao Takamizawa (Japan, 1952–)
- Jill Tarter (United States, 1944–)
- Joseph Hooton Taylor Jr. (United States, 1941–)
- John Tebbutt (Australia, 1834–1916)
- Ernst Wilhelm Leberecht Tempel (Germany, 1821–1889)
- Thabit ibn Qurra (Iraq, 826–901)
- Thorvald Nicolai Thiele (Denmark, 1838–1910)
- Louis Thollon (France, 1829–1887)
- Norman G. Thomas (United States, 1930–2020)
- John Thome (United States, Argentina, 1843–1908)
- Kip Stephen Thorne (United States, 1940–)
- Friedrich Tietjen (Germany, 1834–1895)
- Beatrice Muriel Hill Tinsley (New Zealand, United States, 1941–1981)
- François Félix Tisserand (France, 1845–1896)
- Johann Daniel Titius (Germany, 1729–1796)
- Yasuo Tanaka (Japan, 1931–2018)
- Clyde Tombaugh (United States, 1906–1997)
- Kōichirō Tomita (Japan, 1925–2006)
- Richard Tousey (United States, 1908–1997)
- Charles Townes (United States, 1915–2015)
- Virginia Trimble (United States, 1943–)
- Chad Trujillo (United States, 1973–)
- Robert Julius Trumpler (United States, 1886–1956)
- R. Brent Tully (United States, 1943–)
- Herbert Hall Turner (England, 1861–1930)
- Nasir al-Din Tusi (Persia, 1201–1274)
- Horace Parnell Tuttle (United States, 1839–1923)
- Neil deGrasse Tyson (United States, 1958–)

=== U ===
- Seiji Ueda (Japan, 1952–)
- Ulugh Beg (Uzbekistan, 1394–1449)
- Antonio de Ulloa (Spain), 1716–1795)
- Anne Barbara Underhill (Canada, 1920–2003)
- Albrecht Unsöld (Germany, 1905–1995)
- Takeshi Urata (Japan, 1947–2012)
- Mu’ayyad al-Din al-’Urdi (Persia d. 1266)
- Fumiaki Uto (Japan)

=== V ===
- Yrjö Väisälä (Finland, 1891–1971)
- Benjamin Valz (France, 1787–1867)
- James Van Allen (United States, 1914–2006)
- George Van Biesbroeck (Belgium, United States, 1880–1974)
- Hendrik Christoffel van de Hulst (Netherlands, 1918–2000)
- Peter van de Kamp (United States, 1901–1995)
- Sidney van den Bergh (Canada, 1929–)
- Martin van den Hove (Netherlands, 1605–1639)
- Hendricus Gerardus van de Sande Bakhuyzen (Netherlands, 1838–1923)
- Hendrik van Gent (Netherlands, South Africa, 1900–1947)
- Cornelis Johannes van Houten (Netherlands, 1920–2002)
- Pieter Johannes van Rhijn (Netherlands, 1886–1960)
- Gérard de Vaucouleurs (France, United States, 1918–1995)
- Zdeňka Vávrová (Czechoslovakia, 1945–)
- Jean-Pierre Verdet (France, 1932–)
- Philippe Véron (France, 1939–2014)
- Frank Washington Very (United States, 1852–1927)
- Yvon Villarceau (France, 1813–1883)
- Julie Vinter Hansen (Denmark), 1890–1960)
- Hermann Carl Vogel (Germany, 1841–1907)
- Friedrich Georg Wilhelm von Struve (Germany, Russia, 1793–1864)
- Otto Wilhelm von Struve (Russia, 1819–1905)
- Alexander N. Vyssotsky (Russia/United States, 1888–1973)
- Emma Vyssotsky (United States, 1894–1975)

=== W ===
- Arno Arthur Wachmann (Germany, 1902–1990)
- Abul Wáfa (Persia, 940–997/998)
- Walcher of Malvern (England d. 1135)
- George Wallerstein (1930–2021)
- William Wales (United Kingdom, c. 1734–1798)
- Dennis Walsh (United Kingdom, 1933–2005)
- Qingde Wang (United States/China)
- Brian Warner (astronomer) (United Kingdom, 1939–)
- Brian D. Warner (United States, 1952–)
- Kazuro Watanabe (Japan, 1955–)
- James Craig Watson (United States, 1838–1880)
- Edmund Weaver (United Kingdom, 1663–1748)
- Kim Weaver (United States, 1969–)
- Thomas William Webb (United Kingdom, 1807–1885)
- Rachel Webster (Australia, 1951–)
- Alfred Lothar Wegener (Germany, 1880–1930)
- Gary A. Wegner (United States, 1944–)
- Wei Pu (China, 960–1279)
- Karl von Weizsäcker (Germany, 1912–2007)
- Godefroy Wendelin (Belgium, 1580–1667)
- Richard M. West (Denmark, 1941–)
- Gart Westerhout (Netherlands, United States, 1927–2012)
- Bengt Westerlund (Sweden, 1921–2008)
- J. G. Westphal (Germany, 1824–1859)
- Johann Heinrich Westphal (Germany, Italy, 1794–1831)
- George Wetherill (1925–2006)
- John Archibald Wheeler (United States, 1911–2008)
- Fred Lawrence Whipple (United States, 1906–2004)
- Albert Whitford (United States, 1905–2002)
- Mary Watson Whitney (United States, 1847–1921)
- Chandra Wickramasinghe (United Kingdom, 1939–)
- Paul Wild (Switzerland, 1925–2014)
- Olin C. Wilson (United States, 1909–1994)
- Ida E. Woods (United States, 1870–1940)
- Robert Wilson (United States, 1936–)
- Rogier Windhorst (United States, 1955–)
- Vincent Wing (UK, 1619–1668)
- Anna Winlock (United States, 1857–1904)
- Henry "Trae" Winter (United States, 1972)
- John Winthrop (Massachusetts Bay Colony, 1714–1779)
- Friedrich August Theodor Winnecke (Germany, 1835–1897)
- Carl Wirtanen (United States, 1910–1990)
- Jack Wisdom (United States, 1953–)
- Gustav Witt (Germany, 1866–1946)
- Maximilian Wolf (Germany, 1863–1932)
- Aleksander Wolszczan (Poland, 1946–)
- Edith Jones Woodward (United States), (1914–2002)
- Richard van der Riet Woolley (United Kingdom, 1906–1986)
- Frances Woodworth Wright (United States, 1897–1989)
- Thomas Wright (United Kingdom, 1711–1786)
- Gillian Wright (United Kingdom)
- Arthur Bambridge Wyse (United States, 1909–1942)

=== Y ===
- Issei Yamamoto (Japan, 1889–1959)
- Masayuki Yanai (Japan, 1959–)
- Yi Xing (China, 683–727)
- Anne Sewell Young (United States, 1871–1961)
- Charles Augustus Young (United States, 1834–1908)
- James Whitney Young (United States, 1941–)
- Judith Young (United States, 1952–2014)

=== Z ===
- Franz Xaver von Zach (Germany, 1753–1832)
- Abraham Zacuto (Spain/Portugal, 1450–1510)
- John Zarnecki (UK, 1949–)
- Yakov Borisovich Zel'dovich (USSR, 1914–1987)
- Zhang Daqing (China, 1969–)
- Zhang Heng (China, 78–139)
- Zhang Yuzhe (China, 1902–1986)
- Lyudmila Vasil'evna Zhuravleva (Russia/Ukraine, 1946–)
- Felix Ziegel (Soviet Union, 1920–1988)
- Zu Chongzhi (China, 429–500)
- Fritz Zwicky (Switzerland, United States, 1898–1974)

== Others who influenced astronomy and astrophysics ==
The following is a list of people who are not astronomers but made a contribution to the field of astronomy and astrophysics.

- Hans Bethe (1906–2005), (physicist)
- Niels Bohr (1885–1962), (physicist)
- Andreas Cellarius (Netherlands, Germany, 1596–1665), (cartographer)
- Freeman Dyson (1923–2020), (physicist)
- Albert Einstein (1879–1955), (physicist)
- Karl Guthe Jansky (United States, 1905–1950), (radio astronomer)
- James Clerk Maxwell (United Kingdom, 1831–1879), (physicist)
- Thomas Young (United Kingdom, 1773–1829), (physicist)
- Abdus Salam (1926–1996), (physicist)
- Riazuddin (1936–2013), (physicist)

== See also ==
- List of astronomical instrument makers
- List of women astronomers
- List of Russian astronomers and astrophysicists
- List of women in leadership positions on astronomical instrumentation projects
