= Jacob ben Isaac Corsono =

Spanish astronomer

Jacob ben Isaac al-Corsono or Carsono or Carsi (also Abu Ishaq Ya'qub ibn Ishaq ibn Ya'qub, known as Ibn al-Qursunuh) was a Spanish astronomer of the fourteenth century.

He was commissioned by King Peter IV of Aragon to translate from Catalan into Hebrew the astronomical tables known as The Tables of Don Pedro, which, at Don Pedro's command, had been begun by Maestre Piero Gilebert, and finished by Gilebert's pupil, Dalmacio de Planis.

About 1376 Carsono wrote at Seville a treatise in Arabic on the astrolabe. This he himself translated into Hebrew at Barcelona in 1378. Chayyim ibn Musa ascribes kabbalistic miracles to Carsono.
