= Cornell Mayer =

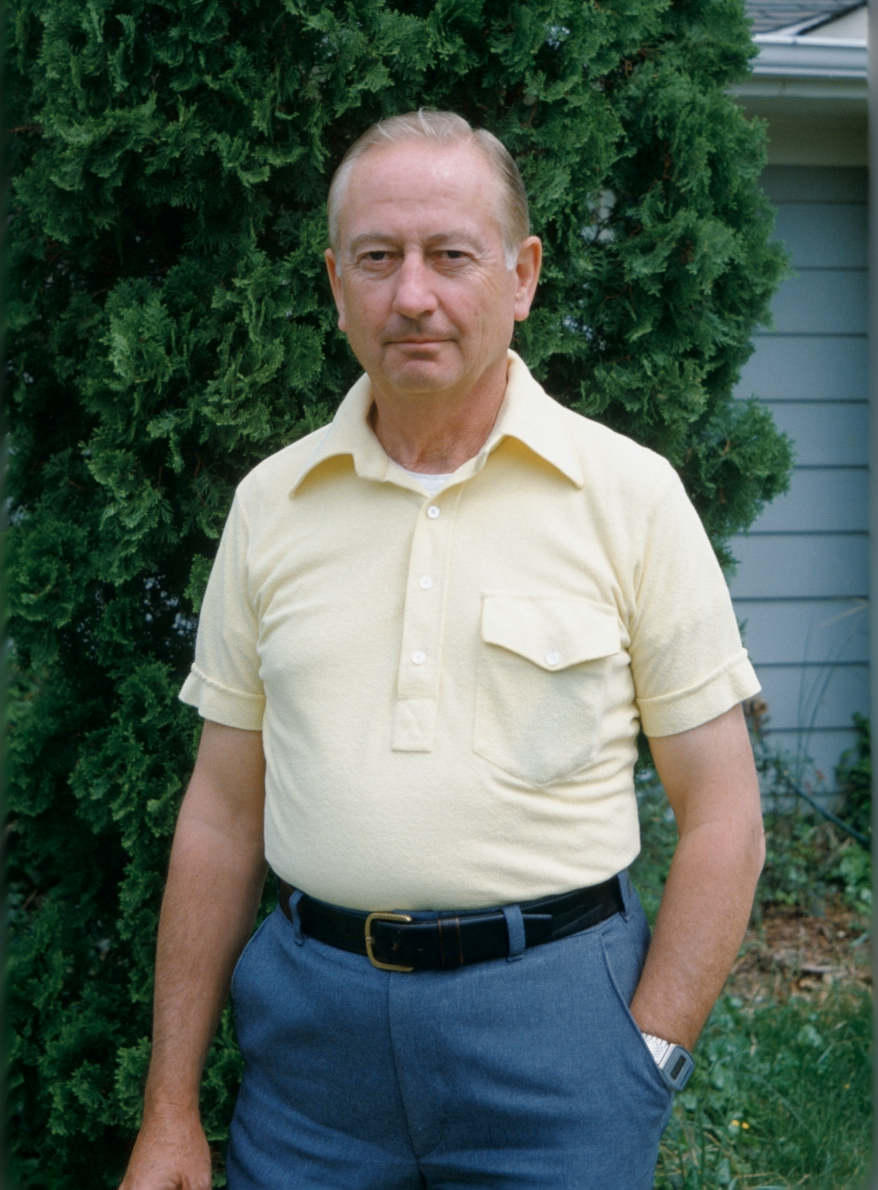
- Mayer in 1983
- Born: 10 December 1921; Ossian, Iowa, United States
- Died: 19 November 2005 (aged 83); Virginia, United States
- Education: University of Maryland, College Park (MA)
- Spouse: Carey
- Children: John and Carolyn
- Parent(s): Earle Scofidio; June Matthews

Cornell Henry Mayer (10 December 1921 – 19 November 2005) was a radio astronomer, who was the first to accurately measure the temperature of Venus by measuring the planet's thermal radiation.

== Biography ==
He was born on 10 December 1921 in Ossian, Iowa. Mayer graduated from the University of Iowa in 1943. During World War II, he served in the US Navy at the US Naval Research Laboratory where he worked on the first submarine periscope radar. He received a Master's degree from the University of Maryland, College Park in 1951 studying electrical engineering. He died on 19 November 2005 of congestive heart failure at his home in Virginia.

== Career highlights ==
- Returned to the NRL, he used the 50 ft (15m) radio telescope for his earlier work.
- In 1958, publication of microwave measurements of Venus raised the possibility that the surface of the planet was extremely hot. It triggered an international effort to measure and analyze the microwave spectrum of Venus.
- After the measurements of Venus, Mayer measured the surface temperature of Mars and atmospheric temperature of Jupiter.
- The 1964 winner of the Nobel Prize in Physics, Charles H. Townes, shared his prize money with Mayer, who had been a collaborator in studying planetary thermal radiation.
- A career highlight was the award of the Navy Superior Civilian Service Award in 1969.
- He wrote more than 75 scientific articles.
- Isaac Asimov quoted Mayer extensively in The Secret of the Universe.
- Mayer spent his entire 36-year career at the NRL and became the head of radio astronomy branch, retiring in 1980.
