= Saul Adelman =

American astronomer

Saul Joseph Adelman (born 18 November 1944, in Atlantic City) is an astronomer at The Citadel's Physics Department in Charleston, South Carolina. Adelman received his bachelor's degree in physics from the University of Maryland in 1966 and his PhD in astronomy from the California Institute of Technology in 1972. He specializes in stellar astronomy. He is a co-author of Bound for the Stars: Travel in the Solar System and Beyond (1981, ISBN 0-13-080382-0). In addition, he is the author/co-author of 502 scholarly articles in Astronomy.
