= Sadao Sei =

Japanese astronomer

Minor planets discovered: 1
2909 Hoshi-no-ie	9 May 1983	MPC

Sadao Sei (清 貞雄, Sei Sadao) is a Japanese astronomer who discovered an asteroid in 1983.

He is credited by the Minor Planet Center with the discovery of 2909 Hoshi-no-ie, a main-belt asteroid of the Eos family, which he named after his observatory. The meaning of "Hoshi-no-ie" is "a star house". Naming citation was published on 17 February 1984 (M.P.C. 8544).
