= Hayyim ben Judah ibn Musa =

Jewish physician and apologist

Hayyim ben Judah ibn Musa was a Jewish physician, chemist, astronomer, and apologist who contended with Nicholas de Lyra. He was born in 1380 in Béjar, near Salamanca and died in 1460. His main work is Magen va-Romah (Shield and sword), in which he criticised Christianity.
