= Julius Reichelt =

German mathematician and astronomer (1637–1717)

Julius Reichelt (5 January 1637 – 19 February 1717) was a German mathematician and astronomer who may have set up the first observatory in the city of Strasbourg.

== Biography ==
Julius Reichelt was born on 5 January 1637 in the city of Strasbourg. In 1644 at the age of 16 he was enrolled as a student and graduated as Doctor of Philosophy in 1660. He was nominated as Professor of Mathematics in 1667. Reichelt traveled through Northern Europe some time after 1666 and met other notable 17th-century scientists and thinkers such as Jan Hudde, Johannes Hevelius, Andreas Concius, Henrik Ruse, Johannes Meyer, Rasmus Bartholin, and Adam Olearius. After his return from his trip Reichelt may have proposed the building of the "turret lantern" as an astronomical observatory at the top of Strasbourg's Hospital Gate based on the Rundetårn (Round Tower) he saw in Copenhagen. Reichelt died in Strasbourg on 19 February 1717.
