= Yoshiaki Banno =

Japanese astronomer (1952–1991)

Minor planets discovered: 1
4200 Shizukagozen^{[A]}	28 November 1983	MPC
^{A} co-discovered with Takeshi Urata

Yoshiaki Banno (番野 善明, Banno Yoshiaki, 1952–1991) was a Japanese astronomer and co-discover of 4200 Shizukagozen, an asteroid of the main-belt.

Banno is considered to be one of Japan's pioneering amateur astronomer. He died in a traffic accident in 1991. The main-belt asteroid 3394 Banno was named in his memory on 10 November 1992 (M.P.C. 21130).
