= Bengt Gustafsson (astronomer) =

Swedish astronomer (born 1943)

- Born: 18 July 1943 (age 83)

Academic work
- Discipline: astronomy
- Sub-discipline: theoretical astrophysics
- Institutions: Uppsala University

Bengt Gustafsson (born 18 July 1943) is a Swedish astronomer and emeritus professor in theoretical astrophysics at Uppsala University.

He is known for his work in uniting cosmic science with culture and theology, and questioning space science from a humanistic point of view. Gustafsson received an honorary doctorate from the Faculty of Theology at Uppsala University in 2000. In 2002, Gustafsson was awarded the grand prize of the Royal Institute of Technology, and has also been awarded the grand prize of Längmanska kulturfonden. At one point during his career, he was a counselor working for the government of Sweden.

He is a member of the Norwegian Academy of Science and Letters.
