= Philippe Véron =

French astronomer (1939–2014)

Philippe Véron (2 March 1939 – 7 August 2014) was a French astronomer. He worked at the Observatoire de Haute Provence, where he was director from 1985 to 1994.

He studied the variability and statistics of quasars, as well as elliptical galaxies. He was married to French astronomer Marie-Paule Véron-Cetty. Together with her, he compiled and maintained the Veron-Cetty Catalog of Quasars and Active Galactic Nuclei, whose thirteenth edition was published in 2010.

At the time of his death, he was working on the Dictionnaire des Astronomes Français 1850–1950 (Dictionary of French Astronomers 1850–1950), which is a biographical encyclopedia. It is unpublished but is available online in PDF form at http://www.obs-hp.fr/dictionnaire.

Asteroid 5260 Philvéron is named after him.
