= Li Fan (Han dynasty) =

Chinese astronomer

Li Fan (Chinese: 李梵; pinyin: Lǐ Fàn) was a Chinese astronomer during the Han dynasty (202 BC – 220 AD).

He noticed that the Moon does not move uniformly through its phases by using background stars as reference. In 85 Li Fan and Bian Xin (Chinese: 編訢) were tasked by Emperor Zhang to resolve inaccuracies in the Taichu calendar. He is also known to have worked with inflow clepsydras as opposed to earlier, typically less accurate outflow clepsydras.

The measurements of synodic periods of the planets given in the following table are attributed to him.

Comparison of Li Fan's values for the synodic periods of the planets
Planet	True value (days)	Li Fan's value (days)
Mercury	115.877	115.881
Venus	583.921	584.024
Mars	779.936	779.532
Jupiter	398.884	398.846
Saturn	378.092	378.059

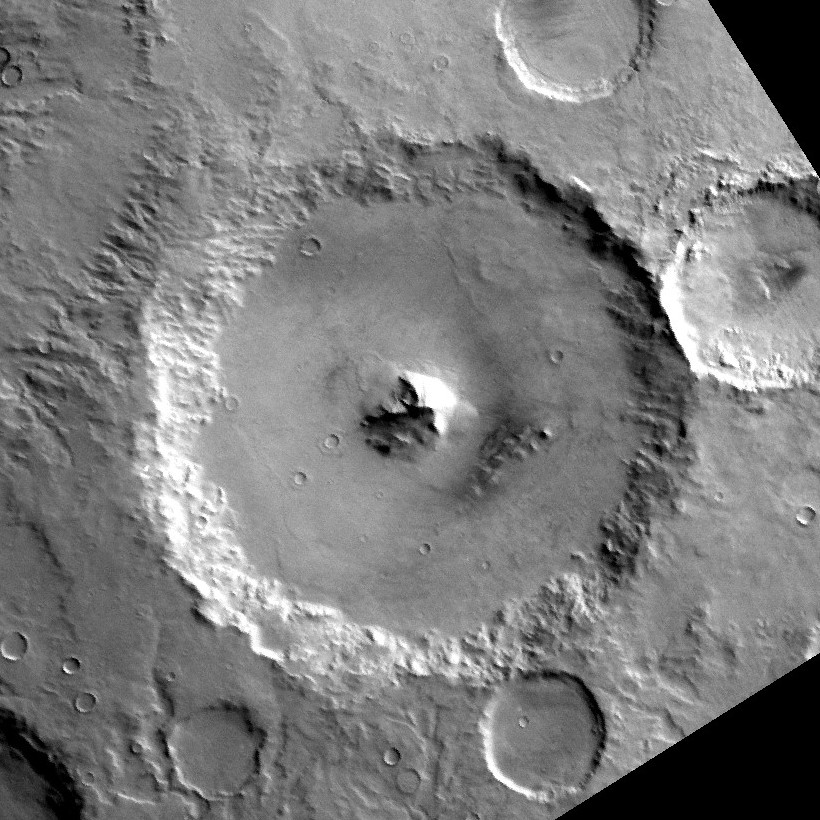
Li Fan crater on Mars (picture by Viking 1)

An impact crater that is located at the Phaethontis quadrangle, Mars, 47.2°S Latitude and 153.2°W Longitude was named in his honor. The diameter of the impact crater is approximately 104.8 km.
