= Bruce A. McIntosh =

Bruce A. McIntosh (October 30, 1929 – February 15, 2015) was a Canadian astrophysicist who worked at the Herzberg Institute of Astrophysics, National Research Council of Canada, Ottawa, Ontario.

His main area of research was meteors and asteroids. He was awarded the Czech Academy of Sciences gold medal for joint research on meteors with the Czechs. The Radar Meteor Survey he carried out with Peter Millman remains the benchmark to this day.

A main belt asteroid was named after him in 1988. Its proper name is 5061 McIntosh (1988 DJ) and has an absolute magnitude of 12.4.
