= Eric F. Bell =

American astronomer

- Education: Glasgow University (BSc); Durham University (PhD)
- Scientific career
- Fields: Observational astronomy
- Thesis: Exploring the star formation histories of galaxies (1999)
- Doctoral advisor: Richard Bower and Bernard Rauscher
- Website: sites.lsa.umich.edu/ericbell/

Eric Findlay Bell is the Arthur F. Thurnau Professor of Astronomy at the University of Michigan.

Formerly a staff scientist at the Max Planck Institute for Astronomy, Bell was a 2007 awardee of the Heinz Maier-Leibnitz-Prize from the German Research Foundation for his work on galaxy formation.

He was part of the team that discovered Andromeda XXXV, a satellite galaxy of Andromeda, in 2025.

== Selected publications ==
- Bell, E. F.; de Jong, R. S. (2001). "Stellar mass-to-light ratios and the Tully–Fisher relation". The Astrophysical Journal. 550 (1): 212–229. arXiv:astro-ph/0011493.
- ———; McIntosh, D. H.; Katz, N.; Weinberg, M. D. (2003). "The Optical and Near-Infrared Properties of Galaxies: I. Luminosity and Stellar Mass Functions". The Astrophysical Journal Supplement Series. 149 (2): 289–312. arXiv:astro-ph/0302543.
- ———; Wolf, C.; Meisenheimer, K.; Rix, H.-W.; Borch, A.; Dye, S.; Kleinheinrich, M.; Wisotzki, L.; McIntosh, D. H. (2004). "Nearly 5000 Distant Early-Type Galaxies in COMBO-17: a Red Sequence and its Evolution since z~1". The Astrophysical Journal. 608 (2): 752–767. arXiv:astro-ph/0303394.
- ———; Zucker, D. B.; Belokurov, V.; Sharma, S.; Johnston, K. V.; Bullock, J. S.; Hogg, D. W.; Jahnke, K.; de Jong, J. T. A.; Beers, T. C.; Evans, N. W. (2008). "The accretion origin of the Milky Way's stellar halo". The Astrophysical Journal. 680 (1): 295–311. arXiv:0706.0004.
