= Donald Kurtz =

American astronomer

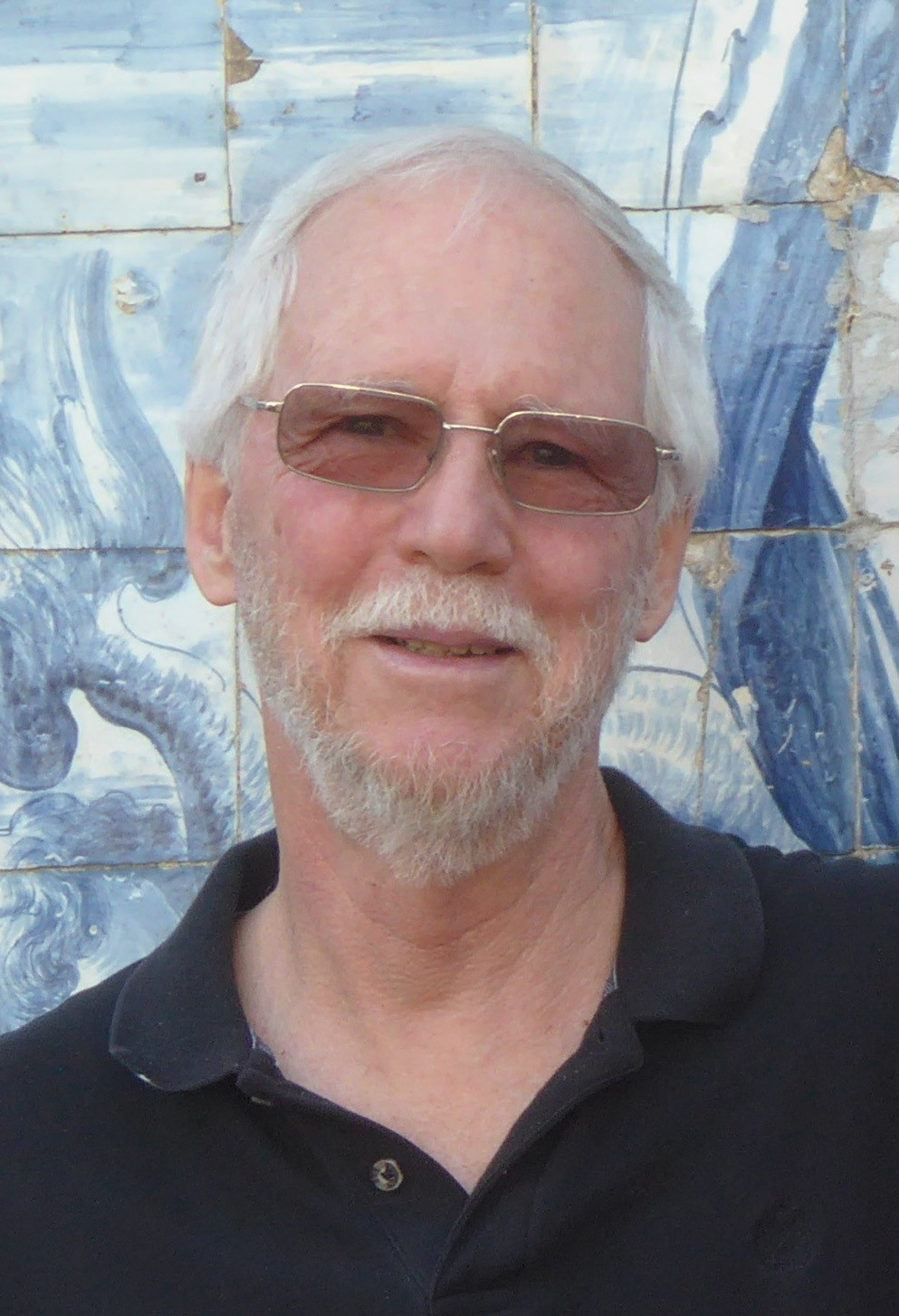
- Don Kurtz in 2021
- Education: University of Texas
- Known for: Asteroseismology
- Scientific career
- Fields: Astronomy
- Workplaces: University of Cape Town, University of Central Lancashire, North-West University, University of Lincoln

Donald Wayne Kurtz (born 1948) is an astronomer known for his research into asteroseismology. He completed his PhD in astronomy at the University of Texas in 1976 before moving to Cape Town, where he became a professor at the University of Cape Town. In 2001, after 25 years in South Africa, he moved to the United Kingdom where he taught at the University of Central Lancashire till 2020 and is now an emeritus professor at UCLan. In 2020 Don was appointed Extraordinary Professor at North-West University (NWU) and became a Visiting Professor of Astrophysics at the University of Lincoln. Don is a past councillor and Vice-President of the Royal Astronomical Society and has served as President of Commission 27 of the International Astronomical Union (IAU) and on many international committees.

Don Kurtz is best known for discovering oscillations in what is now known as rapidly-oscillating Ap (roAp) stars, but has made many contributions to the study of oscillating stars and was President of the International Astronomical Union Commission on Variable Stars. He is also well-known in his field for his public presentations and his advice to scientists on how to present their research well. His regular live on-line Q&A sessions known as Astro-Chats with professor Don Kurtz, organised by the University of Lincoln, are attracting hundreds of attendees.

Professor Kurtz is a recipient of the Royal Astronomical Society’s 2022 Service Award.
