= Hōei Nojiri =

Japanese essayist and astronomer (1885–1977)

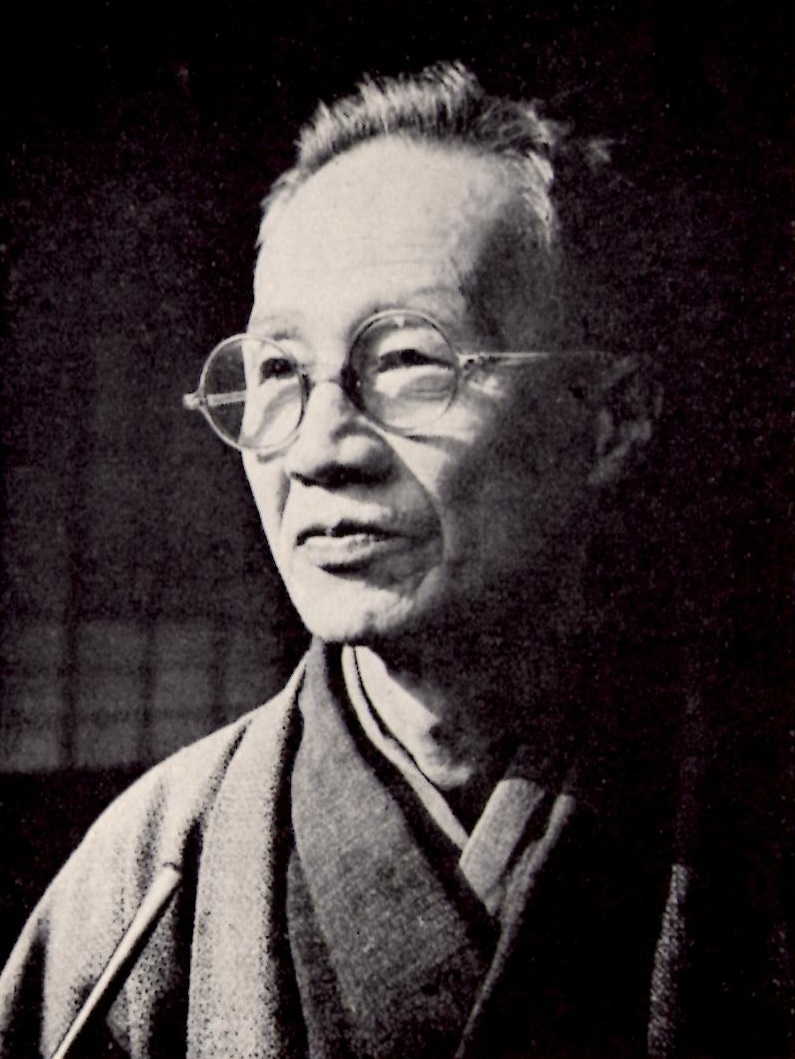
Hōei Nojiri.

Hōei Nojiri (野尻 抱影, Nojiri Hōei; November 15, 1885 – October 30, 1977) was a Japanese essayist and astronomer. He was a brother of the novelist Nojiri Haruhikoˀ, whose pen name was Osaragi Jirō.

In 1930 he coined the Japanese word Meiōsei (冥王星, "Star of the King (God) of the Underworld") for the then-newly-discovered dwarf planet Pluto. The name was then borrowed into Chinese and Korean.

== See also ==
- Osaragi Jirō [information on family]
- 3008 Nojiri (main-belt asteroid)
