= Iwahashi Zenbei =

Iwahashi Zenbei (岩橋 善兵衛; 1756–1811) was a Japanese scientist and optician.

== Biography ==
He was born in Kaizuka, Osaka, in a merchant family, became independent to be an optician, then was interested in natural science and learned scientific methodology and physics from Minagawa Kien, a scholar of I Ching, in Kyoto. He observed movements of the sun, the moon, stars, and developed an instrument to calculate the movements of celestial bodies and tides called Heitengi (平天儀) in 1801 and wrote the theoretical book of astronomy called Heitengi zukai (平天儀図解) in 1802.

Zenbei researched some imported optical instruments, then in 1793, made his first telescope. It had quite a good reputation then he made many telescopes of Galileo type and Kepler type, which widely used among astronomers and feudal rulers. His descendants became telescope makers for four generations.

Zenbei Land, an education center for astronomy and its history named in honor of Zenbei, equipped with a 600 mm diameter newtonian/cassegrain reflector, has been open to public since 1992 by Kaizuka municipal government.

An asteroid 7538 Zenbei was named after him.
