= Leopold Courvoisier =

Swiss astronomer

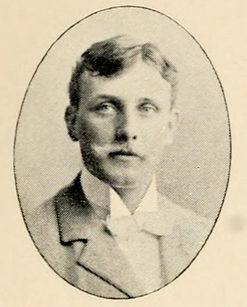

Leopold Courvoisier (1873–1955) was a Swiss astronomer. He was born in Riehen, Switzerland, near Basel. He was the chief observer at the observatory in Babelsberg (near Berlin) from 1905 to 1938.

Besides many contributions to observational astronomy, he attempted to detect the absolute motion of the Solar System through the ether, using a variety of methods, both astronomical and experimental. However, his work was largely ignored by the scientific community.
