= Vladimír Porubčan =

Slovak astronomer

Prof. RNDr. Vladimír Porubčan, DrSc., (born 1940) is a Slovak astronomer. He is a member of Astronomical Institute of Slovak Academy of Sciences, Department of Interplanetary Matter. His field of interest contains meteors, meteor streams, meteorites, asteroids, and comets. His significant works along with RNDr. Jáh Štohl, DrSc. considerably explained origin of Taurid meteor complex. He made multiple meteor observations and data analyses on forward scatter radar at Modra Observatory and backscatter radar at Ondřejov Observatory. He is also an acting professor at Faculty of Mathematics, Physics and Informatics, Comenius University, Bratislava. Asteroid 6311 Porubčan was named in honour of him.
