= Thebe Medupe =

South African astronomer

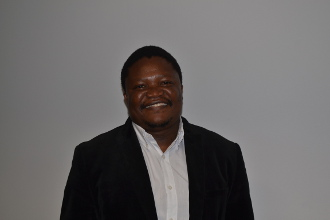
- Prof Thebe Medupe
- Born: Thebe Rodney Medupe; 1973
- Education: University of Cape Town
- Known for: Cosmic Africa
- Scientific career
- Fields: Astrophysicist
- Workplaces: North-West University
- Thesis: Studies of non-adiabatic pulsations in the atmospheres of the roAp stars (2002)

Thebe Rodney Medupe (born 1973) is a South African astrophysicist and founding director of Astronomy Africa. He is perhaps best known for his work on the Cosmic Africa project that attempts to reconcile science and myth.

== Biography ==
Thebe Medupe, born in 1972, grew up in a poor village outside Mmabatho, without electricity, lights or television, where he sat near the fire under the African sky, listening to the elders tell traditional Setswana stories. His family made sacrifices to send him to a fine, modern high school in Mmabatho, where science and mathematics captured his imagination. Halley's comet inspired Medupe to build a crude telescope with a cardboard tube and lenses donated by a school lab technician, at the age of 13. On an unforgettable chilly, windy night, he pointed his telescope at the Moon, and found himself looking at mountains, plains and craters on another world.

At the age of 17 in 1990, Medupe won a Science Olympiad and was awarded a trip to England to visit the science institutions, which was the first time he had been outside Africa.

He told Black Britain: "I made sure I went to the Greenwich observatory where I saw a working telescope for the very first time. It increased my motivation to become a scientist."

From that point Medupe became more interested in maths and science and read more widely. On completing school he won a scholarship to study at the University of Cape Town.

There he took a first degree in physics and a masters and doctorate in astrophysics. On leaving university, Medupe's first role was as a research fellow at the University of Cape Town. However, he asked the director of the observatory to allow him to return to his home town to try to get some of the young black South Africans into astronomy. He said:

Part of my reason for wanting to do that was my annoyance at people telling me that black South Africans were not interested in astronomy.

Medupe received his doctorate in astronomy from the University of Cape Town for a thesis that studied the oscillations in stellar atmospheres. In particular, he investigated the interaction of radiative transfer and pulsations in the atmospheres of stars by solving non-adiabatic pulsation equations. He works as a researcher at SAAO and as a lecturer at the University of Cape Town. His other interests involve a study of African ethno-astronomy with a view to use this to attract black students into astronomy and science in general.

Within the first year nine young hopefuls were involved in research projects that he was conducting. Medupe is also involved in the National Astrophysics and Space Science Programme which aims to get young people into master's science programmes in astrophysics.

Medupe said that the problem of how to get young black children interested in science and technology is one that affects black people on the continent or in the diaspora generally.

=== Cultural Astronomy Research ===
Medupe is a principal investigator on a South Africa led collaboration with Mali to digitize and analyze science documents found in the Timbuktu Libraries.

== Cosmic Africa ==
Medupe worked with filmmakers Craig and Damon Foster (known for their award winning The Great Dance), together with project originator Anne Rogers and her co-worker Carina Rubin of Aland Pictures, to produce a panorama of Africa's mythic and practical interaction with the cosmos.

To sample the richness of African traditions and achievements, Medupe and the filmmakers travelled around South Africa and to Mali, Egypt and Namibia, learning from the local people and sharing modern perspectives.
