= John Hartnup Jr. =

Director of the Liverpool Observatory from 1888 to 1892

John Hartnup Jr. (1841 – 21 April 1892) was the second director of the Liverpool Observatory (which has since moved to become the Bidston Observatory) located at the West Waterloo Dock on the River Mersey in Liverpool, England. He served as the director of the observatory from 1888 until his death in 1892.

Hartnup was born in Somerset House in 1841. His father, John Hartnup Sr., was then the Assistant Secretary of the Royal Astronomical Society, but was appointed to be the first director of the new Liverpool Observatory in 1843. At the age of 21, Hartnup was appointed as his father's assistant at the observatory. In 1888, the elder Hartnup retired and the younger succeeded him as director of the observatory, which had since been relocated to Bidston Hill.

Hartnup's work at the Liverpool Observatory consisted of astronomical observations, meteorological observations, and the development of more accurate clocks. He was an active member and one-time vice president of the Liverpool Astronomical Society, and in February 1886 he was elected a fellow of the Royal Astronomical Society. On 21 April 1892, Hartnup went to the rooftop of the observatory to inspect the anemometers. The perimeter of the rooftop was lined by a wall about 20 inches high. While standing next to the wall, Hartnup "was seized with a fit of giddiness" and fell to his death. Ironically, he had previously warned his sister-in-law, who was there to witness the tragedy, of the dangers of standing near the low wall.
