= Karlis Kaufmanis =

Latvian-American astronomer

Kārlis Kaufmanis
- Born: February 21, 1910; Rīga, Latvia
- Died: June 21, 2003 (aged 93); Clearwater, Florida
- Education: University of Latvia
- Known for: Conjunction theory
- Scientific career
- Fields: Astronomy
- Workplaces: University of Latvia, University of Minnesota

Kārlis Kaufmanis (February 21, 1910, Riga, Latvia – June 21, 2003, Clearwater, Florida) was a Latvian-American astronomer. He is noted for his theory, on which he delivered a public lecture more than a thousand times, that the Star of Bethlehem was a conjunction of the planets Jupiter and Saturn that took place in 7 BC. He was also the author of several textbooks on astronomy, mathematics, and cosmology.

He held positions at the University of Latvia (1936–40), the French Lyceum (1940–44), and the Esslingen Gymnasium in Germany (1945–48). He moved to Gustavus Adolphus College in St. Peter, Minnesota as an associate professor in 1949. He joined the University of Minnesota as a visiting lecturer in 1961 and became an associate professor in 1963. He held the rank of full professor from 1970 until his retirement in 1978.

From time to time the School of Physics and Astronomy at the University of Minnesota holds the Karlis Kaufmanis Public Lecture. Speakers have included Clyde Tombaugh, discoverer of the dwarf planet Pluto, Carolyn Porco, noted for imaging work on the Voyager missions, and Michael E. Brown, discoverer of several dwarf planets in the Kuiper belt.

== Patron of the University of Latvia ==
Kārlis Kaufmanis is a silver patron of the University of Latvia Foundation. In 2003, 100,000 US dollars were bequeathed to the University of Latvia to promote the development of astronomy in Latvia. The will was used as an inviolable capital from which scholarships are paid to talented astronomy students.
