= Easton (surname) =

Easton is a surname. Notable people with the surname include:

- Adam Easton, English cardinal in the 14th century
- Amos Easton (1905–1968), better known as Bumble Bee Slim, American blues musician
- Alex Easton (born 1969), Northern Irish politician
- Brian Easton (economist) (born 1943), New Zealand economist
- Brian Easton (footballer) (born 1988), Scottish footballer
- Carla Easton (born 1985), Scottish singer-songwriter
- Clint Easton (born 1977), English professional footballer
- Cornelis Easton (1864–1929), Dutch journalist and astronomer
- David Easton (1917–2014), Canadian-born American political scientist
- Douglas Easton (fl. 1990s–2020s), British epidemiologist
- Dossie Easton (born 1944), American family therapist
- Elliot Easton (born 1953), American guitarist for The Cars
- Eric Easton (1927–1995), musician and record producer
- Florence Easton (1882–1955), English dramatic soprano
- Florence Easton (1890s soprano), English soprano of the early 1890s
- George W. Easton (1883–1966), Scottish businessman, footballer and sportsperson
- Jack Easton (Royal Navy officer) (1906–1994), Royal Naval Volunteer Reserve, winner of the George Cross
- John Easton (disambiguation), several people
- Joseph Lees Easton (fl. 1940s–1950s), Canadian politician
- Ken Easton (1924–2001), English doctor
- Mark Easton (born 1959), BBC News Home Editor
- Matthew George Easton (1823–1894), Scottish Presbyterian preacher and writer
- Michael Easton (born 1967), American television actor
- Nicholas Easton (c. 1593–1675), colonial governor of Rhode Island
- Penelope Easton (1923–2020), American dietician, nutritionist, and educator
- Peter Easton (c. 1570–1620 or after), Canadian pirate
- Peter Easton (cricketer) (born 1936), Australian cricketer
- Richard Easton (1933–2019), Canadian actor
- Robert Easton (disambiguation), several people
- Roger L. Easton (1921–2014), inventor of GPS
- Sam Easton (born 1979), Canadian actor
- Sheena Easton (born 1959), Scottish pop singer and songwriter
- Sidney Easton (1885–1971), American actor, stage performer, playwright, composer, vocalist, and pianist
- Tim Easton (born 1966), American guitarist
- William Easton (disambiguation), several people
