= Anton Pannekoek =

Dutch astronomer and Marxist theorist (1873–1960)

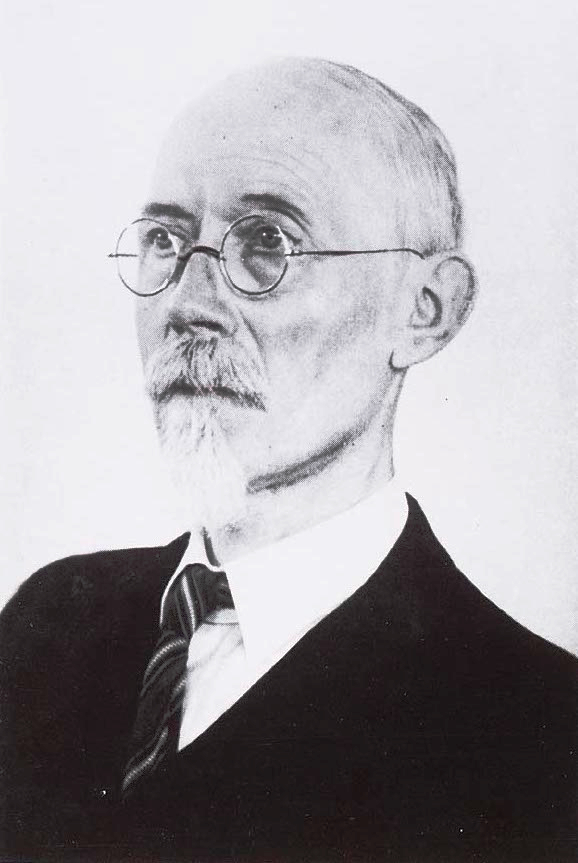
- Pannekoek in c. the late 1950s
- Born: Antonie Pannekoek; 2 January 1873; Vaassen, Netherlands
- Died: 28 April 1960 (aged 87); Wageningen, Netherlands
- Education: Leiden University
- Known for: Council communism; Astrophysics of stellar atmospheres; Milky Way drawings
- Awards: Honorary doctorate from Harvard University (1936); Gold Medal of the Royal Astronomical Society (1953)
- Scientific career
- Fields: Astronomy; politics
- Workplaces: Leiden University; University of Amsterdam
- Doctoral advisor: H. G. van de Sande Bakhuyzen
- Doctoral students: Gale Bruno van Albada
- Other notable students: Elsa van Dien

Antonie "Anton" Pannekoek (Dutch: [ˈɑntɔn ˈpɑnəkuk]; 2 January 1873 – 28 April 1960) was a Dutch astronomer, historian, philosopher, Marxist theorist, and socialist revolutionary. He was one of the main theorists of council communism (Dutch: radencommunisme).

== Early life ==
Antonie Pannekoek was born on 2 January 1873 in Vaassen, Gelderland. His father managed a small metal foundry and his mother was a midwife. He had two sisters and a brother. His elder brother, Adolf, attended the Hogere Burgerschool, Apeldoorn. At the age of 12 Anton borrowed a textbook from his brother and studied the constellation Gemini, where he noticed an extra point of light. Upon reflection he realised this was the planet Saturn. He soon followed his brother in attending the same school, where he showed a strong scientific aptitude, particularly in biology and astronomy.

== Early career ==
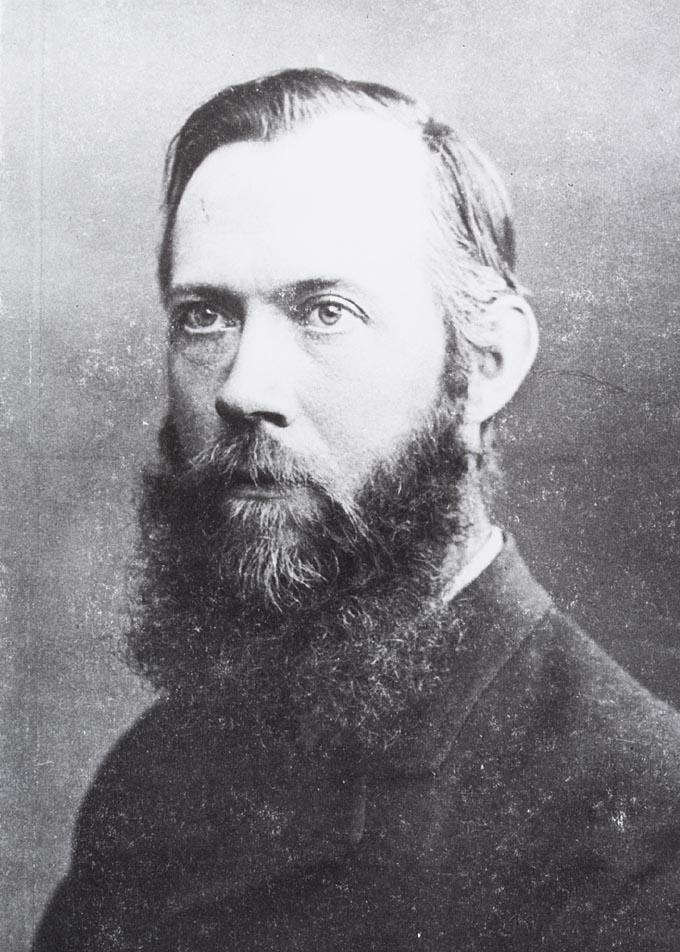
Pannekoek in 1908

Pannekoek studied mathematics and physics in Leiden from 1891. Even before he went to college he was interested in astronomy and studied the Milky Way and variability of Polaris. He published his first article, On the Necessity of Further Researches on the Milky Way, as a student. He briefly worked as a geodesist before he returned to the Leiden Observatory (Leidse Sterrewacht) to work as an observer and write his thesis on the variability of Algol.

After reading Edward Bellamy's Equality, Pannekoek became a convinced socialist and started studying the philosophies of Karl Marx and Joseph Dietzgen. Soon Pannekoek became a well-known Marxist writer, writing for both Dutch and German socialist magazines, like Die Neue Zeit. His astronomical and socialist careers first clashed when he was reprimanded for leading a strike support committee and was punished with dismissal from his job at the observatory by the Dutch government.

Around the same time, Pannekoek was growing dissatisfied with the stale atmosphere and outdated methodologies at the Leiden Observatory. Pannekoek was offered the option to become a lecturer in historical materialism at a school funded by the Social Democratic Party of Germany. He soon ran into trouble with the German authorities, who threatened him with expulsion if he continued teaching. He remained in Berlin, however, where he kept writing for journals and newspapers. In 1910, he moved to Bremen where he soon became one of the most prominent proponents of the radical Bremen Left.

Pannekoek was on holiday in the Netherlands when the First World War broke out. Prevented from returning to Germany, he started work as a cosmographer and science teacher for secondary schools and a privaatdocent in the history of astronomy at Leiden University. Though Willem de Sitter wanted to hire him as assistant director at the Leiden Observatory in 1918, the appointment was prevented by the Dutch government because of Pannekoek's outspoken Marxist sympathies. Instead, the Amsterdam city council appointed him as a lecturer at the University of Amsterdam in 1918. In 1921, he founded the astronomical institute there; in 1925, he was appointed as an extraordinary professor; and in 1932 as a full professor.

== Astronomy ==
Pannekoek began systematically observing the night sky and recording these observations while he was still in secondary school. Some of his observations of variable stars later found their way into his scientific publications. In the winter of 1889–1890, he recorded the variability of Polaris, which had been suspected before but would not be confirmed until 1908 by Ejnar Hertzsprung. He also tracked the variability of Algol, which formed the foundation for his PhD thesis.

Another early interest of Pannekoek was the appearance of the Milky Way. In 1898, Pannekoek published a series of articles in which he articulated how he thought the Milky Way should be observed. Here, he explained that minor details should be tracked through verbal descriptions, while the general distribution of light should be tracked to isophotic lines. Pannekoek published his own observations of the northern Milky Way in 1920 in the form of drawings, isophotic diagrams, and verbal descriptions. He also combined his observations with the independent observations of Cornelis Easton, Otto Boeddicker, and Julius Schmidt to create a composite image of the Milky Way, which he called the "mean subjective image". A few years later, he also published his observations of the southern Milky Way, which he made during an eclipse expedition to the Dutch East Indies in 1926. He also developed a photographic method to represent the light distribution of the Milky Way. To capture the clouds that formed the Milky Way, Pannekoek deliberately recorded photographic plates out of focus, which caused the light of stars to spread into disks, allowing their light to overlap. These plates were then measured and combined into tables showing the surface brightness of the Milky Way.

Pannekoek's research on the appearance of the Milky Way was closely connected to his research on the structure of the galaxy. In this research, he adapted the statistical methods of Jacobus Kapteyn to investigate individual clusters in the galaxy. His most important results were the measurement of the distance to the star clusters responsible for the Milky Way clouds in Cygnus and Aquila. He determined that these were located at a distance of 40,000–60,000 parsec from the sun. This was much more distant than was commonly assumed to be the diameter of the entire galactic system. This result provided early evidence for Harlow Shapley's expanded galaxy.

The final decades of his professional career Pannekoek mostly spent on researching the astrophysics of stellar atmospheres. In his theoretical research, Pannekoek explored ways to expand upon Meghnad Saha's ionization formula to better understand the physical conditions in the outer layer of stars. One of his main conclusions was that the narrow spectral lines in c-type stars, as found by Antonia Maury, were most likely caused by lower pressure in the stellar atmospheres. In the 1930s, he developed theoretical models for the atmospheres in order to reproduce the entire spectrum of a star, but failed to produce a model that was entirely satisfactory. In 1935, Rupert Wildt showed that this was because Pannekoek had underestimated the impact of the H^{−} ion as a source of optical opacity.

In observational astrophysics, Pannekoek produced the curve of growth for Deneb in 1931, the first for a star other than the sun. He and his students also published comprehensive catalogues of the spectral lines in late type stars based on photographic plates taken by Pannekoek at the Dominion Astrophysical Observatory in 1929. Because of these studies, he is considered to be the founder of astrophysics as a separate discipline in the Netherlands. Pannekoek was also part of scientific expeditions to observe solar eclipses in Sumatra and Lapland. He was also interested in the history of astronomy and his book, A History of Astronomy, is considered a standard reference on the subject.

Pannekoek became member of the Royal Netherlands Academy of Arts and Sciences in 1925. His work in galactic structure, astrophysics and the history of astronomy was of international renown and won him an honorary degree from Harvard University in 1936, as well as the Gold Medal of the Royal Astronomical Society in 1951. The crater Pannekoek on the Moon and the asteroid 2378 Pannekoek are named after him. The Anton Pannekoek Institute for Astronomy at the University of Amsterdam, which he founded, was named after him in 1982.

== Thought ==
=== Council communism ===
A recognized Marxist theorist, Pannekoek was one of the founders of council communism and a main figure in the radical left in the Netherlands and Germany. He was active in the Social Democratic Workers' Party (Netherlands), Social Democratic Party of Germany, Communist Party of the Netherlands, the Communist Workers' Party of the Netherlands and the Communist Workers' Party of Germany.

Pannekoek was best known for his writing on workers' councils. He regarded these as a new form of organisation capable of overcoming the limitations of the old institutions of the labour movement, the trade unions and social democratic parties. Basing his theory on what he regarded as the practical lessons of the 1917 Russian Revolution, Pannekoek argued that the workers' revolution and the transition from capitalism to communism had to be achieved by the workers themselves, democratically organised in workers' councils.

Pannekoek was a sharp critic of anarchism, social democracy, and Vladimir Lenin and Leninism. During the early years of the Russian revolution, Pannekoek gave critical support to the Bolsheviks, a position shared by fellow council communist Herman Gorter. He expressed misgivings about the authoritarian tendencies of Leninism, fearing for the socialist character of the Russian Revolution unless it should find a rectifying support in a proletarian revolution in the West. His later analysis of the failure of the Russian revolution was that after Lenin and the Bolsheviks came to power, they crippled the soviets. Instead of workers' councils, the Bolsheviks had instituted the rule of their party, which in Pannekoek's view is what led to the institution of the Bolsheviks as a new ruling class. He put his views forward in his 1938 book Lenin als Philosoph, originally published in German under the pseudonym J. Harper. It was translated into English in 1948 as Lenin as philosopher - a critical examination of the philosophical basis of Leninism.

=== Marxism and Darwinism ===
In a pamphlet, Pannekoek strongly attacked and rebutted the arguments of Social Darwinists such as Herbert Spencer, whom Pannekoek dubbed "Bourgeois Darwinists". On the basis of Charles Darwin's own writings—in particular on The Descent of Man, and Selection in Relation to Sex (1871)—Pannekoek stated:

Their claim [of the Bourgeois Darwinists] is that the extermination of the weak is natural and that it is necessary in order to prevent the corruption of the race, and that the protection given to the weak serves to deteriorate the race. But what do we see? In nature itself, in the animal world, we find that the weak are protected; that it is not by their own personal strength that they maintain themselves, and that they are not brushed aside on account of their personal weakness. This arrangement does not weaken the group, but gives to it new strength. The animal group in which mutual aid is best developed is best fit to maintain itself in the strife.

— Anton Pannekoek, Darwinism and Marxism, p. 39

== Works ==
=== Scientific writings ===
- Untersuchungen über den Lichtwechsel Algols (1902)
- De wonderbouw der wereld - de grondslagen van ons sterrekundig wereldbeeld populair uiteengezet (1916, 1920, 1924)
- De astrologie en hare beteekenis voor de ontwikkeling der sterrekunde (1916)
- The distance of the Milky Way (1919)
- Die nördliche Milchstrasse (1920)
- Ionization in stellar atmospheres (1922)
- De astrophysica en hare moderne ontwikkeling (1925)
- Results of observations of the total solar eclipse of June 29, 1927 - 1: Photometry of the flash spectrum (1928) with Marcel Minnaert
- Results of observations of the total solar eclipse of June 29, 1927 - 2: Photometry of the chromosphere and the corona (1930) with N.W. Doorn
- The influence of collisions on the formation of the Fraunhofer lines (1931)
- The theoretical intensities of absorption lines in stellar spectra (1935)
- Antropogenese. Een studie over het ontstaan van de mens (1944)
- Photographic photometry of the southern Milky Way (1949); with David Koelbloed
- Line intensities in spectra of advanced type (1950)
  - English: Anthropogenesis: A study of the origin of man (1953)
- De groei van ons wereldbeeld - een geschiedenis van de sterrekunde (1951)
  - English: A History of Astronomy (1961)

=== Political and philosophical writings ===
- Ethik und Sozialismus - Umwälzungen im Zukunftsstaat (1906)
- Religion und Sozialismus - ein Vortrag (1906)
- Godsdienst en socialisme - voordracht, op 14 September 1905 te Bremen gehouden (1907)
- Ethiek en socialisme (1907)
- Marxisme en revisionisme (1907); with Herman Gorter
- Omwentelingen in den toekomststaat (1907)
- Der Kampf der Arbeiter : sieben Aufsaetze aus der Leipziger Volkszeitung (1907)
- Het marxisme / pro: A. Pannekoek, contra: M.W.F. Treub (1908); with Marie Willem Frederik Treub
- Darwinisme en marxisme (1909)
- Die taktischen Differenzen in der Arbeiterbewegung (1909)
- Uit de voorgeschiedenis van den wereldoorlog (1915)
- De oorlog : zijn oorsprong en zijn bestrijding (ca. 1915)
- "The Third International," International Socialist Review, vol. 17, no. 7 (January 1917), pp. 460–462.
- Lenin als Philosoph(1938) pseud.: J. Harper
  - English: Lenin as Philosopher: A Critical Examination of the Philosophical Basis of Leninism. (1948)
  - Dutch: Lenin als filosoof. Een kritische beschouwing over de filosofische grondslagen van het Leninisme (1973)
- De arbeidersraden (1946) pseud.: P. Aartsz
  - English: Workers' Councils (1947)
- The Workers' Way to Freedom and Other Council Communist Writings (1935–1954). Robyn K. Winters, ed. (2024)
