= Firmicus =

Firmicus may refer to:

- The lunar crater Firmicus.
- The Christian astrologer Julius Firmicus Maternus (fourth century), after whom the crater is named.
- Firmicus (spider), a spider genus
