= Van Albada =

van Albada may refer to:

- Gale Bruno van Albada (1912-1972), Dutch astronomer
  - Van Albada (crater), a crater on the Moon named after him
  - 2019 van Albada, an asteroid named after him
