= Marxism and Darwinism =

Marxism and Darwinism (Dutch: Marxisme en darwinisme) is a 1909 pamphlet by Dutch Marxist Anton Pannekoek. Originally, the pamphlet was prepared as a lecture delivered by Pannekoek within the circles of the social-democratic parties of the Netherlands and Germany. Its publication was timed to coincide with the centenary of Charles Darwin's birth and reflected the intellectual climate of the early 20th century, when Marxists took a keen interest in the natural sciences. In 1909, the text was first printed in Leipzig, and in 1914 it was reissued in an expanded second edition. The work was quickly translated into several languages: German (1909), Estonian, English (1912), Ukrainian (1920), and Chinese (1922). In particular, the first Ukrainian translation appeared in Winnipeg, published by the Ukrayinski Robitnychi Visti (1920). Pannekoek, who was also a prominent astronomer, sought to apply the Marxist approach to the analysis of the natural sciences.

At the time of writing Marxism and Darwinism, Pannekoek belonged to the left wing of social democracy. He criticized orthodox party theorists while remaining within the framework of Marxism. At that time, a spirit of positivism and faith in science prevailed in Marxist circles, and Darwin's theory of evolution was regarded as a progressive doctrine that undermined old religious dogmas. Pannekoek's pamphlet emerged amid discussions about the interrelation between the laws of natural selection and the laws of social development, as well as debates with the then-popular ideas of social Darwinism. Marxism and Darwinism became a Marxist response to attempts to use Darwinism against socialism.
