= Ius promovendi =

The ius promovendi, in Dutch higher education, is the right to supervise doctoral students. Its name is Latin, literally meaning "the right to promote". Accordingly, a doctoral student is called promovendus (literally, one who is to be promoted).

Traditionally, the right to promote has been given only to full professors (hoogleraren). Lower-ranked Dutch academics can act as the day-to-day supervisor of a doctoral student, but only professors with the ius promovendi may be listed as the official advisor ("promotor") at the doctoral defense of a student. In 2017, the Dutch parliament passed a law extending the ius promovendi to some associate professors.

In higher education in Germany, the same phrase has been used to describe the right of universities to offer doctoral programs and grant doctoral degrees. Originally, this was given only to traditional universities, but in the late 19th and early 20th centuries under the direction of Prussian education minister Friedrich Althoff, the ius promovendi was also extended to technical universities.
