= Lacus Perseverantiae =

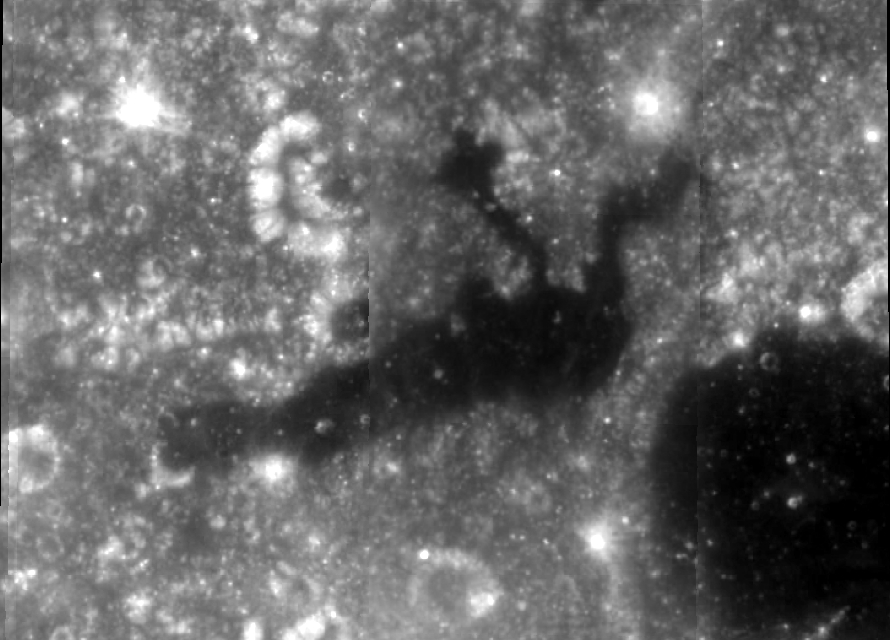
- Coordinates: 8.0°N 62.0°E
- Diameter: 70 km
- Eponym: Lake of Perseverance

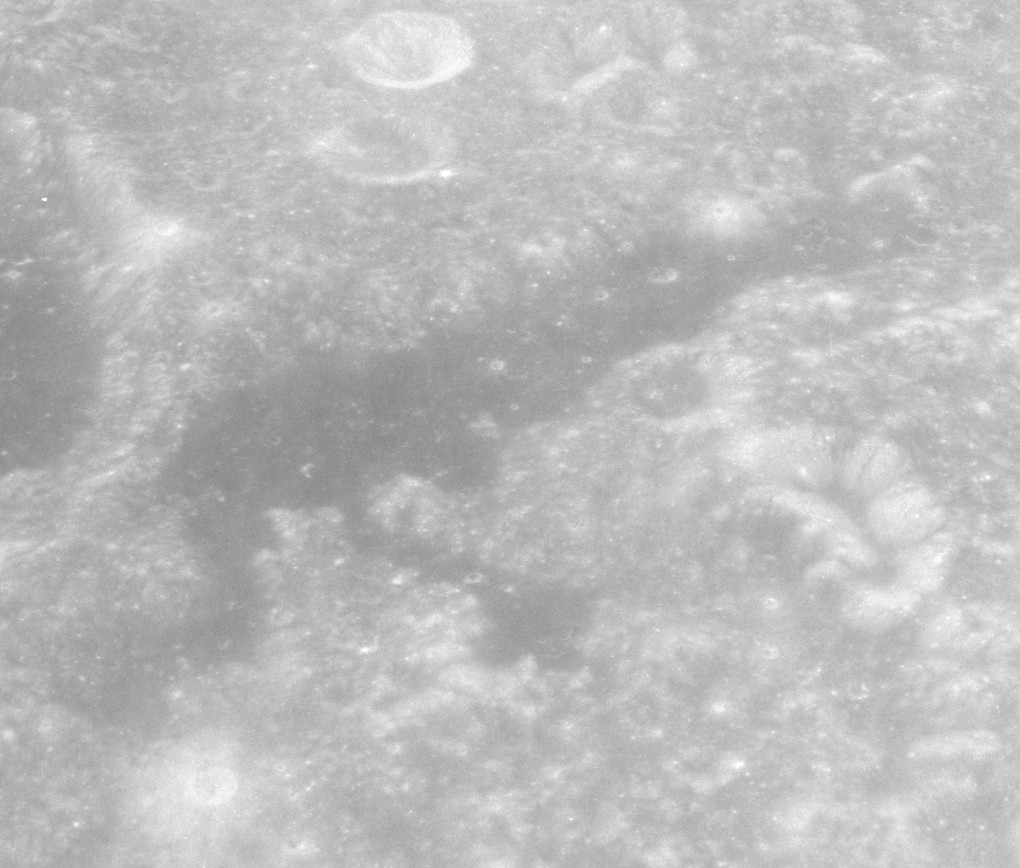
Oblique view of Lacus Perseverantiae, facing south, from Apollo 17

Lacus Perseverantiae (Latin persevērantiae, "Perseverance") is a small lunar mare extending westward from the northwestern exterior of the crater Firmicus, with smaller extensions to the northeast and northwest at the eastern terminus. Its name is Latin for Lake of Perseverance. The selenographic coordinates are 8.0° N, 62.0° E, and it has a length of 70 km, but a maximum width of less than 15 km.

The name of the lacus was adopted by the IAU in 1979.
