= Adrien Auzout =

French astronomer (1622–1691)

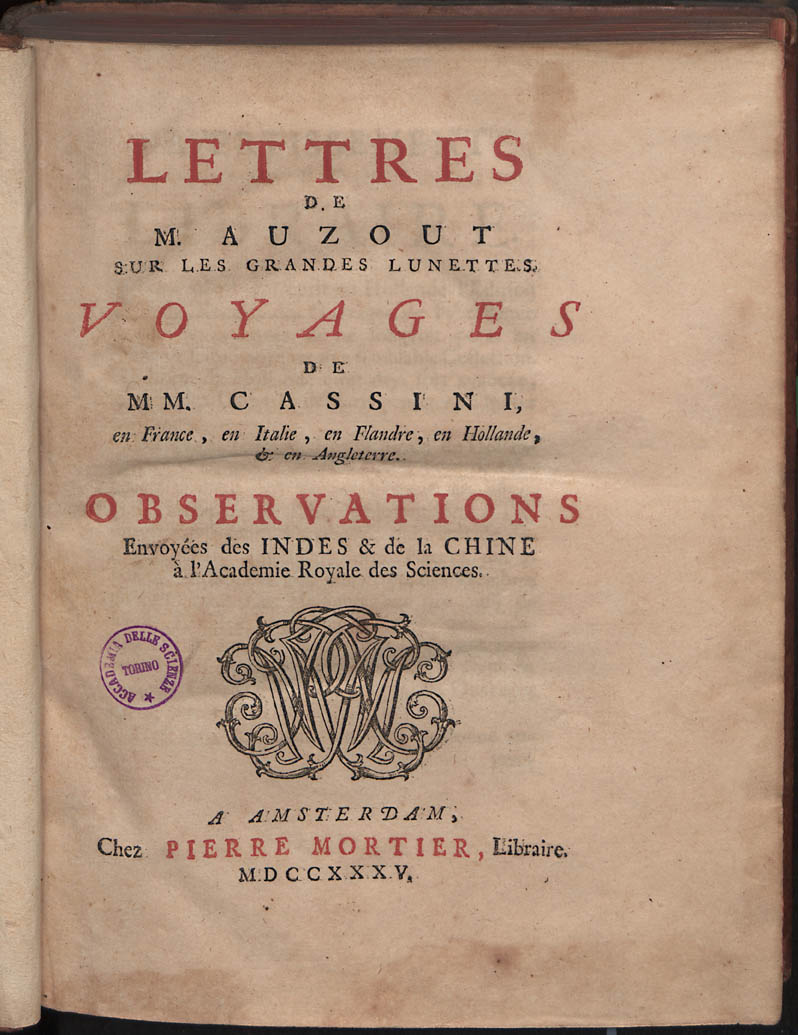
Lettres sur les grandes lunettes, 1735

Adrien Auzout French pronunciation: [ozu.(t‿)] (28 January 1622 – 23 May 1691) was a French astronomer.

He was born in Rouen, France, the eldest child of a clerk in the court of Rouen. His educational background is unknown, although he may have attended the Jesuit college in Rouen. Adrien left for Paris during the 1640s, where he developed an interest in astronomy and became well known in academic circles. In 1664–1665 he made observations of comets, and argued in favor of their following elliptical or parabolic orbits (in this he was opposed by his rival Johannes Hevelius). Adrien was briefly a member of the Académie Royale des Sciences from 1666 to 1668 (he may have left due to a dispute) and a founding member of the Paris Observatory. He was elected a Fellow of the Royal Society of London in 1666. He then left for Italy and spent the next 20 years in that country, finally dying in Rome in 1691. Little is known about his activities during this last period.

He was described as a good optician and maker of telescopes. He is also said to have had poor health through much of his life.

Auzout made contributions in telescope observations, including perfecting the use of the micrometer. He made many observations with large aerial telescopes and he is noted for briefly considering the construction of a huge aerial telescope 1,000 feet in length that he would use to observe animals on the Moon. In 1647 he performed an experiment that demonstrated the role of air pressure in function of the mercury barometer. In 1667–68, Auzout and Jean Picard attached a telescopic sight to a 38-inch quadrant, and used it to accurately determine positions on the Earth.

Auzout, the Moon crater, is named after him.

== Works ==
- Auzout, Adrien (1665). Lettre à monsieur l'Abbé Charles, sur le Ragguaglio di due nuove osservationi, etc. da Giuseppe Campani (in French). Jean Cusson.
- Auzout, Adrien (1735). Lettres sur les grandes lunettes (in French). Pieter Mortier.
