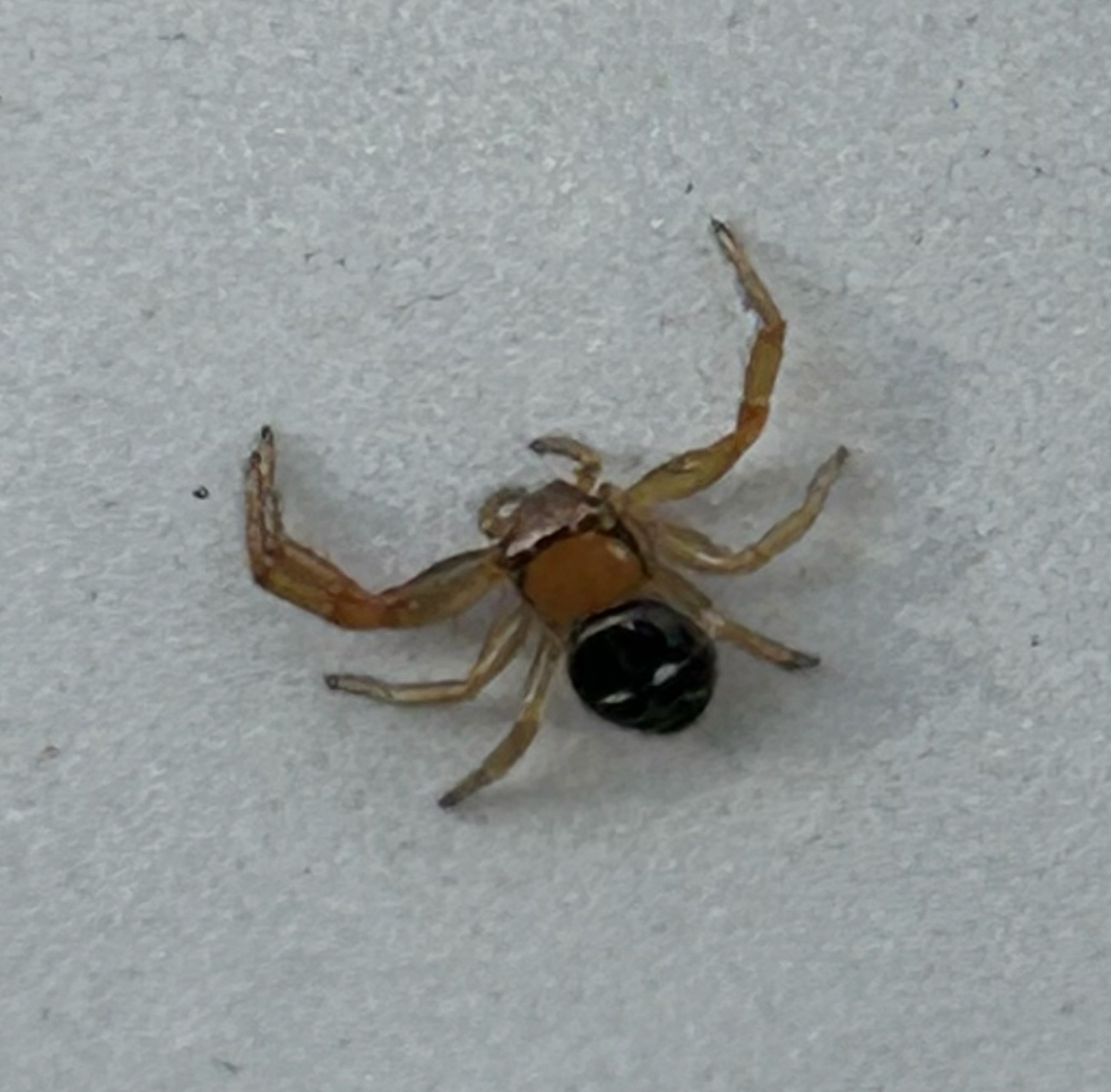

Scientific classification
- Kingdom: Animalia
- Phylum: Arthropoda
- Subphylum: Chelicerata
- Class: Arachnida
- Order: Araneae
- Infraorder: Araneomorphae
- Family: Thomisidae
- Genus: Firmicus
- Species: F. abnormis

Binomial name
- Firmicus abnormis (Lessert, 1923)

Synonyms
- Synaema (Firmicus) abnorme Lessert, 1923

= Firmicus abnormis =

Species of spider

Firmicus abnormis is a species of spider in the family Thomisidae. It is endemic to South Africa.

== Distribution ==
Firmicus abnormis is found only in South Africa, where it is known from the provinces Eastern Cape, Northern Cape, and Western Cape. It is protected in the protected areas De Hoop Nature Reserve, Table Mountain National Park, and Kirstenbosch National Botanical Garden.

== Habitat and ecology ==
Firmicus abnormis inhabits the Fynbos and Thicket biomes at altitudes ranging from 61 to 358 m above sea level.

It is a free-living plant dweller sampled from vegetation.

== Conservation ==
Firmicus abnormis is listed as Least Concern by the South African National Biodiversity Institute. Although the species is presently known only from one sex, it has a wide geographical range. It is protected in three protected areas.

== Taxonomy ==
Firmicus abnormis was originally described by Lessert in 1923 as Synaema (Firmicus) abnorme from Alicedale in the Eastern Cape. It was transferred to Firmicus by Roewer in 1955. The species is known only from the male. This species possibly belongs in Synema.
