= Van Albada (crater) =

Crater on the Moon

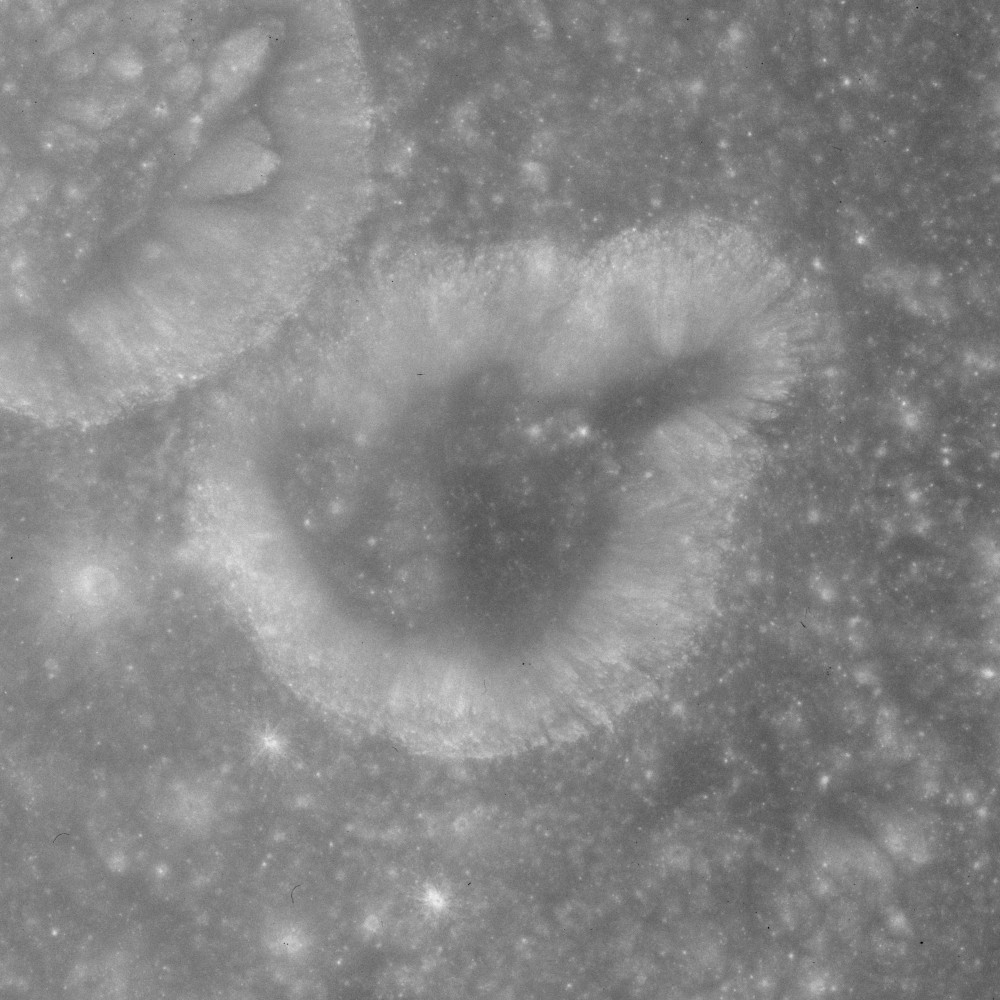
- Apollo 15 image
- Coordinates: 9.4°N 64.3°E
- Diameter: 21 km
- Colongitude: 294° at sunrise
- Eponym: G. B. van Albada

van Albada is a lunar impact crater that is attached to the south-southeastern rim of Auzout. It lies southeast of Mare Crisium, and north-northeast of the larger crater Firmicus. Directly to the east is Krogh.

While the perimeter of van Albada is generally circular, there is a slight outward bulge in the rim to the northwest, and a smaller crater lies across the eastern rim. The inner wall is slightly larger to the north than elsewhere, most likely because it abuts the outer rampart of Auzout. The interior floor is darker in hue than the surrounding terrain, with an albedo that matches the lunar mare to the northwest.

The crater is named after the Dutch astronomer Gale Bruno van Albada (1911–1972). This crater was previously designated Auzout A before being given a name by the IAU.

== Gallery ==
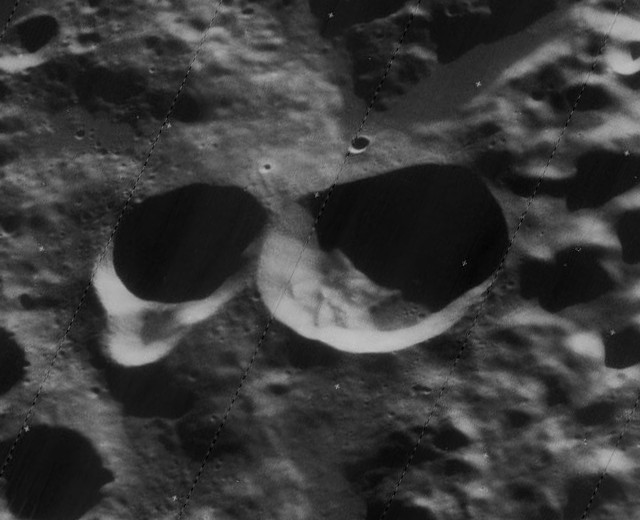
Oblique view of Van Albada (left) and Auzout (right), from Lunar Orbiter 4

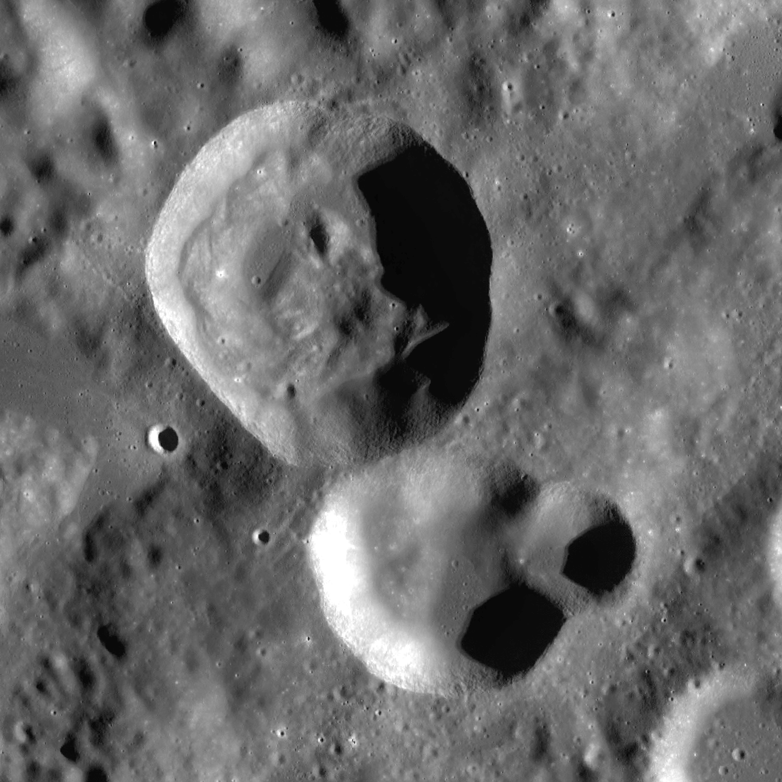
LRO image, Van Albada is on the bottom of the image

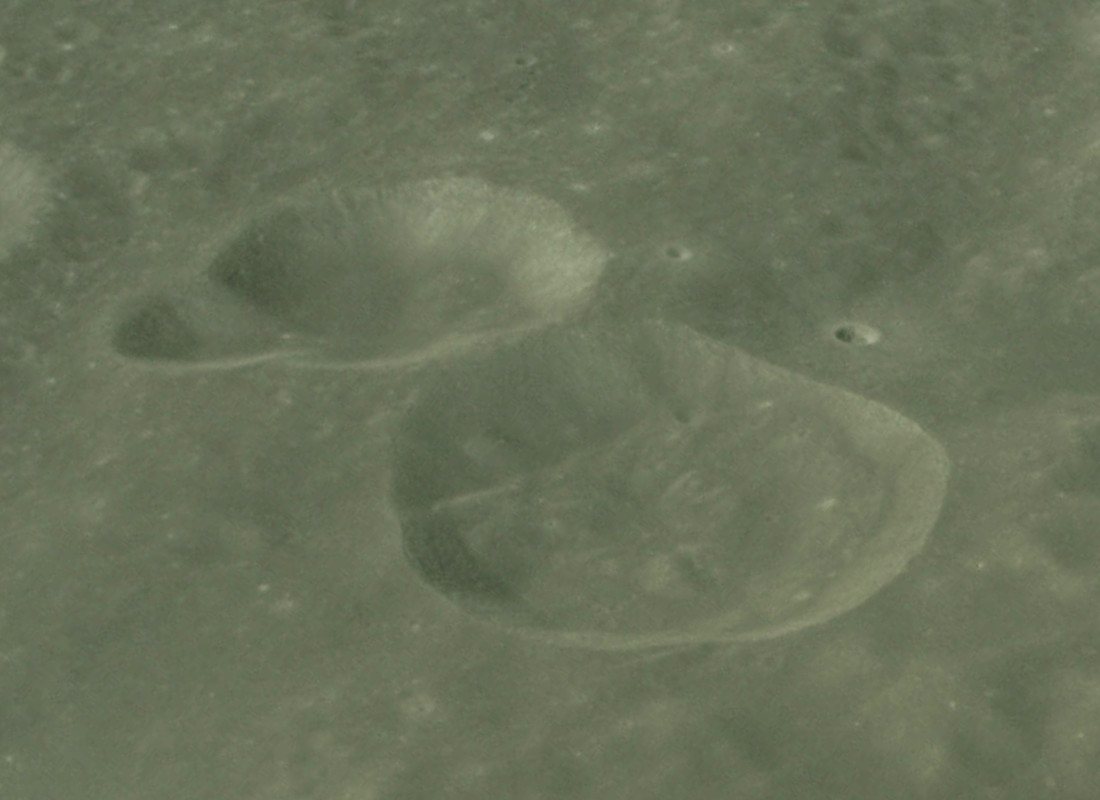
Apollo 17 image

== See also ==
- 2019 van Albada, minor planet
