= Firmicus (crater) =

Crater on the Moon

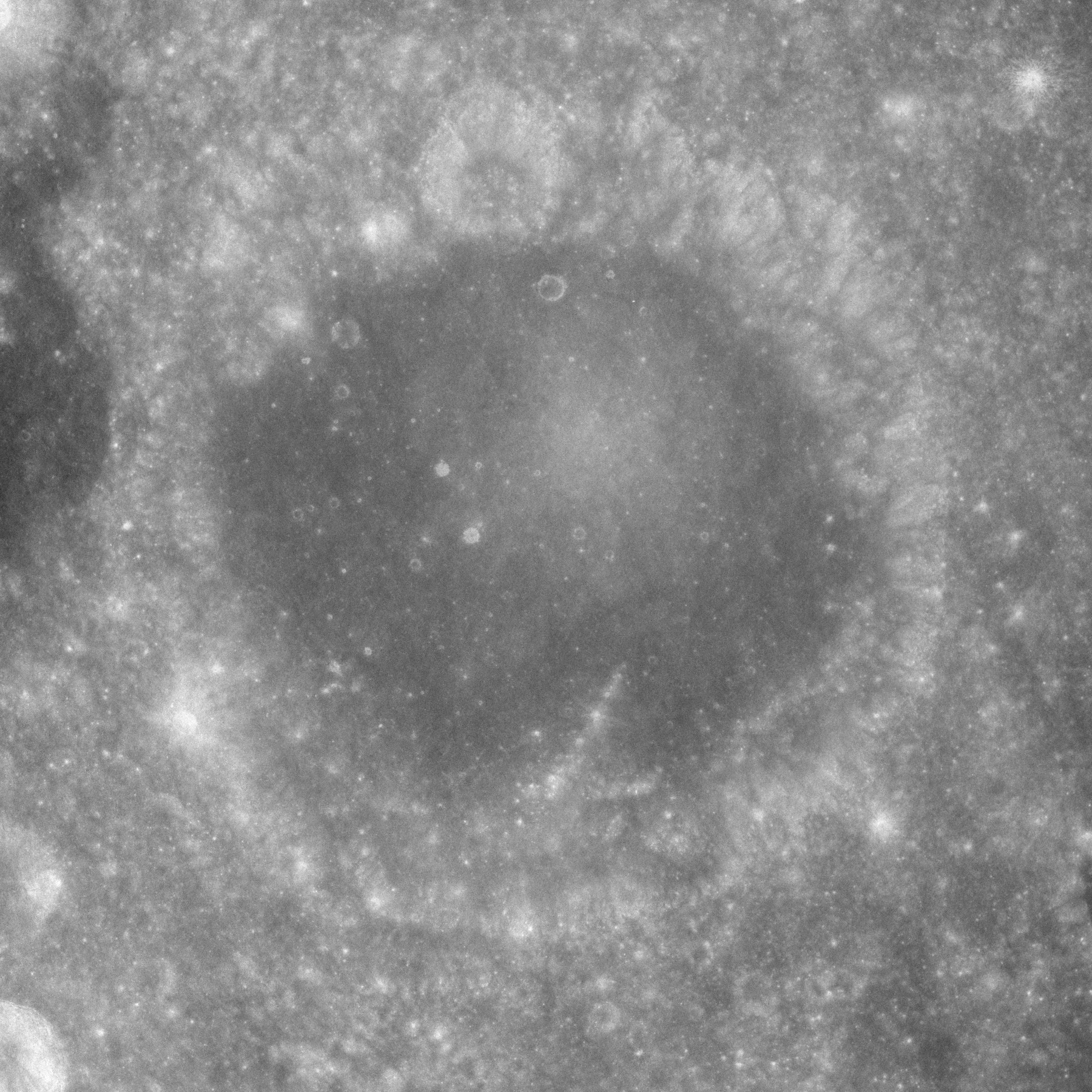
- Firmicus crater from the Apollo 17 CSM
- Coordinates: 7.3°N 63.4°E
- Diameter: 56.81 km (35.30 mi) km
- Depth: 2.14 km (1.33 mi)
- Colongitude: 297° at sunrise
- Formation: Nectarian
- Eponym: Julius Firmicus Maternus

Firmicus is a lunar impact crater that lies in the eastern part of the Moon's near side, so that from Earth it appears oval in shape due to foreshortening. It is, however, very nearly circular. The crater is located to the west of the Mare Undarum, and northeast of the similar-sized crater Apollonius. To the north of Firmicus are the craters van Albada and Auzout. Attached to its northwest rim is the Lacus Perseverantiae, a miniature lunar mare.

This crater dates to around the time the Crisium basin formed, during the Nectarian period on the lunar geologic timescale. The most notable aspect of Firmicus is the dark, flat floor. It has a similar albedo to the surface of Mare Crisium to the north, making it stand out somewhat from its surroundings. The floor has suffered no significant impacts since it was created, although there are undoubtedly many minor impacts across its surface. The outer rim of Firmicus has undergone some erosion, particularly along the northern rim where it is overlain by a pair of small craterlets.

This formation is named after 4th century Roman astrologer Julius Firmicus Maternus (flourished A.D. 330–354). His name was included with the lunar nomenclature of Itanian astronomer Giovanni Riccioli in 1651. Its designation was formally adopted by the International Astronomical Union in 1935.

== Gallery ==
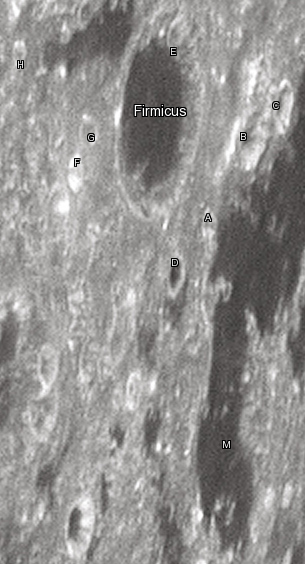
Firmicus crater and its satellite craters as seen from Earth

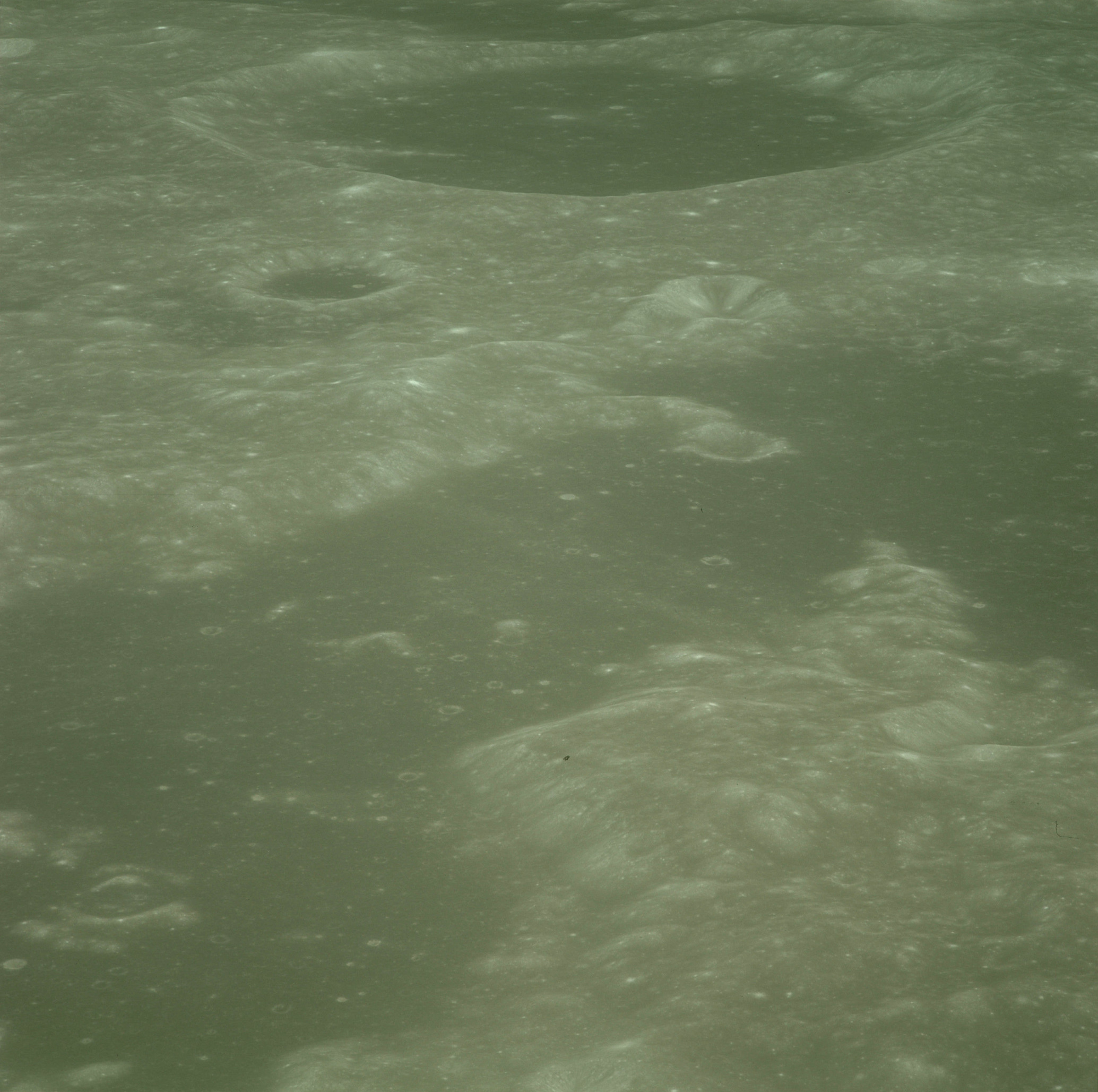
Oblique view with Firmicus behind Mare Undarum

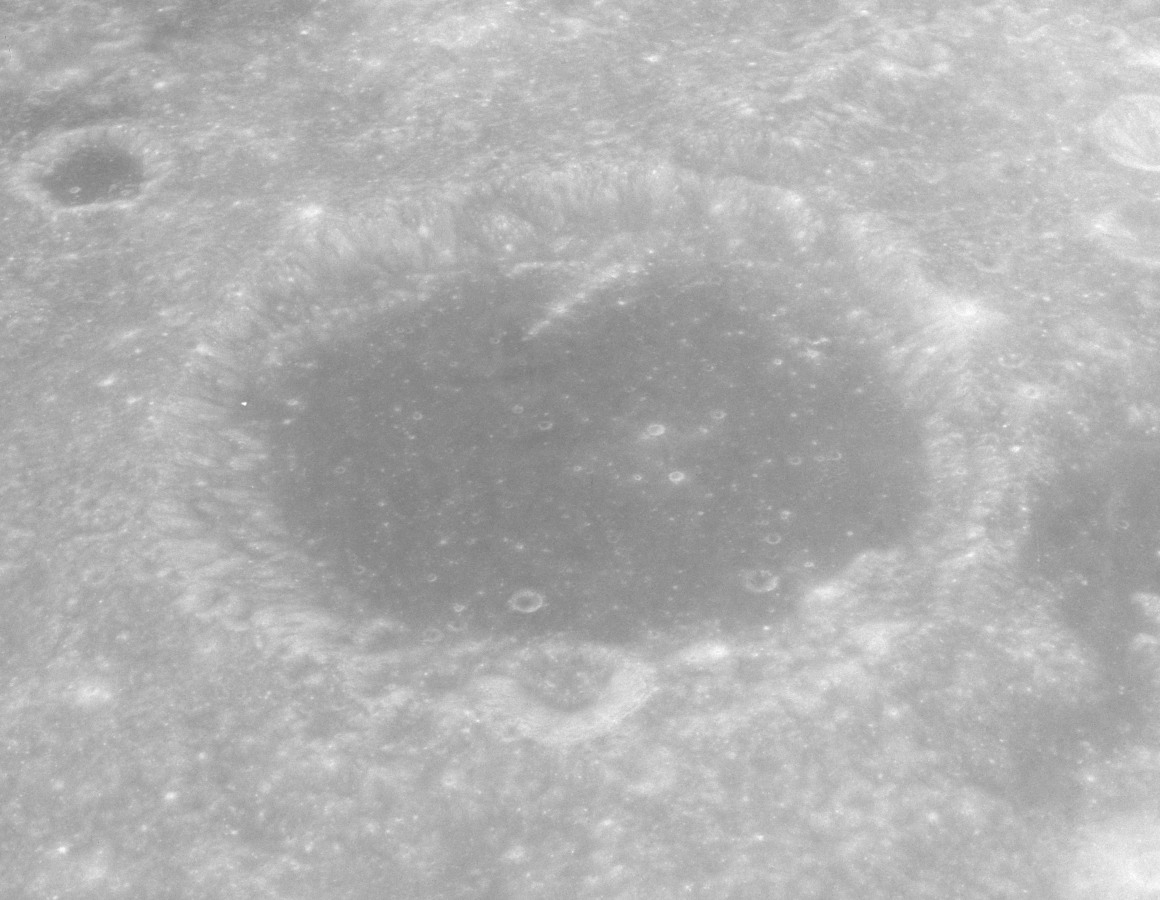
Oblique view of Firmicus facing south from Apollo 17

== Satellite craters ==
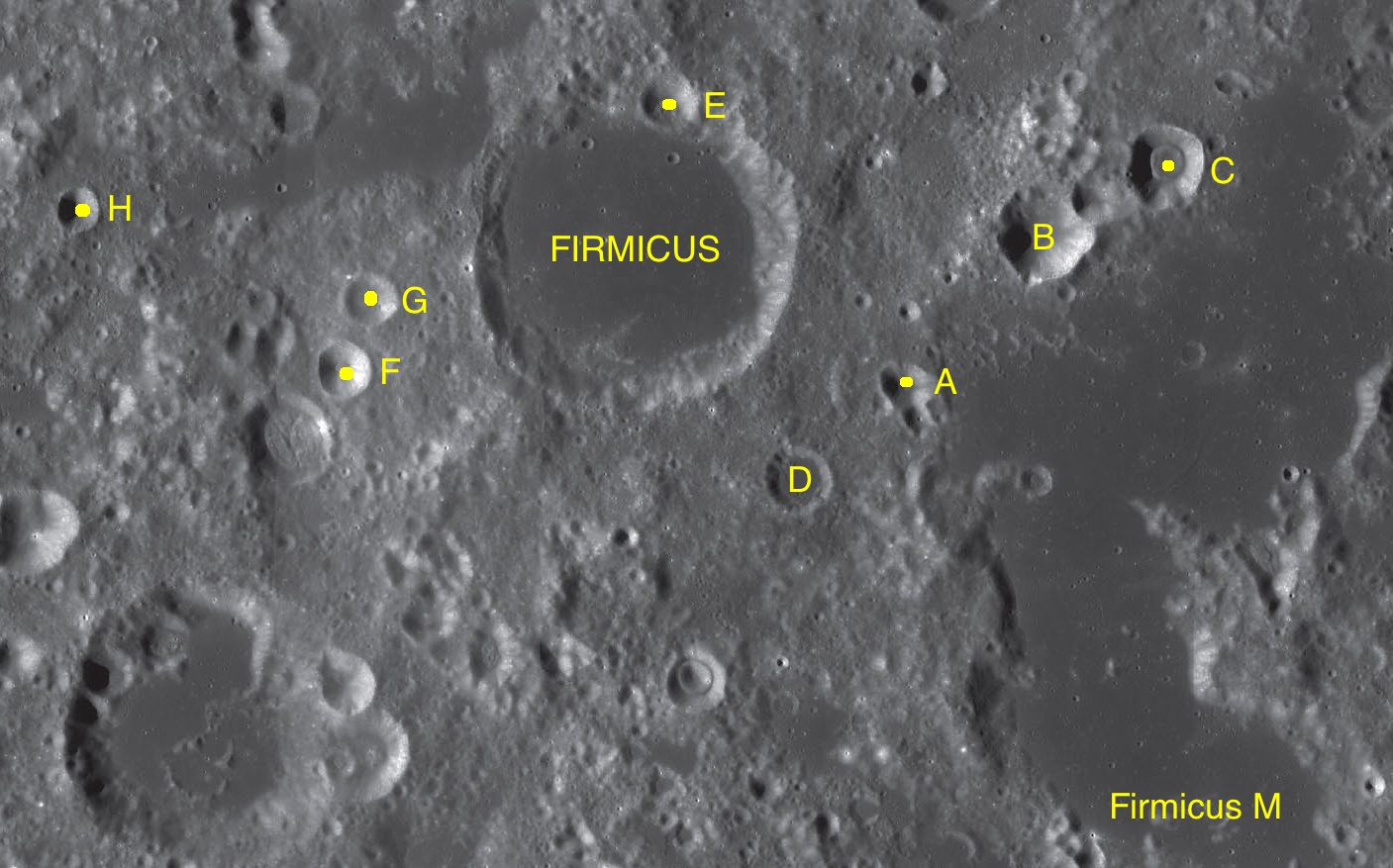
Firmicus satellite features and surroundings

By convention these features are identified on lunar maps by placing the letter on the side of the crater midpoint that is closest to Firmicus.

Firmicus	Latitude	Longitude	Diameter
A	6.4° N	65.1° E	8 km
B	7.3° N	65.8° E	14 km
C	7.7° N	66.5° E	13 km
D	5.9° N	64.4° E	11 km
E	8.0° N	63.6° E	9 km
F	6.5° N	61.8° E	9 km
G	6.9° N	61.9° E	9 km
H	7.5° N	60.3° E	7 km
M	4.1° N	67.2° E	42 km

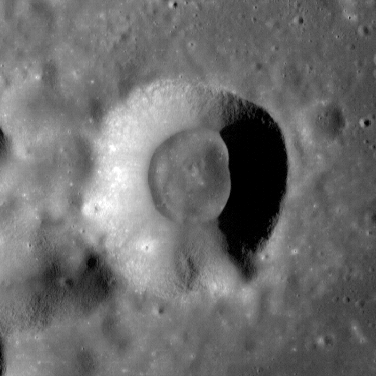
Firmicus C is a concentric crater

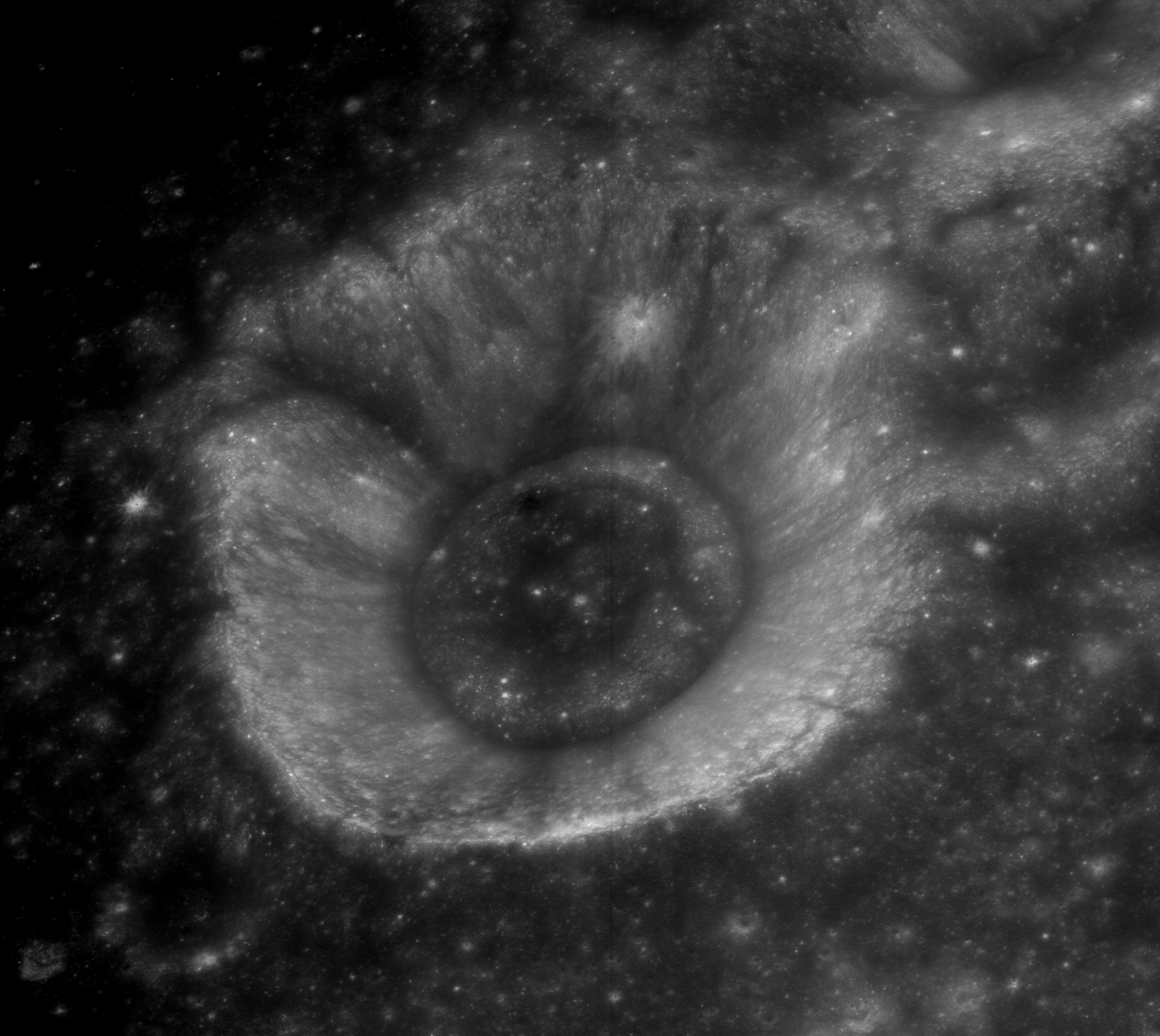
Oblique view of Firmicus C from Apollo 17
