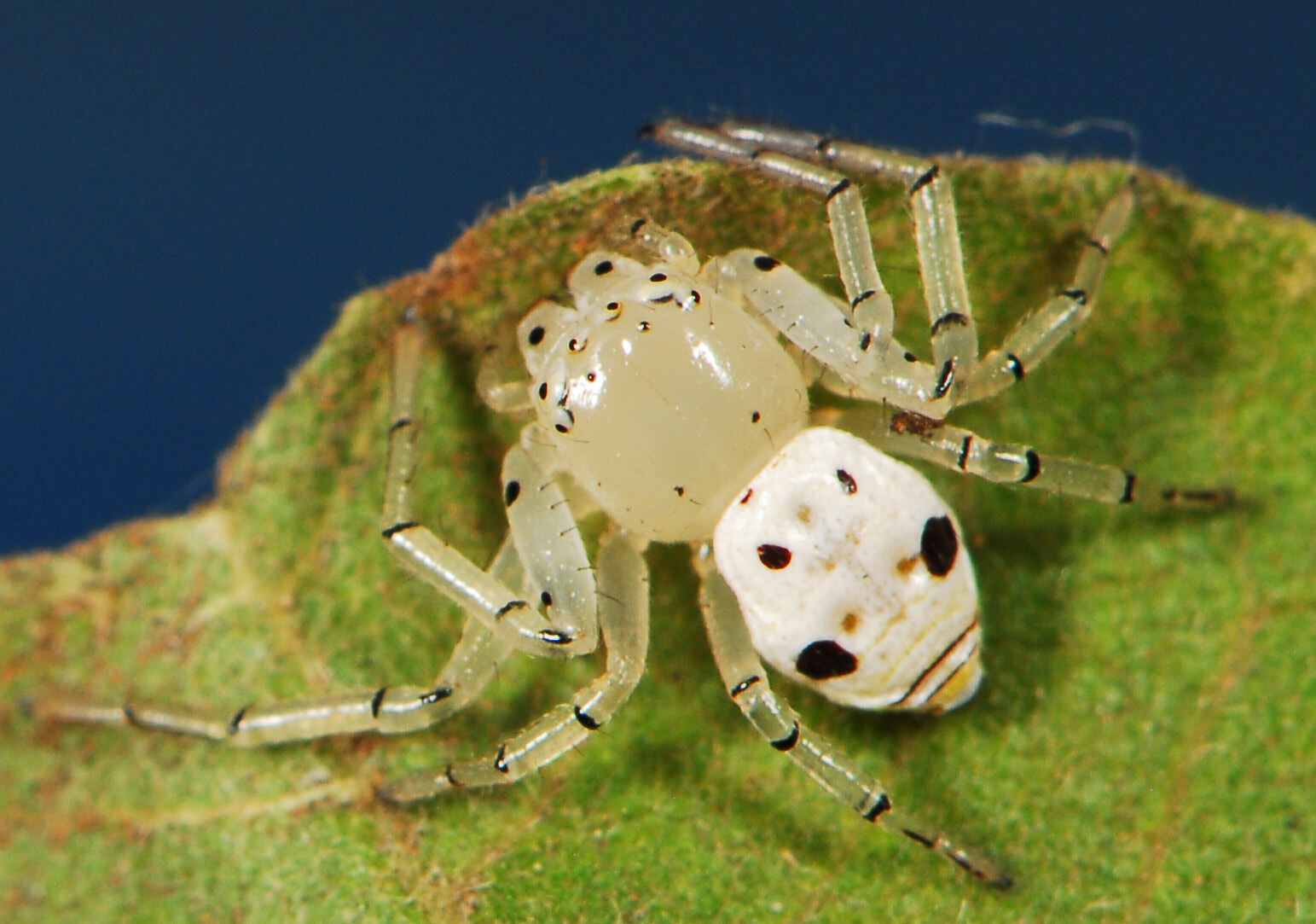

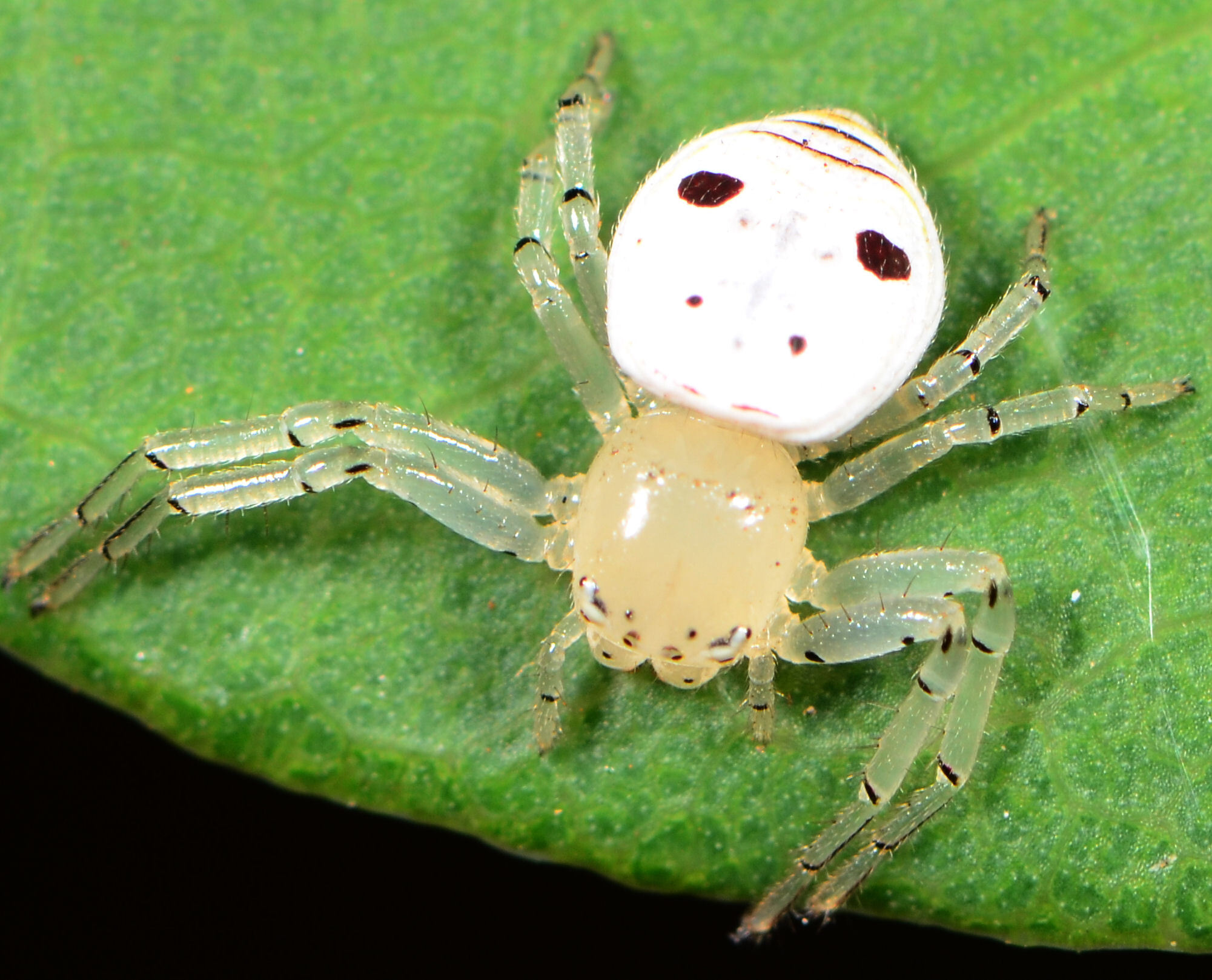
- juvenile female

Scientific classification
- Kingdom: Animalia
- Phylum: Arthropoda
- Subphylum: Chelicerata
- Class: Arachnida
- Order: Araneae
- Infraorder: Araneomorphae
- Family: Thomisidae
- Genus: Firmicus
- Species: F. bragantinus

Binomial name
- Firmicus bragantinus (Brito Capello, 1866)

Synonyms
- Thomisus bragantinus Brito Capello, 1866; Synaema quadrinotatum Simon, 1884

= Firmicus bragantinus =

White-spotted Firmicus crab spider

Species of spider

Firmicus bragantinus is a species of spider in the family Thomisidae. It is found in several African countries and is commonly known as white-spotted Firmicus crab spider.

== Distribution ==
Firmicus bragantinus is found in Sudan, Democratic Republic of the Congo, Angola, Mozambique, and South Africa.

In South Africa, it is known from the provinces KwaZulu-Natal, Limpopo, Mpumalanga, and Western Cape. It is protected in Ndumo Nature Reserve, Tembe Elephant Park, Kosi Bay Nature Reserve, iSimangaliso Wetland Park, Lekgalameetse Nature Reserve, Kruger National Park, and De Hoop Nature Reserve.

== Habitat and ecology ==
Firmicus bragantinus inhabits Fynbos, Forest, Indian Ocean Coastal Belt and Savanna biomes at altitudes ranging from 15 to 1245 m above sea level.

These free-living plant dwellers are more commonly found on trees. The species was also sampled from avocado, citrus and grapefruit orchards.

== Conservation ==
Firmicus bragantinus is listed as Least Concern by the South African National Biodiversity Institute due to its wide range and no significant threats. It is protected in six protected areas.

== Taxonomy ==
Firmicus bragantinus was originally described by Brito Capello in 1866 as Thomisus bragantinus from Angola. Simon described Synaema quadrinotatum in 1884, which was synonymized with F. bragantinus by Lessert in 1936. The species was transferred to Firmicus by Simon in 1895.
