= Firmicus bipunctatus =

Ethiopian green Firmicus crab spider

Scientific classification
- Kingdom: Animalia
- Phylum: Arthropoda
- Subphylum: Chelicerata
- Class: Arachnida
- Order: Araneae
- Infraorder: Araneomorphae
- Family: Thomisidae
- Genus: Firmicus
- Species: F. bipunctatus

Binomial name
- Firmicus bipunctatus Caporiacco, 1941

Species of spider

Firmicus bipunctatus is a species of spider in the family Thomisidae. It is found in several African countries and is commonly known as Ethiopian green Firmicus crab spider.

== Distribution ==
Firmicus bipunctatus is found in Ethiopia, Angola, Cameroon, Congo Republic, Mozambique, Sudan, and South Africa.

In South Africa, it is known from provinces Eastern Cape, Free State, Gauteng, and KwaZulu-Natal. It is protected in Cwebe Nature Reserve, Kloofendal Nature Reserve, Ndumo Nature Reserve, and Kosi Bay Nature Reserve.

== Habitat and ecology ==
Firmicus bipunctatus inhabits the Indian Ocean Coastal Belt, Thicket and Savanna biomes at altitudes ranging from 10 to 1780 m above sea level.

These free-living plant dwellers are more commonly found on trees.

== Conservation ==
Firmicus bipunctatus is listed as Least Concern by the South African National Biodiversity Institute due to its wide geographical range. It is protected in five protected areas.

== Etymology ==
The species epithet bipunctatus means "two-spotted" in Latin.

== Taxonomy ==
Firmicus bipunctatus was described by Caporiacco in 1941 from Ethiopia.
