= Cornelis Easton =

Dutch journalist and astronomer

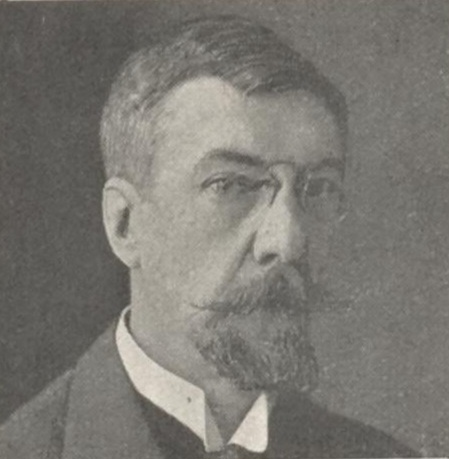
Cornelis Easton

Cornelis Easton (10 September 1864 – 3 June 1929) was a Dutch journalist and amateur astronomer who wrote popular material on astronomy and climatology apart from giving lectures. As a journalist he worked with the Nieuwe Rotterdamsche Courant (1895–1906), Nieuws van den Dag (1906–1923), and Haagsche Post (from 1923). In his first book, he was among the first to postulate a spiral structure for the Milky Way galaxy in which he located the Solar System on the edge. A street in Dordrecht is named after him.

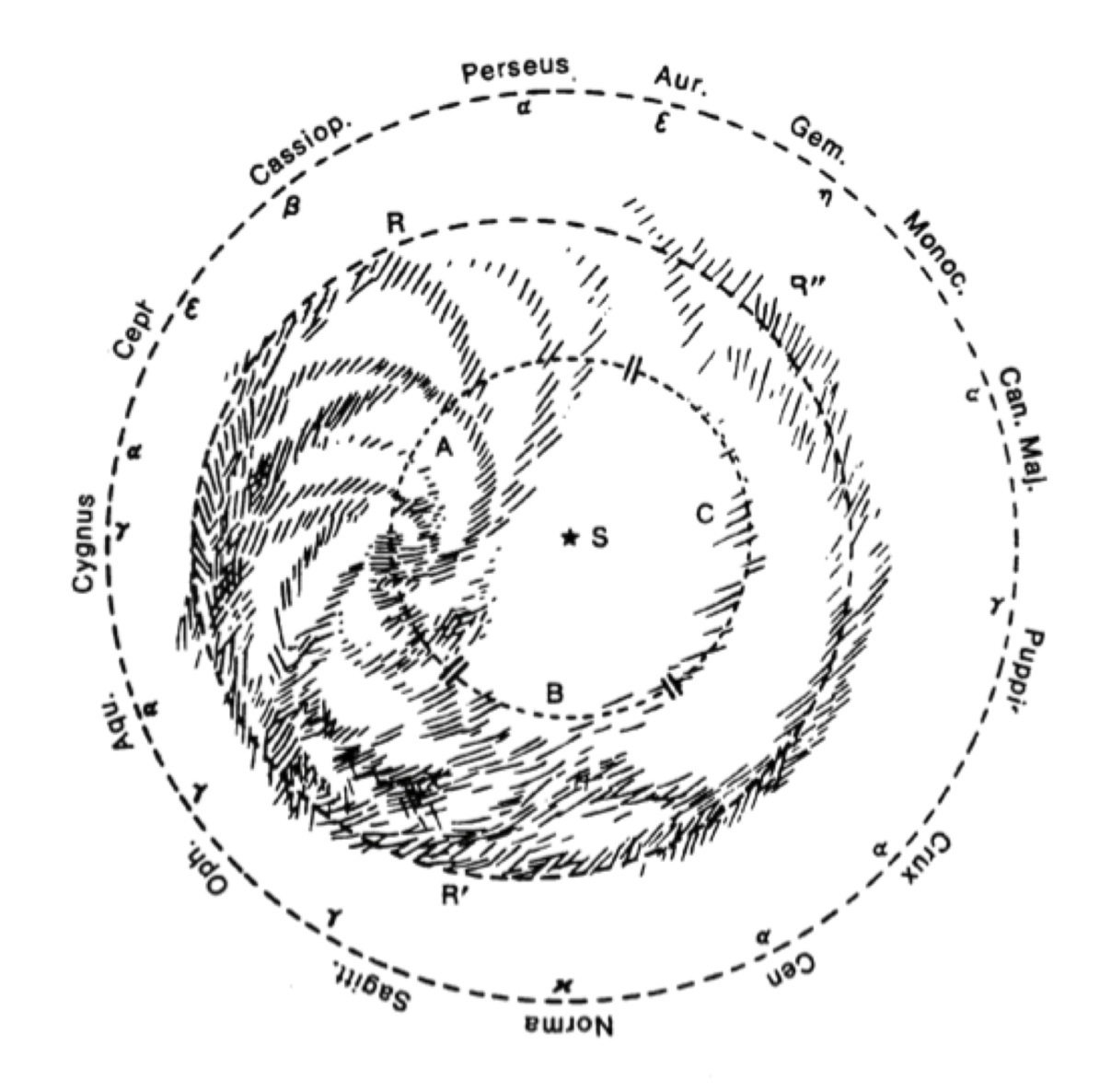
Easton's 1900 illustration of the Milky Way

Easton was born in Dordrecht where his father Johannes Jacobus was a captain in the Dutch East India Company and his mother Margrieta Wilhelmina was the daughter of a printer. He went to the local HBS (school) where he became interested in astronomy after observing the aperiodic Comet Coggia discovered on April 17, 1874, by Jérôme Coggia (1849–1919). He was greatly influenced by Jules Verne's Journey to the Moon and Popular Astronomy by Nicolas-Camille Flammarion (1842–1925). While still in high school he founded the Société Flammarion in Dordrecht in 1880 which had three members. He then went to the Polytechnicum Delft in 1881. He became more interested in astronomy and compiled star charts and was encouraged to publish his notes by H.G. van de Sande Bakhuyzen (1838–1923), professor of astronomy at Leiden University. He was assisted in his research by Anton Pannekoek (1873–1960), who was a student at Leiden University. This led to his 1893 book La Voie Lactee dans l'hemisphere boreal, in which he provided drawing and diagrams of the Milky Way and suggested a spiral structure for stellar system. He placed the Solar System near the edge of the system and the center of the system in the direction of Cygnus.

While working as a journalist and editor at a newspaper. He also published several other works on galaxies and nebulae, which led to an honorary doctoral degree from the University of Groningen in 1903 on the recommendation of Jacobus Cornelis Kapteyn (1851–1922). He also took a special interest in periodic phenomena, climate and geography. His book Les hivers dans l'Europe occidentale, (1928) was a statistical study of climate in Western Europe which suggested an 89-year cycle of severe winters. Through his writings in newspapers, he helped popularize astronomy. He died at the Hague, a street in Dordrecht is named after him. Easton married Elizabeth Theresia Visser in 1891 at Rotterdam and they had two children.
