= Elsa van Dien =

Dutch astronomer (1914–2007)

- Born: 12 July 1914; Paramaribo, Suriname
- Died: 15 October 2007 (aged 93); Amsterdam, Netherlands
- Other name: Elsa van Albada-van Dien
- Education: University of Amsterdam, Radcliffe College
- Occupation: astronomer
- Scientific career
- Fields: Astrophysics, Variable Stars
- Workplaces: University of Amsterdam, Harvard, Dominion Astrophysical Observatory, Bosscha Observatory
- Doctoral advisor: Donald Howard Menzel

Elsa van Dien (12 July 1914 – 15 October 2007) was an astronomer. She received her Ph.D. from Harvard University. She married Gale Bruno van Albada who was also an astronomer.

== Biography ==
Elsa van Dien was born in Paramaribo (Surinam) on 12 July 1914. She was the daughter of Rebecca da Silva and Gerrit van Dien. The family moved to the Netherlands in 1923. Van Dien began studying astronomy at the University of Amsterdam in 1932. She also registered at the University of Leiden (The Netherlands) in 1935, to have access to its observatory. She was later encouraged to obtain her doctorate at Harvard University.

After her studies, Van Dien started to teach at the Gemeentelijk Lyceum in Zaandam. On 21 November 1940, she was fired for being Jewish. When the deportations started, she went into hiding at reverend J.C.S. Locher in Leiden, and managed to survive the war.

Van Dien was awarded a scholarship by Radcliffe College for September 1939, but due to the Second World War she could only commence her PhD there in September 1945, also with support of the American Association of University Women (AAUW). Her thesis, supervised by Donald Menzel, discussed the Stark effect in the Balmer lines of early type stars.

After her PhD, she initially stayed at the Dominion Astrophysical Observatory in Victoria, Canada. In 1948 she moved back to the Netherlands. In August 1948 she was appointed at the Bosscha Observatory near Bandung, Indonesia; where she aided in the rehabilitation of the Observatory, along with the creation of their Schmidt telescope. The Observatory suffered serious damage in the aftermath of a military occupation. There she met and married Gale Bruno van Albada, who took interest in the telescope project. She continued her astronomical research until 1958, when the family returned to the Netherlands. She edited the Dutch journal Wetenschap en Samenleving from 1965 to 1972. In the 1970s and 1980, after the death of Van Albada in 1972, she once again resumed her astronomical research.

== Sources ==
- Scientific commons entry
- Personal notes by Elsa van Dien (2000 - 2005)
