= Douglas Easton =

British epidemiologist

- Education: University of Cambridge; University of London
- Known for: Research on the genetics of breast cancer
- Awards: AACR/Susan Komen Outstanding Investigator Award for Breast Cancer Research (2008)
- Scientific career
- Fields: Cancer epidemiology Genetic epidemiology
- Workplaces: University of Cambridge
- Thesis: Some problems in the genetic epidemiology of cancer (1992)

Douglas F. Easton FRS FMedSci is a British epidemiologist who conducts research on the genetics of human cancers. He is Professor of Genetic Epidemiology and Centre for Cancer Genetic Epidemiology at the University of Cambridge. He founded Cambridge's Cancer Research UK Genetic Epidemiology Unit in 1995, and was a Principal Research Fellow there from 2001 to 2011. He is a Professorial Fellow of Homerton College, Cambridge.

== Research ==
Easton's research focuses on identifying single-nucleotide polymorphisms that increase the risk of common human cancers, in part through the use of genome-wide association studies. In 2007, he and his colleagues reported that they had found four genes associated with breast cancer, based on a study of almost 50,000 women. The gene with the strongest association with breast cancer risk was FGFR2; women with two copies of the gene's high-risk allele had a 60% increased risk of breast cancer. This finding was described by New Scientist as "...the most significant advance in the genetics of breast cancer since researchers implicated the genes BRCA1 and BRCA2". He has since published additional research identifying genes associated with breast cancer risk.

== Honors and awards ==
Easton was elected a Fellow of the Academy of Medical Sciences in 2002. In 2008, the American Association for Cancer Research chose him to receive its inaugural Outstanding Investigator Award in Breast Cancer Research in recognition of his research on the genetics of breast cancer. In 2019 (March 14), the Karolinska Institutet in Stockholm, Sweden awarded him an honorary Doctorate of Medicine. In 2022, he was elected a Fellow of the Royal Society.
