= Krogh (crater) =

Crater on the Moon

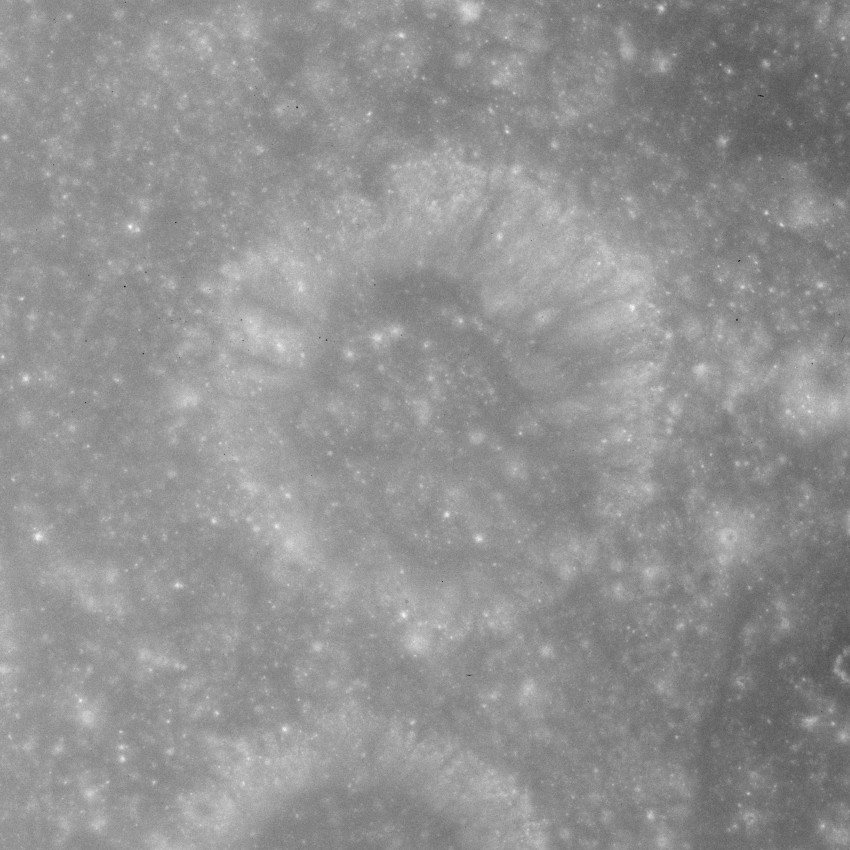
- Apollo 15 image
- Coordinates: 9.4°N 65.7°E
- Diameter: 20 km
- Colongitude: 295° at sunrise
- Eponym: August Krogh

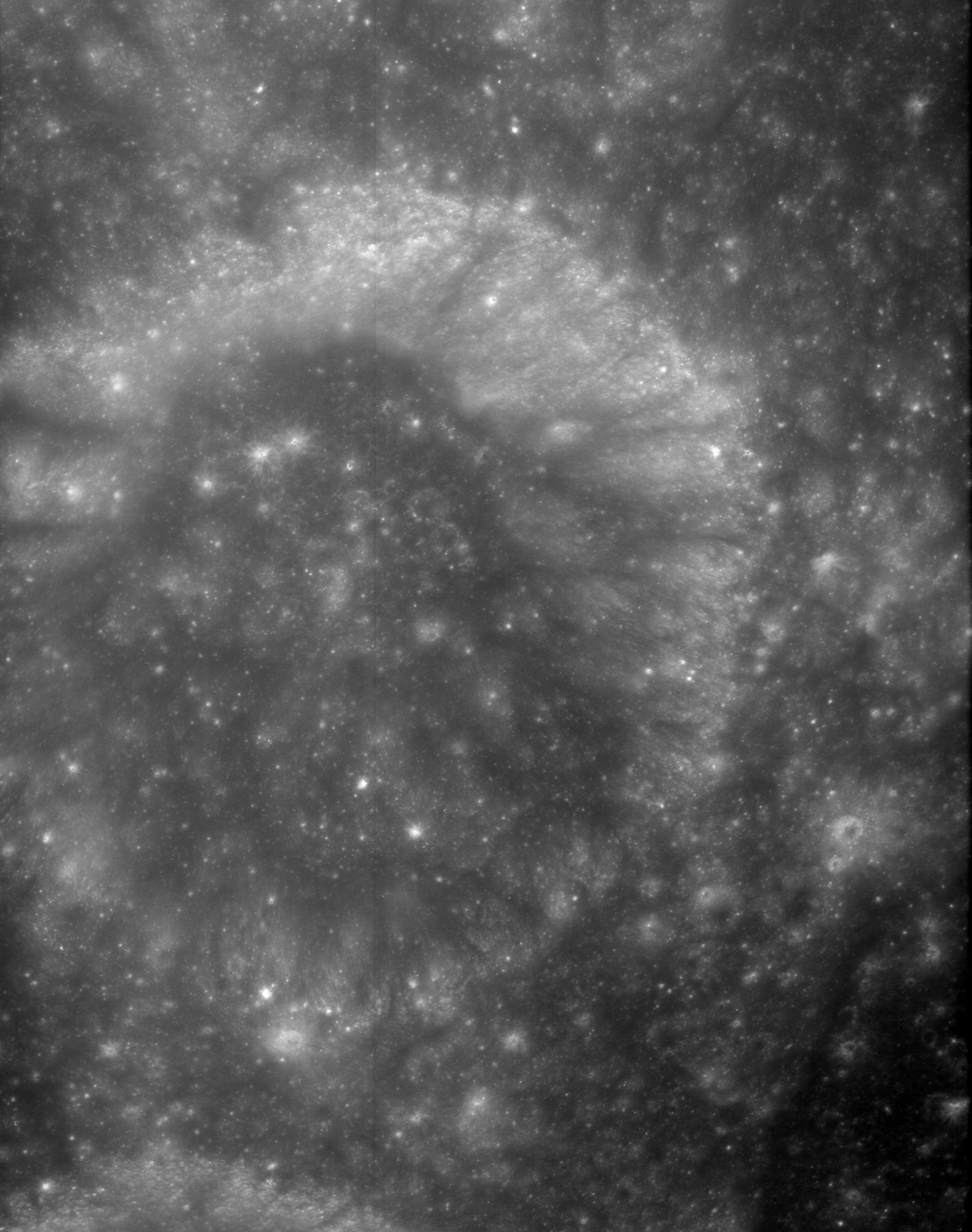
Apollo 17 image

Krogh is a small lunar impact crater that is located in the eastern part of the Moon, to the southeast of the crater Auzout. It was named after Danish zoologist, physiologist and Nobel laureate August Krogh. This crater was previously designated Auzout B. The crater is roughly circular and bowl-shaped, with an inner wall that is wider in the north than the south. It is otherwise an undistinguished formation.
