= Julius Firmicus Maternus =

4th century Latin writer and astrologer

Julius Firmicus Maternus was a Roman Latin writer and astrologer, who received a pagan classical education that made him conversant with Greek; he lived in the reign of Constantine I (306 to 337 AD) and his successors. His triple career made him a public advocate, an astrologer and finally a Christian apologist. The explicit, or end-tag, of the sole surviving manuscript of his De errore profanarum religionum ("On the error of profane religions") gives his name as Iulius Firmicus Maternus V C, identifying him as a vir clarissimus and a member of the senatorial class. He was also author of the most extensive surviving text of Roman astrology, Matheseos libri octo ("Eight books of astrology") written around 334–337. Manuscripts of this work identify him as "the younger" (iunior) or "the Sicilian" (Siculus). The lunar crater Firmicus was named in his honour.

The Matheseos was dedicated to the governor of Campania, Lollianus Mavortius, whose knowledge of the subject inspired Firmicus, and whose encouragement supported him during the composition of this handbook. It is among the last extensive handbooks of a "scientific" astrology that circulated in the West before the appearance of Arabic texts in the 12th century. Augustine of Hippo, drawn to astrology in his youth in the mid-fourth century, fulminated against the study's impieties, in part based on the astrologers' view that the planets were divinities, but also on rational grounds, taking, for instance, the divergent careers of twins. The Neoplatonist astrological work was first printed by Aldus Manutius in 1499, and has often been reprinted.

About the year 346 he composed De errore profanarum religionum, which he dedicated to Constantius II and Constans, the sons of Constantine, and which is still extant. He holds up to scorn the religious beliefs and practices of pagans and implores the Emperor to stamp out the old religions as a sacred duty which will be rewarded by God. In the first part (chs. 1‑17) he attacks the false objects of worship among the Oriental cults; in the second (chs. 18‑29) he discusses a number of formulae and rites connected with the mysteries, with particular attention and animus toward alleged homosexual practices, recovering in a certain way the contempt that the senators had at the time of the Republic to the Hellenization of the Roman religion and culture.

For 19th-century readers, De errore profanarum religionum provided such a sharp contrast with Firmicus' book on astrology (commonly referred to as the Matheseos) that the two works were generally attributed to different writers. However, Clifford Herschel Moore soundly identified the single authorship of the two works, by idiosyncratic choices of vocabulary and syntax, in a dissertation overseen by Eduard Wölfflin (1897). Theodor Mommsen has shown that the Matheseos was composed in the year 336 and not in 354 as was formerly held, thus making it an earlier work than De errore profanarum religionum; modern readers who find astrology incompatible with Early Christianity argue that it would have been written prior to Firmicus' conversion to Christianity.

The Christian work is preserved in a single manuscript from the Bibliotheca Palatina. It was first printed at Strasbourg in 1562, and has been reprinted several times, both separately and combined with the polemical writings of Minucius Felix, Cyprian or Arnobius.

== Bibliography ==
=== Editions ===
- Matheseos libri VIII, 2 vols, edited by W. Kroll and F. Skutsch, Stuttgart, Teubner, 1968.

=== Translations ===
- De errore profanarum religionum, translated by Clarence A. Forbes as The Error of the Pagan Religions, Newman Press, 1970 (Ancient Christian Writers, 37). ISBN 9780809100392
- Ancient Astrology: Theory and Practice. Matheseos Libri VIII by Firmicus Maternus, translated by Jean Rhys Bram, Park Ridge, Noyes Press, 1975.
- Mathesis, edited and translated by James Herschel Holden, Tempe, Az., A.F.A., Inc., 2011.
