= Robert Easton =

Robert Easton may refer to:

- Robert Easton (actor) (1930–2011), American actor and dialect coach
- Robert Easton (bass) (1898–1987), British bass singer
- Robert Easton (athlete) (born 1960/61), Canadian Paralympic athlete

== See also ==
- Robert Easton Burns (1805–1863), Canadian lawyer and judge
