= 2019 van Albada =

Main-belt asteroid

Discovery
- Discovered by: H. van Gent
- Discovery site: Johannesburg Obs. (Leiden Southern Station)
- Discovery date: 28 September 1935

Designations
- Named after: Gale Bruno van Albada (Dutch astronomer)
- Alternative designations: 1935 SX_{1} · 1931 JN; 1941 HS · 1964 DG; 1971 HB · 1975 ND; 1975 PL · A911 KD
- Minor planet category: main-belt · Flora

Orbital characteristics
- Epoch 4 September 2017 (JD 2458000.5)
- Uncertainty parameter 0
- Observation arc: 85.90 yr (31,374 days)
- Aphelion: 2.6116 AU
- Perihelion: 1.8701 AU
- Semi-major axis: 2.2409 AU
- Eccentricity: 0.1655
- Orbital period (sidereal): 3.35 yr (1,225 days)
- Mean anomaly: 221.81°
- Mean motion: 0° 17^{m} 37.68^{s} / day
- Inclination: 4.0435°
- Longitude of ascending node: 252.20°
- Argument of perihelion: 24.949°

Physical characteristics
- Dimensions: 7.53±0.51 km 7.865±0.064 km 8.009±0.165 km 9.41 km (calculated)
- Synodic rotation period: 2.583±0.0029 h (R); 2.72±0.01 h 2.72±0.03 h 2.729±0.001 h 2.730±0.0029 h (S)
- Geometric albedo: 0.496±0.040; 0.411±0.093; 0.4823±0.0788; 0.24 (assumed)
- Spectral type: SMASS = S · S
- Absolute magnitude (H): 11.9 · 12.164±0.001 (R) · 12.20 · 12.3 · 12.71±0.48 · 12.822±0.001 (S)

2019 van Albada, provisional designation 1935 SX_{1}, is a stony Florian asteroid and former spacecraft target from the inner regions of the asteroid belt, approximately 8 kilometers in diameter. It was discovered on 28 September 1935, by Dutch astronomer Hendrik van Gent at Leiden Southern Station, annex to the Johannesburg Observatory in South Africa. The asteroid was later named after Gale Bruno van Albada.

== Orbit and classification ==
van Albada is a member of the Flora family, one of the largest collisional populations of stony asteroids. It orbits the Sun in the inner main-belt at a distance of 1.9–2.6 AU once every 3 years and 4 months (1,225 days). Its orbit has an eccentricity of 0.17 and an inclination of 4° with respect to the ecliptic.

In May 1911, the asteroid was first identified as A911 KD at the discovering Johannesburg Observatory. The body's observation arc begins at Lowell Observatory in 1931, four years prior to its official discovery observation.

== Former flyby target ==
van Albada was considered as a flyby target of the NEAR unmanned robotic spacecraft mission in the 1990s. NEAR eventually launched, but visited 253 Mathilde and 433 Eros. There is only a small number of minor planets formerly targeted for spacecraft visitation.

== Physical characteristics ==
In the SMASS classification, van Albada is a common S-type asteroid. It has also been characterized as a stony asteroid by Pan-STARRS photometric survey.

=== Lightcurves ===
Between 2012 and 2015, several rotational lightcurves of van Albada were obtained from photometric observations by astronomers Pierre Antonini, Junda Liu, Raoul Behrend and Jean Strajnic, as well as by astronomers at the Palomar Transient Factory in California. Lightcurve analysis gave a short rotation period between 2.72 and 2.73 hours with a brightness variation between 0.13 and 0.20 magnitude (U=2+/2+/2+/2/2).

=== Diameter and albedo ===
According to the surveys carried out by the NEOWISE mission of NASA's Wide-field Infrared Survey Explorer, van Albada measures between 7.53 and 8.009 kilometers in diameter and its surface has a high albedo between 0.411 and 0.496.

The Collaborative Asteroid Lightcurve Link assumes an albedo of 0.24 – derived from 8 Flora, the largest member and namesake of the Flora family – and calculates a diameter of 9.41 kilometers based on an absolute magnitude of 12.3.

== Naming ==
This minor planet was named in memory of Dutch astronomer Gale Bruno van Albada (1911–1972), who was director of the Bosscha Observatory and of the Astronomical Institute at Amsterdam. The approved naming citation was published by the Minor Planet Center on 28 April 1991 (M.P.C. 18135). The lunar crater Van Albada is also named in his honor.
