= Peter Easton (cricketer) =

Australian cricketer (born 1936)

Personal information
- Born: 21 October 1936 (age 90); Brisbane, Queensland, Australia
- Source: Cricinfo, 3 October 2020

Peter Easton (born 21 October 1936) is an Australian cricketer. He played in one first-class match for Queensland in 1959/60.

== See also ==
- List of Queensland first-class cricketers
