= Gale Bruno van Albada =

Dutch astronomer (1912–1972)

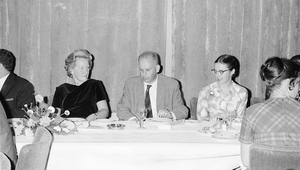
- Participants at an astronomy symposium at Utrecht University in 1963. From left to right Doetie de Jager, Gale Bruno van Albada, Anne Underhill.
- Born: 28 March 1912; Amsterdam, Netherlands
- Died: 18 December 1972 (aged 60)
- Education: University of Amsterdam
- Scientific career
- Fields: Astronomy

Gale Bruno van Albada (28 March 1912, Amsterdam – 18 December 1972, Amsterdam) was a Dutch astronomer, known for his orbital observations of binary stars and studies on the evolution of galaxy clusters.

== Biography ==
Van Albada obtained his Ph.D. with Antonie Pannekoek at the University of Amsterdam in 1945. He shared Pannekoek's communist ideologies and back in the 1930s his brother Piet van Albada had been an associate of Marinus van der Lubbe.

Van Albada was director of the Bosscha Observatory on Java from May 1949 to July 1958. On August 1, 1950, he married the astronomer Dr. Elsa van Dien (Paramaribo, 12 July 1914 - Amsterdam, 15 October 2007) who was working at the Bosscha Observatory at the time. The couple had three children, one of whom became an astronomer.

Because of the political situation the family had to leave Java in July 1958. In 1960, Van Albada succeeded Herman Zanstra as head of the department of astronomy at the University of Amsterdam.

In 1951 Van Albada became member of the Royal Netherlands Academy of Arts and Sciences, he resigned in 1958.

== Honors ==
The lunar crater van Albada and the main-belt asteroid 2019 van Albada are named after him.
