= Auzout (crater) =

Crater on the Moon

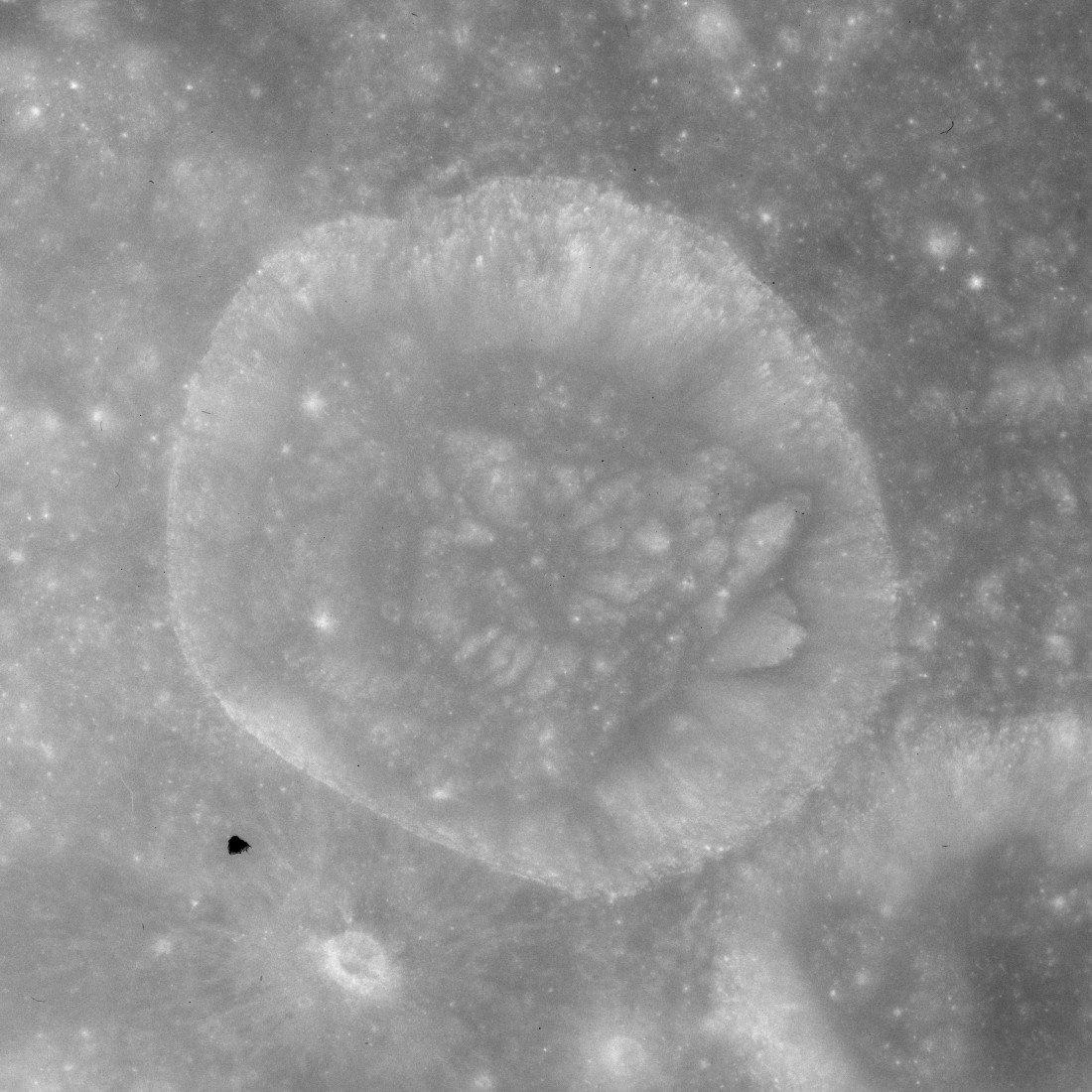
- Apollo 15 image
- Coordinates: 10.21°N 64.01°E
- Diameter: 32.92 km (20.46 mi)
- Depth: 3.85 km (2.39 mi)
- Colongitude: 327° at sunrise
- Eponym: Adrien Auzout

Auzout is a lunar impact crater that is located to the southeast of the Mare Crisium, near the eastern limb of the Moon. Attached to the southern rim is the smaller crater van Albada. To the east-northeast is the large Condorcet.

The Auzout crater is not especially remarkable, although it does possess a central mountain. The upper crater wall appears rich in the mineral ilmenite, although it is not observed in the higher ground of the surrounding terrain. There is a ~340 m crater on the floor, which appears to have triggered boulder falls from the walls of Auzout crater.

This crater is named after French astronomer Adrien Auzout (1622–1691), although it is listed as 'Azout' in some sources. The designation was officially adopted by the International Astronomical Union in 1961.

== Satellite craters ==
By convention these features are identified on lunar maps by placing the letter on the side of the crater midpoint that is closest to Auzout.

Auzout	Coordinates	Diameter, km
C	8.79°N 65.27°E	17
D	9.35°N 62.43°E	12
E	9.57°N 60.66°E	17
L	8.34°N 61.30°E	8
R	8.70°N 60.04°E	8
U	9.39°N 61.05°E	8
V	9.34°N 61.31°E	8

The following craters have been renamed by the IAU.

- Auzout A — See van Albada (crater).
- Auzout B — See Krogh (crater).

== Gallery ==
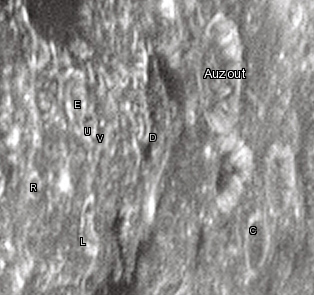
Auzout crater and its satellite craters

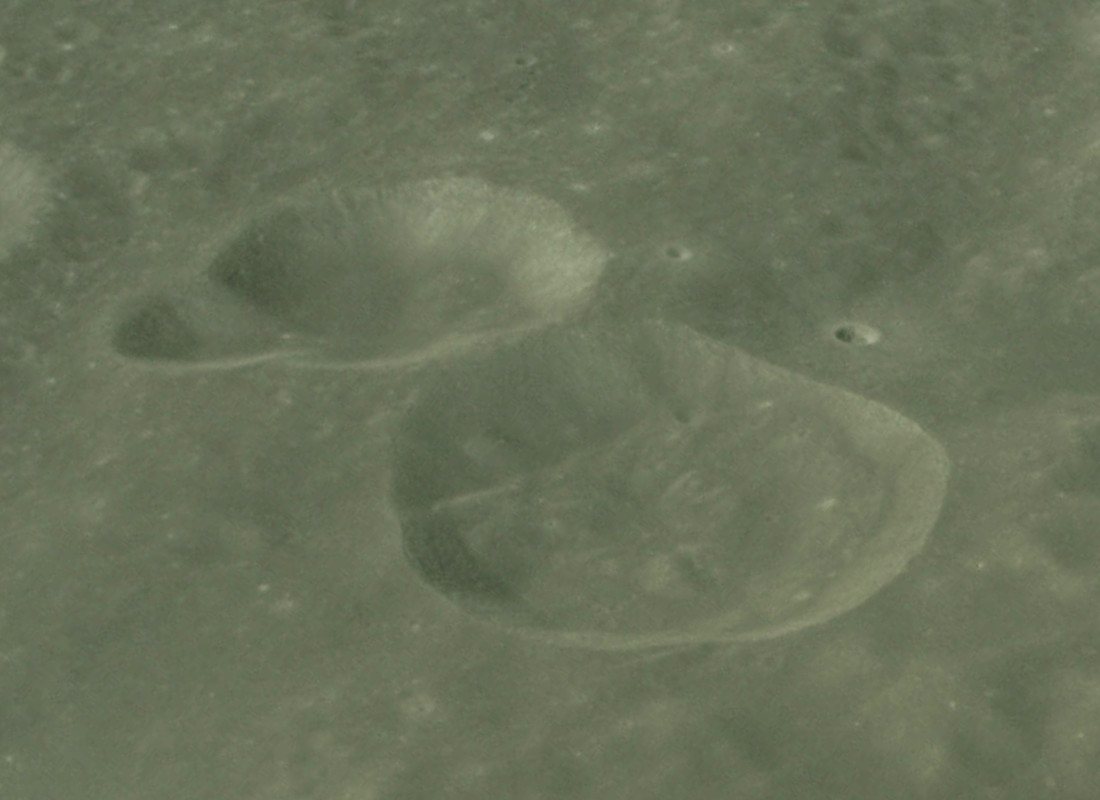
Oblique view of van Albada (upper left) and Auzout (lower right), from Apollo 17

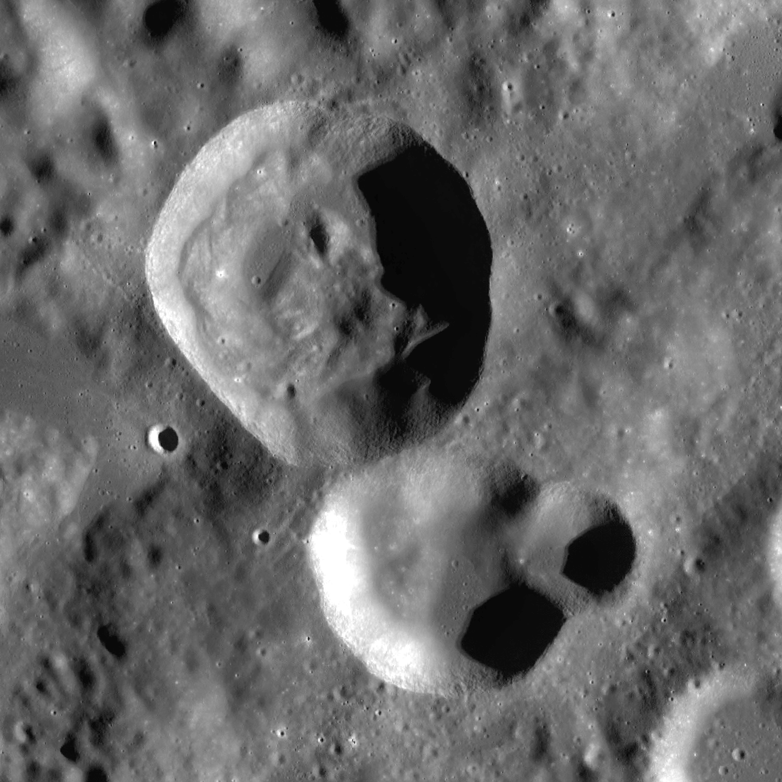
LRO image
