= Penelope Easton =

American dietician (1923–2020)

Penelope S. Easton (February 23, 1923 – November 12, 2020) was an American dietician, nutritionist, and educator. She served as the founding department chairperson and later professor emeritus of the Department of Dietetics and Nutrition in the Robert Stempel College of Public Health and Social Work at Florida International University.

== Early life and education ==
Easton was born February 23, 1923, and was raised in Craftsbury, Vermont. She attended the University of Vermont, receiving a B.S. in 1944. Easton received her master's in public health from the University of Michigan in 1948, and her Ph.D. from the University of Southern Illinois.

She was a commissioned officer in the United States Army, working first in San Antonio, Texas and then in Alaska where she worked as a nutritionist for native populations.

== Career ==
Easton taught at Indiana State University from 1963 to 1971. She then moved to Florida International University to initiate its dietetics program, where she taught classes on the American diet. Easton published two books in her 90s, Learning to Like Muktuk: An Unlikely Explorer in Territorial Alaska (2014), and Fleeing the Depression: Finding Refuge in World War II (2017).

Easton died November 12, 2020, at age 97.

== Honors and awards ==
In 1982, Easton was named Florida's outstanding dietician for the year by the Florida Dietetic Association.
