= William Easton =

William Easton may refer to:

- William Easton (footballer) (born 1986), Scottish association football player
- William Easton (artist), Scottish artist, writer and curator
- William Easton (tennis), American tennis player
- William Bigelow Easton, mathematician
- Billy Easton (1904–c. 1982), English association football player
- William Easton, a fictional character from the Saw film franchise
- William Edgar Easton (1861–1936), American playwright and journalist
