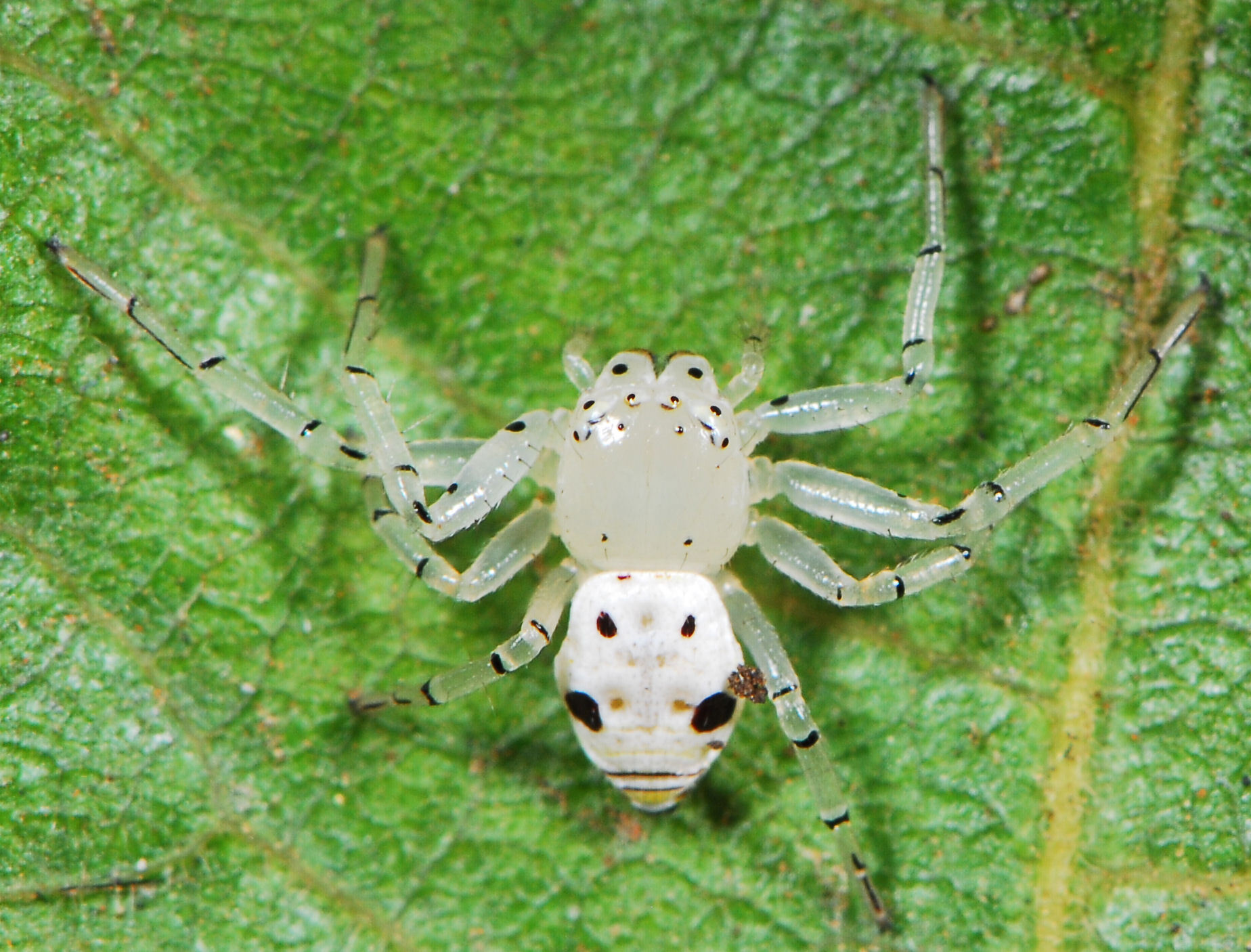
- adult female F. bragantinus from South Africa

Scientific classification
- Kingdom: Animalia
- Phylum: Arthropoda
- Subphylum: Chelicerata
- Class: Arachnida
- Order: Araneae
- Infraorder: Araneomorphae
- Family: Thomisidae
- Genus: Firmicus; Simon, 1895

Type species
- F. bragantinus (Brito Capello, 1866)

Species
- 17, see text

= Firmicus (spider) =

Genus of spiders

Firmicus is a genus of crab spiders that was first described by Eugène Simon in 1895.

== Distribution ==
Species in this genus are mainly found in Africa. One species is endemic to Vietnam, and another reaches into Spain and France from Algeria. F. dewitzi is found from Egypt to Iran.

=== Life style ===
Firmicus are free-living plant dwellers more commonly found on trees.

=== Description ===
Females and males are 4 to 6 mm in total length, with males only slightly smaller.

This genus can be recognised by their flattened body that is frequently elongated. The carapace is flattened and narrower in the eye region. The tubercles of anterior lateral eyes are shallow and clearly larger than posterior lateral eye tubercles. The anterior lateral eyes are larger than the other eyes. The anterior eye row is straight with the eyes equidistantly spaced while the posterior eye row is recurved. The posterior median eyes are distinctly closer to each other than to posterior lateral eyes.

The abdomen is flattened and slightly elongated. Legs I and II are long, thick and spinous.

== Species ==
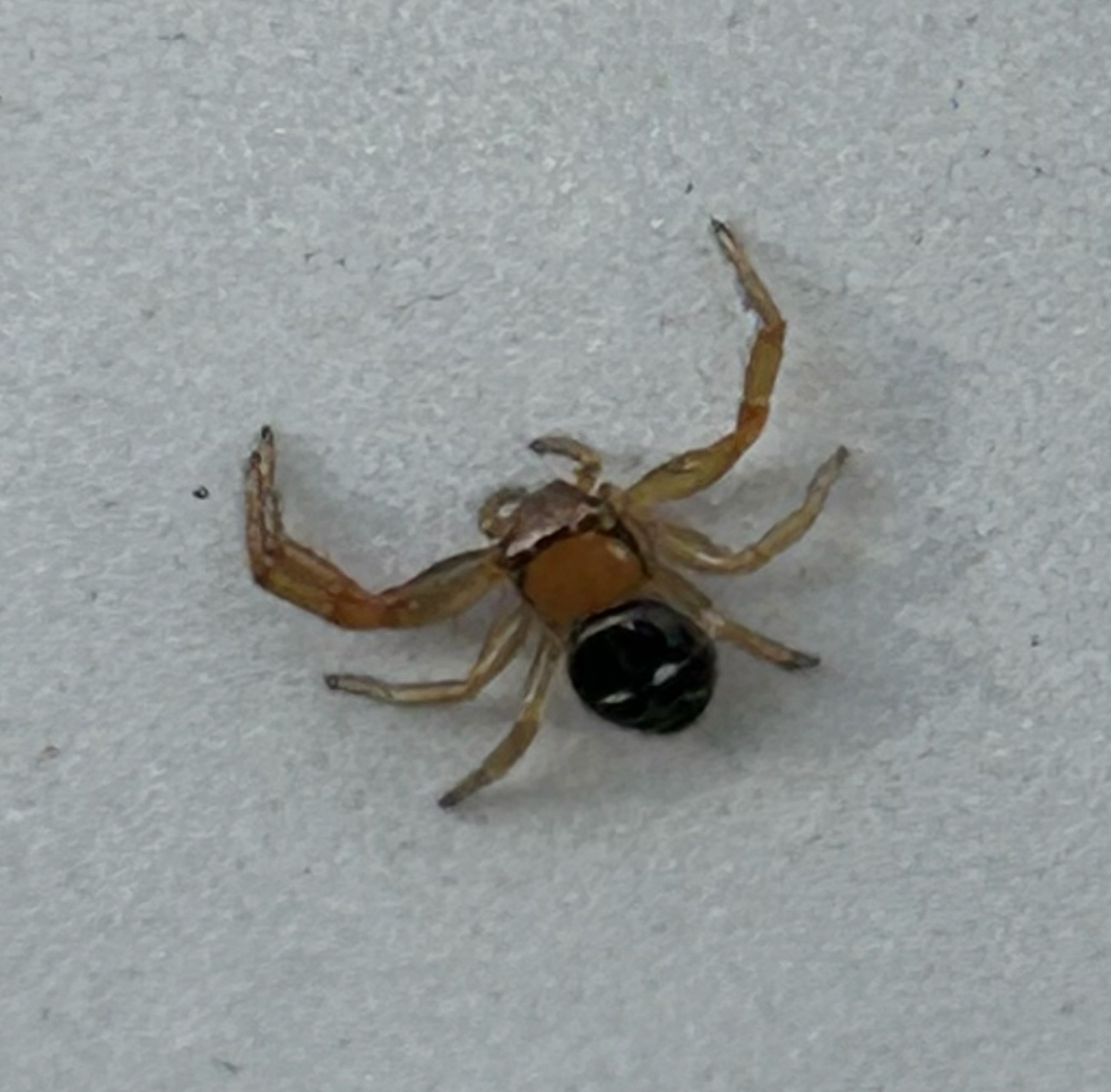
F. abnormis

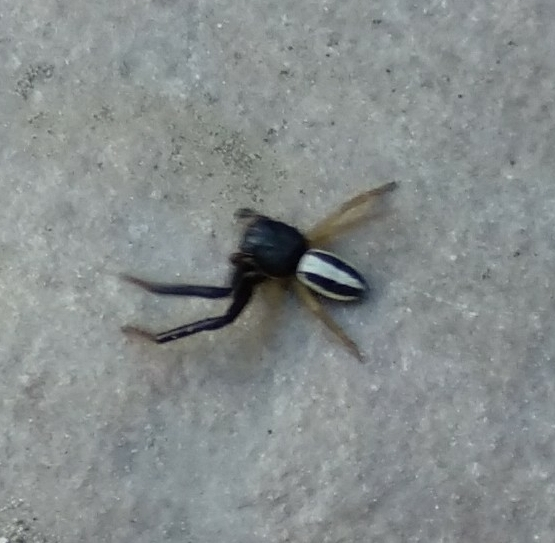
F. bivittatus

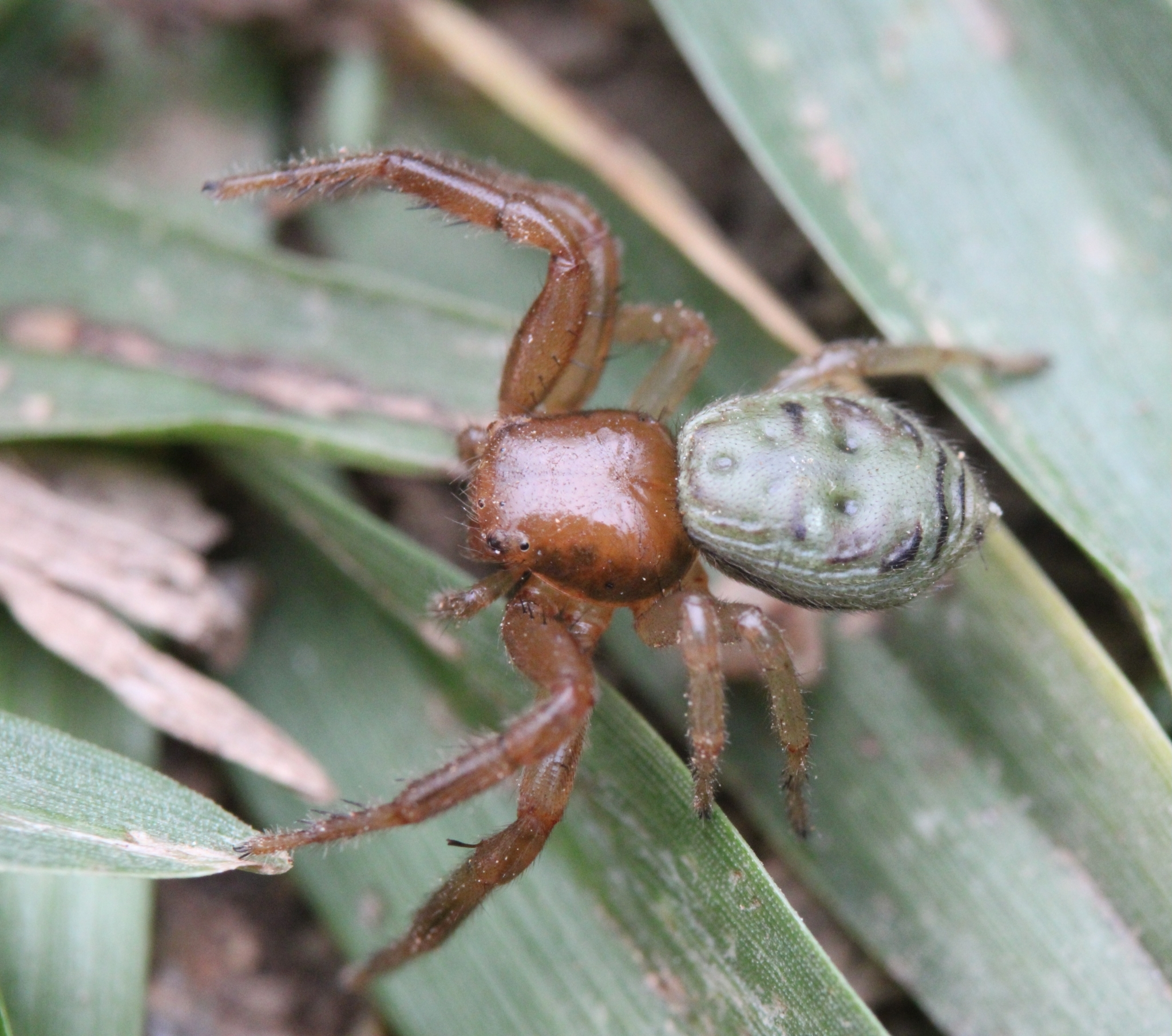
F. campestratus

As of October 2025, this genus includes seventeen species and two subspecies:

- Firmicus abnormis (Lessert, 1923) – South Africa
- Firmicus arushae Caporiacco, 1947 – Tanzania
- Firmicus aurantipes Jézéquel, 1966 – Ivory Coast
- Firmicus biguttatus Caporiacco, 1940 – Ethiopia
- Firmicus bimaculatus (Simon, 1886) – Madagascar
- Firmicus bipunctatus Caporiacco, 1941 – Ethiopia, Sudan, Cameroon, DR Congo, Angola, Mozambique, South Africa
- Firmicus bivittatus Simon, 1895 – Spain, France, Algeria
- Firmicus bragantinus (Brito Capello, 1866) – Sudan, DR Congo, Angola, Mozambique, South Africa (type species)
- Firmicus campestratus Simon, 1907 – Gabon, DR Congo
  - F. c. faradjensis (Lessert, 1928) – DR Congo
  - F. c. ogoueensis Simon, 1907 – Gabon
- Firmicus dewitzi Simon, 1899 – Egypt, Israel, Iran
- Firmicus duriusculus Simon, 1903 – Vietnam
- Firmicus haywoodae Jézéquel, 1964 – Ivory Coast
- Firmicus insularis (Blackwall, 1877) – Seychelles
- Firmicus lentiginosus (Simon, 1886) – DR Congo, near Zambezi River (no details)
- Firmicus paecilipes Caporiacco, 1940 – Ethiopia
- Firmicus strandi Caporiacco, 1947 – Tanzania
- Firmicus werneri Simon, 1906 – Uganda

In synonymy:

- F. marginatus Simon, 1897 = Firmicus insularis (Blackwall, 1877)

== See also ==
- List of Thomisidae species
