= John Easton (disambiguation) =

John Easton (c. 1624–1705) was a politician in colonial Rhode Island

John Easton may also refer to:

- John Easton (philatelist) (1895–1967), British philatelist
- John Easton (baseball) (1933–2001), American baseball player
- John J. Easton Jr. (born 1943), American attorney and Vermont Attorney General
- John Murray Easton (1889–1975), Scottish architect

== See also ==
- John Easton Mills (1796–1847), mayor
