= Doctoral advisor =

University faculty member

A doctoral advisor (also dissertation director, dissertation advisor; or doctoral supervisor) is a member of a university faculty whose role is to guide graduate students who are candidates for a doctorate, helping them select coursework, as well as shaping, refining and directing the students' choice of sub-discipline in which they will be examined or on which they will write a dissertation. Students generally choose advisors based on their areas of interest within their discipline, their desire to work closely with particular graduate faculty, and the willingness and availability of those faculty to work with them.

In some countries, the student's advisor is the chair of the dissertation committee or the examination committee. In some cases, though, the person who serves those roles may be different from the faculty member who has most closely advised the student. For instance, in the Dutch academic system, only full professors (hoogleraren) and associate professors (since 2017) have the "ius promovendi", the right to chair doctoral examinations. Students who have been advised by lower-ranked faculty members will have a full or associate professor as their official advisor (or promotor) and their actual advisor as co-promotor. In other countries, such as Spain, the doctoral advisor has the role of a mentor, but is not allowed to form part of the examination committee. This is a body of five experts independently selected by the rectorate among ten candidates proposed by the university's department.

An academic genealogy may be traced based on the student's doctoral advisors, going up and down the lines of academic "descent" in a manner analogous to a traditional genealogy.
