= H. G. van de Sande Bakhuyzen =

Dutch astronomer (1838–1923)

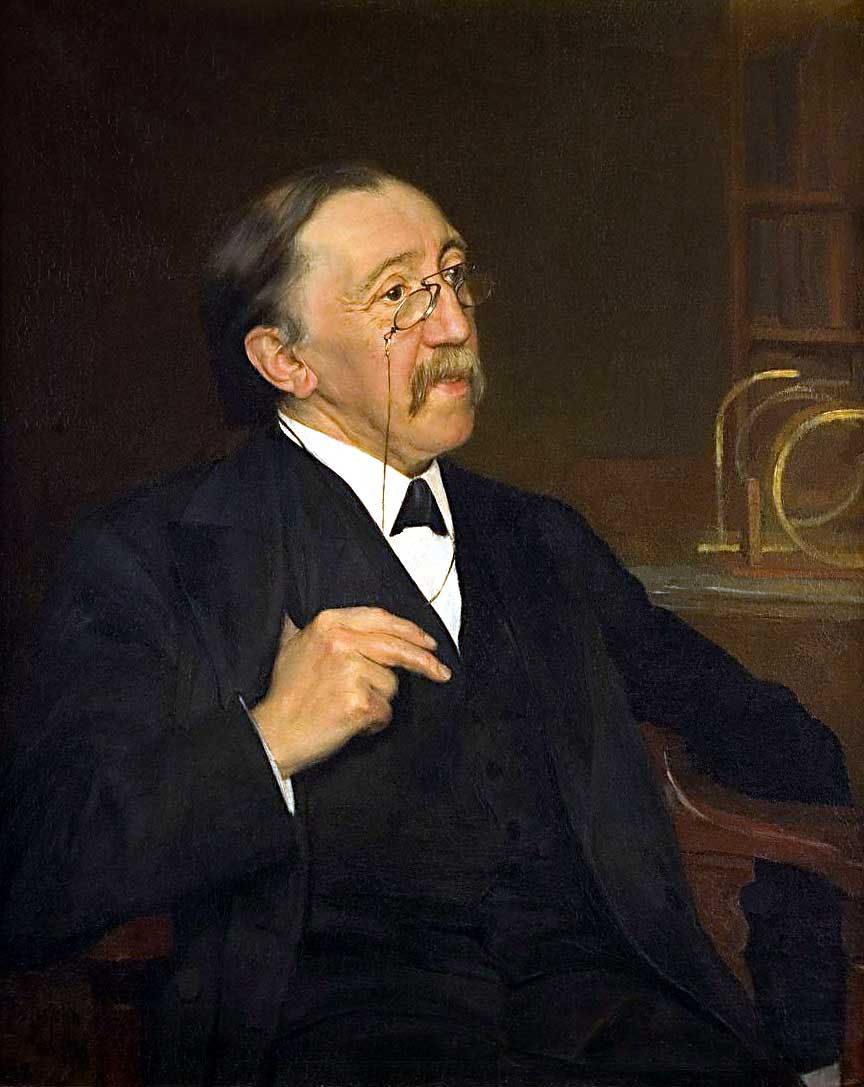
H. G. van de Sande Bakhuyzen.

Hendricus Gerardus van de Sande Bakhuyzen (2 April 1838 in The Hague – 8 January 1923 in Leiden) was a Dutch astronomer. His surname, van de Sande Bakhuyzen, is sometimes erroneously given as Backhuyzen or Bakhuysen. His first name is sometimes given as Hendrik Gerard.

He studied astronomy under Frederik Kaiser. After he got his degree, he was a high school teacher from 1864–1867, during which time he wrote a very successful textbook on mechanics. In 1867 he became a professor at the Technical College in Delft.

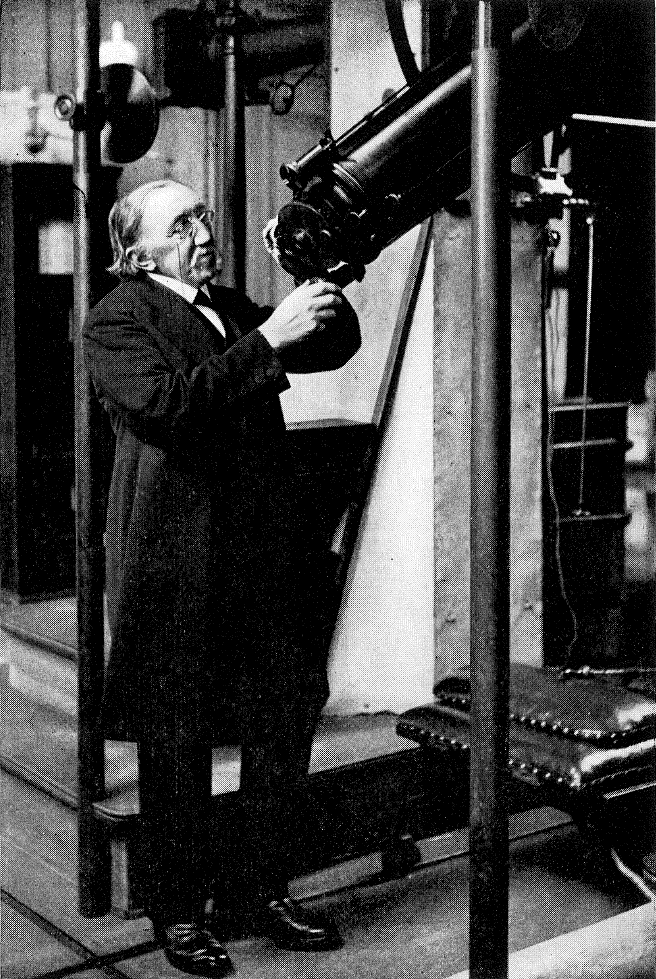
van de Sande Bakhuyzen at Leiden Observatory in 1908.

He became director of the Leiden Observatory in 1872 upon the death of Frederik Kaiser. He retired in 1908. Van de Sande Bakhuyzen became member of the Royal Netherlands Academy of Arts and Sciences in 1872.

He chose to concentrate on fundamental astronomy rather than on the then-new field of spectroscopy. He worked mainly on the observation of asteroids, but also proved the connection between a meteor shower on 27 November and the comet 3D/Biela. He also worked on geodesy.

He edited and published the Mars drawings of Johann Hieronymus Schröter in 1881, long after the latter's death.

He married Geertruida van Vollenhoven, who died in 1910. They had two daughters and a son, Adriaan, who would be mayor of Leiden from 1927 to 1941.

His brother Ernest-Frederich van de Sande Bakhuyzen was also an astronomer who worked at the Leiden Observatory.

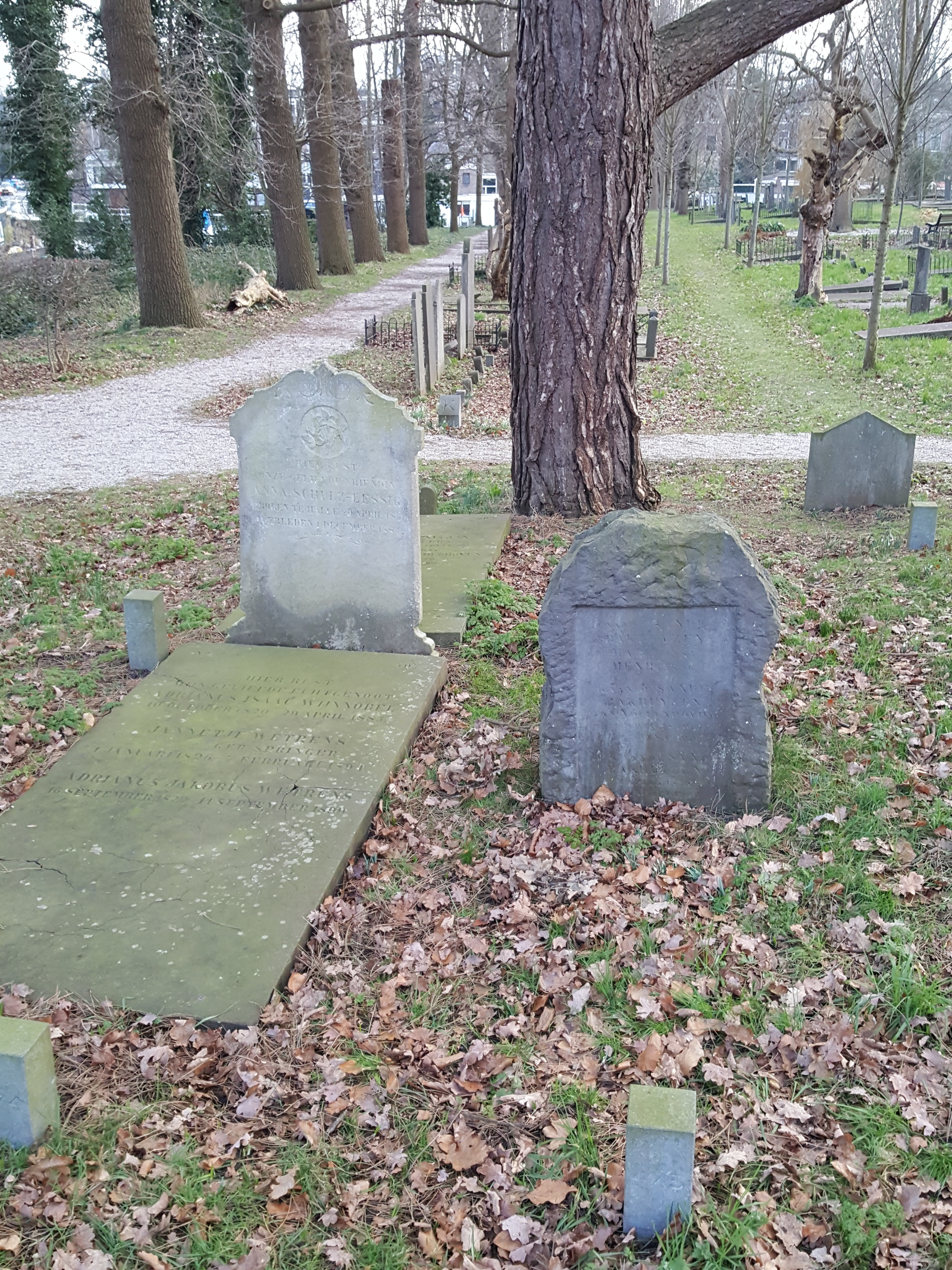
Grave of Hendricus Gerardus van de Sande Bakhuyzen (righthand side) on the Groenesteeg graveyard in Leiden, the Netherlands. Grave number 506

Bakhuysen crater (with an "s") on Mars is named for him.
