= Academic ranks in the Netherlands =

Academic ranks in the Netherlands are the titles, relative importance and power of professors, researchers, and administrative personnel held in academia.

== Overview ==
=== Academic ranks ===
Dutch title	Literal translation	Pay grade	US equivalent	UK/commonwealth equivalent
Akademiehoogleraar	Academy Professor; High teacher of the Academy			
Universiteitshoogleraar	University Professor; High teacher of the university		Distinguished or University Professor	
Hoogleraar	High teacher	H1, H2, 14+extra	Full Professor	Full Professor
Lector (From 2001 academic rank for University of Applied Sciences; before 1980 equivalent with junior full professor at research universities)	Reader	15	Full Professor	Full Professor
Universitair Hoofddocent	University head lecturer	13, 14	Associate professor	Senior Lecturer
Universitair Docent	University lecturer	11, 12	Assistant professor	Lecturer
Docent	Lecturer	10-13	Lecturer/Instructor	Tutor
Onderzoeker / Postdoc	Researcher, Postdoc	10–13	Researcher	Research fellow / (Post Doctoral) Research Associate
Assistent in Opleiding / Promovendus	Assistant in training	P	Ph.D. candidate	Ph.D. candidate
Onderzoeksassistent	Research assistant	6–9	Research assistant	Research assistant
Student-assistent	Student (enrolled in Bachelor or Master program) assistant	SA	Student teaching/research assistant	Student teaching/research assistant

=== Administrative positions ===
Dutch title	Description	Length of term	Requirements
Executive board of the university
Voorzitter raad van bestuur	CEO or president of a university	Appointed for fixed 4-year term, which can be renewed	Need not be a professor, can be appointed from outside the organisation. Comparable to vice chancellor in Commonwealth countries.
Rector Magnificus	Ceremonial head and head of research and education of a university	Appointed for fixed 4-year term, which can be renewed	Always a full professor, usually elected from within the sitting professors of the university. Comparable to chancellor in Commonwealth countries.
Leden van het college van bestuur	Additional members of the board of a university (e.g. CFO)	Appointed for fixed 4-year term, which can be renewed	Need not be a professor, can be appointed from outside the organisation
Department or Division
Decaan (Dean)	Head of research and education of a faculty	Appointed for fixed 4 year terms, which can be extended	Usually a full professor
Leerstoel houder	Leader of a research group or department (lit: teaching chair holder)	Appointed indefinitely (until mandatory retirement age)	Most commonly a full professor; when retiring or leaving a replacement will be usually sought in an open application procedure (although a university may also decide to redefine or abolish the chair at this stage).

== Professor ranks ==
=== Full professors ===
A (full) professor should have substantial research achievements and international reputation. The title professor is not protected by Dutch law.

The head of a department or of a "chair-group" within a department is a full professor. After a "chaired" professor leaves university, an open application is usually announced to replace the chair holder.

Personal chairs, are full professors created based on personal achievement but have no formal administrative function in leading a department. Personal chair are becoming increasingly familiar; and are generally promoted from the assistant or associate professor ranks in a department. If a personal chair leaves the chair ceases to exist.

Dutch universities also appoint professors occupying an endowed chair (Dutch: "bijzonder hoogleraar", literally "special professor"), often on a part-time basis. Special professors usually have their main employment somewhere else, often in industry or at a research institute or University elsewhere, although some foundations sponsor a special professor for one of the sitting associate professors. The special professor (bijzonder hoogleraar) does not get paid by the university, but receives a salary from an external organization, such as a company, an organization or a fund. Special (endowed) professors sometimes provide lectures or do research on special topics associated with their main employment. They also often supervise graduate students who may do their research at the place of the professor's main employment.

Some Dutch universities have also instituted University Professorships appointing scientific ambassadors by the university, rather than representing a department. The Royal Netherlands Academy of Arts and Sciences can sponsor an established professor to be an Academy Professor. In addition, members of the Royal Academy are selected full professor. Being elected to member of the academy is a high honor for a sitting professor.

When a full professor retires in good standing, the professor becomes professor emeritus. This allows the retired professor to keep the title professor for life. A professor emeritus is allowed to supervise doctorate theses until five years after retirement, but the use of the honorific professor is for life. Professors emeriti have no formal teaching or administrative duties and are paid no salaries (instead they receive pension payment). They are often provided with a desk and will have access to university resources for as long as the person so requests. In any event, professors who move out of the academy or retire in good standing retain the ius promovendi. (see below) for five years thereafter.

Due to the system of part-time special professors and personal chair-holders promoted from sitting staff within a department, many university research groups will have several professors.

=== Overview of all academic ranks ===
Most academic staff will have both research and teaching duties.

The ranking system of faculty with combined teaching and research tasks in Dutch universities is as follows:

- universitair docent 2, abbreviated UD2 (literal translation University lecturer rank 2. Equivalent to UK lecturer A/B, and US assistant professor - pay grade 11)
- universitair docent 1, abbreviated UD1 (literal translation University lecturer rank 1. Equivalent to UK senior lecturer, and US associate professor - pay grade 12)
- universitair hoofddocent 2, abbreviated UHD2 (literal translation University head lecturer rank 2. Equivalent to UK associate professor (reader), and US associate professor- pay grade 13)
- universitair hoofddocent 1, abbreviated UHD1 (literal translation University head lecturer rank 1. Equivalent to UK associate professor (reader), and US associate professor- pay grade 14)
- hoogleraar 2, or professor (literal translation high teacher rank 2, lowest Dutch academic rank allowed to use the title prof. Equivalent to UK professor (personal chair), and US full professor - pay grade H2).
- hoogleraar 1, or professor (literal translation high teacher rank 1. Usually department or sub department chair. Equivalent to UK professor, and US full professor - pay grade H1).

In daily practice no distinction is made between rank 1 and 2 in the Dutch ranking system (until 1986 junior full professor at a Dutch university existed, title was abolished in 1986). Since the change in the law in 2018, in some universities the ius promovendi is granted to the UHD1 rank or individuals with a proficient track record to be primary supervisor of a PhD project. Each rank increase come with a shift in pay grade. Promotion from rank 2 to rank 1 within the same function is usually easier than moving to a differently named function.

University of applied sciences appoint lectors to coordinate their (applied) research. Like a full professor, a lector coordinates a research group. In contrast to full professors (and selected associated professors), lectors are not allowed to be principal supervisor of PhD students, who always need to be under the principal guidance of a staff member of a Research University.

Several Dutch universities introduced a Tenure track system, which means that a researcher follows a trajectory from assistant professor to associate professor to full professor. During this trajectory they have to prove they are capable to be a full professor. In the last stage, just before a researcher becomes a full professor, at several universities they are called adjunct hoogleraar, which means they have almost all rights of a full professor.

=== Ius promovendi ===
Historically, a special right of a full professor in the Netherlands has been the ius promovendi, the right to supervise someone for a doctoral dissertation. From 2018 onwards, the law has changed and holder of a position with a research university appointment (effectively an experienced UD or UHD or a (senior) researcher who has a doctorate) is eligible to be main supervisor of a PhD student. Universities have agreed that only such colleagues with proven capacity to supervise PhD projects will be granted this right. This means in practice that such colleagues have to have research-led profiles and considerable experience in co-supervising research students which in turn limits this right to associate or even senior associate professors. Increasingly, Ph.Ds are co-supervised by a UD or UHD, and they are often the regular point of contact for the Ph.D. student, particularly in large research groups.

=== International comparison ===
Although the ranks are often translated as if they were aligned with the American system (i.e. assistant, associate, and full professor), this not as clear-cut. Traditionally a lecturer could only become associate or full professor by applying for such a position if there was a vacancy. However, Dutch universities are moving towards a system closer to the US tenure track system to have more flexibility in rewarding merits of individuals. In Dutch universities, permanent positions must be offered upon the third extension of fixed-term position or after 6 years of continuous contracts (whichever comes first), a rule which was instigated to avoid permatemp situation; permanent positions may, of course, be offered sooner. Unlike in the US, the terms Assistant Professor and Associate Professor are not as such indicative of tenure status.

In 1986 there was a reform of the system. Junior professors and professors of the agricultural and technology universities, until then labelled as Lector were transformed into full Professors, but as a new Professor A rank at a lower salary scale than the existing professors (who were designated Professor B) on the older, and more favourable, salary scale. The present salary scales refer to Professor 1 or Professor 2 (the former is the higher in standing, as the Universities adopted the Hay criteria for function-ranking). The former title buitengewoon hoogleraar ("professor by special appointment", literally "extraordinary professor") for a part-time professor is no longer used (since the 1986 reforms); all the then holders of such positions became part-time full professors '(gewoon hoogleraren).

In the early 2000s the lector position (Readership in traditional UK terms) was introduced at universities of applied sciences for research group leaders dealing with applied research. Until that moment universities of applied sciences had no research tasks. Based on salary pay grade, lectors would rank between associate and full professor in the research university system.

== See also ==
- List of academic ranks
