= Westphal =

Westphal or Westphall may refer to the following people:

- Alexander Carl Otto Westphal (1863–1941), German physician, son of Carl Friedrich Otto and grandson of Otto Carl Friedrich Westphal
- Ari Westphal (born 1994), Brazilian fashion model
- Bernd Westphal (born 1960), German politician
- Brigitta Westphal (born 1944), German painter
- Carlo Westphal (born 1985), German professional road bicycle racer
- Christoph Westphal, pharmaceutical executive
- Daniel Westphal, Northern Mariana Islander footballer
- Dirk Westphal (born 1963), American artist
- Edwin Westphal (born 1966), Guatemalan former professional football forward
- Ernst Oswald Johannes Westphal (1919–1990), South African linguist
- Euler Renato Westphal, Brazilian Lutheran theologian
- Fletcher Westphal (born 2005), American football player
- Frank Westphal, (1889–1948), American musician
- George Augustus Westphal (1785–1875), English Royal Navy officer
- Gert Westphal (1920–2002), German-Swiss actor, recitator and director
- Heidi Westphal, German rower and Olympic medalist
- Heinz Westphal (1924–1998), German politician
- J. G. Westphal (1824–1859), German astronomer and mathematician
- James Westphal (1930–2004), American academic, scientist, engineer, inventor and astronomer
- James D. Westphal, American business professor
- Jeff Westphal (born 1986), American racing driver
- Joachim Westphal (of Eisleben) (died 1569), Lutheran theologian
- Joachim Westphal (of Hamburg) (c. 1510–1574), Lutheran theologian
- Johann Heinrich Westphal (1794–1831), German astronomer
- Jonathan Westphal (born 1951), British philosopher
- Joseph W. Westphal (born 1948), United States Under Secretary of the Army
- Karl Friedrich Otto Westphal (1833–1890), German neurologist and psychiatrist, son of Otto Carl Friedrich Westphal
- Katherine Westphal (born 1919), American textile designer
- Kenneth R. Westphal (born 1955), American philosopher
- Michael Westphal (1965–1991), tennis player for West Germany
- Otto Carl Friedrich Westphal (1800–1879), prominent physician and author on the human eye and on optics
- Paul Westphal (1950-2021), American basketball player and former head coach of the Sacramento Kings
- Rudolf Westphal (born 1826), German classical scholar
- Siegfried Westphal (1902–1982), German general
- Søren Westphal (born 1986), Danish handballer
- Wilhelm Westphal (1882–1978), German physicist
