= Otricoli =

- Comune
- Comune di Otricoli
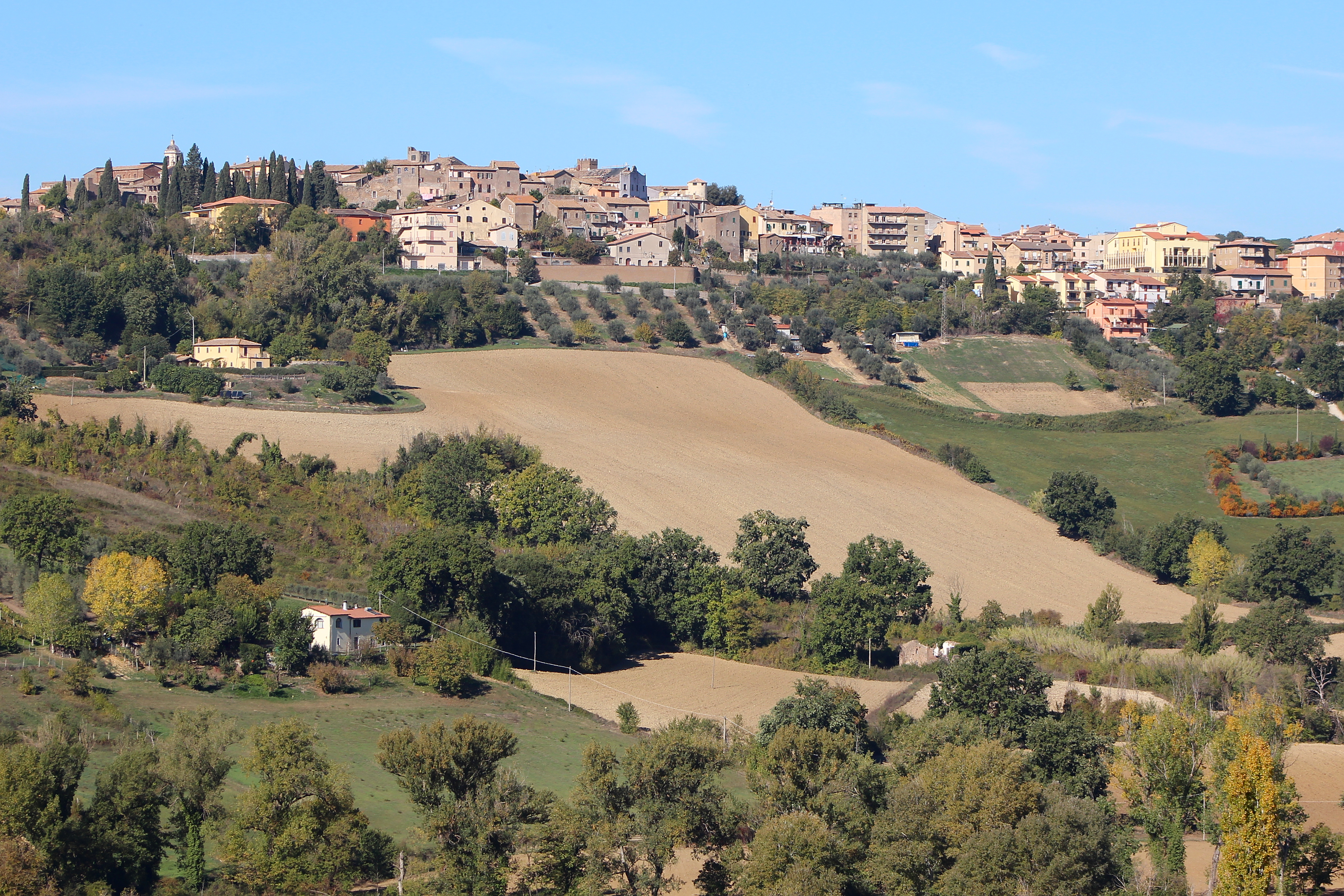
- View of Otricoli

- Location within Italy Location within Umbria
- Coordinates: 42.423233°N 12.478282°E
- Country: Italy
- Region: Umbria
- Province: Terni (TR)

Government
  - Mayor: Antonio Liberati

Area
  - Total: 27.27 km^{2} (10.53 sq mi)
- Elevation: 209 m (686 ft)

Population (1 January 2025)
  - Total: 1,697
  - Density: 62.23/km^{2} (161.2/sq mi)
- Demonym: Otricolani
- Time zone: UTC+1 (CET)
  - Summer (DST): UTC+2 (CEST)
- Postal code: 05030
- Dialing code: 0744
- Patron saint: San Vittore
- Saint day: May 14
- Website: Official website

Otricoli is a town and comune in the province of Terni, Umbria, central Italy. It is located on the Via Flaminia, near the east bank of the Tiber, some 70 km north of Rome and 20 km south of Narni.

It was originally the ancient Umbrian city of Ocriculum.

== Name ==
The name Otricoli derives from Ocre, later Latinized as Ocriculum and then Otricolum.

The name appears in several forms, including Ὄκρικλοι, Ὀκρίκολα, Ocriculum, and later Utriculum. The corruption of the original name appears to have begun at a very early period, since the form Utriculum is already found in the Itineraries and in certain manuscripts of classical authors. From this form the modern name Otricoli developed.

== History ==
=== Antiquity ===
Ocriculum was an important Umbrian city. Livy records that in 308 BC Ocriculum separated from the other cities of the Umbrian Confederation and concluded an alliance with Rome. This is the only information concerning the city prior to the Roman conquest of Umbria. The ancient city lay near the bank of the Tiber at the site where the church of San Vittore now stands.

After this period the town appears frequently in ancient history as a municipium of considerable importance. During the Roman period it developed from a small fortress into a colony with full rights. Otricoli was recorded as the starting point of the Via Flaminia and as an important stop at the gateway to Umbria. Cicero himself possessed a villa at Ocriculum.

In 210 BC, following the disastrous Battle of Lake Trasimene, Fabius Maximus took command at Ocriculum of the forces previously led by Servilius.

During the Social War the city was among those that were sacked and burned. It soon recovered and by the time of Strabo it had again become a flourishing municipium.

Tacitus records that the army of Vespasian halted at Ocriculum after the surrender at Narni of the legions of Vitellius. Because of its position along the Via Flaminia, the city is frequently mentioned incidentally during the Roman imperial period by authors including Pliny and Ammianus Marcellinus. Its name also appears in the Itineraries of Vicarello and Antoninus. Inscriptions refer to the municipium as the "splendidissima civitas Ocricolana" and indicate that it belonged to the Arnensis tribe.

In the 4th century Otricoli was an early Christian bishopric, and local tradition attributes its evangelization to the Apostles.

In 413 a battle took place here between Marius, a general of Honorius, and Heraclianus, the killer of Stilicho. At that time the city still retained considerable importance, since it had become the seat of a bishopric. Bishops recorded from Ocriculum include Ercole, who attended a Roman council held in 487; Costanzo, who held the episcopal see in 499; Fulgenzio, who lived around 540; and Domenico, who in 595 attended the council convened in Rome by Pope Gregory I.

The city was destroyed by Totila in 547, and its ruin was later completed by the Lombards.

=== Middle Ages to modern era ===
In the early medieval period Otricoli underwent repeated devastation, and settlement shifted from the Roman site to a hilltop town. This relocation is also linked to the desire to escape flooding by the Tiber and to avoid the unhealthy air of the marshes.

In the 8th century Otricoli was joined to the Duchy of Rome. In 1198 it submitted to Narni. In 1234 Pope Gregory IX placed it under the authority of the Church, with administration entrusted to the Rector of Sabina. On 25 January 1376 it became a self-governing town, receiving special statutes granted by Pope Gregory XI through a papal bull.

In 1708 Otricoli was transferred from Sabina to Umbria.

In 1775, excavations of the baths at the Roman city of Ocriculum brought to light a large quantity of archaeological material of considerable significance. The excavations conducted under Pope Pius VI produced numerous important finds. Westphal described these discoveries extensively in Romische Kampagne, and Giuseppe Antonio Guattani treated them in Monumenti Inediti (1784), including drawings and plans of the buildings brought to light.

In the period of the Roman Republic it formed part of the Department of Clitunno, within the Narni canton.

During the Napoleonic era, on Monte di Otricoli the Neapolitan troops suffered defeat at the hands of the French army commanded by General Mathieu.

In 1860 it became part of the Kingdom of Italy. In the 1890s, the population numbered 1,517 inhabitants.

== Geography ==
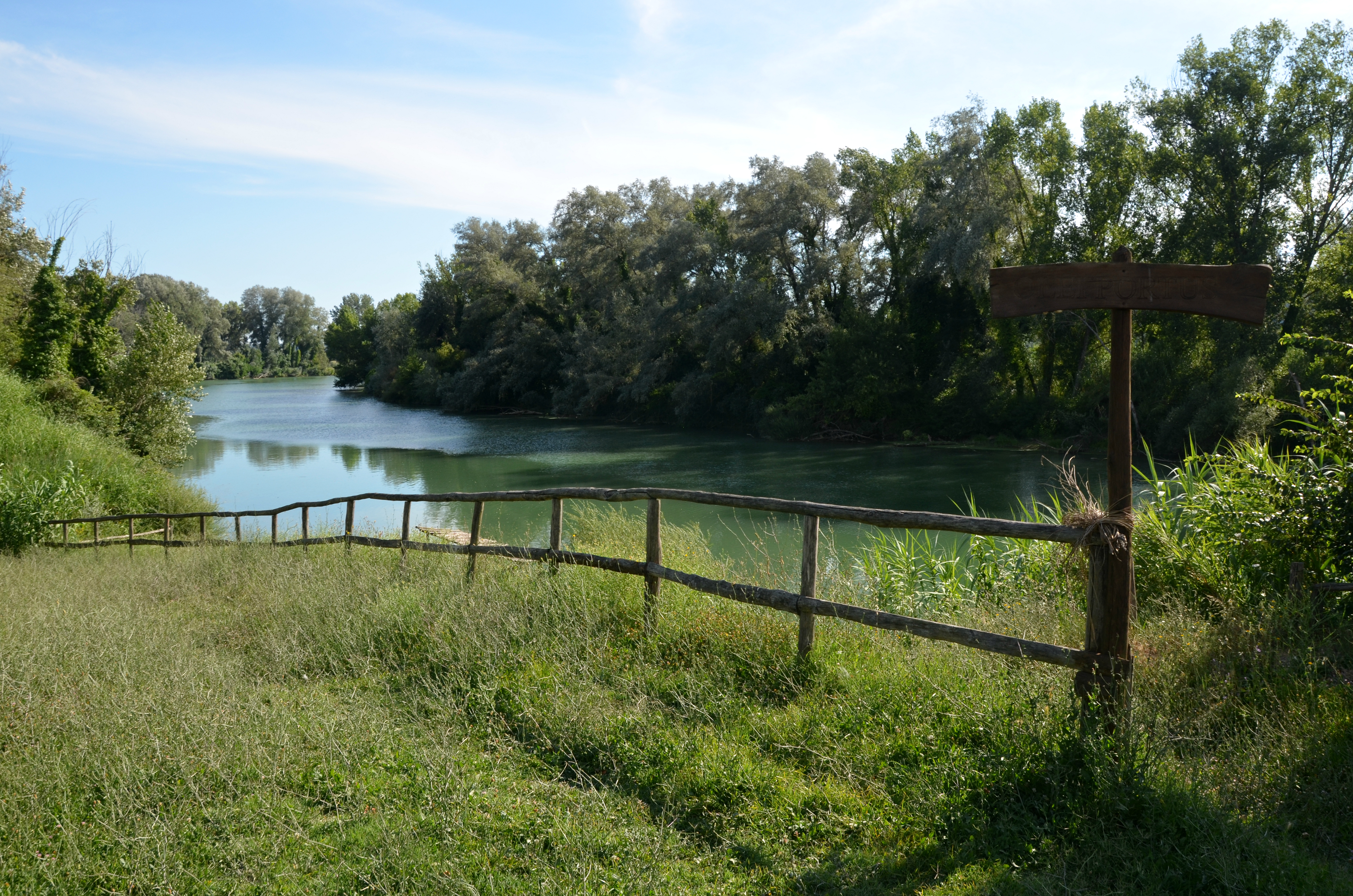
Riverbank landscape of the Tiber near the archaeological site of Ocriculum

Otricoli is located on the left bank of the Tiber, on a hill at an elevation of 208 metres (682 ft) above sea level and 160 metres (520 ft) above the valley.

The town is situated 6 miles (9.7 km) from Magliano, 12 miles (19 km) from Civita Castellana, and about 9 miles (14 km) and 33 miles (53 km) from Narni.

The vegetation is considered less prosperous and vigorous than is generally observed in Umbria. A few miles away began the Roman Campagna. The climate is described as temperate.

=== Subdivisions ===
The municipality includes the localities of Castellaccio, Castello delle Formiche, Otricoli, Poggio, Santo Janni.

In 2021, 284 people lived in rural dispersed dwellings not assigned to any named locality. At the time, the most populous localities were Otricoli proper (884), and Poggio (401). The following localities had no recorded permanent residents: Località Pianacci.

==== Poggio di Otricoli ====
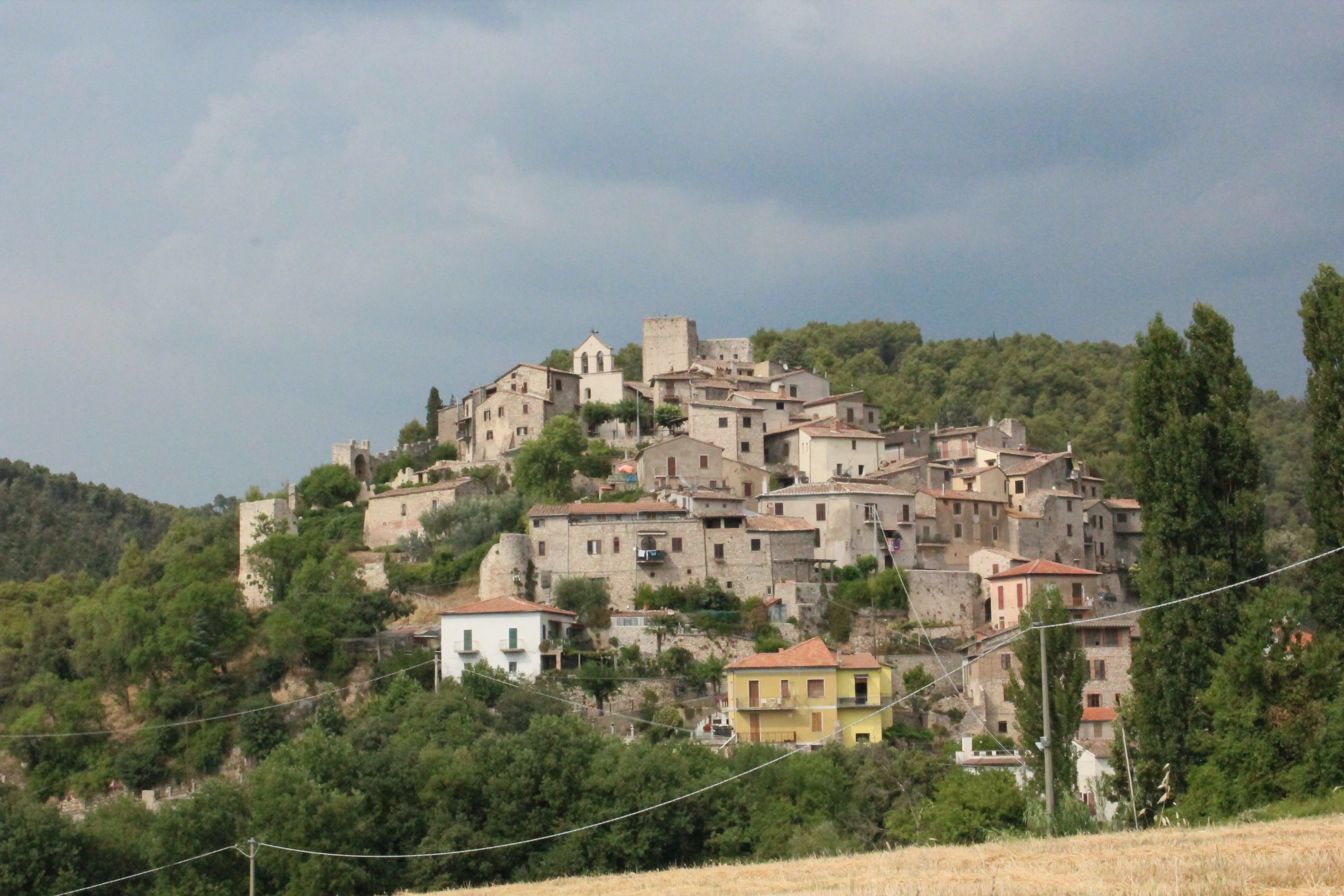
Poggio di Otricoli

Poggio di Otricoli is located on a hill at 387 metres (1,270 ft) above sea level below Monte San Pancrazio (1,027 metres (3,369 ft)). The settlement overlooks the Tiber valley and the region of Sabina. The place-name Poggio is common in central Italy, and the settlement was historically known as Poggio di Narni or Poggio di Mezzo to distinguish it from other places with the same name.

The village represents a fortified settlement with a compact layout. Two main streets structure the settlement: Via Maestra, which descends from the fortress to the square of San Nicola, and Via della Rocca, where the structure known as the Loggia degli Innamorati is located.

== Economy ==
In the 19th century, the territory of Otricoli produced wine, fruit, and cereals, along with smaller amounts of olive oil. Travertine of mixed varieties was also found there.

== Religion ==
=== Santa Maria Assunta ===
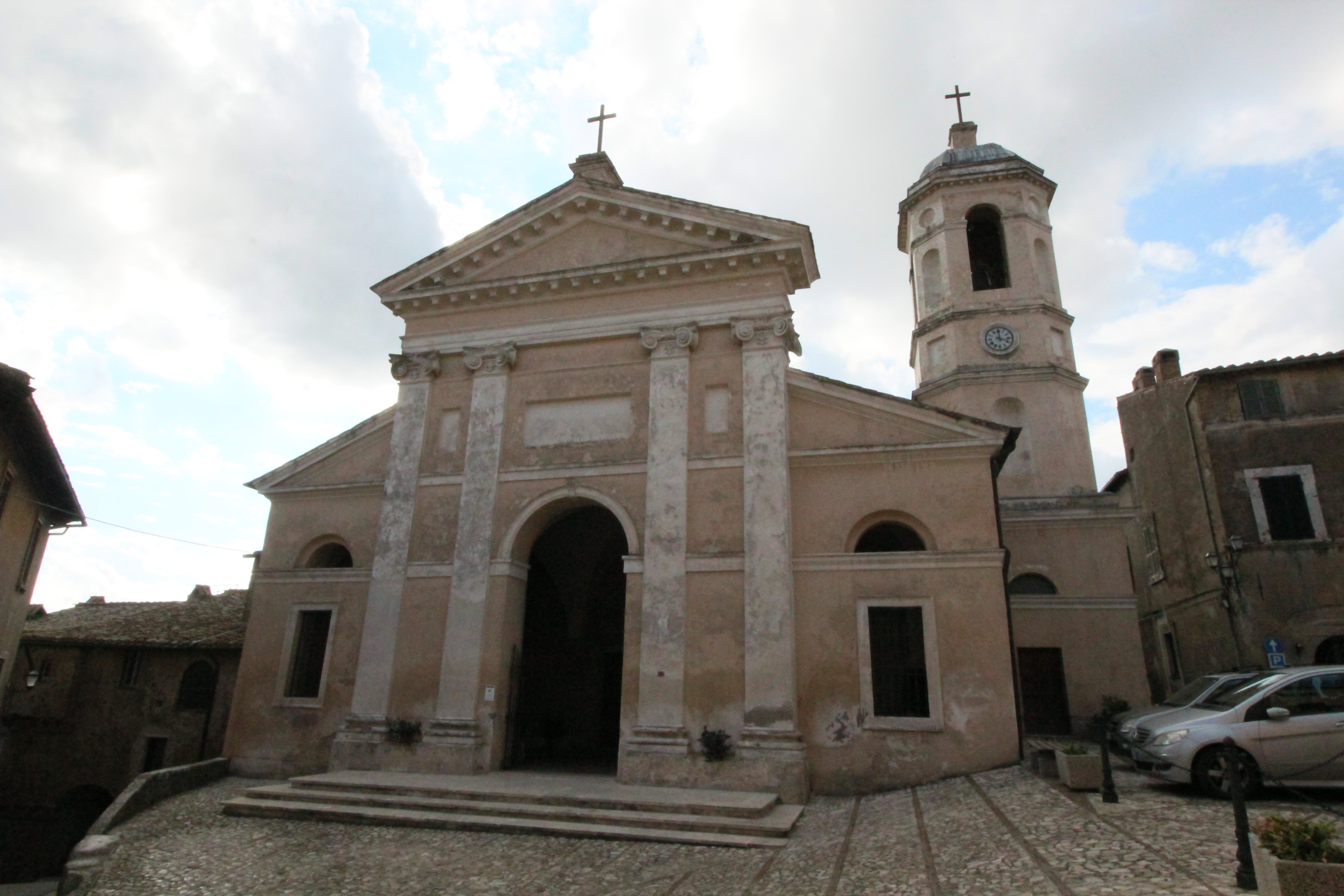
Church of Santa Maria Assunta

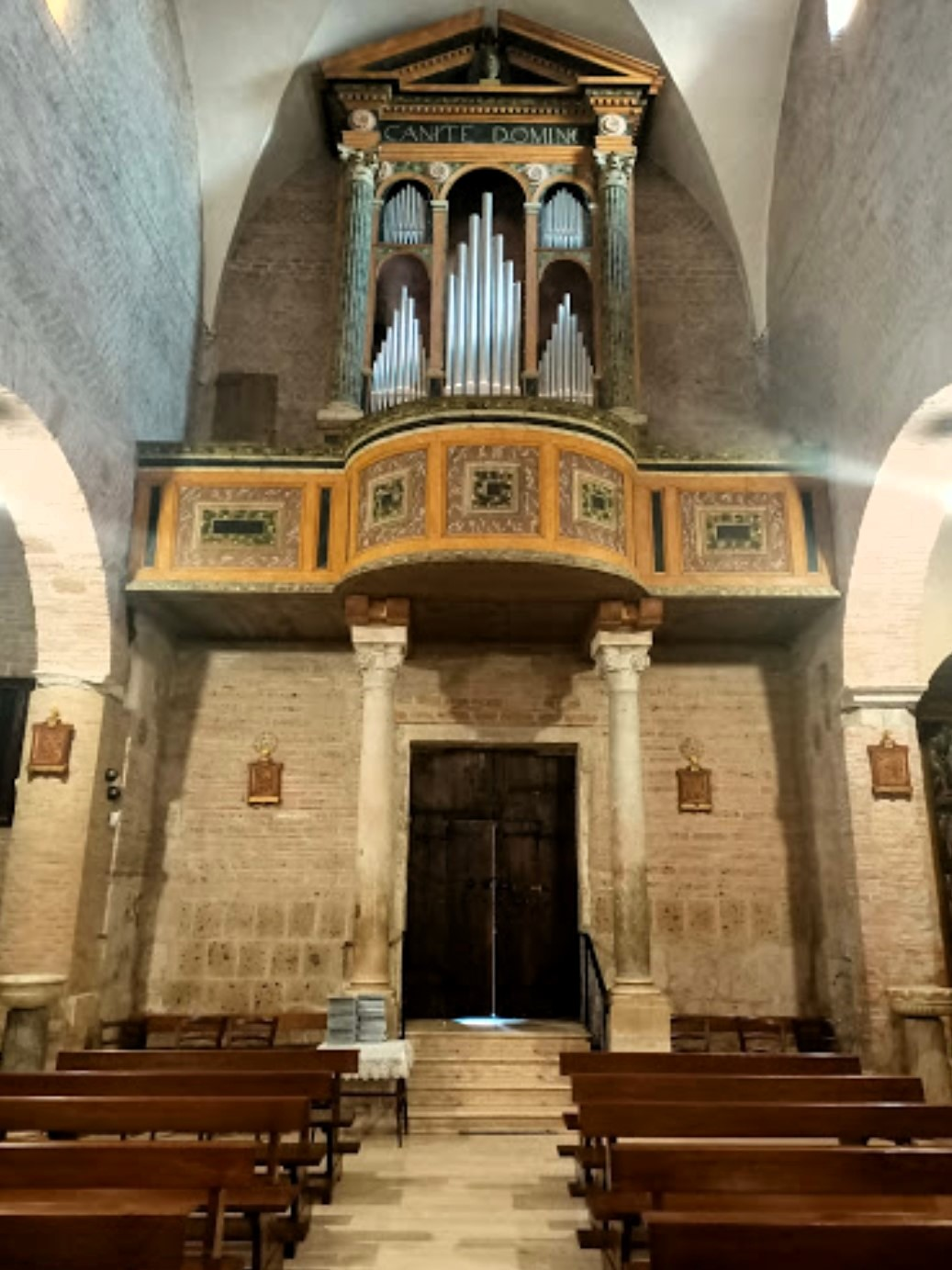
Cantoria and pipe organ above the main doorway

The parish church of Otricoli, dedicated to Santa Maria Assunta, stands at the highest point of the town on the main square. Long considered a 12th-century building, it was later identified as an example of pre-Romanesque architecture of the 7th century following the discovery in 1957 of a niche containing 15th-century frescoes. Excavations conducted in 2004 revealed, beneath the left side of the church, a stretch of walls in opus quadratum belonging to an earlier place of worship. Evidence of the early phases of the building also appears in the technique of Roman opus mixtum visible on both the exterior and interior walls.

The structure underwent alterations and today has a rectangular plan divided into three naves. The central nave is entered through a doorway above which stand the choir gallery and a Renaissance organ. Within it is the Crypt of Saint Medico, an ancient underground space formerly used as a monastic retreat and containing a Baroque altar. The presbytery area lies beyond. At the center of the apse wall is a stained-glass window by the Otricoli painter Roberto Maurini, beneath which stands a 15th-century wooden choir with inlay decoration arranged in a horseshoe shape. The high altar, of Umbrian school and dated to the 12th–13th centuries, includes a 16th-century marble ciborium whose columns reuse Roman material.

Two smaller aisles run along either side of the central nave. These contain four Baroque chapels and a smaller chapel in the left aisle. The right aisle includes two restored Baroque chapels dedicated to Saint Fulgentius and Saint Dominic and also contains a baptistery. Among the furnishings are a wooden cabinet with embossed emblems in imitation gilded marble dated 1717 in the chapel of Saint Fulgentius and a fresco depicting Bishop Saint Fulgentius distributing bread to the poor of Otricoli in the chapel of Saint Dominic. Opposite the right aisle stands a 16th-century marble baptismal font, and nearby a Gothic marble Eucharistic tabernacle with a wooden door.

The left aisle contains two Baroque chapels, a small chapel dedicated to Saint Anthony the Abbot, and the chapel of the Madonna Addolorata, formerly dedicated to Saint Lucy and later to the Santissimo Crocifisso. Frescoes from the first half of the 16th century and a polychrome stucco dove representing the Holy Spirit have been uncovered there. The chapel of the Santissimo Sacramento, of Gothic origin, has a dome with lantern frescoed with the Vision of Saint John at Patmos and the Angel of Fire. Another chapel decorated in the 17th century contains a reliquary altar and sixteen frescoes framed in stucco and gold leaf depicting the mysteries of the Holy Rosary and episodes from the life of the Virgin.

=== San Nicola ===
The Church of San Nicola dates to the late 15th or early 16th century. It consists of a rectangular hall covered by a cross vault with a large chapel on the left, which may represent the nucleus of the earliest structure. The façade includes a round-arched portal decorated with a radiant frame containing the letters IHS and a small bas-relief depicting Saint Nicholas in episcopal vestments. Above the portal is a small trilobed window. A bell gable with two pointed arches and two bronze bells rises above the roof.

Inside are 17th-century paintings, a 16th-century stone baptismal font, a stone basin for holy water of the same period, and frescoes uncovered during restoration works.

=== Other religious buildings ===
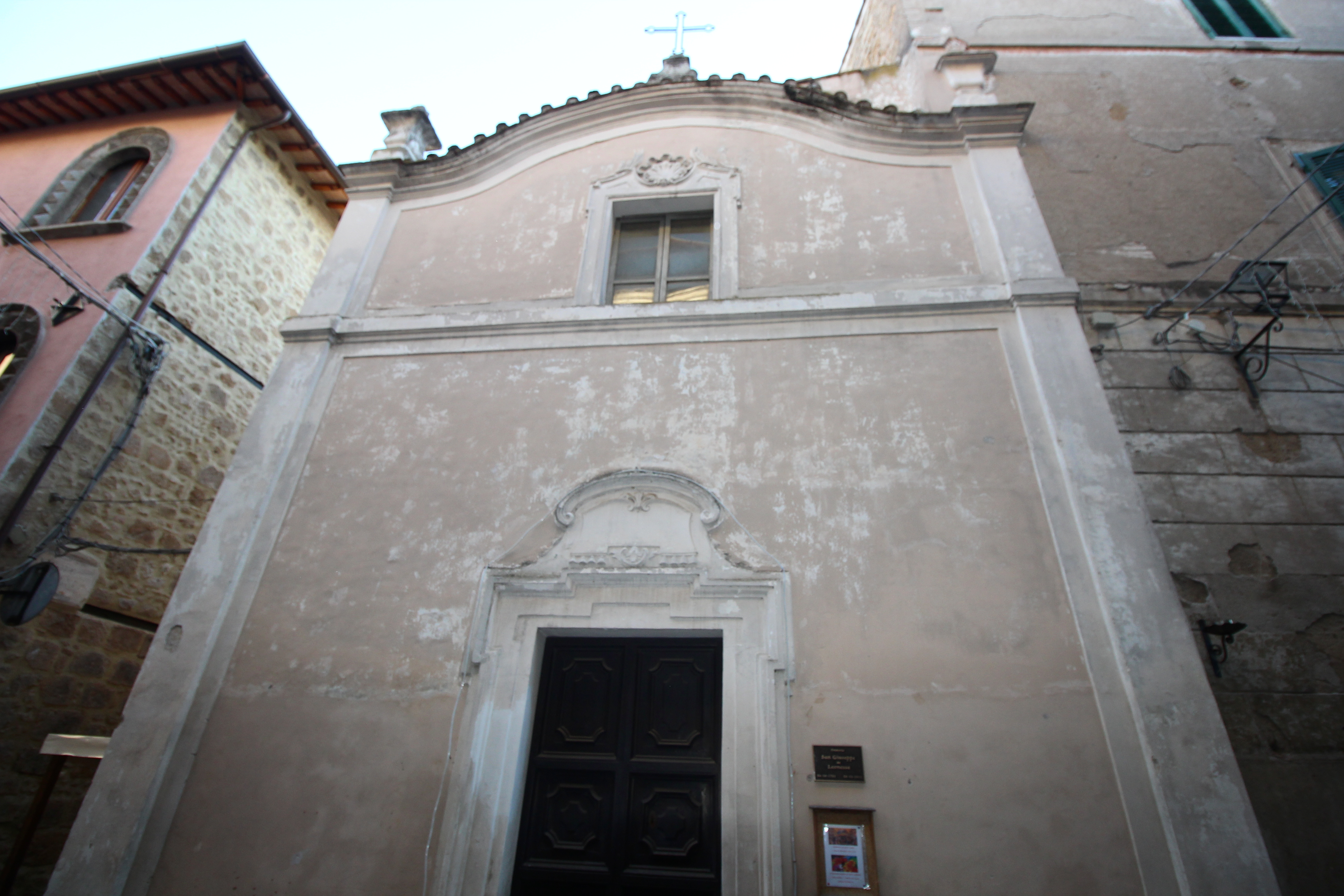
Oratory of San Giuseppe da Leonessa

The Oratory of San Giuseppe da Leonessa was built in 1761. The façade ends in a curved profile and is surmounted by an iron cross set on a shaped base, with decorative vase-shaped elements on either side. The interior is decorated with white stucco. The vault contains a painting depicting the saint in glory. On the altar, within a niche, stands a wooden statue of the saint, while 18th-century paintings on the walls depict episodes from his life and miracles.

The Church of San Salvatore is recorded as Cappella S. Salvatoris in a notarial act of 1235. The building has a rectangular plan and a bell gable above the façade. Restoration works revealed a 14th-century fresco of Umbrian school. Ex-voto frescoes are present on the side walls, including three images depicting the Madonna del Latte.

== Culture ==
=== Municipal Antiquarium ===
The Municipal Antiquarium is located in the Palazzo Priorale of Otricoli and presents the historical development of the area through three phases: the pre-Roman settlement, the Roman city of Ocriculum, and the medieval historic center where ancient materials were reused in the urban fabric.

The museum displays archaeological finds from the Roman city of Ocriculum, including a reproduction of the polychrome mosaic from the baths, a collection of surface finds, an altar table, four decorated funerary inscriptions, and a table support. It also preserves the only original cast of the colossal Zeus of Otricoli discovered in the late 18th century. The marble head belonged to a colossal statue constructed with marble for the exposed parts and masonry and stucco for the rest of the body, a technique known as an acrolith. The figure likely represented Jupiter of the local Capitolium, dedicated to the triad of Jupiter, Juno and Minerva, and was modeled on the statue of Jupiter in the Capitoline Temple of Rome. That statue in turn followed the model of the Zeus of Olympia, attributed to the sculptor Phidias, created in the 5th century BC.

=== Archaeology ===
==== Ocriculum ====
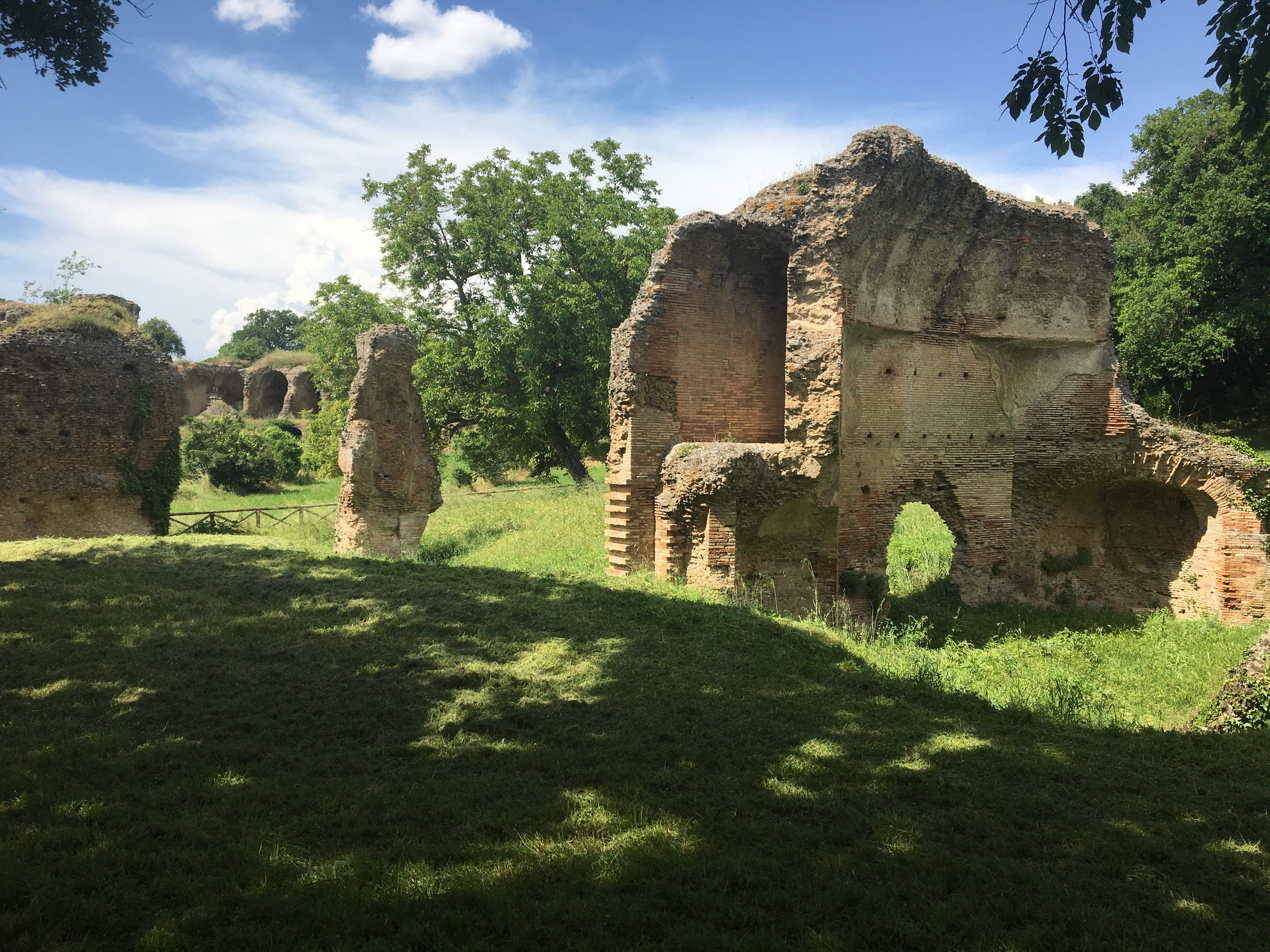
Remains of the Ocriculum Baths

The remains of the Roman city of Ocriculum lie in a landscape along a bend of the Tiber and are crossed by the Via Flaminia. Walking routes allow access to the principal monuments of the ancient settlement, including the forum and basilica area, the structure known as the Grandi Sostruzioni, the theatre, the baths, a monumental entrance pier, a large nymphaeum, a paved stretch of the ancient Via Flaminia flanked by a circular funerary monument and a public fountain, the amphitheatre, and several funerary monuments.

Excavations carried out in 1780 at the site of the ancient municipium revealed several public buildings, including the theatre, the basilica, the amphitheater, the baths, and several temples. These remains were then for the most part covered again.

Among the most famous objects recovered are monuments now displayed in the round hall of the Vatican Museums, including the large mosaic that decorated the floor of the principal hall of the baths, depicting Nereids, Tritons, sea monsters, and scenes of combat between Greeks and Centaurs. Also discovered were the colossal head of Zeus of Otricoli, and the colossal head of Claudius.

Approaching the city along the road leading to it, several remains of masonry appear that are believed to have been part of the enclosure used to hold wild beasts. Nearby stands the amphitheater, whose arena measures 67 meters by 45 meters along the major axes of its ellipse. An additional 17 meters were occupied by the seating tiers, the podium, and the external portico.

Within the area of the ancient city the principal cloaca was discovered. To the north-east were found water reservoirs and other structures. In the property known as Le Civitelle remains of roads and subterranean chambers were uncovered.

Among the remains are the ruins of the villa of Titus Annius Milo, as well as structures associated with the Manlia gens. Excavations also uncovered a large porphyry basin.

==== Other sites ====
Part of the site includes the Antiquarium of Casale San Fulgenzio, which houses a permanent archaeological exhibition with materials uncovered during excavations conducted between 1960 and 2005. Among the finds are pre-Roman bucchero vessels, decorative terracottas, bricks, cinerary urns, and marble portraits and sculptures.

Along the modern Strada Statale Flaminia lies an archaic necropolis dating to the 7th century BC.

== Notable people ==
Among the most distinguished families of Otricoli in the 19th century were that of Count Ernesto Squarti for wealth, the Pierdonati and Gigli families for literary distinction, and the Biondi family for evangelical charity and learning, exemplified by the archpriest Domenico Biondi.
