= Westphal (disambiguation) =

Westphal is a surname.

Westphal may also refer to:

- 20D/Westphal, a periodic comet
- Westphal, Nova Scotia
- Westphal balance, scientific instrument for measuring the density of liquids
- Westphal's sign, the clinical correlate of the absence or decrease of patellar reflex or knee jerk

== See also ==
- Westfall (disambiguation)
