= Joachim Westphal =

Joachim Westphal may refer to:

- Joachim Westphal (of Hamburg) (ca. 1510–1574), German theologian
- Joachim Westphal (of Eisleben) (d. 1569), German theologian
