= 20D =

20D

- Canon EOS 20D, camera.
- 20D/Westphal, comet.
