= Westfall (disambiguation) =

Westfall is a surname.

Westfall may also refer to:

== Other uses ==
- Westfall, Kansas, an unincorporated community
- Westfall, Ohio, an unincorporated community
- Westfall, Oregon, an unincorporated community
- Westfall High School, a school in Williamsport, Ohio
- Westfall Township in Pike County, Pennsylvania
- Westfall Winery, a winery in New Jersey
- "Westfall", a song by Okkervil River on the album, Don't Fall in Love with Everyone You See

== See also ==
- Westphal (disambiguation)
