= Ocriculum =

Ocriculum is an archaeological area covering about 36 hectares. Excavations of the Roman site beginning in 1775 led to the discovery of the baths, a theatre, a basilica, and other buildings.

The massive bath complex included a large octagonal room where a spectacular mosaic pavement was found, now preserved in the Vatican Museums in the Sala della Rotonda of the Museo Pio-Clementino. Other important finds from the site include the head of Zeus of Otricoli and the head of Claudius, also displayed in the same gallery.

Major structures at the site include a theatre built into the natural slope of the land, a large complex known as the “Great Substructures,” a monumental nymphaeum, and the forum discovered north of the river San Vittore. Several monumental tombs stand within the city near the Via Flaminia, where the ancient road remains well preserved and paved with large basalt stones.

== History ==
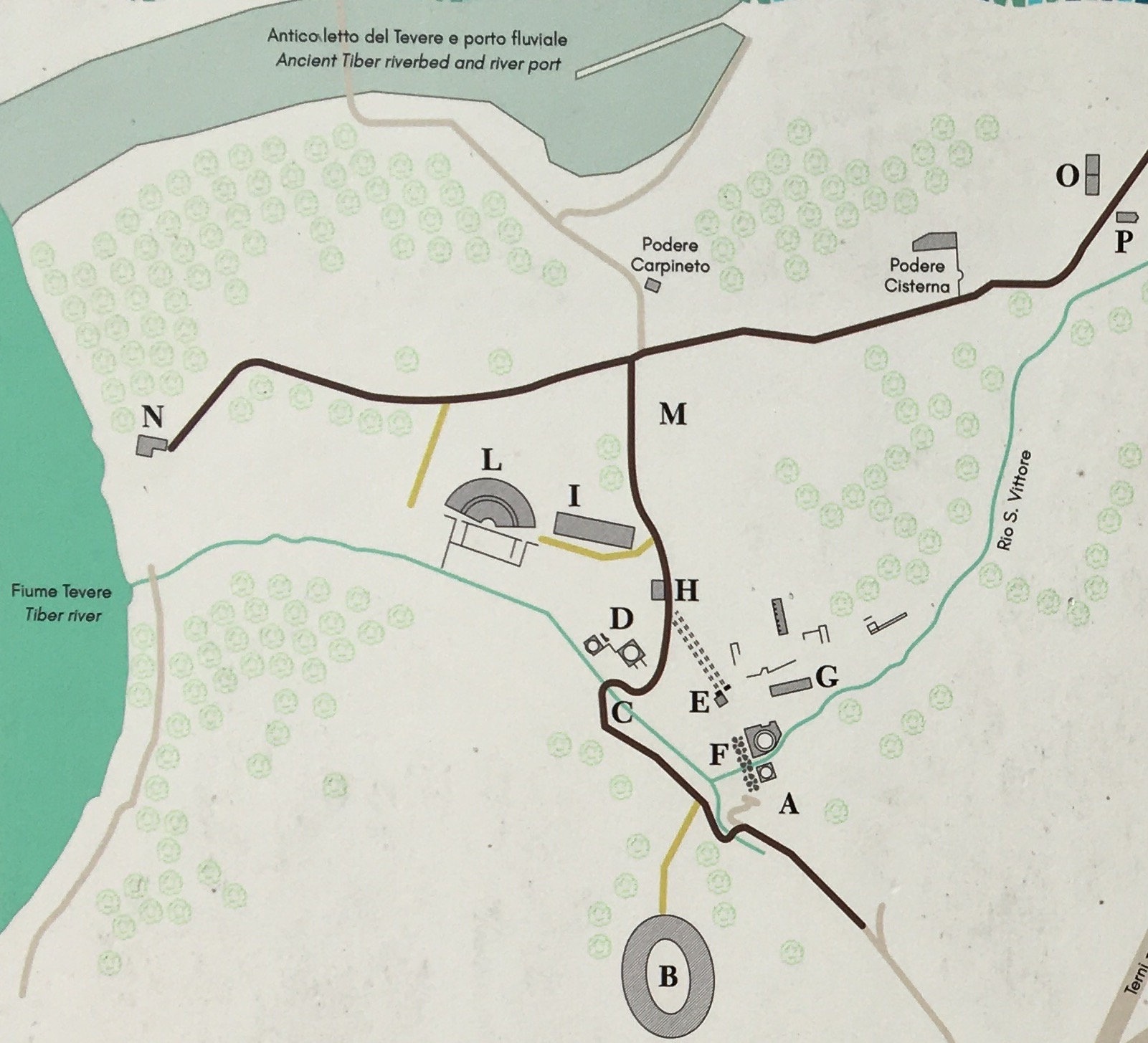
Ocriculum map. L – theatre, B – amphitheatre, D – baths, I – great substructures, G – nymphaeum, H – small substructures

The Umbrian city was probably located on the hill under the modern town. After the defeat of the Umbrian tribes at the battle of Mevania in the Samnite Wars, the inhabitants of Ocriculum concluded an alliance with Rome in 308 BC. From this date that the city began to perform a strategic function as a border town between Umbria, the Ager Faliscus and the Sabina and especially following the construction in 220 BC of the Via Flaminia.

A new unwalled city was built about 2 km south of and below the present town probably around this time in order to be closer to the curve of the Tiber and the Via Flaminia, which crossed the river here to enter Umbria. Its river port was the "oil port", signalling the olive culture that supported its economy. A pensor lignarius ("weigher of wood") in an inscription identifies a trade in timber and perhaps firewood.

It became a municipium, governed by quattuorvirs, and was ascribed to the Arnensis tribe, as documented by several epigraphs found on site.

The beauties of its surroundings made it a desirable place for patricians to holiday: Titus Annius Milo, a friend of Cicero and a leading politician in the mid-1st century BC, had a villa there. He was accused of killing Clodius (in 52 BC) after transporting weapons across the Tiber to his villa in Ocriculum; Pompea Celerina, the very wealthy mother-in-law of Pliny the Younger, also had estates there at the end of the 1st century AD.

In the imperial age it flourished as shown by its great monuments and exceptional works of art, due to an economy based on agriculture, commerce and the pottery industry: famous are the well-known cups in relief called "Popilius Cups" and the tile and brick factories whose stamps are known, found in Rome in the Tiber.

In the Diocletian reform of the regions of Italy, Ocricolum became part of Tuscia et Umbria. In the 4th century, Emperor Constantius II stopped here on his way to Rome. According to the historian Hydatius who lived in the 5th century, the most important event that took place in its territory would be the bloody battle (50,000 dead) which took place in Otriculum in winter 412-3 between Heraclianus, the usurper and comes of Africa (who came from Carthage on 3700 ships), and the army of emperor Honorius led by the comes Marino who was victorious.

The names of four bishops are known, an Erculio who participated in the Roman council of 487, a Costanzo who participated in the Roman council of 499, a Fulgentius mentioned by Pope Gregory I and of whom a corbel from the altar he erected to San Vittore, and a Dominic who took part in the councils of 595 and 601.

The city was destroyed between 569 and 605 during the Lombard invasion after which the lower city was abandoned in favour of the one on the hill.

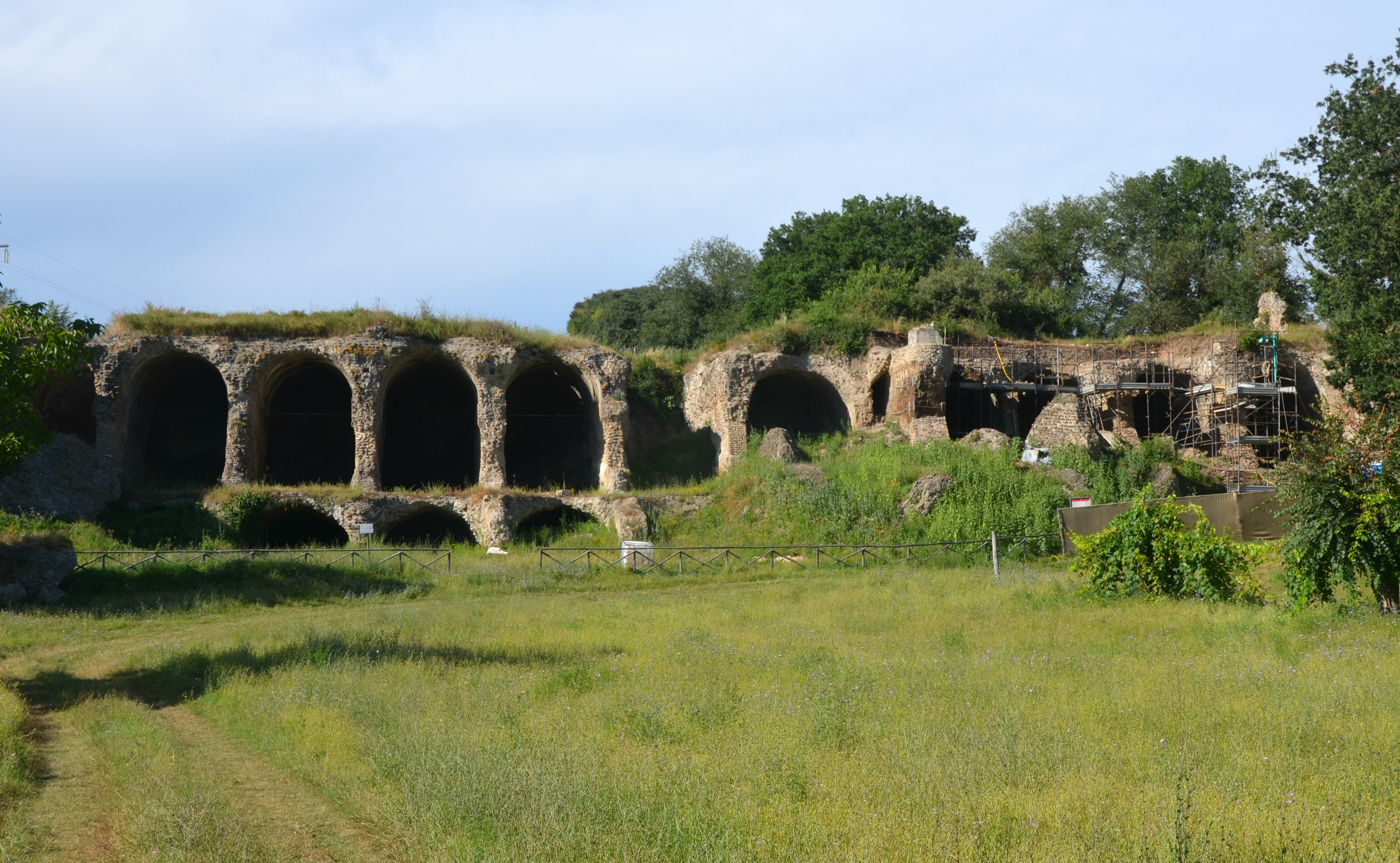
The substructures

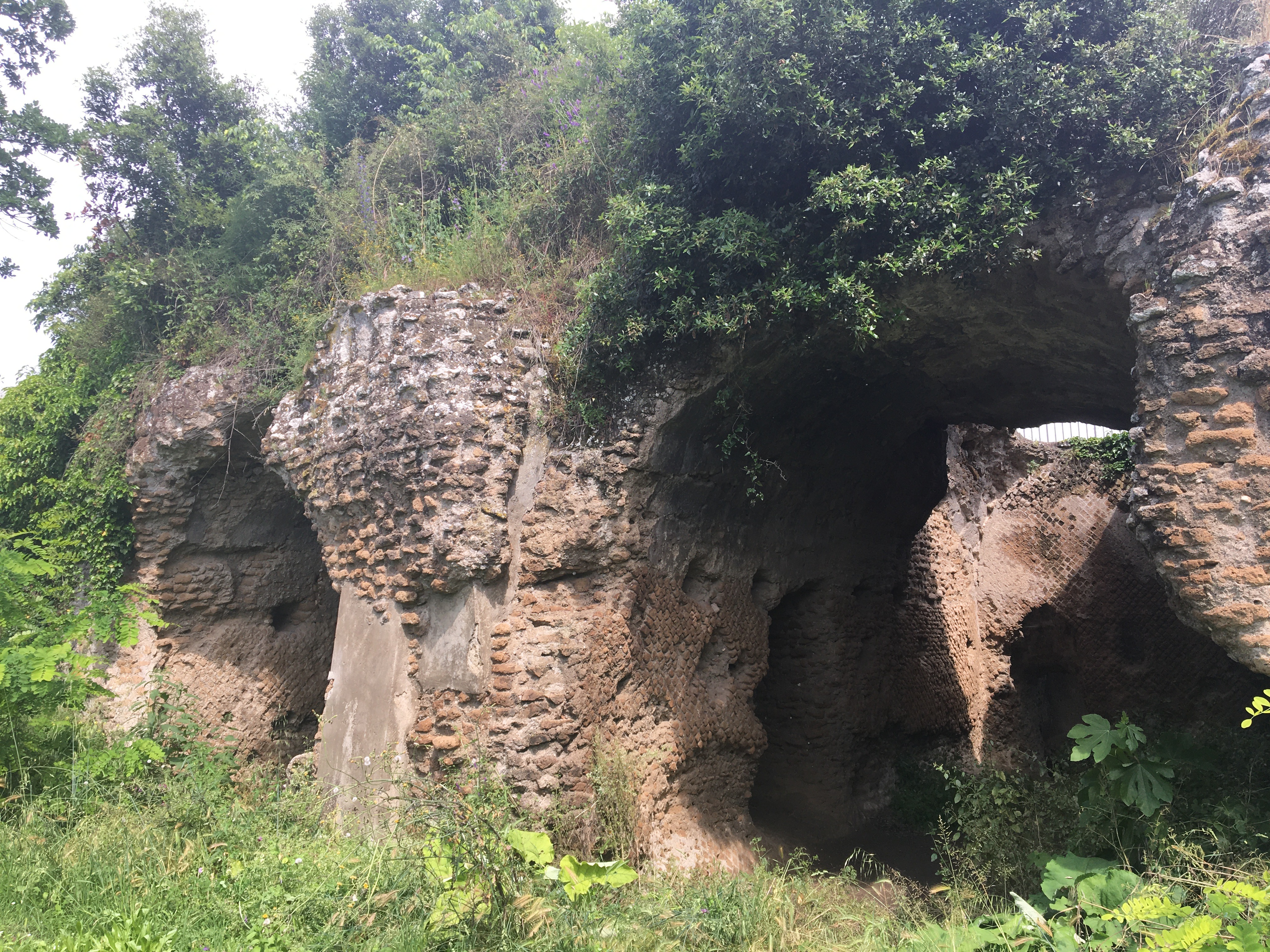
Theatre of Ocriculum

== The site ==
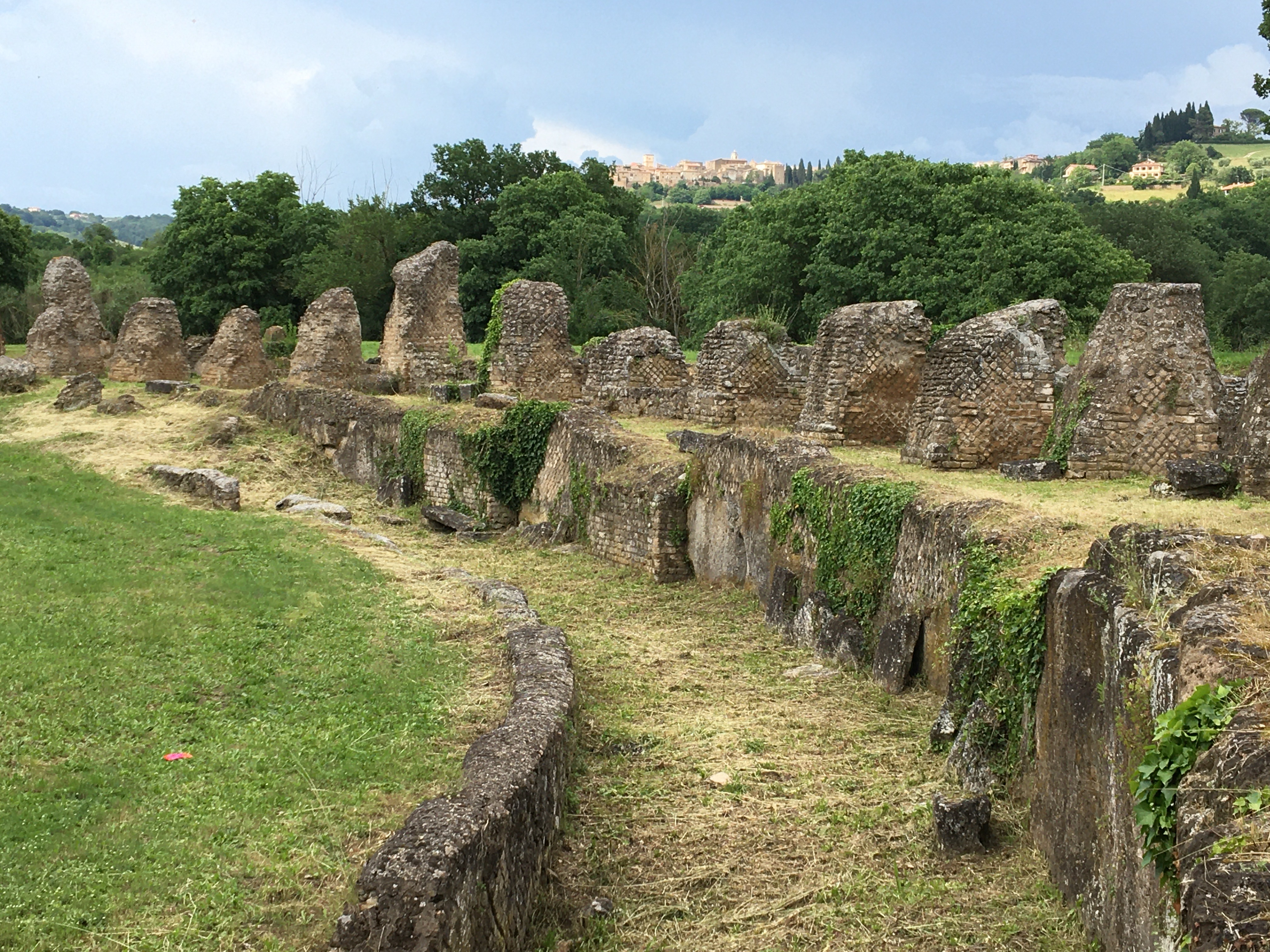
amphitheatre of Ocriculum

The archaeological area covers about 36 hectares. Excavations on the Roman site in 1775 and following years led to the discovery of the baths, a theatre, a basilica and other buildings.

The massive baths buildings include a great "octagonal room’" in which the spectacular mosaic pavement was found, now in the Sala della Rotonda, Museo Pio-Clementino. Of the many other superb works of art found (many in the Vatican museum) are the celebrated head of Zeus of Otricoli and the head of Claudius both also shown in the Sala della Rotonda. Winter baths to the north also existed as evidenced by inscriptions, referring to their restoration in the 4th century, and statue bases.

The theatre is built using the natural slope of the land for its cavea, only the ends having three built-up vaulted structures on both the right and left. Behind the rows of seats are two partially visible ambulatories. Of the upper gallery only a sector covered with a barrel vault remains; the external perimeter is formed by a retaining wall reinforced by pillars. In front of the cavea was the scaenae frons adorned with precious coloured marbles and with statues and decorations including the gigantic Muses now preserved in the Vatican museums.

In the city centre next to the theatre is a massive and unique building known as the "Great Substructures" consisting of twelve vaulted rooms on two levels which supported a terrace high above most of the town. It dates from late 1st c. BC to early 1st c. AD. It could have provided a monumental area supporting a temenos (enclosed sacred area) for a temple, similar to sanctuaries of the same period such as at Tibur. The rooms of the upper level have opus reticulatum walls still covered with plaster in some places. It was also perhaps used as a warehouse, given the nearby river port known as "dell'Olio". A smaller version of the substructures nearby expanded the central city area with a terrace.

The monumental nymphaeum, 50 m long, is part of a series of buildings that formed a monumental facade on the slope of the valley. It dates from late 1st c. BC and early 1st c. AD and is faced in opus reticulatum and has three fountains in alternating semicircular and rectangular niches. It is connected to the cistern inside the antiquarium Casale San Fulgenz through a system of tunnels and also fed by the river San Vittore.

The forum discovered in the excavations of 1778-81 was north of the river San Vittore and included the so-called "basilica" containing many imperial statues, indicating a public building for the imperial cult, or Augusteum.

Several monumental tombs unusually stand within the city in the valley near the via Flaminia, one of which is of a large drum form next to a public well and seats and belonged to Lucius Cominus Tuscus, son of Caius, of the Arnensis tribe.

The Via Flaminia is well preserved and paved with large basalt stones in front of the tombs.

== Gallery ==
Mosaic from the baths now in the Vatican museums.

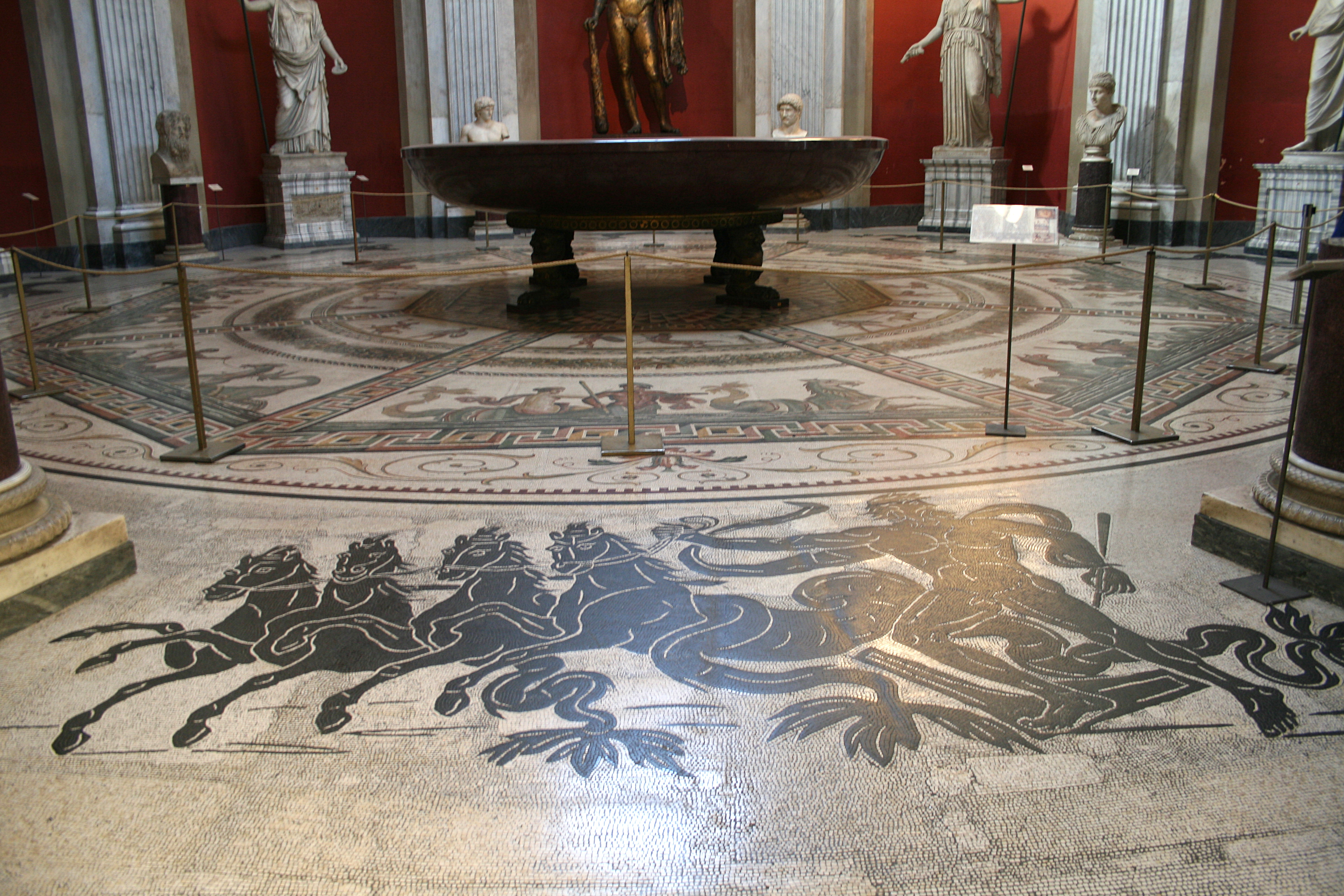

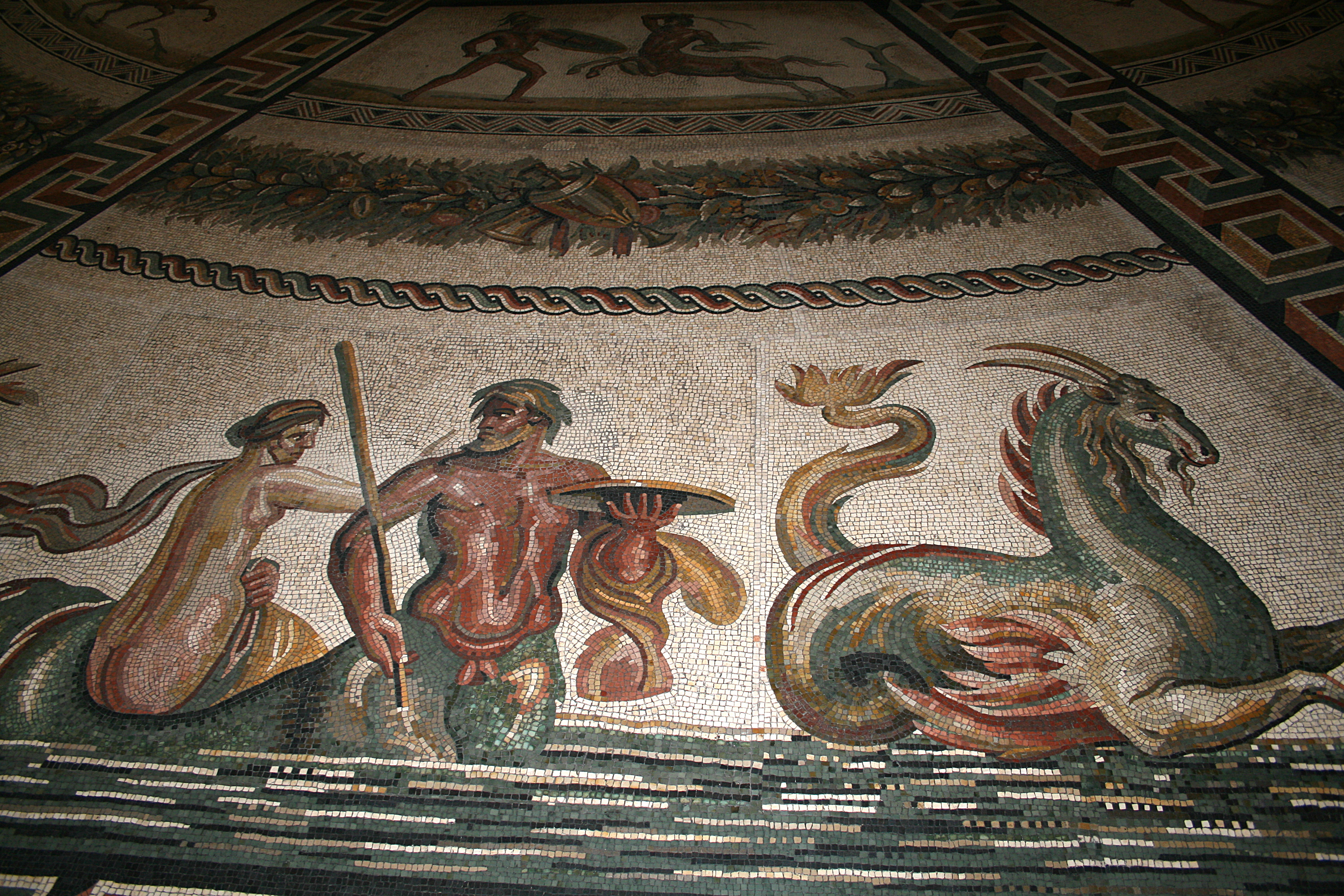

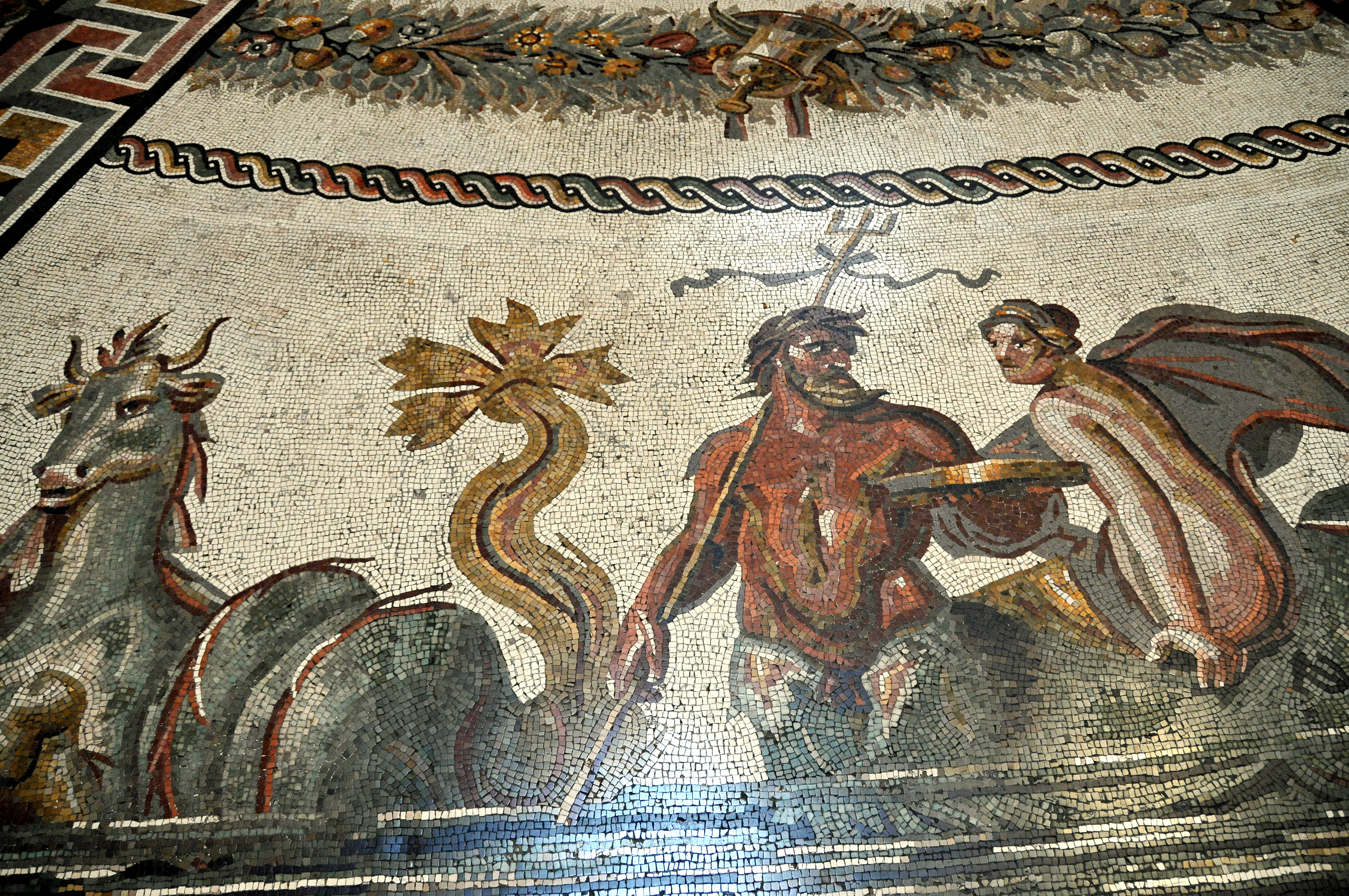

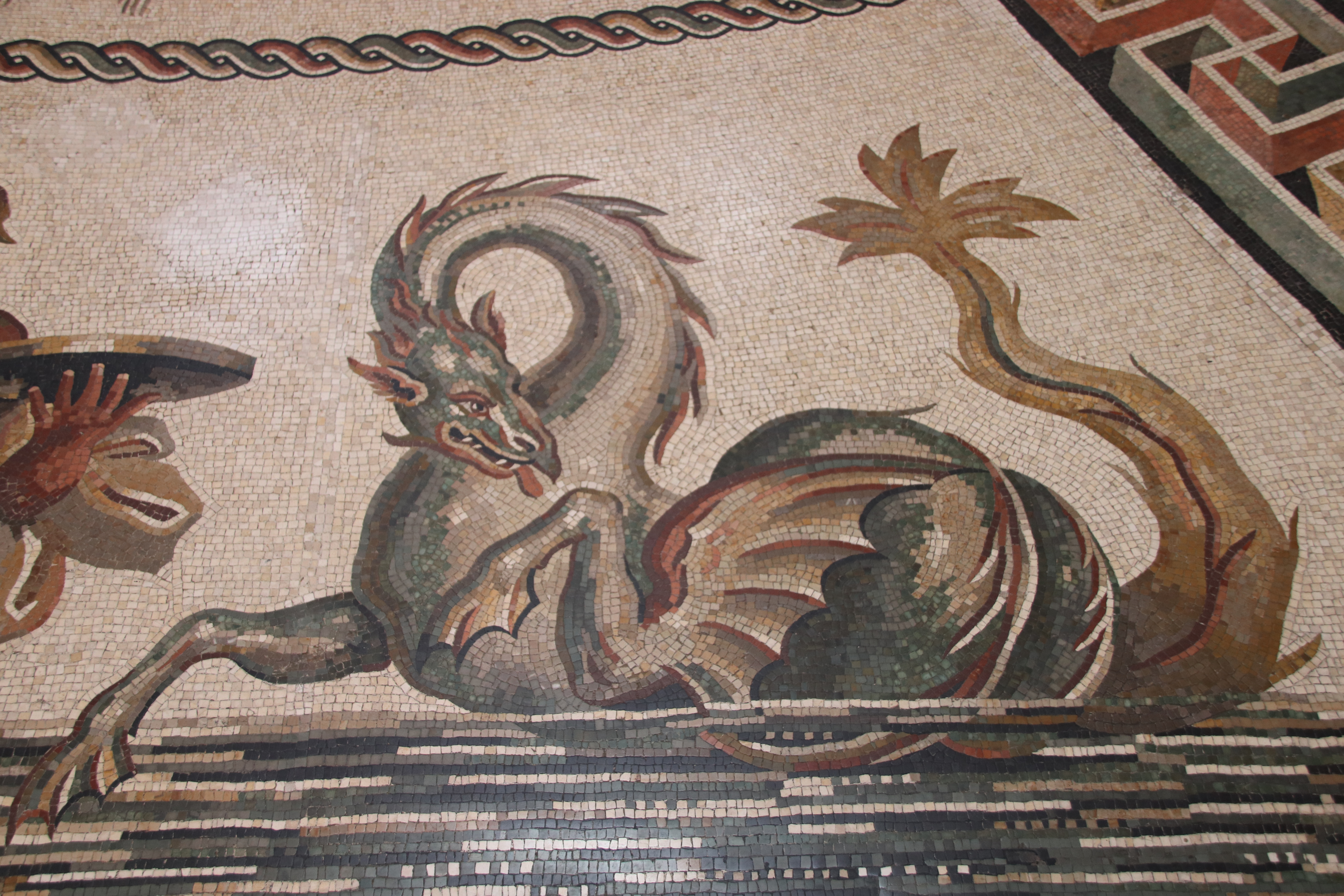

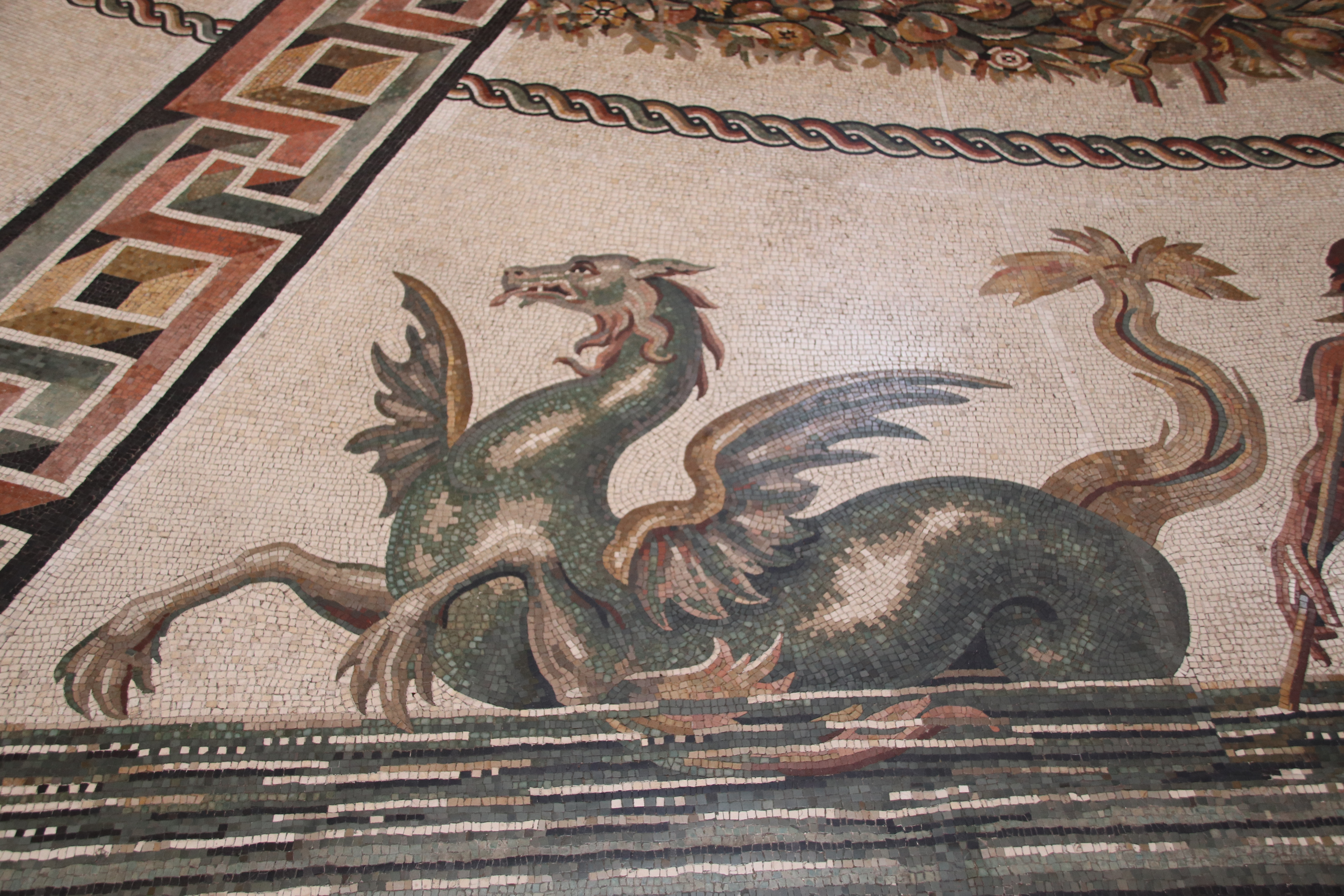

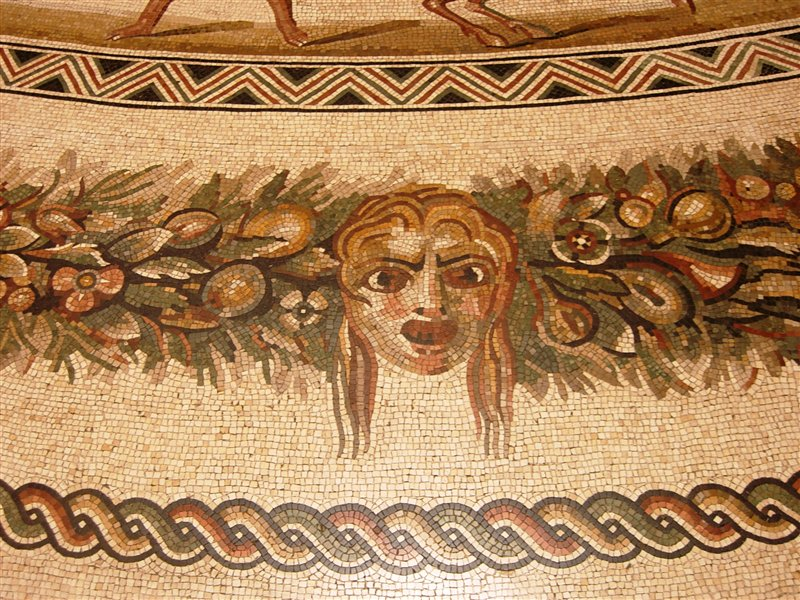

Sculpture from Ocriculum in the Vatican Museums:

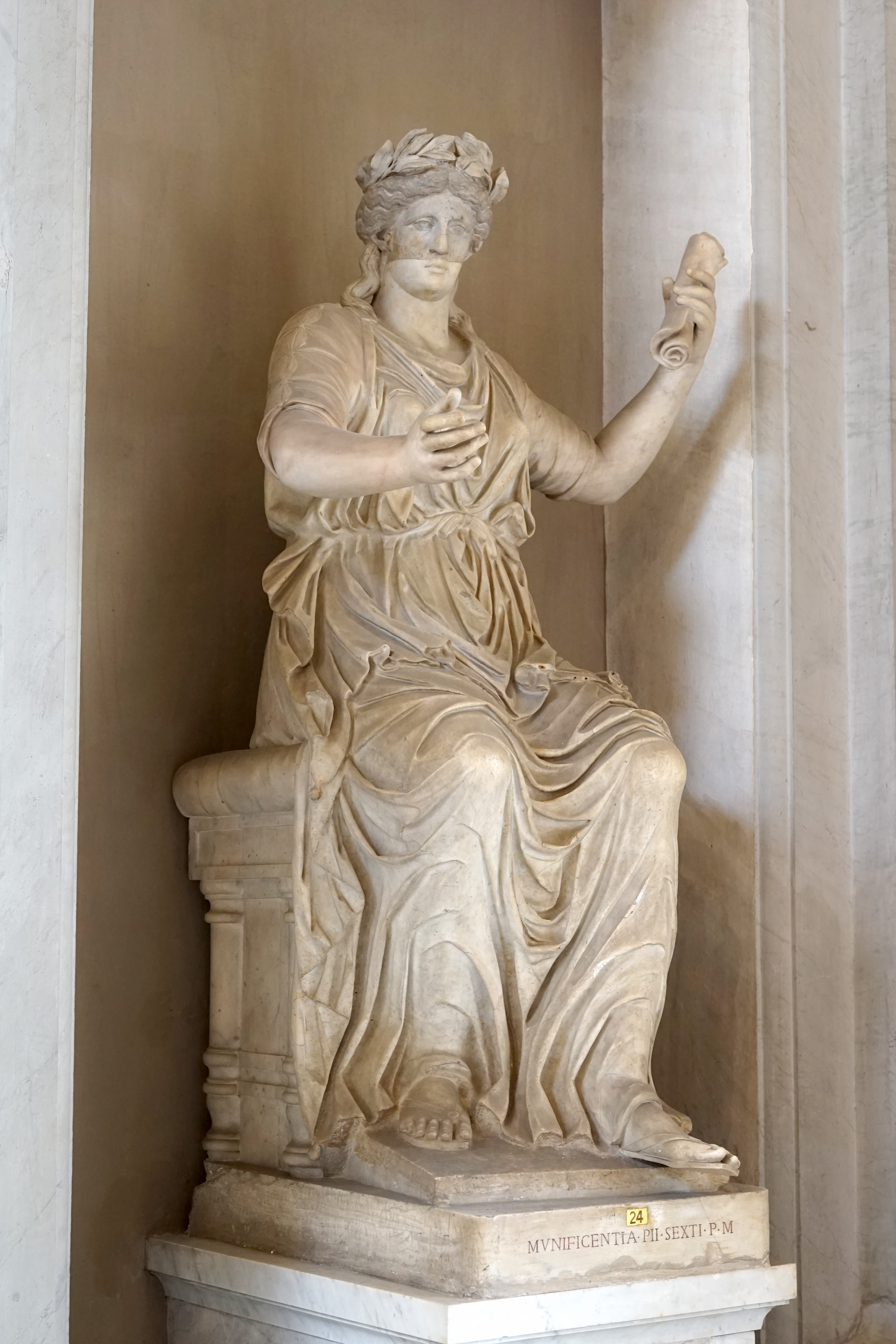
Muse Clio, II c. AD from the theatre

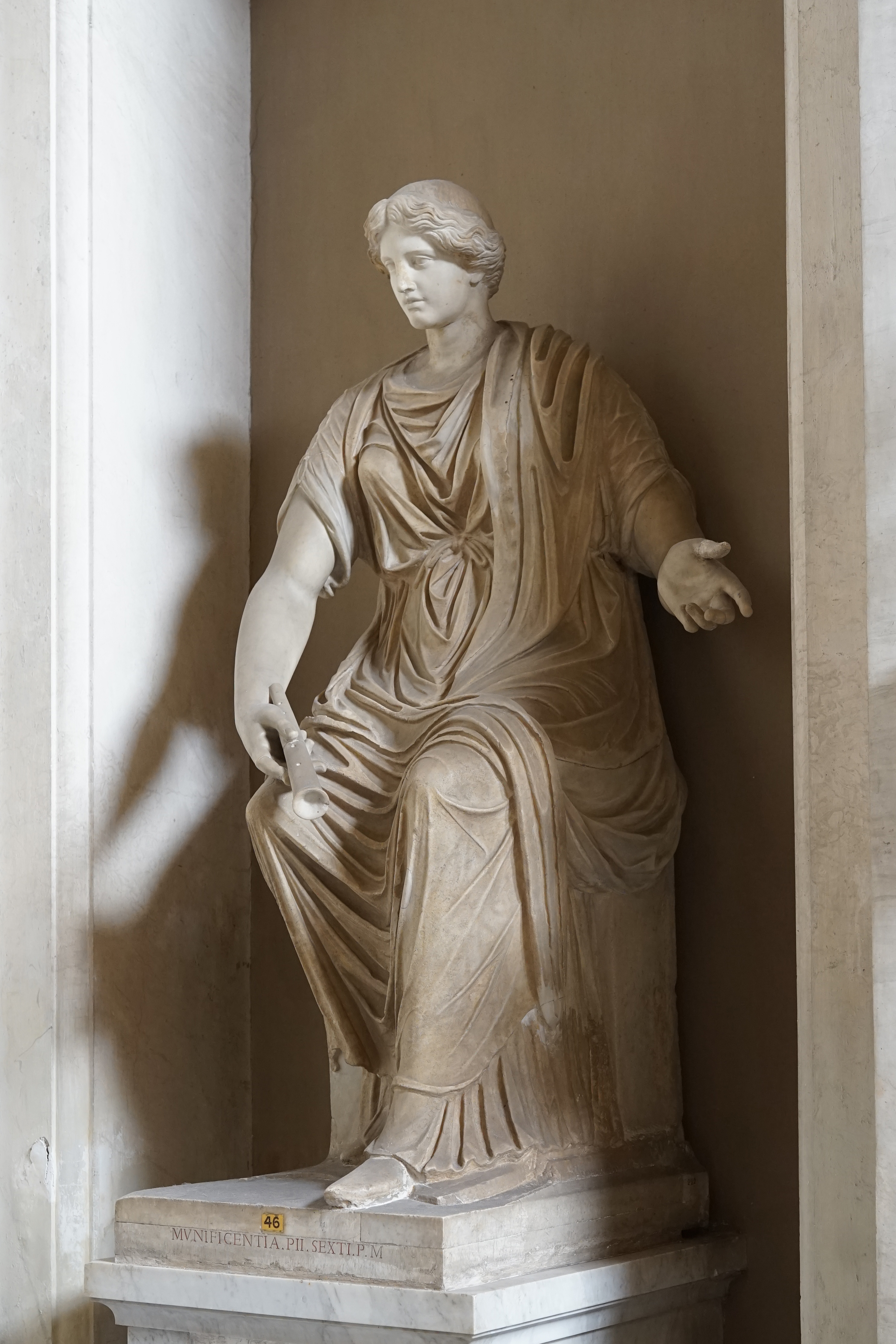
Muse Euterpe, II c. AD

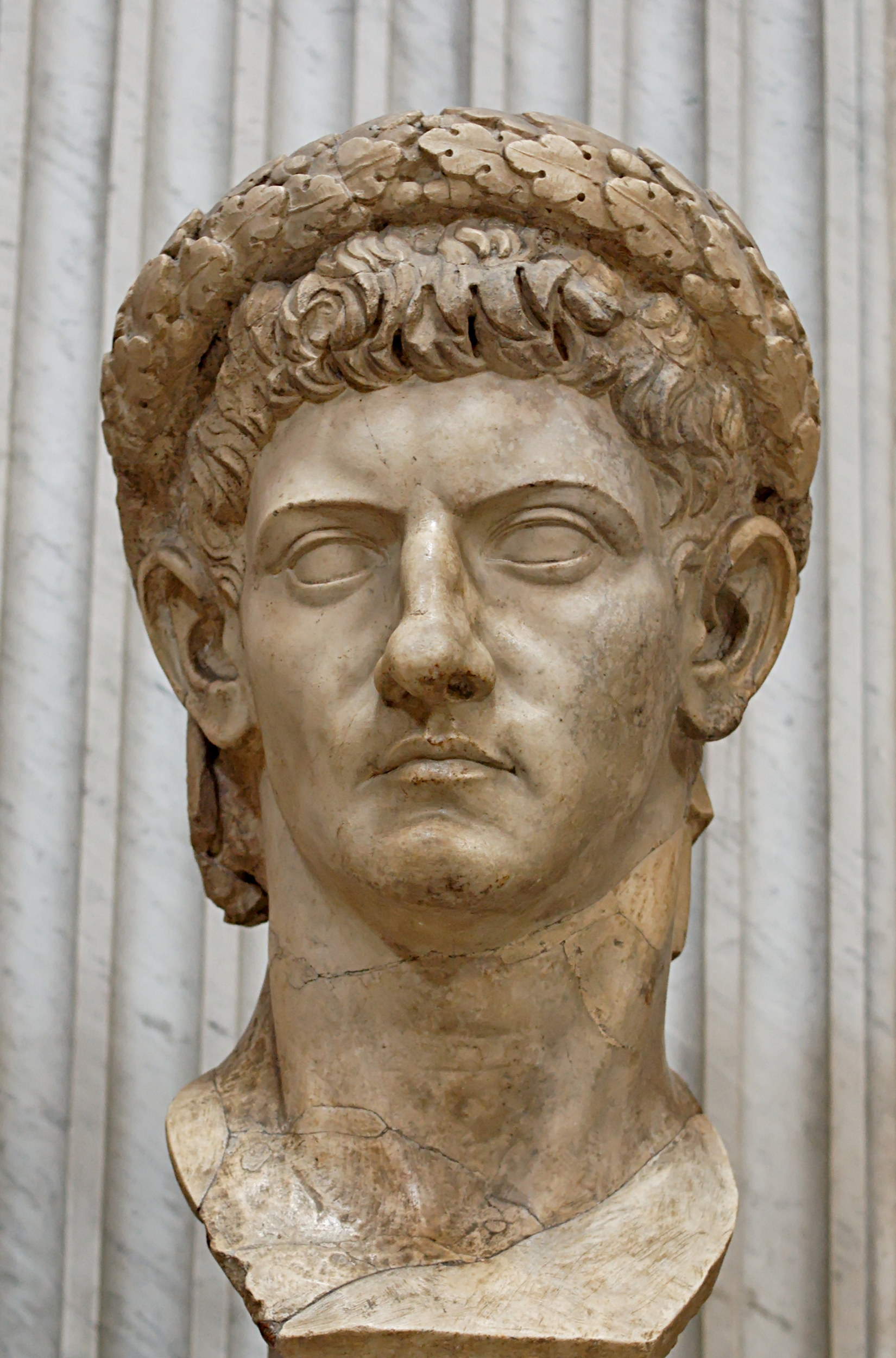
Claudius

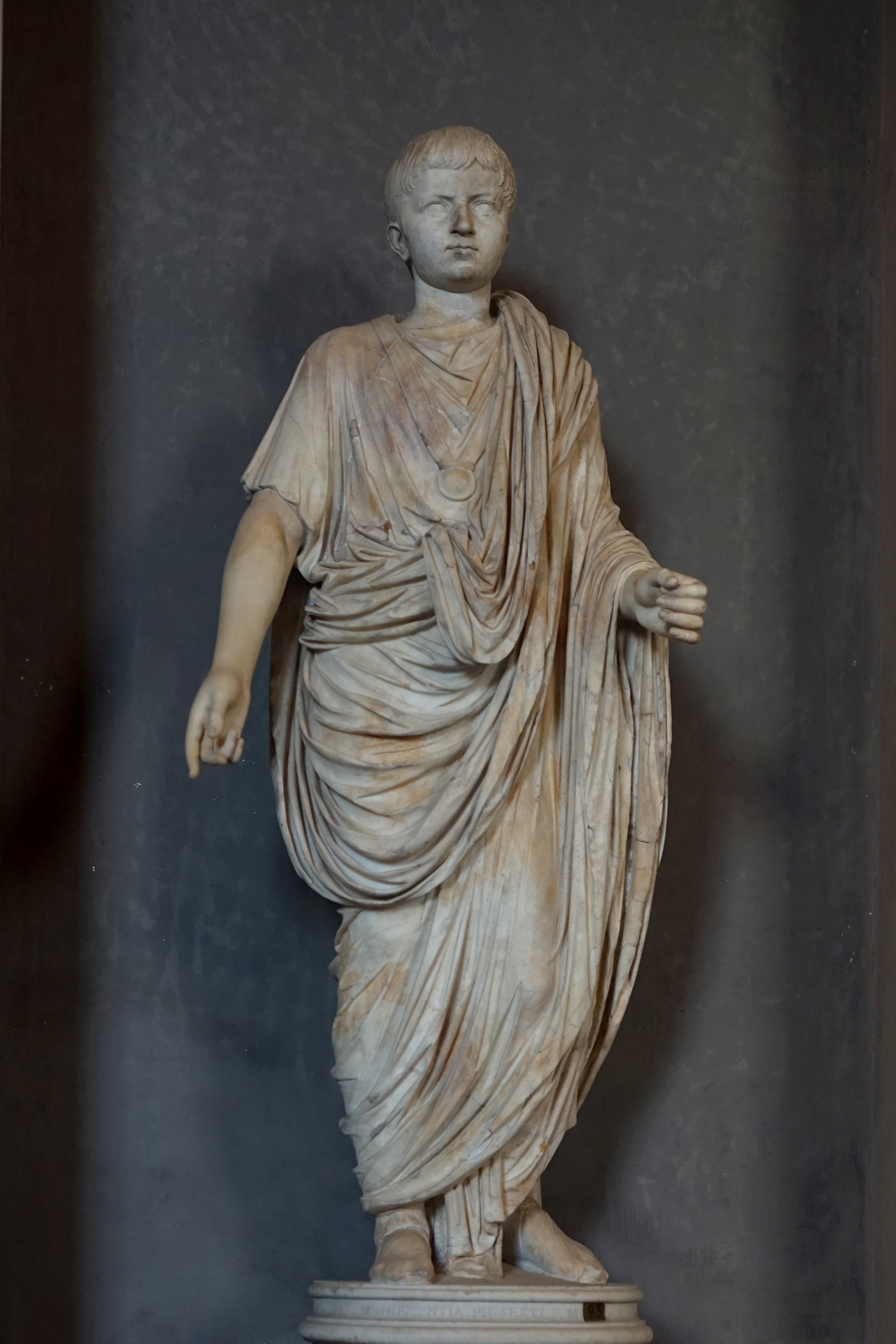
Britannicus, Son of Claudius

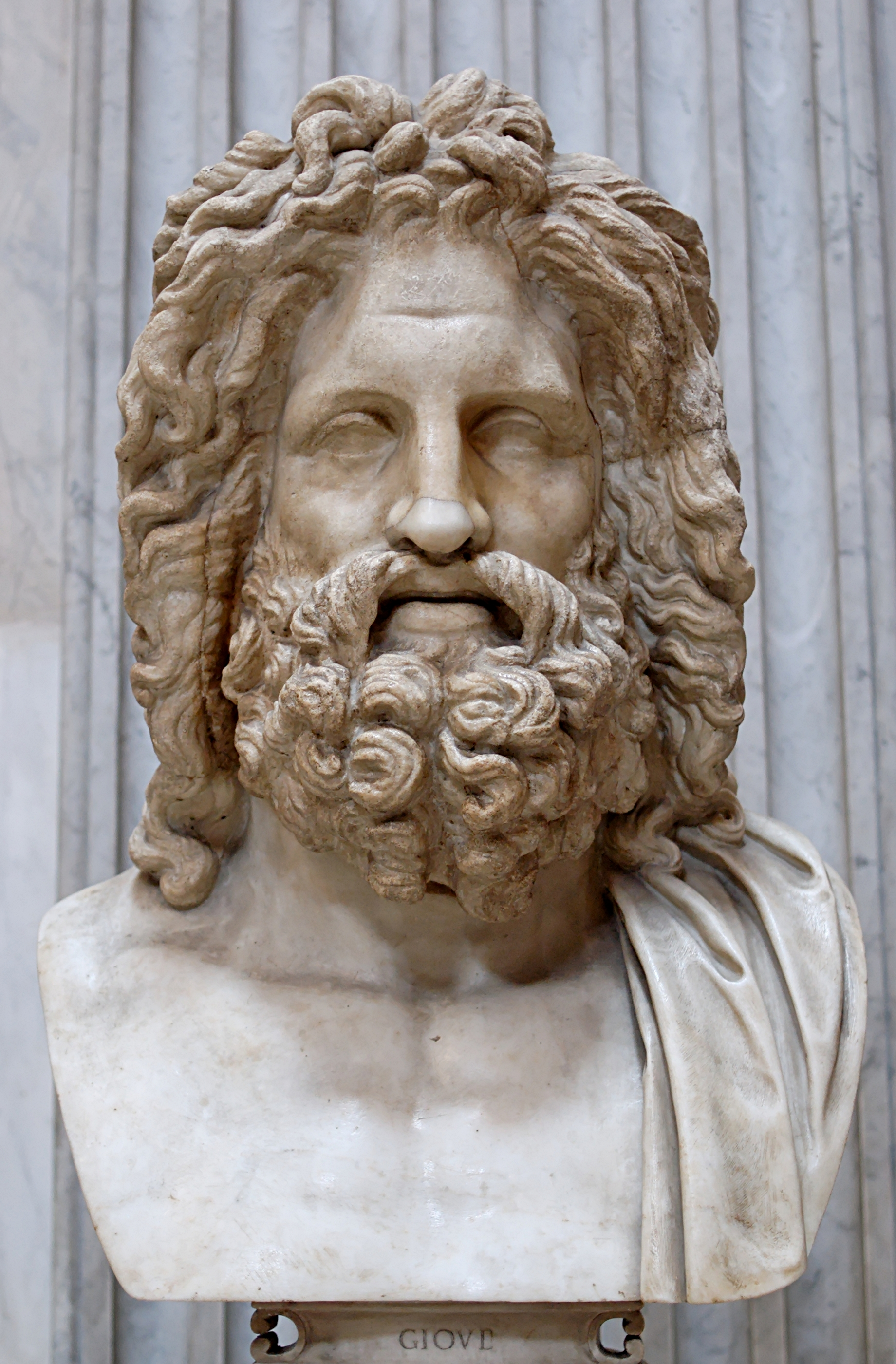
Zeus of Otricoli

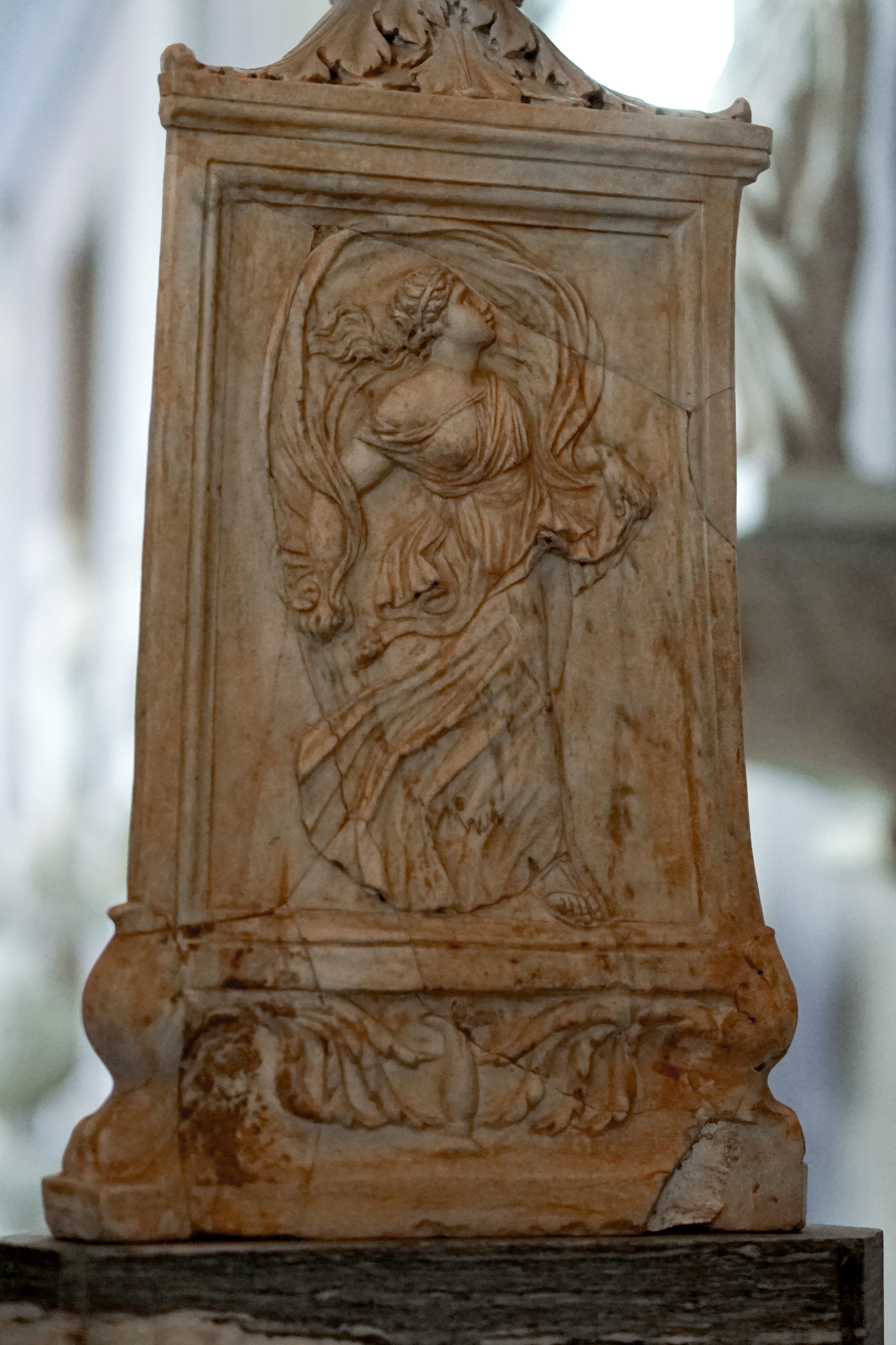
Candelabra of Otricoli, II c. AD
