= Justus Georg Westphal =

German astronomer and mathematician

Justus Georg Westphal (18 March 1824 – 9 November 1859) was a German astronomer and mathematician.

Westphal is not to be confused with Johann Heinrich Westphal (1794 – 1831). Within the NASA Astrophysics Data System (ADS) he also appears to be confused with a third Westphal, "Alfred Friedrich Julius Westphal" ("Dr. A. Westphal"), a geophysicist who lived from 1 August 1850 to 1924, and who first published in 1881. J. G. Westphal is only mentioned a few times in the ADS, between 1853 and 1859.

== Life ==
Westphal was born on 18 March 1824 in Colborn near Lüchow. He received his PhD at the University of Göttingen in 1852, his thesis being published as Evolutio readicum aequationum algebraicarum e ternis terminis constantium in series infinitas.

He was a student of the famous mathematician Carl Friedrich Gauss, who was also Director of Göttingen Observatory. During this period Westphal assisted at the observatory, where he held the title of Observator. In 1854, Westphal was appointed as a lecturer, but by the time of Gauss's death in 1855, he had resigned from his astronomical duties and had been replaced by his colleague Ernst Friedrich Wilhelm Klinkerfues.

Westphal is chiefly known for discovering the periodic comet 20D/Westphal (a.k.a. 20D/1852 O1, 1852 IV, D/Westphal 1) on 24 July 1852. C. H. F. Peters independently discovered the same comet from Constantinople on 3 August. Although it returned in 1913 (20D/1913 S1, 1913 VI, 1913d), the comet failed to return in 1976 and is now considered lost. There is substantial evidence that the comet completely disintegrated before reaching perihelion during its 1913 apparition. Westphal did not discover any other comets or any asteroids, though he made many observations of asteroids and calculated the orbital elements of several.

Westphal, who had suffered from poor health for much of his life, died on 9 November 1859 in Lüneburg.
