= Vicarello Cups =

Inscribed cups listing road stations Rome-Cadiz

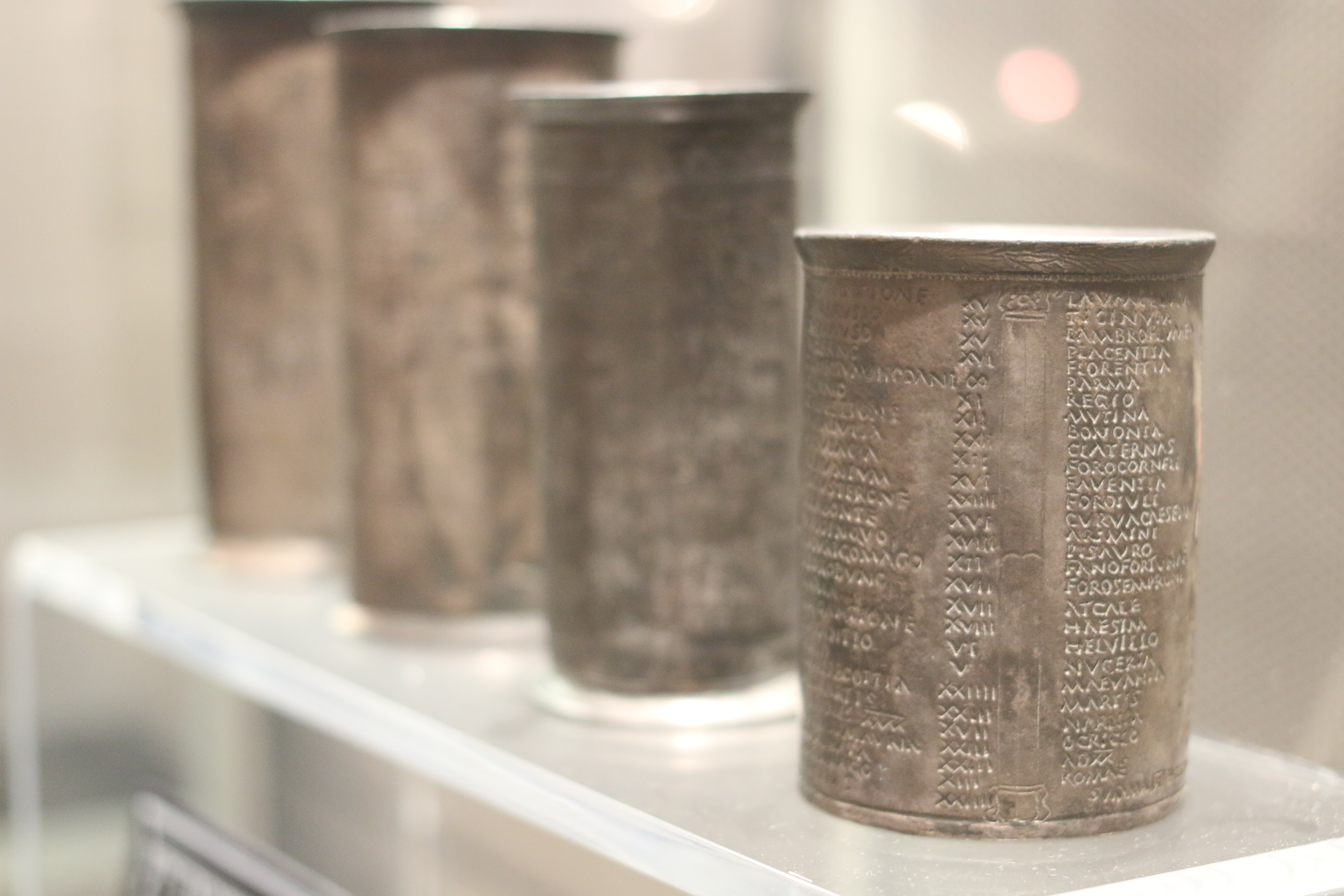
Vicarello Cups (Museo Nazionale Romano)

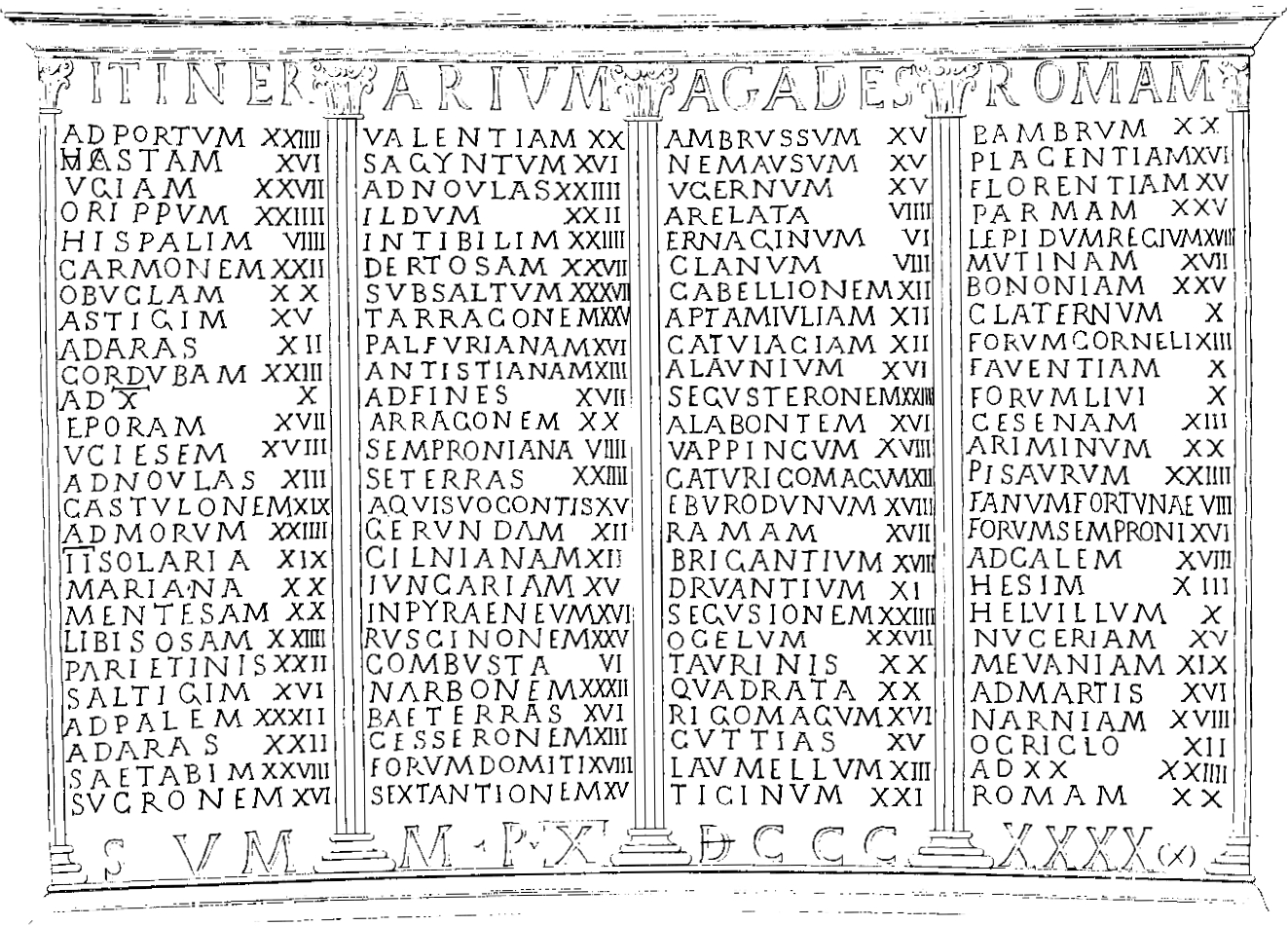
The itinerary on one of the cups

The Vicarello Cups are four silver cups discovered in 1852 in the healing sanctuary and baths of Aquae Apollinares, at Vicarello, Italy, near Lake Bracciano. Their appearance recalls Roman milestones and they are engraved with the route from ancient Gades (modern Cadiz) to Rome.

== History ==
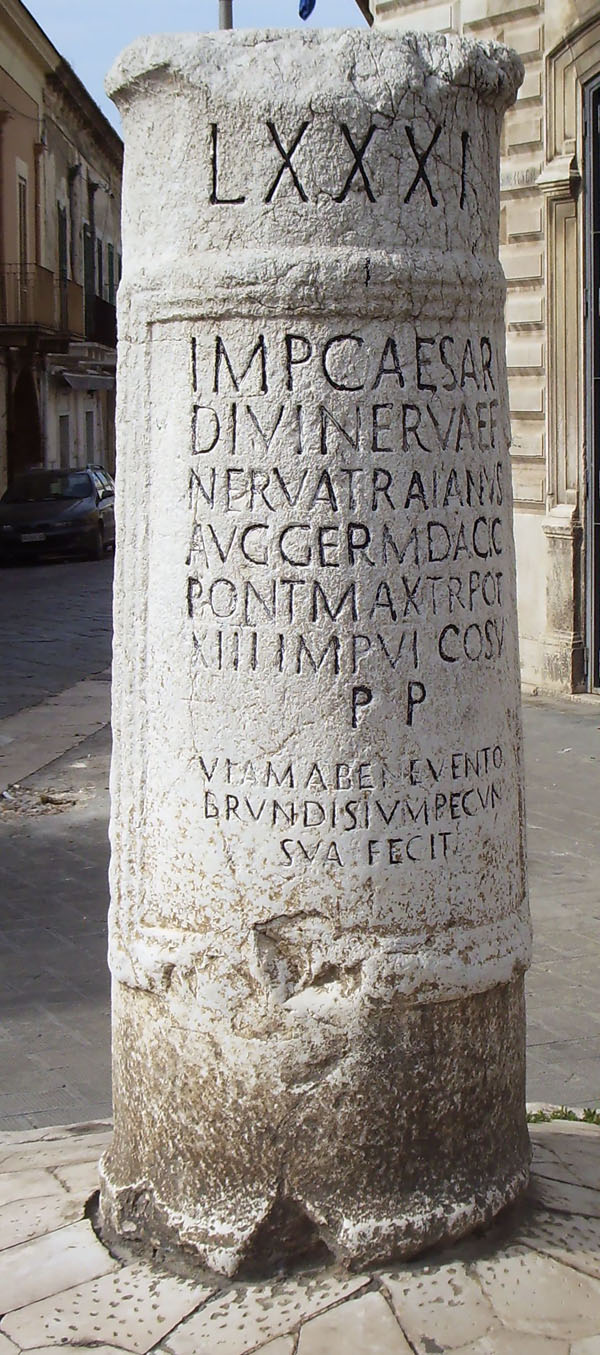
Roman milestone in Cerignola, Italy

The cups were discovered in 1852 when the existing bath complex near Vicarello was developed into a more modern one. The cups were found inside a crevice in the rock from which the thermal waters issued, along with a huge votive deposit consisting of ca. 5,000 bronze coins of Greek, Etruscan and Roman origin, including ca. 400 kilograms (880 lb) of aes rude (bronze dating from 8th-4th c. BC), 34 vessels (3 of gold, 25 of silver, 6 of bronze) of which 12 were inscribed (including the cups themselves), and various metal objects such as plates, small statues in bronze and other materials.

Most of the finds from the deposit, including the cups, are to be found in the Museo Nazionale Romano, while a few of the numismatic finds are in the Vatican Museums. The collection belonged originally to the Kircher Museum, which was later incorporated into the Museo Nazionale. Many of the coins from the original discovery were not recorded.

Dated to the 1st century AD, the cups are cylindrical in form and range in height from 9.5–11.5 cm (3.7–4.5 in), and are similar in shape to Roman milestones. They are inscribed on their outside with an itinerary that goes from Gades (modern Cádiz) overland to Rome, including all the 104 stopping points along the way and the distances between them, for a total of 1840 Roman miles (2,723.2 km (1,692.1 mi)).

The cups are thought to have been manufactured in Spain.

== Interpretation ==
The finds are believed to have been part of a votive deposit, consisting of dedications made by the sick who sought a cure at the baths, likely to the protective deity of the location, Apollo.

The presence of the cups with the inscribed itinerary has raised several questions. They do not seem to have any relationship to the divinity of the location and in fact the route on the cups, which includes the Via Flaminia in Italy, does not include Vicarello, instead passing dozens of kilometers to the east, through Narnia (modern Narni) and Ocriculum (modern Otricoli). One hypothesis is that the cups were dedicated to Apollo as a thank offering for the accomplished trip, by merchants from Gades who traveled to Rome for business. This hypothesis does not explain why these merchants would have preferred the much longer land route to the faster and likely less expensive one by sea.

A second hypothesis is that these cups were donated by travelers from Spain to the Roman senator Lucius Junius Caesennius Paetus, a relative of the emperor Domitian who had a villa in the town of Vicarello. These merchants would then later have dedicated the cups to Apollo.

== Bibliography ==
- CIL XI, 3281, 3282, 3283, 3284
- Giuseppe Marchi, La stipe tributata alle divinità delle Acque Apollinari, Roma, 1852
- Jacques Heurgon, La date des gobelets de Vicarello, Bordeaux, Revue des Études Anciennes N.54, 1952
- Ernst Künzl, Susanna Künzl, Aquae Apollinares / Vicarello (Italien), Caesarodunum, N.26, 1992
- Lidio Gasperini, El tesoro de Vicarello. Un gran descubrimiento arqueológico del siglo XIX, Madrid, Gerión ISSN 0213-0181 Vol. 26 núm 2, 2008

== Related ==
- Via Domitia
- Antonine Itinerary
- Peutinger Table
