= Itinerarium =

Ancient Roman travel guide in the form of a list

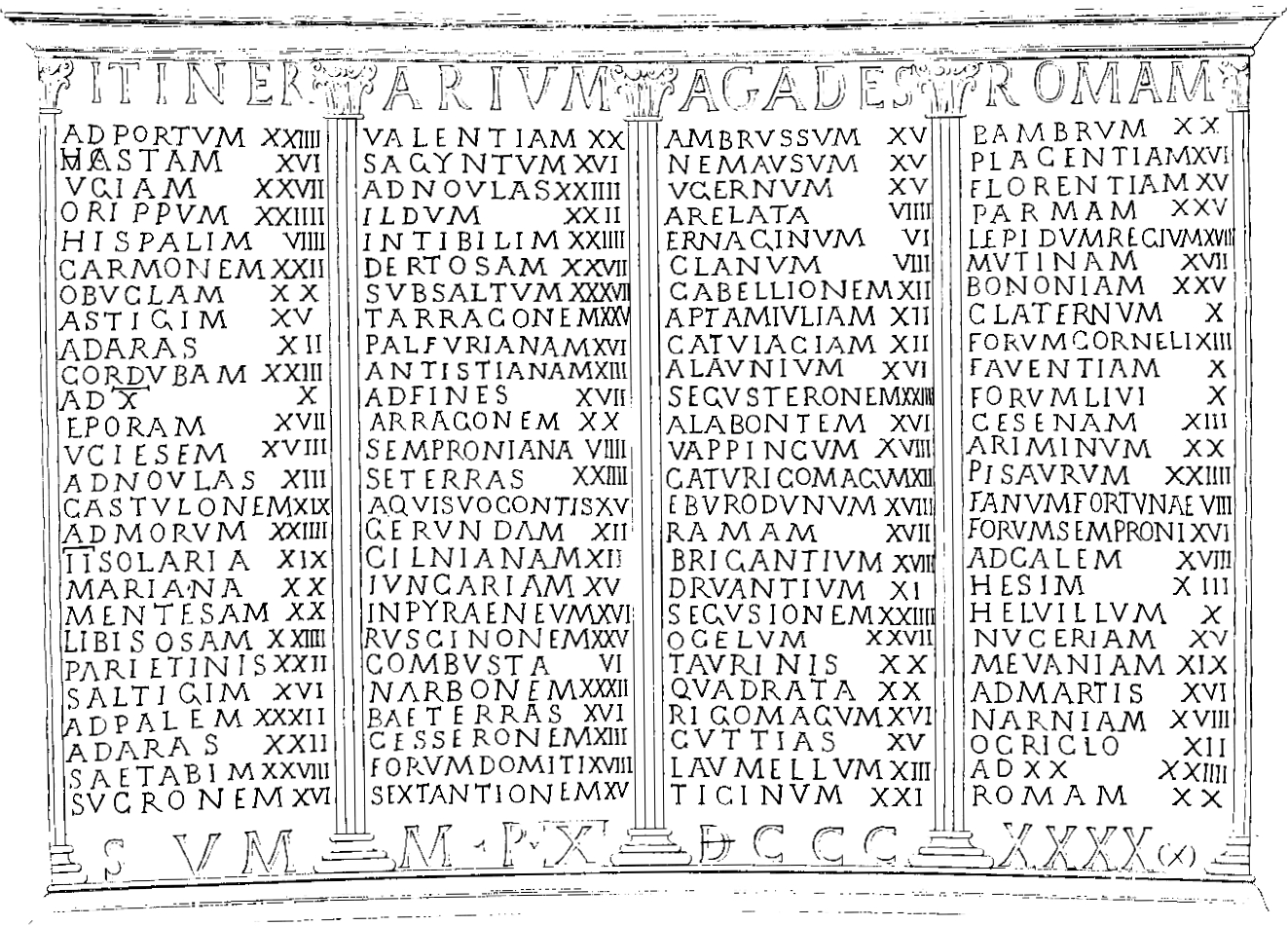
An itinerarium, as seen on one of the 1st century Vicarello Cups

An itinerarium (plural: itineraria) was an ancient Roman travel guide in the form of a listing of cities, villages (vici) and other stops on the way, including the distances between each stop and the next. Surviving examples include the Antonine Itinerary and the Bordeaux Itinerary. The term later evolved to take on broader meanings (see later meanings below).

These text-based route descriptions were complemented by physical markers on the ground, such as the miliarium, or Roman milestone, which confirmed distances along the described route.

== Ancient practice ==
The Romans, and ancient travellers in general, did not use maps. While illustrated maps existed as specialty items, they were hard to copy and not in general use. Using the Roman roads, however, the traveller needed some idea of where they were going, how to get there, and how long it would take. The itinerarium filled this need. In origin, it was simply a list of cities along a road: "at their most basic, itineraria involve the transposition of information given on milestones, which were an integral feature of the major Roman roads, to a written script."

It was only a short step from lists to a master list. To organize the lists, authors diagrammed parallel lines to show the branches of the roads. Parts of these were copied and sold on the streets: the very best featured symbols for cities, way stations, watercourses, and so on. The maps did not depict landforms, but they served as simple schematics for the user.

The government, from time to time, undertook to produce a master itinerary of all Roman roads. Julius Caesar and Mark Antony commissioned the first known such effort in 44 BCE. Zenodoxus, Theodotus of Byzantium, and Polykleitos the Younger, three Greek geographers, were hired to survey the system and compile a master itinerary. This task required over 25 years. The result was a stone-engraved master itinerarium set up near the Pantheon, from which travellers and itinerary sellers could make copies.

== Vicarello cups ==
Archaeology has turned up some itinerary material in unexpected places. The four Vicarello Cups, made of silver and dated to 1st century AD, were found in 1852 by workmen excavating a foundation at Vicarello (near Bracciano), 37 kilometres (23 miles) northwest of Rome. They are engraved with the names and distances of 104 stations on the road between Gades (modern-day Cádiz) and Rome, covering in total a distance of 1,840 Roman miles (2,723.2 km (1,692.1 mi)). Believed to be a votive offering by merchants travelling from Gades to Rome, the inscription is a valuable source of information about the road network at the time, and scholars refer to this artefact as the Itinerarium Gaditanum. Similarly, the Itinerarium Burdigalense (Bordeaux Itinerary) is a description of a route taken by a pilgrim from Bordeaux in France to the Holy Land in AD 333.

== Later meanings ==
The term changed meaning over the centuries. For example, the Itinerarium Alexandri is a list of the conquests of Alexander the Great. In the medieval period, the term was applied to guide-books written by travelers, most of which were accounts of pilgrimages to the Holy Land.

== See also ==
- Tabula Peutingeriana
- Periplus
