= The Eighth Day (Westphal book) =

Book by Euler Renato Westphal

- Author: Euler Westphal
- Language: Portuguese
- Publication date: 2020

The Eighth Day is the second book of Euler Renato Westphal, originally published in Portuguese with the title O Oitavo Dia: Na era da seleção natural.

In the second book of Euler Westphal, professor of Systematic Theology and Ethical Issues, the Brazilian researcher analyses the scientific and technological advancement to propose a multidisciplinary dialogue about bioethics.

This book is at the basis of the curriculum of the Interdisciplinarity Seminarium of the Lutheran School of Theology in São Bento do Sul, Brazil. It's also an important book in the discussion of the Theology as a science, and its relationship with other sciences particularly Biology, and Philosophical Ethics.

He finds on the post-modern thinking and its concepts of performativity, utility, and lucrativity, and the Bauhaus model of bricolage a new scientific paradigm. The post-modern paradigm broke with the modern paradigm of rationality.

The post-modernism look at the nature as a good thing when it is useful to the humankind, because science and human power are coincident. In the post-modern religion the eschatological and messianic hope is no more in Jesus Christ, but in the efforts to find out a possibility to immortality, good wealth and eternal life through genetical improvement. The wishes of the post-modern man are to reach the perfect human being, the great wealth, without illness and death, the brave new world.

When science becomes religion and the scientists become priests the humankind starts a new age of totalitarianism of science. The reality of the Almighty God, Creator and Redeemer, is no more recognized by post-modern man, who now adopt the performativity and lucrativity as a new dogma of scientific religion. Predestination is no more a Christian dogma but a concept of biotechnology. The scientist can see, as a small-great-god, who is predestined by the genetic code to develop an illness, like a cancer. Therefore, the scientist became the one who can choose life or death for a new life under formation. 88 There are many risks on see the science as a religion. Or to put the science as criteria of truth, specially this kind of science that has on post-modern thinking its epistemological base. The practice of get patents of living being its one of these kinds of risks. When an economical group has the patent of a soy bean, than the farmers cannot produce soy without pay royalties to the company that has the patent rights. So poor people at south countries will have their free access to seeds for planting not allowed, in consequence they will not have food for their countries.

The bioethics is multidisciplinary subject, it dialogues with different ethical issues like philosophical ethics, medical ethics, theological ethics and so one. Theology can give its contribution on situations like abort, euthanasia, research with living beings. The Christian faith can recover the respect with life and its mystery.

In the Eighth Day the human being has created the brave new world. The little-man-god redesigned the life beings and the human being as image and likeness of the Market-God's utilitarists interests. We need to give the appropriate place to the creation and to the human beings as creation of the Triune God. All things are maintained by the presence of His Holy Spirit. Humility of the science will guarantee that science still be science and not became a religion that promise eternal life, immortality and salvation.
