= Westfall =

Westfall may refer to:

- Anne Westfall, game programmer
- Bob Westfall, American football player
- Buzz Westfall, American lawyer and politician
- Catherine Westfall, American historian of science
- Ed Westfall, hockey player
- Gary Westfall, American physicist and textbook author
- James Westfall, jazz vibraphonist
- L. L. Westfall (1865–1927), American politician
- Morris Westfall, American politician
- Richard S. Westfall, American historian of science
- Stacy Westfall, horse trainer
- Steve Westfall (born 1955), American politician from West Virginia
- Thomas D. Westfall, American politician and FBI agent
