= Søren Westphal =

Danish handball player (born 1986)

Personal information
- Full name: Søren Westphal
- Nationality: Danish
- Born: 8 July 1986 (age 40) Odense, Denmark
- Height: 2.00 m (6 ft 7 in)

Sport
- Sport: Handball
- Position: Goalkeeper
- Current club: Retired

Senior clubs
- Years: Team
- 2003-2006: GOG
- 2006-2009: TMS Ringsted
- 2009-2012: Nordsjælland Håndbold
- 2012-2014: KIF Kolding København
- 2014-2020: Aalborg Håndbold

Søren Westphal (born 8 July 1986) is a Danish former handballer.

== Career ==
He retired in 2020 after having played for Danish Handball League side Aalborg Håndbold since 2014. He joined the club from KIF Kolding København. He had previously played for league rivals club GOG Svendborg, TMS Ringsted and Nordsjælland Håndbold.

During his youth career, Westphal played several matches for the Danish national youth handball teams.

In 2015 during a playoff match against Herning he had a cruciate ligament injury that kept him out for many months.

In February 2017 he got his second concussion in the same season, when the Skjern Håndbold player Bjarte Myrhol hit him in the face during a match. He never truly recovered from the injury, and retired in 2020 as a consequence.

== Private ==
He has a mercantile education from Copenhagen Business School.
