= Zeus of Otricoli =

Bust of the Greek god Zeus

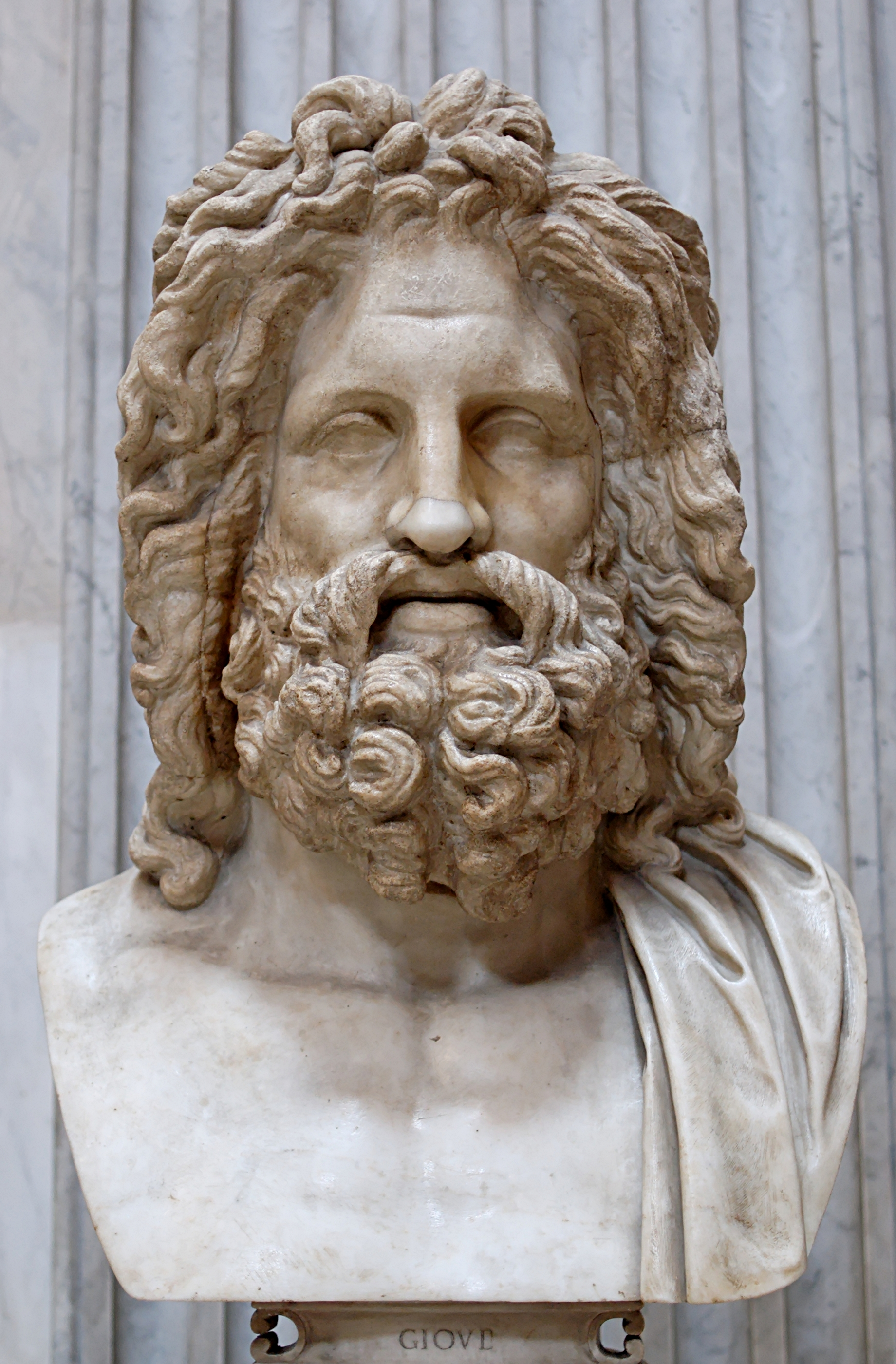
Zeus of Otricoli

The Zeus of Otricoli is an Ancient Roman bust found in Otricoli, Italy, in 1775 during the excavation financed by Pope Pius VI. It is on display in the Sala Rotonda of the Pio-Clementine Vatican Museum.

== Attribution ==
The bust is presumed to be a Roman copy of a Hellenistic original, dating to around the 4th century BC. The bust is probably produced during the epoch of Alexander the Great and sometimes considered a modification by Lysippos, his favorite sculptor.

While some attributed the bust as a copy of the statue of Pheidias at Olympia, numismatic reproductions of that famous statue would suggest otherwise. It appears to be more likely from subsequent centuries. Some scholars consider that the head comes from a seated sculpture, part of his iconography that portray Zeus as a paternalistic god. Built from Carrara marble, the sculpture retains the impress of the Pheidian original such as the half-opened mouth. However, it is distinctive in several aspects. For instance, the head no longer adhered to the Pheidian depth, while the center of the face is broader and more deeply marked.

== Copies ==
The Zeus of Otricoli was copied, and used as the head of God the Father, by the baroque sculptor Stephan Schwaner, who made statues for the attic of the Holy Trinity Church in Warsaw. The figure of God the Father is currently placed on the battlefield of Raszyn in Falenty, Poland.

Other copies of the Zeus of Otricoli are held in the Cornell University cast collection in New York, the Bowdoin College Art Museum in Maine and one graces an arch at the Boston Athenæum.
