= Euler Renato Westphal =

Brazilian pastor (born 1957)

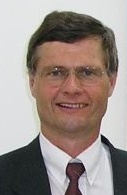
Euler Renato Westphal

Euler Renato Westphal (born July 2, 1957) is a university professor, writer and Lutheran theologian.

== Biography ==
Westphal earned a bachelor's degree in theology from Missions Seminary of St. Chrischona Pilgrim Mission (German: Pilgermission St. Chrischona) (Basel, Switzerland, 1978-1982). He worked eight years as a pastor in "Missão Evangélica União Cristã" (Christian Union Evangelical Mission), in Rio do Sul and Blumenau, Santa Catarina. He was also the founder of "Centro de Recuperação Nova Esperança" (New Hope Recover Center), a center for alcoholics and chemical dependents, and of a social work for poor families, the "Bom Amigo" (Good Friend), in Blumenau.

Since 1990, has been working full time as a professor of theology at Faculdade Luterana de Teologia (Lutheran College of Theology) and at the Universidade da Região de Joinville (Joiville Region University). In 1997, began doctor in Theology with his thesis at the Instituto Ecumênico de Pós-Graduação of the Escola Superior de Teologia, in São Leopoldo, RS.

Westphal is a researcher of bioethical issues, mainly in hospitals at Joinville, and he is member of the Research's Ethical Committee of the State of Santa Catarina.

== Works ==
- WESTPHAL, Euler Renato. Ciência e Bioética: um olhar teológico. São Leopoldo: Sinodal, 2009. (Science and Bioethics: a theological perspective).
- WESTPHAL, Euler Renato. Brincando no paraíso perdido: as estruturas religiosas da ciência. São Bento do Sul-SC: União Cristã, 2006. v. 1. 155 p. (Playing in the Lost Paradise: The Religious Structures of Science).
- WESTPHAL, Euler Renato. Bioética; série Para entender. São Leopoldo: Sinodal, 2006.104 p. ISBN 85-233-0824-5. (Bioethics; series "To understand").
  - Portuguese version at Google Books
- WESTPHAL, Euler Renato. O Oitavo dia – na era da seleção artificial (The Eighth Day Review) . 1. ed. São Bento do Sul: União Cristã, 2004. v. 01. 125 p. ISBN 85-87485-18-0. ( The Eighth Day in the Era of Artificial Selection–An Analysis about Post-Modern Thinking, Its Aesthetic Expressions and its Scientific Praxis).
- WESTPHAL, Euler Renato. O Deus Cristão: Um estudo sobre a teologia trinitária de Leonardo Boff. 1. ed. São Leopoldo: Editora Sinodal, 2003. v. 1. 351 p. ISBN 85-233-0732-X
- WESTPHAL, Euler Renato. Secularization, cultural heritage and the spirituality of the secular state between sacredness and secularization. 1Paderborn: Germany Ferdinand Schöningh, 2019. 119 p. ISBN 978-3-506-70260-9
