= 20D/Westphal =

Lost comet

Discovery
- Discovered by: Justus Georg Westphal
- Discovery date: 24 July 1852

Designations
- MPC designation: D/1852 O1; D/1913 S1
- Alternative designations: 1852 IV, 1913 VI, 1913d

Orbital characteristics
- Epoch: 1913-11-09 (JD 2420080.5)
- Observation arc: 61 years (Not observed in 112 years)
- Aphelion: 30.030 AU
- Perihelion: 1.2540 AU
- Semi-major axis: 15.642 AU
- Eccentricity: 0.9198
- Orbital period: 61.87 yr
- Inclination: 40.890°
- Last perihelion: 3 January 1976? (unobserved)
- Next perihelion: 4 May 2038? (lost since 1913)
- Comet total magnitude (M1): 8.8

20D/Westphal was a Halley-type comet with an orbital period of 61 years. The comet appeared to disintegrate during the 1913 apparition and has not been observed in 112 years.

== Observational history ==
The comet was originally discovered by the German astronomer Justus Georg Westphal from Göttingen, Germany on 24 July 1852. It was independently discovered by the American astronomer Christian Heinrich Friedrich Peters (Constantinople) on August 9. The comet exhibited many flunctuations in intristic brightness and reached an apparent magnitude of around 4 while a dust tail was also observed. It was last observed about 120 days after perihelion.

The comet was recovered on 27 September 1913, by Pablo T. Delavan from the La Plata Astronomical Observatory about 60 days before perihelion. However, the comet faded as it approached the Sun, losing its central condensation and the nucleus becoming elongated. The plates of the comet indicate that the disintegration began on October 1, when the comet was reported to be visible with the naked eye using averted vision. It was last observed on 26 November 1913. It was predicted to return in 1976 but was never observed, and is now considered a lost comet.

Numbered comets
Previous; 19P/Borrelly	20D/Westphal	Next; 21P/Giacobini–Zinner
