= Joachim Westphal (of Eisleben) =

Joachim Westphal (of Eisleben), a contemporary of Joachim Westphal (of Hamburg), with whom he is often confused, and belonging also to the Gnesio-Lutheran party. He was ordained a preacher at Nausitz near Artern in 1553, then served as diaconus in Sangerhausen and finally as preacher in Gerbstedt in the county of Mansfeld, where he died in 1569. He wrote Faulteufel, wider das Laster des Müssiggangs (1563); Wider den Hoffahrtsteufel (1565); Willkomm Christi (1568); Geistliche Ehe Christi und seiner Kirche, seiner Braut (1568).
