= Johann Heinrich Westphal =

German astronomer

Johann Heinrich Westphal (January 31, 1794 – 1831) was a German astronomer, mathematician, and geographer.

Westphal was born in Schwerin in 1794. After fighting as part of the Lützow Free Corps during the Napoleonic Wars, he studied at the University of Göttingen. In 1817, he received his doctorate with a thesis on the parallelogram of force. From 1820 to 1822, he lectured on astronomy in Stettin and published several papers. He translated Giuseppe Piazzi's Lezioni elementari di astronomia ad use del real osservatorio di Palermo into German as Lehrbuch der Astronomie in 1822.

In 1822, Westphal embarked on a research expedition to Egypt and Palestine with Peter von Medem and Gustav Parthey. He made a number of detailed sketches that were converted into an accurate map of Jerusalem, published as Jerusalem und seine nächsten Umgebungen in 1825 by Heinrich Berghaus in his journal Hertha. The map was largely forgotten by later cartographers in the 19th and 20th centuries.

His professional career was spent mostly in Italy, where he published several travel guides describing different regions in the Italian Peninsula under the name Justus Tommasini. He died in Sicily and was buried in the churchyard of Termini Imerese.
