= Hirayama =

Hirayama (written: 平山) is a Japanese surname. Notable people with the surname include:

- Aya Hirayama (平山 あや, born 1984), Japanese actress
- Hideyuki Hirayama (平山 秀幸, born 1950), Japanese film director
- Ikuo Hirayama (平山 郁夫, 1930–2009), Japanese painter
- Kiyotsugu Hirayama (平山 清次, 1874–1943), who discovered the Hirayama families of asteroids
- Koichiro Hirayama (平山 紘一郎, born 1946), Japanese sport wrestler
- Kōji Hirayama (平山 幸司, born 1969), Japanese politician
- Lalla Hirayama (born 1988), South African television host, actress, dancer and model
- Nathan Hirayama (born 1988), Canadian rugby player
- Satoshi Hirayama (平山 智, 1931–2021), Japanese American baseball player
- Shin Hirayama (平山 信, 1868–1945), first Japanese astronomer to discover an asteroid
- Sōta Hirayama (平山 相太, born 1985), an international football (soccer) player
- Tomonori Hirayama (平山 智規, born 1978), Japanese football player
- Yu Hirayama (平山 優, born 1985), Japanese badminton player
- Yuji Hirayama (平山 ユージ, born 1969), Japanese rock climber

== See also ==
- 1999 Hirayama, an asteroid
- Hirayama (crater), lunar crater
- Hirayama family, a family of asteroids
- Hirayama Station, a train station in Chiba Prefecture
- Hirayama syndrome, a lower motor neuron disease
