= Saha =

Saha may refer to:

- Saha (surname), a Bengali Hindu surname

== People ==
- Arati Saha (1940–1994), Indian long-distance swimmer
- Arthur W. Saha, Science Fiction and Fantasy editor
- Arun Saha, Bangladeshi actor and musician
- Debojit Saha, Indian singer
- Gopinath Saha, Bengali activist for Indian independence
- Louis Saha, French former footballer
- Meghnad Saha, an Indian astrophysicist and discoverer of the Saha ionization equation
- Ranadaprasad Saha, Bengali businessman, social activist
- Surjit Saha, Indian television actor and model
- Wriddhiman Saha, Indian cricketer

== Other ==
- Sahā world, a concept in Buddhism
- Saha, Ambala, a village in India
- Saha, Estonia, a village in Estonia
- Saha, Iran, a village in Zanjan Province, Iran
- Saha (crater), a lunar impact crater on the far side of the Moon
- Saha Airlines, an Iranian airline
- Saha District, a district of the city of Busan, South Korea
- Saha Station, a station of the Busan Metro Line 1
- Saha ionization equation, relating the densities of atoms/ions/electrons in a plasma; also known as the Saha-Langmuir equation
- Saha, the Chartreux cat from the novella La Chatte by Colette

== Acronym ==
- SAHA for suberoyl-anilide hydroxamic acid, an anticancer agent (Vorinostat)
- SAHA (Iran aviation), an Iranian aviation company
- San Antonio Housing Authority, a housing authority in Texas
- Saskatchewan Amateur Hockey Association, now known as Hockey Saskatchewan
- South African Hockey Association, the governing body of field hockey in South Africa

== See also ==
- Sahas
- Sakha (disambiguation)
