= Hisashi Terao =

Japanese astronomer and mathematician

- 寺尾寿
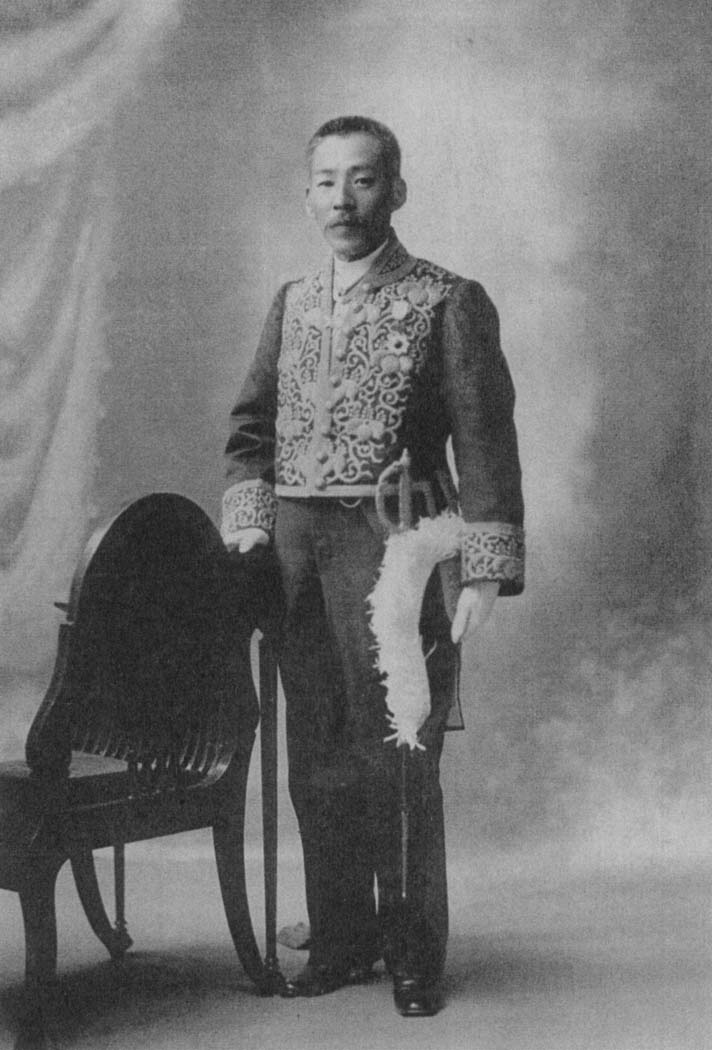
- Born: November 4, 1855; Naka District, Chikuzen Province (now Fukuoka Prefecture), Japan
- Died: August 6, 1923 (aged 67)
- Education: Tokyo Imperial University, University of Paris
- Scientific career
- Fields: Astronomy
- Workplaces: Tokyo Imperial University (now Tokyo University), The Tokyo Academy of Physics (now Tokyo University of Science)

Hisashi Terao (寺尾 寿, Terao Hisashi) (1855-1923) was a Japanese astronomer and mathematician. He graduated from the Tokyo imperial University as well as from the University of Paris, and he was one of the founding members and the first principal of The Tokyo Academy of Physics (now Tokyo University of Science). Notable students that studied under him include Shin Hirayama, Hisashi Kimura, and Kiyotsugu Hirayama. He is also called one of the first astronomers of the Meiji era.

== Biography ==
Terao was born as the eldest son to Kiheita Terao, a samurai of the Fukuoka Domain in Haruyoshi village, Naka District, Chikuzen Province, Japan (now Nakasu, Hakata-ku, Fukuoka, Fukuoka Prefecture). He studied at the Shuyukan Han school (currently Fukuoka Prefectural Shuyukan High School) and went on in 1873 to stay in Tokyo where he took a course in French language at the Tokyo School of Foreign Studies (currently, Tokyo University of Foreign Studies) which he completed before enrolling at a Kaisei school (which would later become Tokyo University) where he majored in physics. He would also go on to study astronomy under foreign government advisor Emile-Jean Lépissier before completing his physics course and graduating from the physics department of Tokyo University. In 1879, he went to study in France on a government-funded exchange program where he would continue to further his studies in astronomy and mathematics.

On July 12, he began as an apprentice at the Montsouris Observatory in Paris before beginning his course of mathematics and celestial mechanics at the University of Paris on November 1. In December he would go on to study practical aspects of his course in the Paris Observatory. After completing his course, he was granted a bachelor's degree of mathematical science. In 1882, he joined a French government-organized observation of the transit of Venus on the island of Martinique in the Caribbean Sea, he also visited some observatories in the United States. He returned to Japan the following year in 1883.

Following his return, he became an assistant chief of staff for the Ministry of Education, Culture, Sports, Science and Technology. He also worked on longitude and latitude determinate in Sendai, which saw the first use of a Meridian circle in latitude determination in Japanese history. He helped found The Tokyo Academy of Physics and became its first principal. In 1884, he became a professor of astronomy at the academy, and it was at this time he would go on to give lectures in universities as a mathematician on topics such as elliptic functions and theta functions.

He was a proponent for the romanization of the Japanese language, and in January 1885 he along with Masakazu Tomoya, Ryōkichi Yatabe, Yamakawa Kenjirō, Naokichi Matsui, Arikata Kumamoto, and Jirō Kitao, founded the Rōmaji-kai (羅馬字会, "Romanization Group"). On the second of June 1886 he became head of the National Astronomical Observatory of Japan. In 1889 he attended an assembly of the International Association of Geodesy, where he bought back an international prototype meter to Japan.

=== Portrait ===
In 1883, 17-year-old Japanese artist Kuroda Seiki studied French under Hisashi Terao, and passed the entrance exam for the French course at the Tokyo School of Foreign Languages. In 1909, in celebration of the 25th anniversary of Terao's tenure at the Tokyo Imperial University, Kuroda Seiki drew a portrait of Terao in appreciation of him.

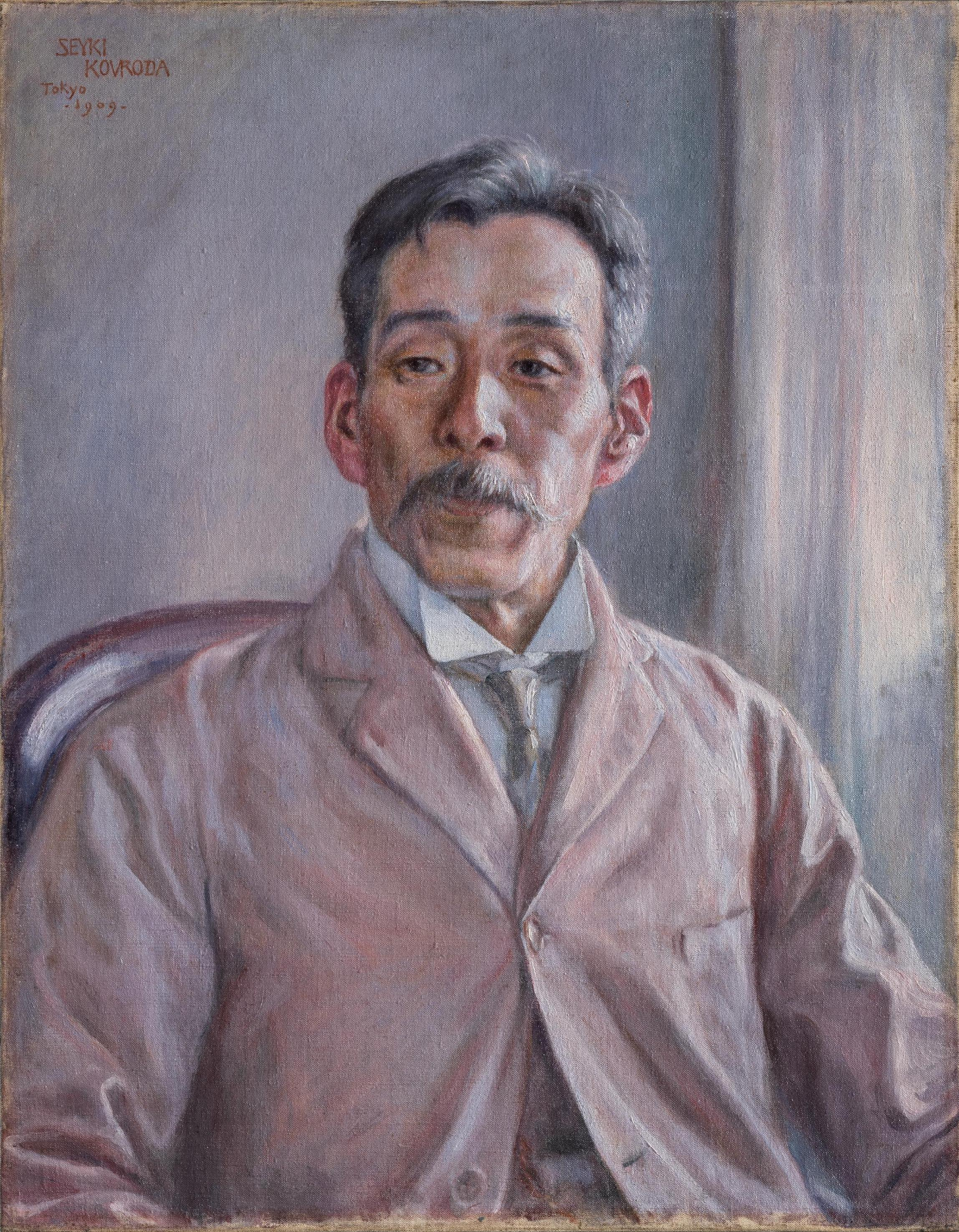
Portrait of Dr. Hisashi Terao, by Kuroda Seiki
