= Moon craters with Japanese names =

There are a number of objects in the Solar System that have been named after Japanese people or places. Many of these are craters on the terrestrial planets.

- Asada (crater)
- Hatanaka (crater)
- Hirayama (crater)
- Murakami (crater)
- Nagaoka (crater)
- Naonobu (crater)
- Yamamoto (crater)
- Nishina (crater)
- Kimura (crater)
- Onizuka (crater)
