= Sakha =

Sakha may refer to:

- Sakha Republic, a federal subject of Russia
- Sakha language, or Yakut, a Turkic language
- Sakha people, also Yakuts, a Turkic people
- Sakha scripts, writing systems for the Sakha language
- Sakha, Egypt, a town also known as Xois
- Sakha, Iran, a village in Zanjan Province, Iran
- Sakha Consulting Wings, a taxi service provided by women for women in Delhi, India

== See also ==
- Saha (disambiguation)
- Saka (disambiguation)
- Sakhi (disambiguation)
- Sakhavu (disambiguation)
