= Sakhi (disambiguation) =

A Sakhi is a historical account of Sikhism.

Sakhi may also refer to:

- Sakhi, Iran, a village in Khuzestan Province
- Sakhi, Nepal, a village
- Sakhi for South Asian Women, an anti-domestic violence organization
- Sakhi Dad Mujahid, former Deputy Defence Minister of Afghanistan under Taliban rule
- Sakhi (Meshrano Jirga representative), Afghan politician
- Sakhi (2008 film), an Indian Marathi-language film
- Sakhi (2023 film), an Indian Telugu-language film
- Sakhi (TV series), an Indian TV series on Colors Marathi
- Sakhi (magazine), an Indian fortnightly women's interest magazine published in the Kannada-language
- Alaipayuthey, a 2000 Indian Tamil-language film, dubbed into Telugu with the title Sakhi

== See also ==
- Sakhiya, a 2004 Indian film
- Gopi, a historical account in Hinduism
- Sakha (disambiguation)
- Sakhavu (disambiguation)
