= Mega Cabs =

Indian taxi company

- Company type: Private
- Industry: Transport
- Founded: New Delhi, India (February 2002)
- Founder: Kunal Lalani
- Headquarters: New Delhi, India
- Area served: New Delhi, Chandigarh, Bangalore, Chennai, Amritsar
- Services: Cab, bus
- Website: www.megacabs.com

Mega Cabs is a radio taxi service provider in India, present in six cities in India with a fleet size of 2,500 cars. The company was founded in 2002 by Kunal Lalani. It is one of the first radio taxi service providers in India.

== History ==
Mega Cabs began its operations in 2002 in New Delhi. The company initially started with a fleet size of 50 cars and currently has a fleet of 2,500 cars. It is a part of the Association of Radio Taxis, a group of taxi service providers that operate taxi services which are regulated and licensed as opposed to technology-based companies like Uber. In 2020, the company changed its name to Mega Mobility.

== Services ==
Mega Cabs is a radio-call taxi service and offers dedicated airport transfers in the cities it operates in, and operates a luxury airport transfer service in Delhi/NCR. It also offers outstation services across different cities in India, and last-mile connectivity and employee transportation services. Cab bookings can be made using the website, through the hotline number, or the dedicated app available on all mobile platforms.

== See also ==
- Taxis in India
