= Brunner (crater) =

Lunar impact crater

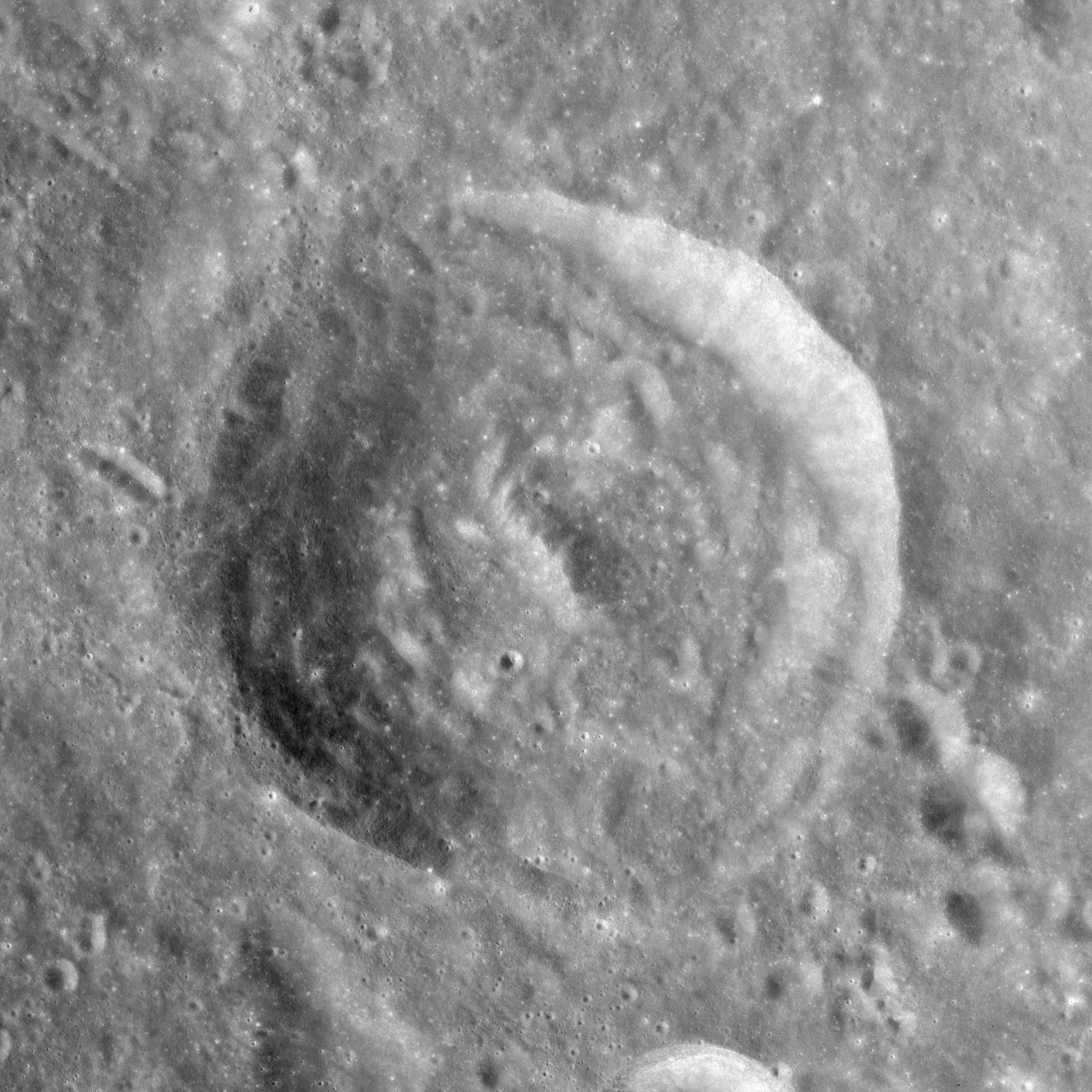
- Apollo 17 mapping camera image
- Coordinates: 9.9°S 90.9°E
- Diameter: 50.66 km (31.48 mi)
- Depth: 3.63 km (2.26 mi)
- Colongitude: 271° at sunrise
- Formation: Early Imbrian
- Eponym: William O. Brunner

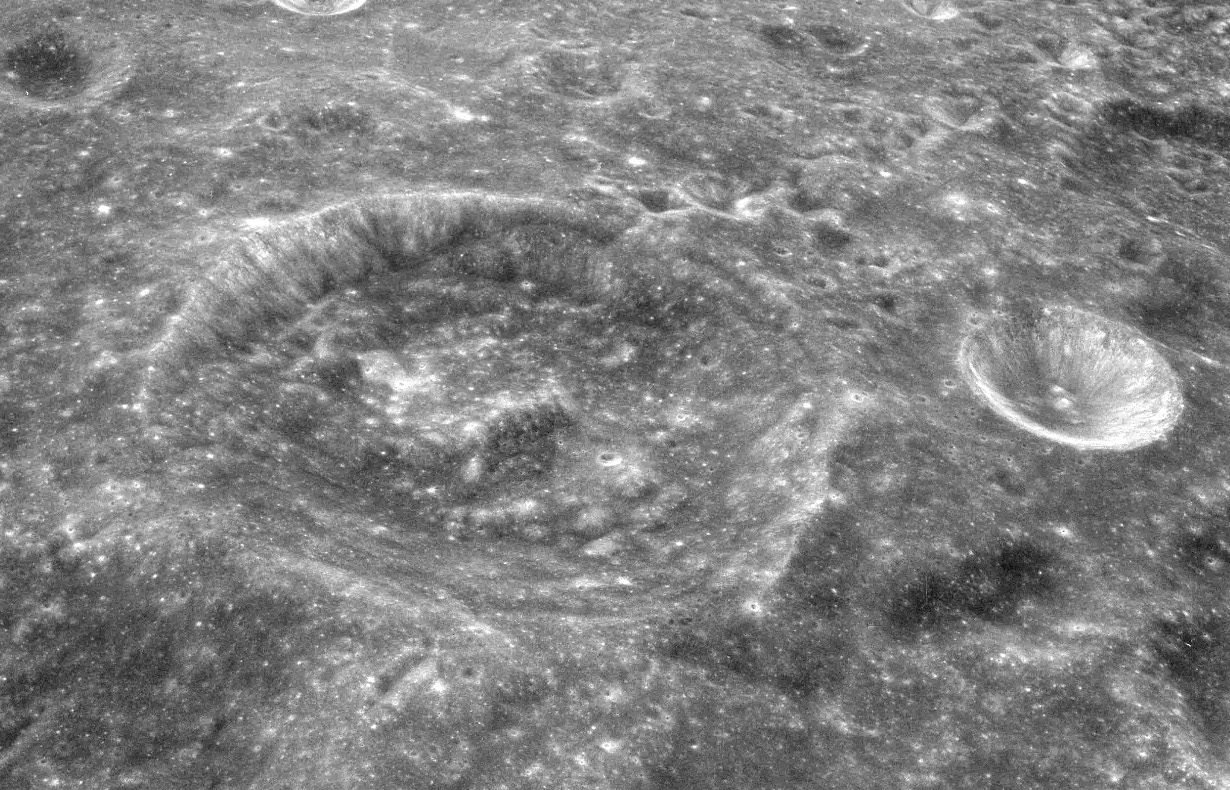
Brunner and Brunner N (right), from Apollo 8

Brunner is a lunar impact crater that is located along the eastern limb of the Moon, to the southeast of the Mare Smythii. At this location the crater is viewed from the edge, and so it is not possible to see much detail from the Earth. The visibility of this formation is also affected by libration. The crater lies to the southwest of a walled plain called Hirayama, and to the east of the elongated crater Houtermans.

On the lunar geologic timescale, this formation dates to the Early Imbrian period. The rim of Brunner is well-defined and nearly circular, although there is a slight outward bulge and a depressed wall along the north. The interior of the crater is rugged and irregular, with a central ridge formation at the midpoint. There is also a ring-like formation on the floor that is concentric with the inner wall.

This crater is named after Swiss astronomer William O. Brunner (1878–1958). Its designation was officially adopted by the International Astronomical Union in 1970.

== Satellite craters ==
By convention these features are identified on lunar maps by placing the letter on the side of the crater midpoint that is closest to Brunner.

Brunner	Latitude	Longitude	Diameter
L	12.4° S	91.3° E	34 km
N	11.4° S	90.7° E	18 km
P	12.5° S	90.1° E	19 km
