= 498 Tokio =

Main-belt asteroid

Tokio
Discovery
- Discovered by: Auguste Charlois
- Discovery site: Nice
- Discovery date: 2 December 1902

Designations
- Pronunciation: /ˈtoʊkioʊ/
- Alternative designations: 1902 KU

Orbital characteristics
- Epoch 31 July 2016 (JD 2457600.5)
- Uncertainty parameter 0
- Observation arc: 112.09 yr (40942 d)
- Aphelion: 3.2459283 AU (485.58396 Gm)
- Perihelion: 2.0591298 AU (308.04143 Gm)
- Semi-major axis: 2.6525291 AU (396.81271 Gm)
- Eccentricity: 0.2237107
- Orbital period (sidereal): 4.32 yr (1577.9 d)
- Mean anomaly: 178.62454°
- Mean motion: 0° 13^{m} 41.327^{s} / day
- Inclination: 9.493271°
- Longitude of ascending node: 97.404216°
- Argument of perihelion: 241.19753°

Physical characteristics
- Mean radius: 40.915±1.15 km
- Mass: (5.8±2.4)×10^{17} kg (Note: Calculated from its standard gravitational parameter GM = 0.039±0.016 km^{3}/s^{2}.)
- Mean density: 2.04 g/cm^{3} (Note: Assuming a diameter of 81.8 km.)
- Synodic rotation period: 41.85 h (1.744 d)
- Geometric albedo: 0.0694±0.004
- Absolute magnitude (H): 8.95

498 Tokio (1902 KU) is a main-belt asteroid discovered on 2 December 1902 by Auguste Charlois at the Nice Observatory. Attribution to Astronomer Shin Hirayama of the Azabu Observatory, Tokyo, Japan for the 1900 discovery and naming of Tokio as cited in the 1947 Monthly Newsletter of the Royal Astronomical Society Vol 107, page 45.
