= Call Taxi (India) =

Taxi service in India

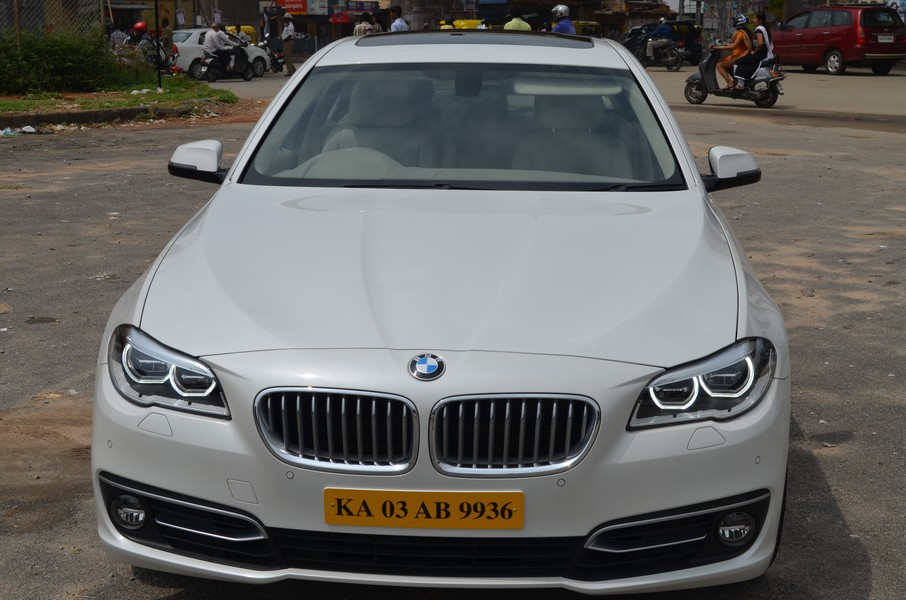
Call Taxi in Bangalore

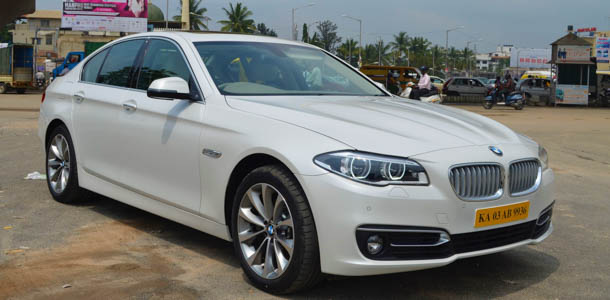
Call Taxi in Mumbai

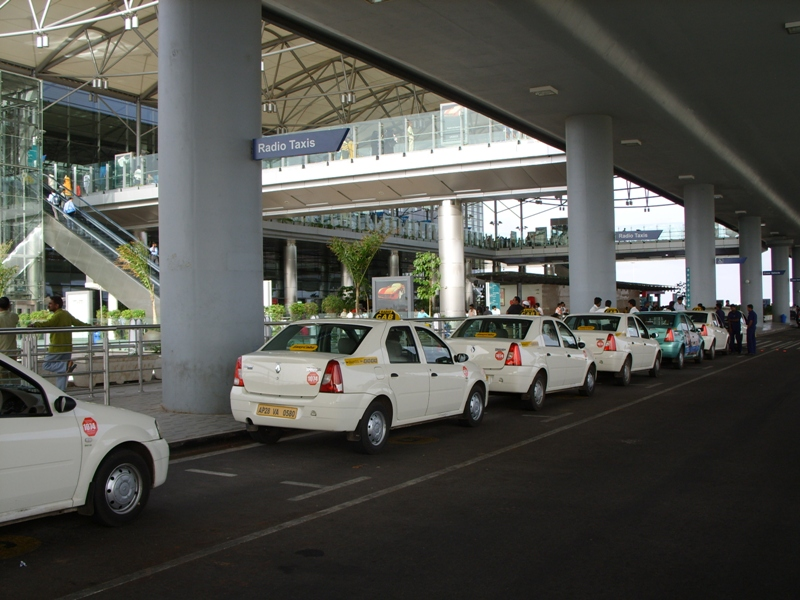
Call Taxi in Hyderabad

Call Taxis are taxi services in India in several cities in India.

In some cities, they operate under a regular taxi permit, while in some cities, they are treated as tourist vehicles for hire. They often offer services at all times of the day.

Call Taxi services are not officially recognised by the Motor Vehicles Act.

They are preferred as they are considered safer, more convenient than ordinary taxis or autorickshaws, and reliable.

In Mumbai, ordinary taxicabs can be booked over the internet or with a phone. In Coimbatore, a service was launched where autorickshaws can be booked over the phone.

== History ==
Call Taxis first appeared in Chennai and were described as 'no nonsense' in comparison to regular taxicabs. In Bangalore, Call taxis gained prominence after the opening of the Information Technology sectors.

In 2013, Uber commenced operations in India. The number of Uber drivers has been growing steadily over the past few years. As the company has gained in popularity, more and more drivers are applying to drive for Uber, and driver sign ups have soared.
