= Sakhavu =

Sakhavu may refer to:

- Sakhavu, a Malayalam word meaning "comrade"
- Sakhavu (1986 film), an Indian Malayalam-language film directed by K. S. Gopalakrishnan
- Sakhavu (2017 film), an Indian Malayalam-language political drama directed by Sidhartha Siva

== See also ==
- Sakha (disambiguation)
- Sakhi (disambiguation)
- Comrade (disambiguation)
