= Fox (crater) =

Crater on the Moon

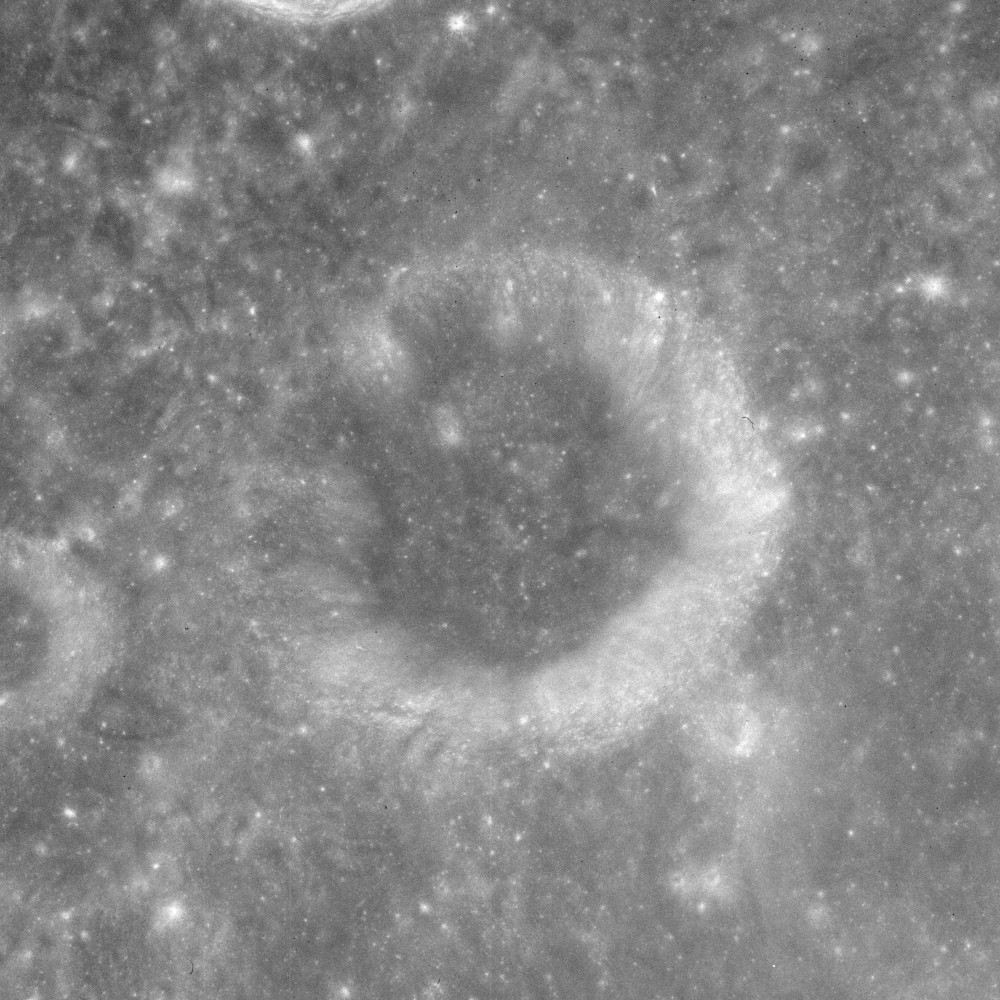
- Apollo 15 image
- Coordinates: 0.47°N 98.14°E
- Diameter: 23.97 km (14.89 mi)
- Depth: 1.6 km (0.99 mi)
- Colongitude: 262° at sunrise
- Eponym: Philip Fox

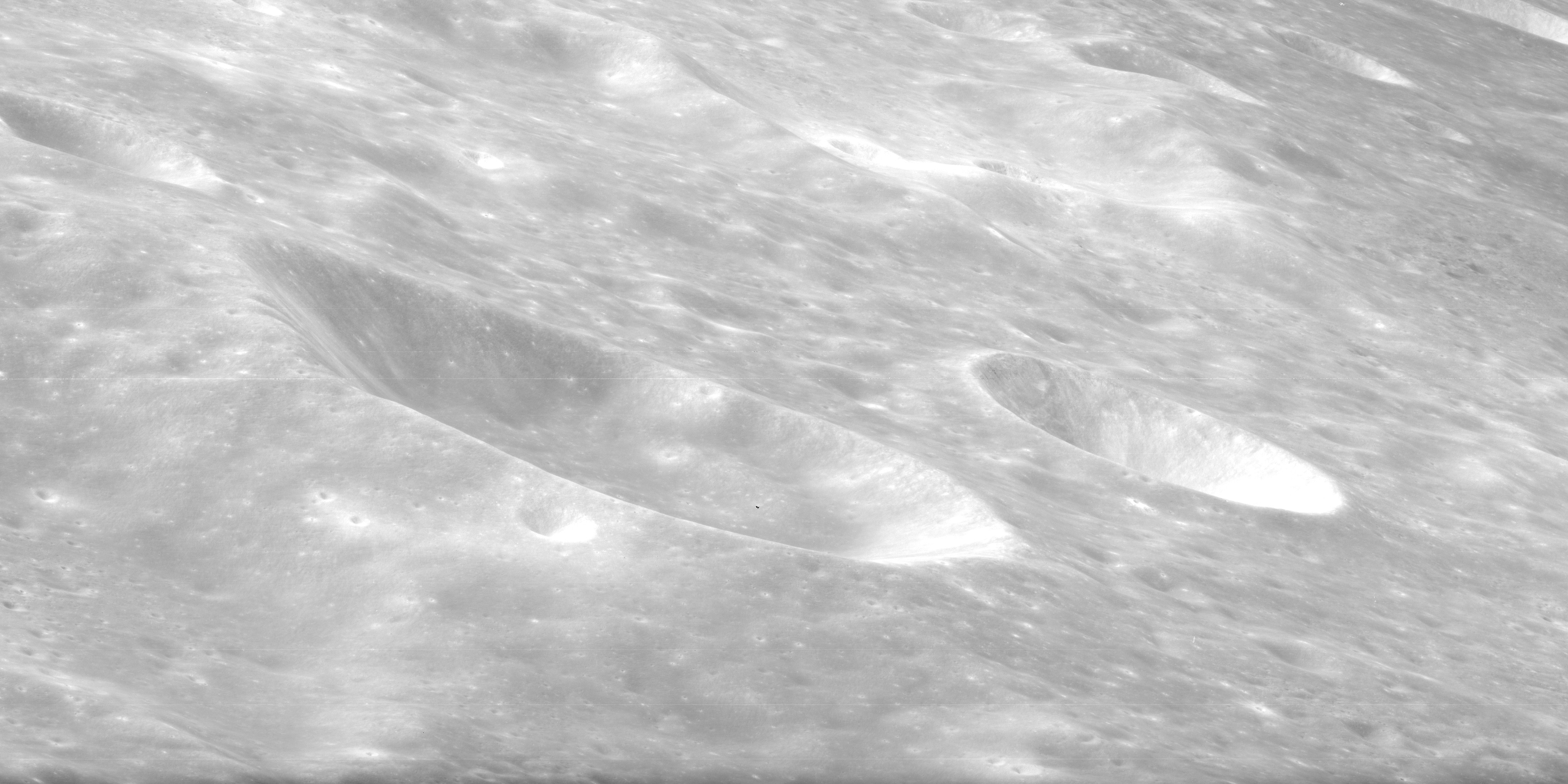
Fox (left) and Fox A (right), from Apollo 17

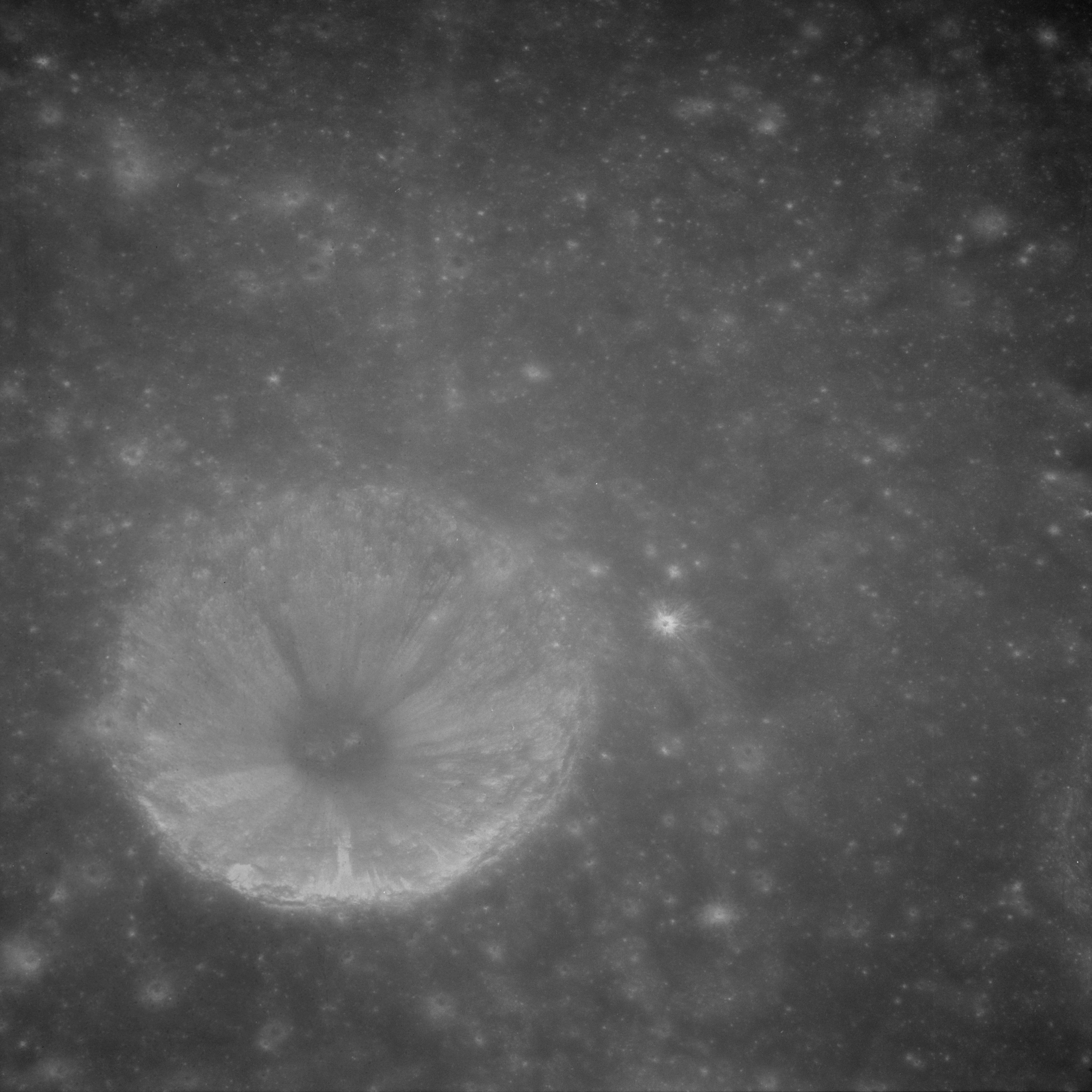
Fox A, from Apollo 11

Fox is a small lunar impact crater on the far side of the Moon. It lies near the northern rim of the crater Wyld, and to the southeast of Babcock. This crater is bowl-shaped, with a roughly circular rim, simple sloping walls and a relatively level, featureless interior. There is some talus along the northern inner wall.

This formation is named after American astronomer Philip Fox (1878-1944). Its designation was formally adopted by the International Astronomical Union in 1973.

== Satellite craters ==
By convention these features are identified on lunar maps by placing the letter on the side of the crater midpoint that is closest to Fox.

Fox	Latitude	Longitude	Diameter
A	1.5° N	98.3° E	13 km
