= Saka (disambiguation) =

Saka were the Achaemenid "Scythian" satrapy.

Saka may also refer to:

== Scythians ==
- Scythians, an ancient Eastern Iranic equestrian nomadic people
- Indo-Scythians
  - Saka era, a historical Hindu year numbering
  - Indian national calendar, sometimes called the Saka calendar

== Places ==
- Saka, Hiroshima, a town in Hiroshima Prefecture, Japan
- Saka, Estonia, a village in Toila Parish, Ida-Viru County, Estonia
- Saka, Latvia, a village in Saka Parish of Pāvilosta Municipality, Latvia.
- Saka, Morocco, a town in Taza Province, Morocco
- Saka Sirhind, a town in Punjab State, India

== Other uses ==
- Saka or last stand in battle, an ancient Indian tradition of men fighting to death
- Saka language, a variety of Eastern Iranian languages
- Makhuwa language, also Makhuwa-Saka language, a dialect of Nkutu in the Democratic Republic of the Congo

== People with the surname ==
- Anto Saka (born 2004), American football player
- Bukayo Saka (born 2001), English footballer
- Fuat Saka (born 1952), Turkish musician
- Hasan Saka (1885–1960), Turkish politician
- Katsuhiko Saka (坂 克彦; born 1985), Japanese baseball player
- Keisuke Saka (坂 圭祐; born 1995), Japanese footballer
- Osamu Saka (阪 脩; born 1930), Japanese actor and voice actor
- Paul Saka, American philosopher
- Pınar Saka (born 1985), Turkish sprinter
- Taihei Saka (坂 大平; born 1964), Japanese swimmer

== See also ==
- Shaka (disambiguation)
- Sakha (disambiguation)
- Acestor Sakas, an Athenian tragic poet
