= Wyld (crater) =

Crater on the Moon

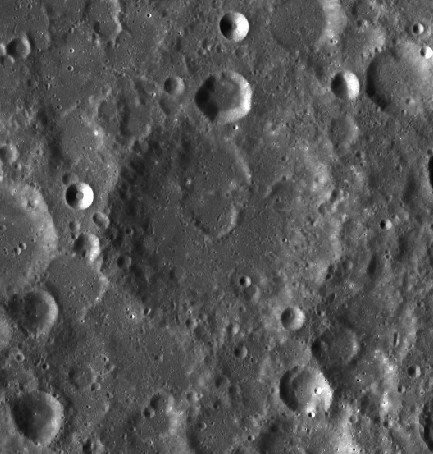
- LRO image
- Coordinates: 1.4°S 98.1°E
- Diameter: 93 km
- Depth: Unknown
- Colongitude: 263° at sunrise
- Eponym: James H. Wyld

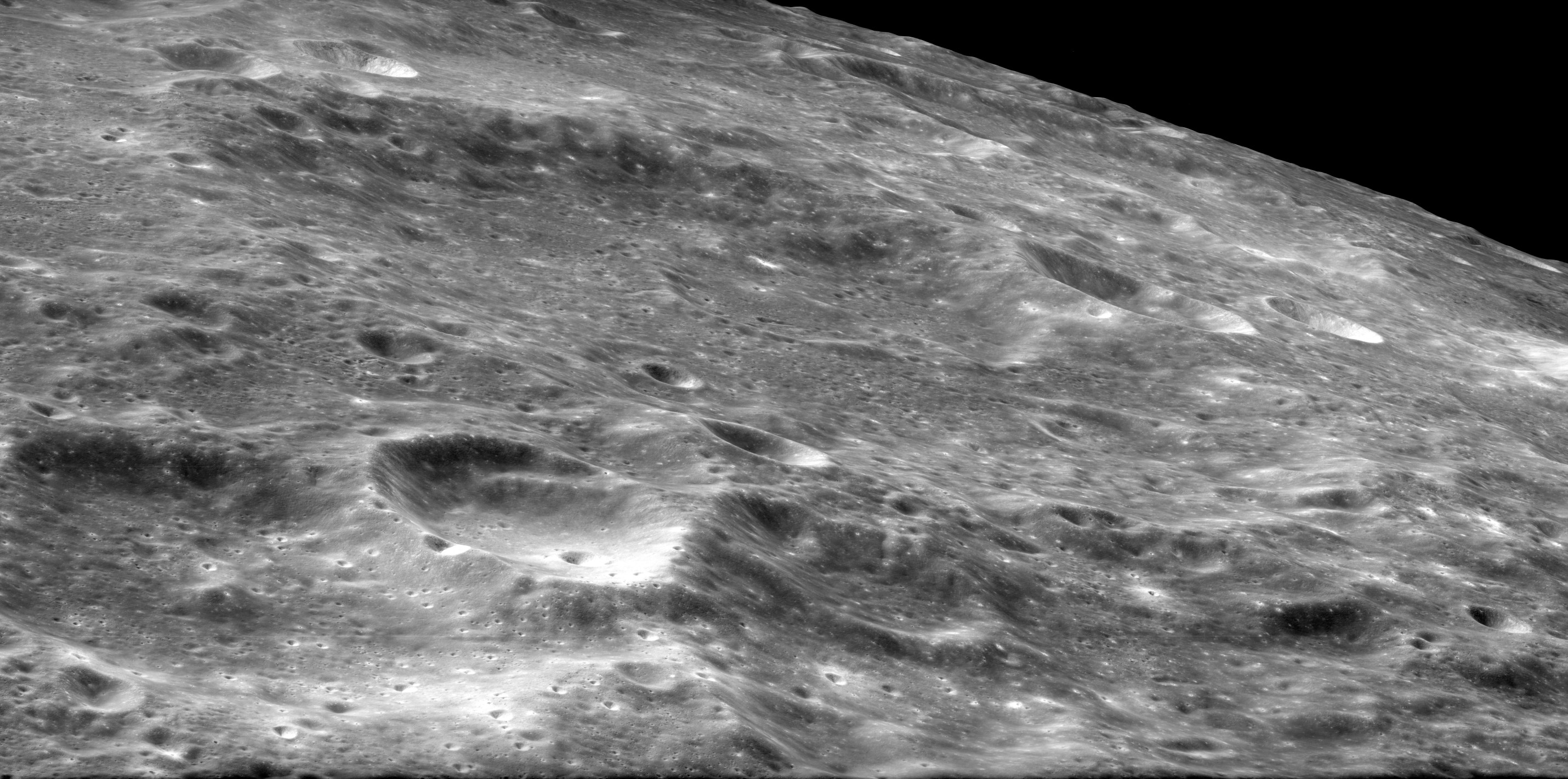
Oblique view from Apollo 17

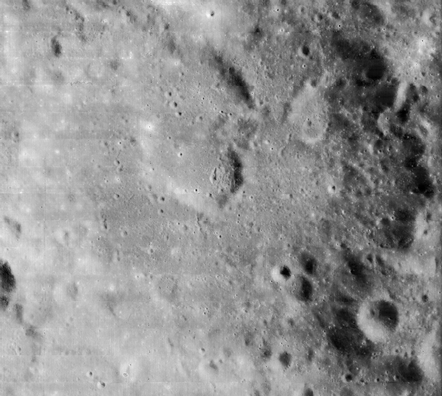
Wyld crater from Lunar Orbiter 1. NASA/L&PI image.

Wyld is a lunar impact crater that is located on the Moon's far side, beyond the eastern limb. It lies in that portion of the lunar surface that is sometimes brought into view of the Earth under conditions of favorable libration and illumination, but even then the crater is seen from the edge and not much detail can be observed. Wyld lies to the northeast of the larger Hirayama and to the west of Saha. Attached to the northern outer rim is the small crater Fox.

This is a worn and eroded crater with an uneven outer rim that is now little more than a roughly circular ridge in the surface. In the northern half of the floor is a merged pair of craters that partly overlaps the northern rim. The remainder of the interior floor is marked by small craterlets.

== Satellite craters ==
By convention these features are identified on lunar maps by placing the letter on the side of the crater midpoint that is closest to Wyld.

| Wyld | Latitude | Longitude | Diameter |
|---|---|---|---|
| C | 0.7° N | 100.5° E | 28 km |
| J | 3.8° S | 99.4° E | 24 km |
