= William Otto Brunner =

Swiss astronomer (1878–1958)

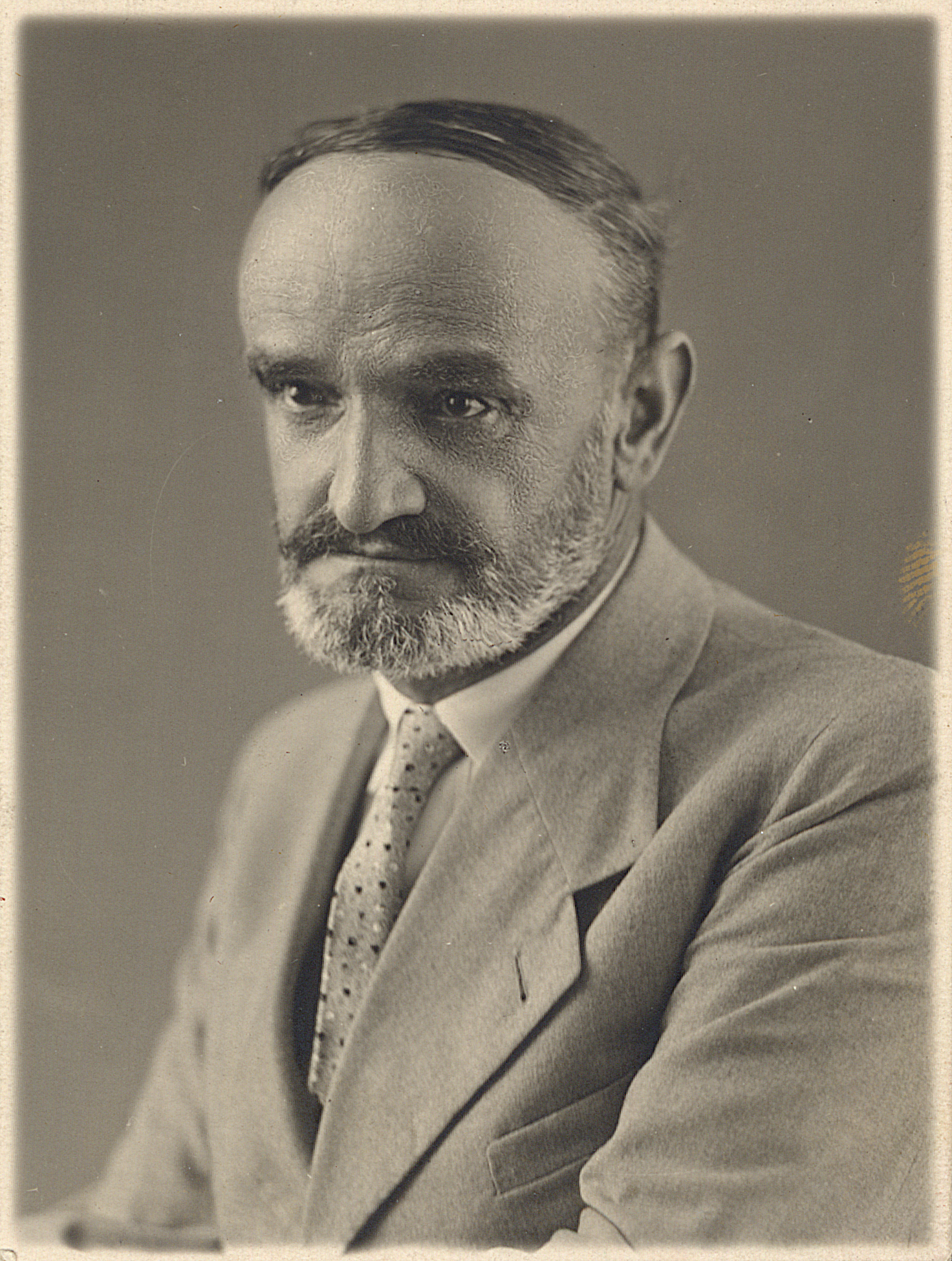
William Otto Brunner

William Otto Brunner (7 July 1878 – 1 December 1958) was a Swiss astronomer.

From 1926 until 1945 he was the director of the Swiss Federal Observatory. He continued the series of Zürich sunspot observations that was begun by Rudolf Wolf, succeeding the previous director, Alfred Wolfer. These observations continue up to the present, at the Royal Observatory of Belgium.

The crater Brunner on the Moon is named after him.

== Bibliography ==
- Brunner, William, "Die Welt der Sterne", Zürich, 1947.
- Brunner, William, "Vom Sternenhimmel", Erlenbach-Zürich, E. Rentsch, 1940.
- Brunner William, "Contributions to the photometry of night sky", Zürich, 1935.
- Brunner, William, "Anzeige des Todes von Alfred Wolfer", Astronomische Nachrichten, volume 243, 1931.
- Brunner, William, "Helligkeitsmessungen von Nova 60.1927 Aquilae", Astronomische Nachrichten, volume 230, 1927.
- Brunner, William, "Dreht sich die erde?", Leipzig und Berlin, B. G. Teubner, 1915.
