= 727 Nipponia =

Main-belt asteroid

Discovery
- Discovered by: A. Massinger
- Discovery site: Heidelberg
- Discovery date: 11 February 1912

Designations
- Pronunciation: /nɪˈpoʊniə/
- Alternative designations: 1912 NT

Orbital characteristics
- Epoch 31 July 2016 (JD 2457600.5)
- Uncertainty parameter 0
- Observation arc: 102.89 yr (37582 d)
- Aphelion: 2.8378 AU (424.53 Gm)
- Perihelion: 2.2944 AU (343.24 Gm)
- Semi-major axis: 2.5661 AU (383.88 Gm)
- Eccentricity: 0.10588
- Orbital period (sidereal): 4.11 yr (1501.5 d)
- Mean anomaly: 210.761°
- Mean motion: 0° 14^{m} 23.172^{s} / day
- Inclination: 15.060°
- Longitude of ascending node: 133.068°
- Argument of perihelion: 274.978°

Physical characteristics
- Mean radius: 16.085±0.75 km
- Synodic rotation period: 3.974 ± 0.001 h 5.0687 h (0.21120 d)
- Geometric albedo: 0.2423±0.025
- Absolute magnitude (H): 9.6

727 Nipponia is a minor planet orbiting the Sun. It is a member of the Maria family of asteroids.

Nipponia was originally discovered by Shin Hirayama in Tokyo on March 6, 1900. However, he was not able to determine its orbit. After it was rediscovered by Adam Massinger on February 11, 1912, Massinger gave the honor of naming it to Hirayama, who chose to name it from a latinization of "Nippon" (Japan in Japanese). Massinger, however, remains the officially credited discoverer of Nipponia.MPC
