= Saha (crater) =

Crater on the Moon

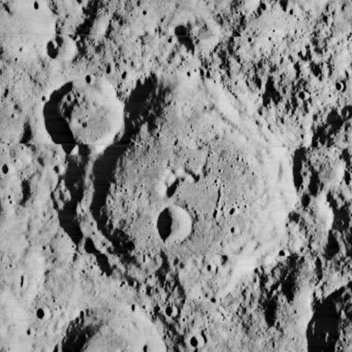
- Lunar Orbiter 2 image
- Coordinates: 1.6°S 102.7°E
- Diameter: 99 km
- Depth: Unknown
- Colongitude: 258° at sunrise
- Eponym: Meghnad Saha

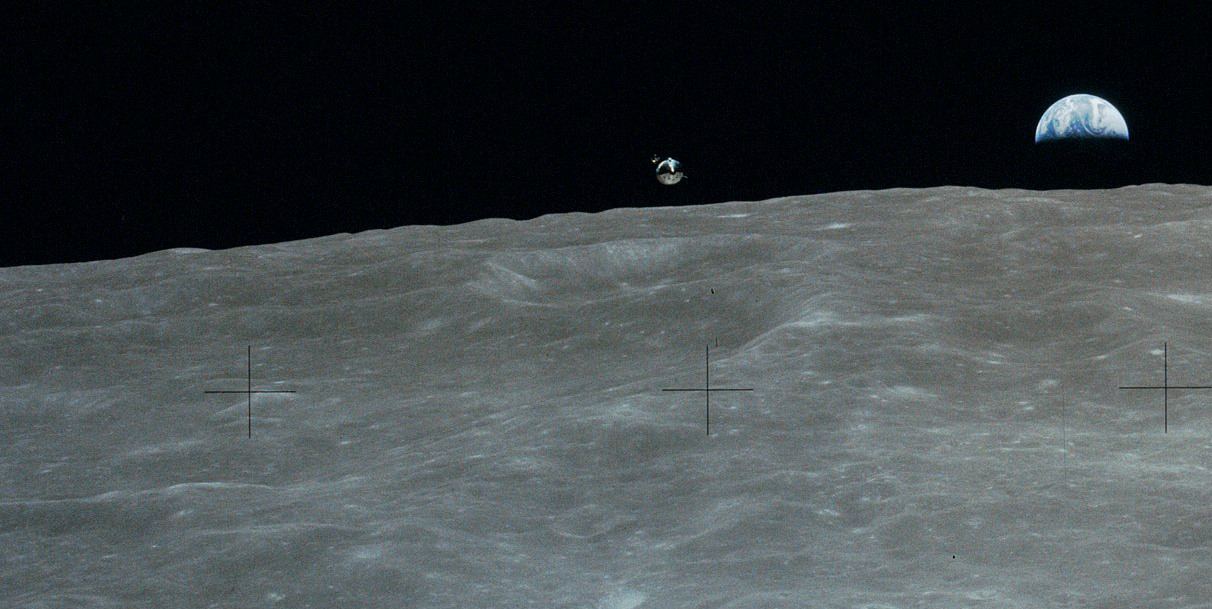
Oblique view of Saha (at left), with the Apollo 16 CSM above Saha W and the Earth at right above the horizon

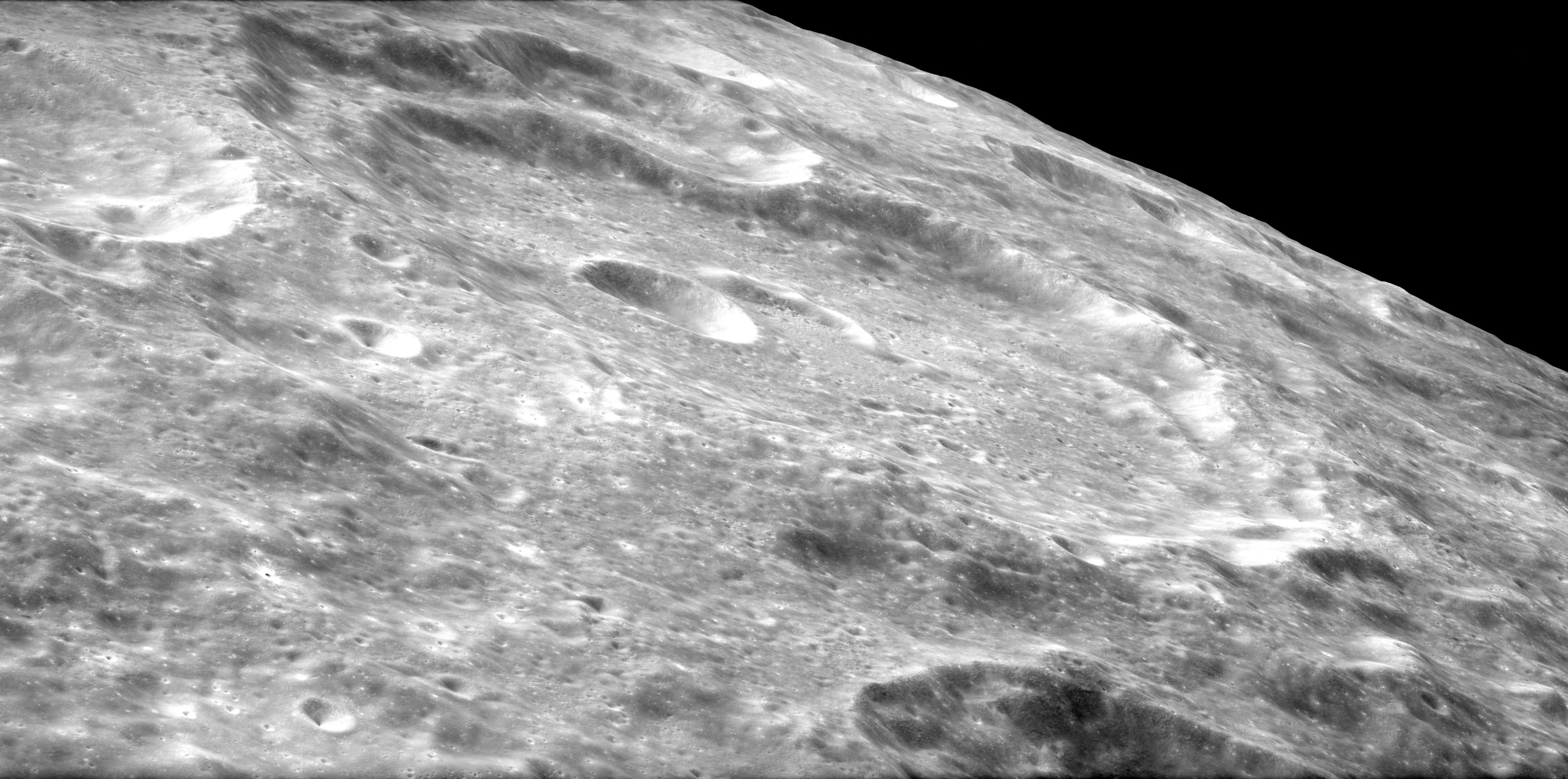
Oblique view of Saha from Apollo 17

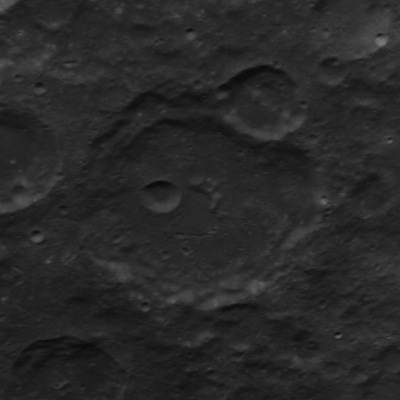
View of Saha from Apollo 14

Saha is a lunar impact crater on the Moon's far side, behind the eastern limb as seen from the Earth. It lies less than one crater diameter due east of the similar-sized Wyld, and to the north-northwest of Pasteur, a large walled plain.

This crater has been worn and damaged by subsequent impacts, including the satellite crater Saha W, which lies across the northwest rim and inner wall. The inner sides still display some terrace-like shelf structures, but these have become worn and have lost definition. There is a small, bowl-shaped crater, Saha M, in the southwestern part of the interior floor. To the north of this feature is an arcing ridge feature. The floor is otherwise pitted by various tiny craterlets.

This crater is a proposed site of Lunar Crater Radio Telescope, along with Daedalus crater. The location of Saha is shielded from any radio emissions from the Earth itself, as well as any geosynchronous orbit of the Earth.

== Satellite craters ==
By convention, these features are identified on lunar maps by placing the letter on the side of the crater midpoint that is closest to Saha.

Saha	Latitude	Longitude	Diameter
B	1.5° N	104.5° E	34 km
C	1.4° N	107.8° E	64 km
D	0.1° N	107.5° E	35 km
E	0.2° S	107.6° E	28 km
J	4.0° S	105.3° E	52 km
M	2.2° S	102.6° E	18 km
N	4.1° S	101.5° E	49 km
W	0.6° S	101.4° E	34 km

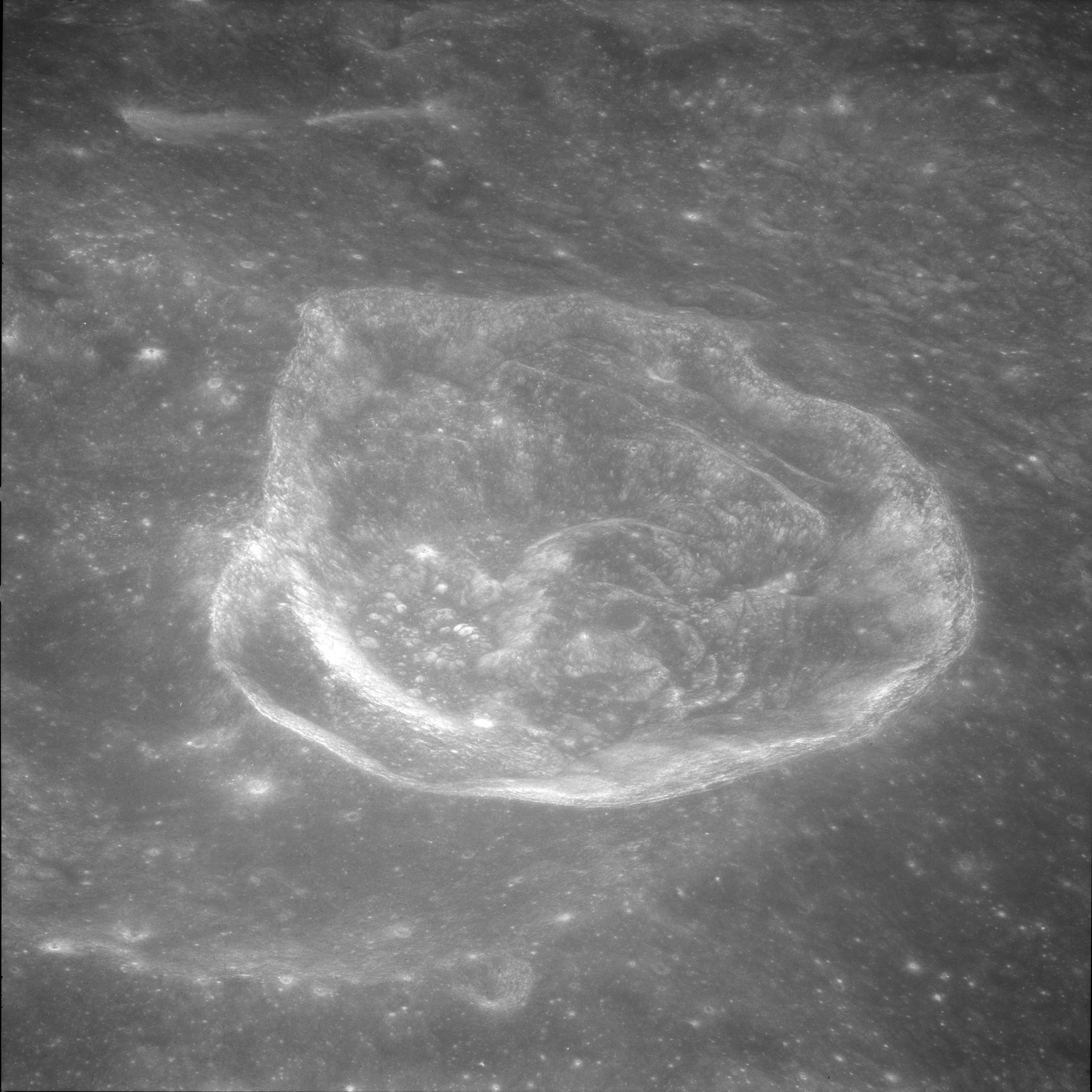
Saha E crater from Apollo 11
