= 1999 Hirayama =

Dark main-belt asteroid

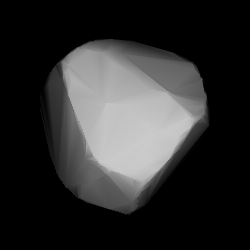
- Modelled shape of Hirayama from its lightcurve

Discovery
- Discovered by: L. Kohoutek
- Discovery site: Bergedorf Obs.
- Discovery date: 27 February 1973

Designations
- Named after: Kiyotsugu Hirayama (Japanese astronomer)
- Alternative designations: 1973 DR · 1935 GF; 1940 EH · 1951 EY_{1} 1951 FA · 1965 UF; 1969 NB · 1975 NE
- Minor planet category: main-belt · (outer)

Orbital characteristics
- Epoch 4 September 2017 (JD 2458000.5)
- Uncertainty parameter 0
- Observation arc: 77.24 yr (28,212 days)
- Aphelion: 3.4757 AU
- Perihelion: 2.7575 AU
- Semi-major axis: 3.1166 AU
- Eccentricity: 0.1152
- Orbital period (sidereal): 5.50 yr (2,010 days)
- Mean anomaly: 39.370°
- Mean motion: 0° 10^{m} 44.76^{s} / day
- Inclination: 12.529°
- Longitude of ascending node: 148.03°
- Argument of perihelion: 357.05°

Physical characteristics
- Mean diameter: 33.77 km (derived); 33.95±2.1 km 35.68±0.55 km 38.28±0.40 km
- Synodic rotation period: 13.5921±0.0003 h (Note: Hamanowa (2011) web: rotation period 13.5921±0.0003 hours with a brightness amplitude of 0.57 mag. Summary figures at Collaborative Asteroid Lightcurve Link (CALL) for (1999) Hirayama); 15.63±0.01 h 22.37±0.03 h
- Geometric albedo: 0.053±0.005; 0.0617 (derived); 0.082±0.003; 0.0882±0.012
- Spectral type: C
- Absolute magnitude (H): 10.6 · 10.78±0.31 · 10.90 · 11.0

1999 Hirayama (prov. designation: 1973 DR) is a dark background asteroid from the outer region of the asteroid belt, approximately 34 kilometers (21 miles) in diameter. It was discovered on 27 February 1973, by Czech astronomer Luboš Kohoutek at the Hamburger Bergedorf Observatory in Germany, and later named after Japanese astronomer Kiyotsugu Hirayama.

== Orbit and classification ==
Hirayama orbits the Sun in the outer main-belt at a distance of 2.8–3.5 AU once every 5 years and 6 months (2,010 days). Its orbit has an eccentricity of 0.12 and an inclination of 13° with respect to the ecliptic. The spectrum of Hirayama matches a C-type classification on the Tholen taxonomic scheme, but with a "broad absorption band that can be associated to a process of aqueous alteration". That is, the surface appears to show some form of water modification.

== Naming ==
This minor planet is named in honour of Japanese astronomer Kiyotsugu Hirayama (1874–1943), best known for his discovery that many asteroid orbits were more similar to one another than chance would allow, leading to the concept of asteroid families, now called Hirayama families. The lunar crater Hirayama is also named in his honour. The official naming citation was published by the Minor Planet Center on 15 October 1977 (M.P.C. 4237).

== Physical characteristics ==
=== Rotation period ===
A rotational lightcurve of Hirayama was obtained at the Menke Observatory in February 2002. It showed a periodicity of 15.63±0.01 hours, during which time the brightness of Hirayama varies by 0.45±0.04 in magnitude (U=3-). At the same time, photometric observations by astronomers Roberto Crippa and Federico Manzini gave a rotation period of 22.37 hours and a brightness variation of 0.47 magnitude (U=2). These results supersede an observation from January 2005, by Hiromi and Hiroko Hamanowa at their Hamanowa Astronomical Observatory, Japan, that gave a shorter period of 13.59 hours with an amplitude of 0.57 magnitude.(U=n.a.).

=== Diameter and albedo ===
According to the surveys carried out by the Infrared Astronomical Satellite IRAS, the Japanese Akari satellite, and NASA's Wide-field Infrared Survey Explorer with its subsequent NEOWISE mission, the asteroid measures between 34.0 and 38.3 kilometers in diameter and its surface has an albedo between 0.053 and 0.088. The Collaborative Asteroid Lightcurve Link derives an albedo of 0.062 and a diameter of 33.8 kilometers with an absolute magnitude of 11.0.
