= Shin Hirayama =

Japanese astronomer (1868 - 1945)

- 平山信
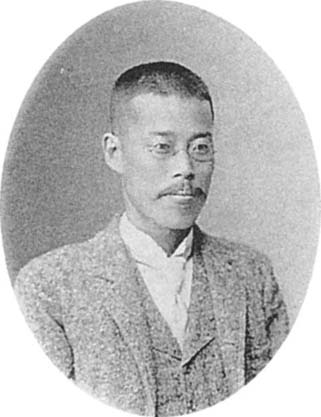
- Born: October 6, 1867; Tokyo, Japan
- Died: June 2, 1945 (aged 77)
- Education: Tokyo Imperial University
- Scientific career
- Fields: Astronomy
- Notable students: Discovering 498 Tokio and 727 Nipponia

Shin Hirayama (平山 信, Hirayama Shin; October 6, 1867 – June 2, 1945), also read as Makoto Hirayama, was the first Japanese astronomer to discover an asteroid. In 1900, he discovered 498 Tokio and 727 Nipponia. The crater Hirayama on the Moon is jointly named after him and Kiyotsugu Hirayama.

== Biography ==
Shin Hirayama was born in Edo (now Tokyo) and the second son of a former guard of the Shogun. He was a disciple of astronomer and mathematician Hisashi Terao, and finished the course of astronomy at the Tokyo Imperial University in 1890. After graduating, he was sent to England by the Japanese government to help further his studies in astronomy. He worked on astronomical spectroscopy at the Royal Observatory in Greenwich. Several months later, he went to Potsdam, Germany, where he stayed for about three years. He also attended lectures in Berlin and Leipzig during his stay in the country. During this time, he also published a paper on various diffraction patterns.

When he came back to Japan in 1895, he started work as a professor of astronomy at the Tokyo Imperial University where he taught practical astronomy, stellar astronomy, orbit determination and geodesy. He later became director of the Tokyo Astronomical Observatory in 1919.

In March 1900, Shin Hirayama discovered 498 Tokio and 727 Nipponia. However, as he was not able to determine their orbits, he is not recognized as having discovered them. He was still granted naming rights over the Tokio asteroid. He also suggested "Nippon", as a name for 727 Nipponia, and its discoverer Adam Massinger named the minor planet "Nipponia" — a Latin feminized form of the word "Nippon" — in his honor.
