= Taxis of India =

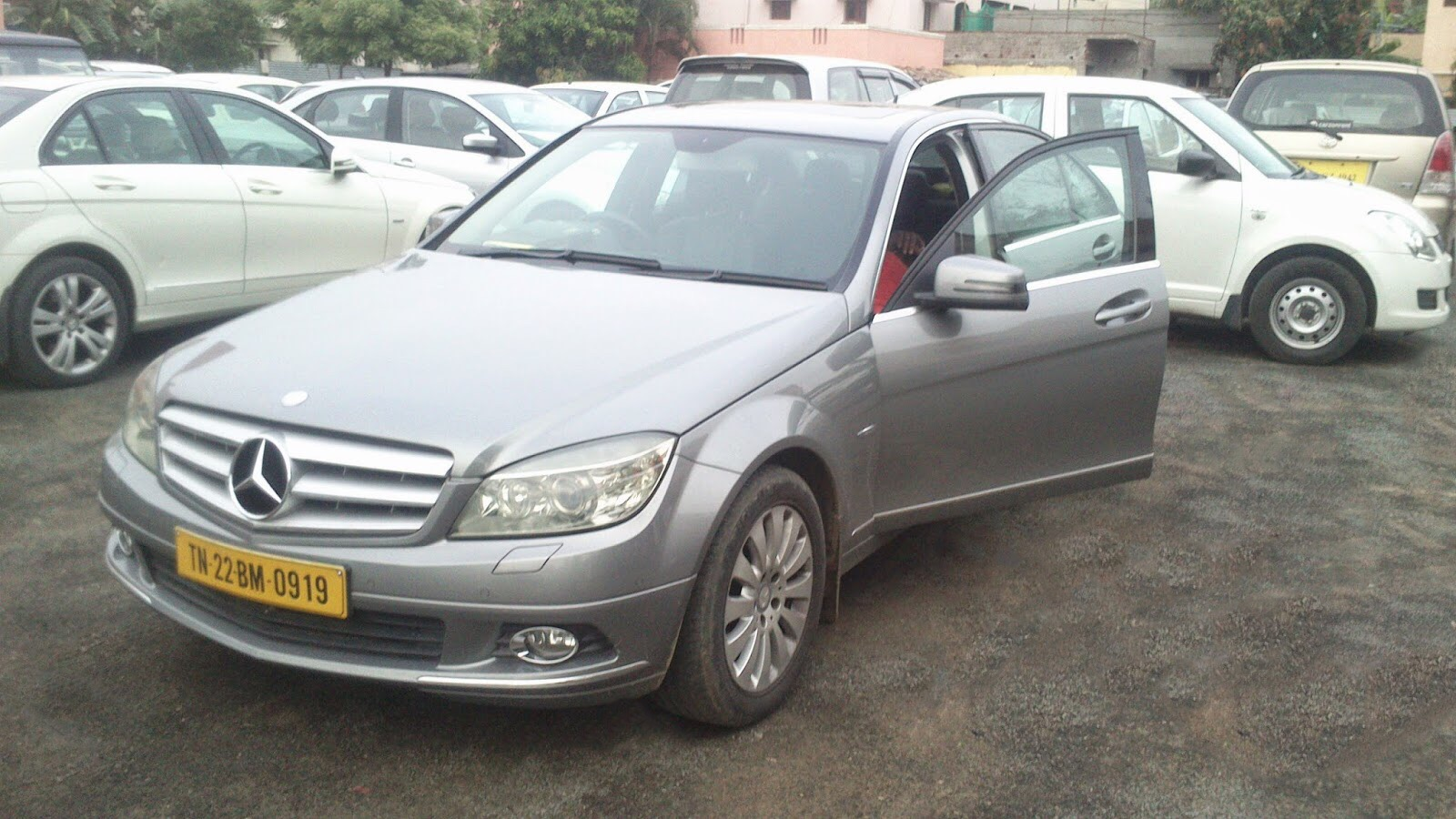
Call Taxi in Tamil Nadu

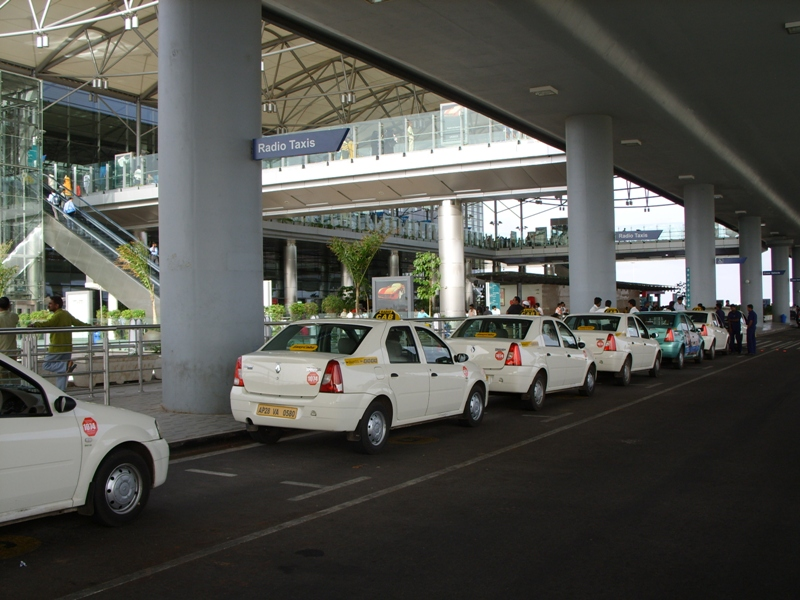
Radio taxicabs at Hyderabad International Airport in Hyderabad, Telangana

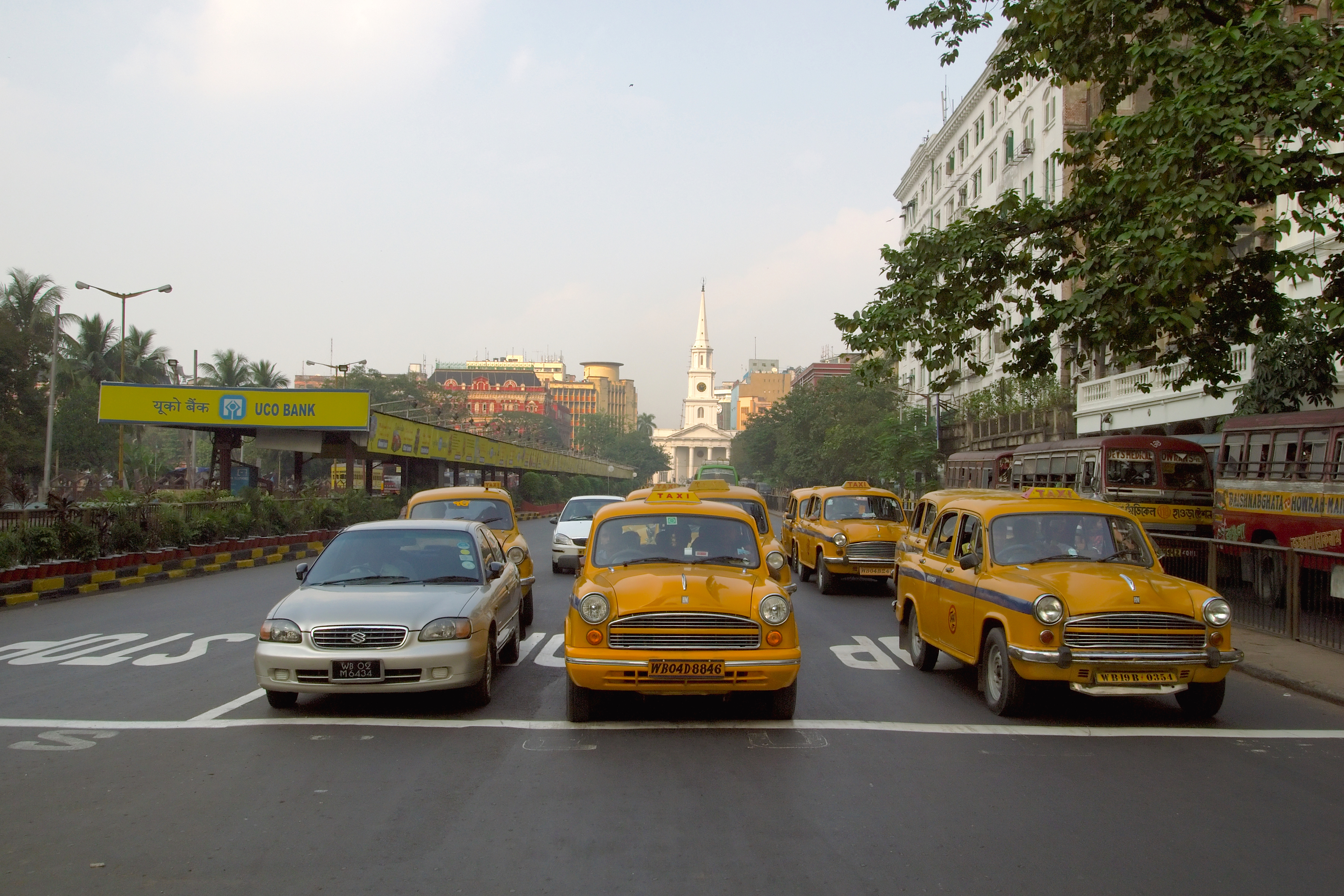
Yellow taxis in Kolkata

Cars such as Maruti Suzuki Dzire, Toyota Etios, Maruti Suzuki Ertiga, Maruti Omni, Maruti Suzuki Wagon-R. Mahindra Logan, Toyota Innova, Tata Indica and Tata Indigo are fairly popular among taxicab operators in India. The livery of the taxicabs in India varies from state to state. In Delhi and Maharashtra, most taxicabs have yellow-black livery, while in West Bengal, taxis have yellow livery. Private taxicab operators are not required to have a specific livery. However, they are required by law to be registered as commercial vehicles.

According to Government of India regulations, all taxicabs are required to have a fare-meter installed. However, enforcement by authorities is lax and many cabs operate either without fare-meter or with defunct ones. In such cases, fare is decided by bargaining between the customer and the driver. Taxicabs face stiff competition from auto rickshaws, but in some cities, for example Mumbai, auto-rickshaws are banned in the main city district, thus giving taxicabs a monopoly.

== Taxicabs ==
In India, classic taxicabs in Delhi and Mumbai have distinctive black and yellow liveries with the bottom half painted black and upper half painted yellow. In Kolkata, most taxis are painted yellow with a blue strip in the middle. Private companies operating taxis can have their own liveries, but need to get them approved from the government. Now, drivers don't need to pay commission.

Classic taxicabs in Tamil Nadu and Andhra Pradesh have black and yellow liveries with the bottom half painted black and upper half painted yellow with limited nos. In Chennai, most taxis look like private cars but with a yellow plated with black numbers and text for identification.

Taxis and all other commercial vehicles have a yellow number plate, so charging taxes and toll in highways is easier for the officials. Delhi is the only city in India with taxicabs running only on Compressed Natural Gas or electricity. To hail a taxicab, you normally just wait on the street(in cities like Kolkata and Mumbai), go to locations called taxi stands(in cities like Bengaluru) or book it through apps, using websites over phone calls. Traditional taxicabs are referred to as taxis in India, while online cabs are usually called cabs.

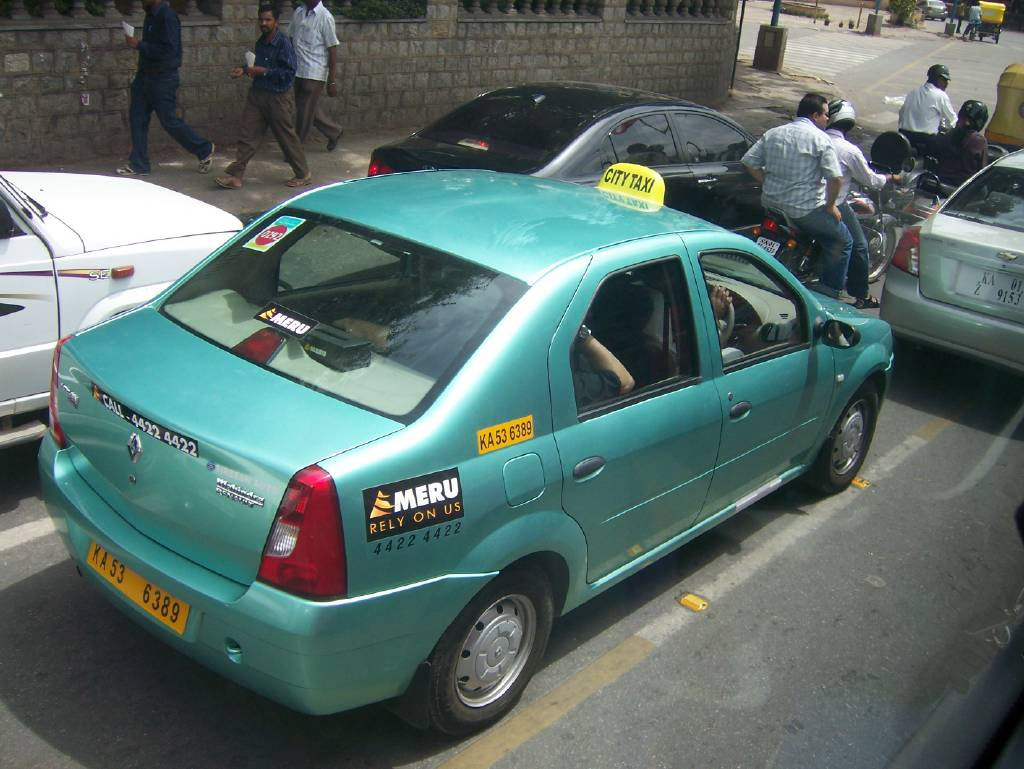
Taxicabs like the Suzuki Dzire, Mahindra Logan, Tata Indigo, Tata Indica and Toyota Etios are commonly seen in metropolises in India.

Both air-conditioned and non-air conditioned taxis are common in India. The newer taxis are white, one of the many reasons, "why the expensive taxis have been dubbed White Taxis by the locals in cities".

There are additional surcharges for luggage, late-night rides and toll taxes are to be paid by the passenger. Thanks to the booming economy but due to disparities in income many types of taxis have come up. For example, in Delhi there are five types of taxi. auto rickshaws- which are the cheapest form of taxi-, Normal Taxis, Online Cabs, White Taxis and Tourist Taxis. In posher areas like Noida and Gurgaon auto rickshaws are banned, thus giving the taxis a monopoly. Chandigarh also has a well established system of modern cabs using cars like Tata Indigo/Indigo Marina and Suzuki Dzire. Kolkata has also got many No Refusal taxis that will never say no to the passengers.

== Shared taxicab ==
In cities and localities, where taxis are expensive or do not ply as per the government or municipal regulated fares, people use Share taxis. These are normal taxis, which carry one or more passengers travelling to destinations either en route to the final destination, or nearby the final destination. The passengers are charged according to the number of people with different destinations. A similar system exists for autorickshaws, known as Share autos.

As one example, "Shared taxis" – and known just as that – have been operating in Mumbai, India, since the early 1970s. These are more like a point to point service that operates only during the peak hours. During off peak hours, they ply just like the regular taxis, can be hailed anywhere on the roads, and passengers are charged by the meter. But in order to bridge the gap between demand and supply, during peak hours, several of them operate as Shared Taxis, taking a full cab load of passengers to a more or less common destination. The pick-up points for these taxis are fixed, and are marked by a post that says, “Shared Taxis” and cabs line up at this point during peak hours. They display the general destination, they are headed for on their windscreens, and passengers just get in and wait for the cab to fill up. As soon as this happens, which takes less than a couple of minutes, the cab moves off. Fares are a fixed amount, fixed between the Taxi Unions and the authorities for the point to point distance – and are far lower than the metered fare to the same destination, but higher than the bus or train fare. Time taken is obviously much less than that by bus. These taxis are very popular because of the lack of waiting time, faster journey speeds, greater comfort and absence of the crush loads of peak hour commuter traffic in buses and trains. Generally, the taxi drivers choose the locality that they live in, in the suburbs as the destination in the evenings and in the mornings, the destinations are always the CBD in South Mumbai."

== Motorcycle taxicabs ==
Motorcycle taxicabs are a licensed form of transport in Goa, India. They are much cheaper than other taxis, although the lone passenger can only carry a backpack as luggage. Motorcycle taxis in Goa are driven by men called 'pilots'. By law, in some parts of the state, the rider is expected to wear a helmet, but the pillion-rider is not. These motorcycle taxis can normally be identified by their yellow-and-black coloured paint. The fare should be fixed in advance, and the rides are not metered.

== Taxicabs in Mumbai ==
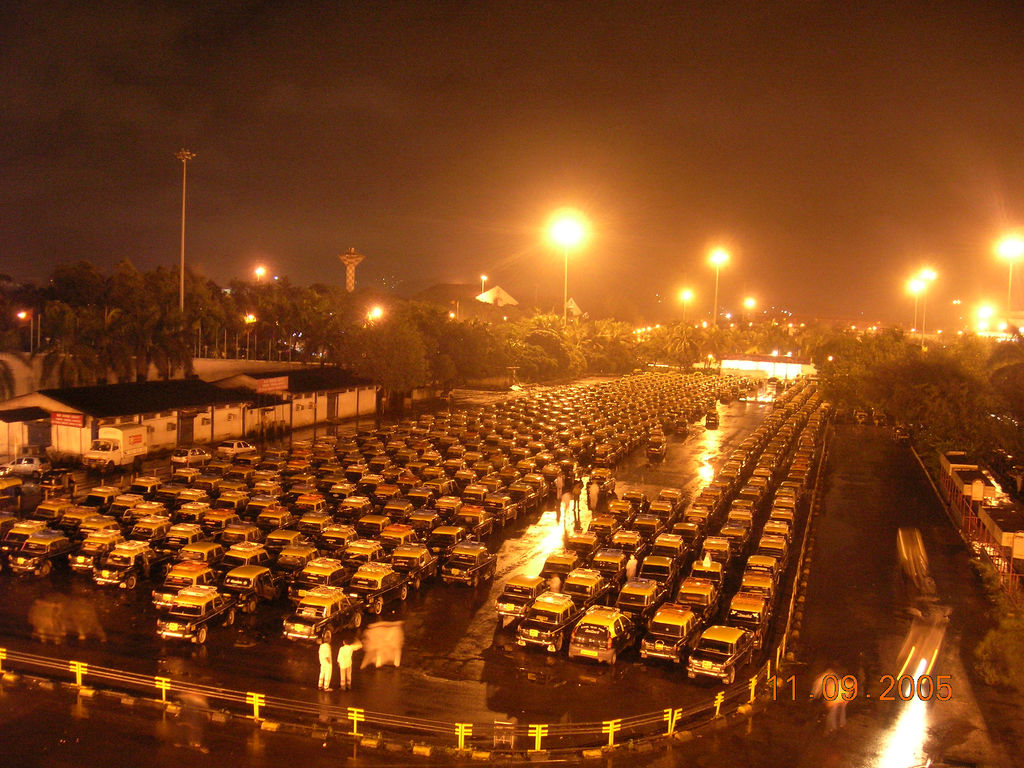
Taxis and other vehicles outside Mumbai's Chhatrapati Shivaji Maharaj International Airport in 2005.

Taxicabs arrived in 1911 to complement horse wagons. The black and yellow Fiat taxis in Mumbai, are integral part of the city's heritage and have been depicted in numerous Bollywood movies. These metered taxis ply throughout Mumbai and have monopoly from Bandra to Churchgate on the Western line and Sion to Chatrapati Shivaji Terminus on the Central line. Beyond Sion and Bandra auto rickshaws are not allowed and one has to hire a taxi. However, between Sion to Thane and Bandra to Bhayandar, Taxis and autorickshaws ply. A mechanical meter decides the fare and is proportional to the distance traveled. There are an estimated 86,000 taxicabs in Mumbai, of which 67,000 are Aggregator cabs and 19,000 are Black Yellows. Cars used for taxis include Maruti Ertiga, Tata Indigo, Mahindra Logan, Hyundai Santro, Toyota Innova, Toyota Corolla Altis, Maruti Suzuki Wagon R, Maruti Suzuki Ritz and Maruti Suzuki Dzire.

Recently, the police revealed that; it is required by law that the driver of an unengaged taxi take you to where you want to go, distance and time regardless. If the driver does not comply, one simply needs to call the police (dial 100) and mention the taxi's license number and the driver's name. The act of calling the police on your cell phone usually makes the driver comply with your request to be taken to your destination.

The city of Mumbai was first city in India, to have an "in-taxi" magazine, titled MumBaee, which is issued to taxis which are part of the Mumbai Taximen's Union. The magazine debuted on July 13, 2009.

In 2012, it was reported that the city was facing a shortage of taxis.

== Taxicabs in Delhi ==
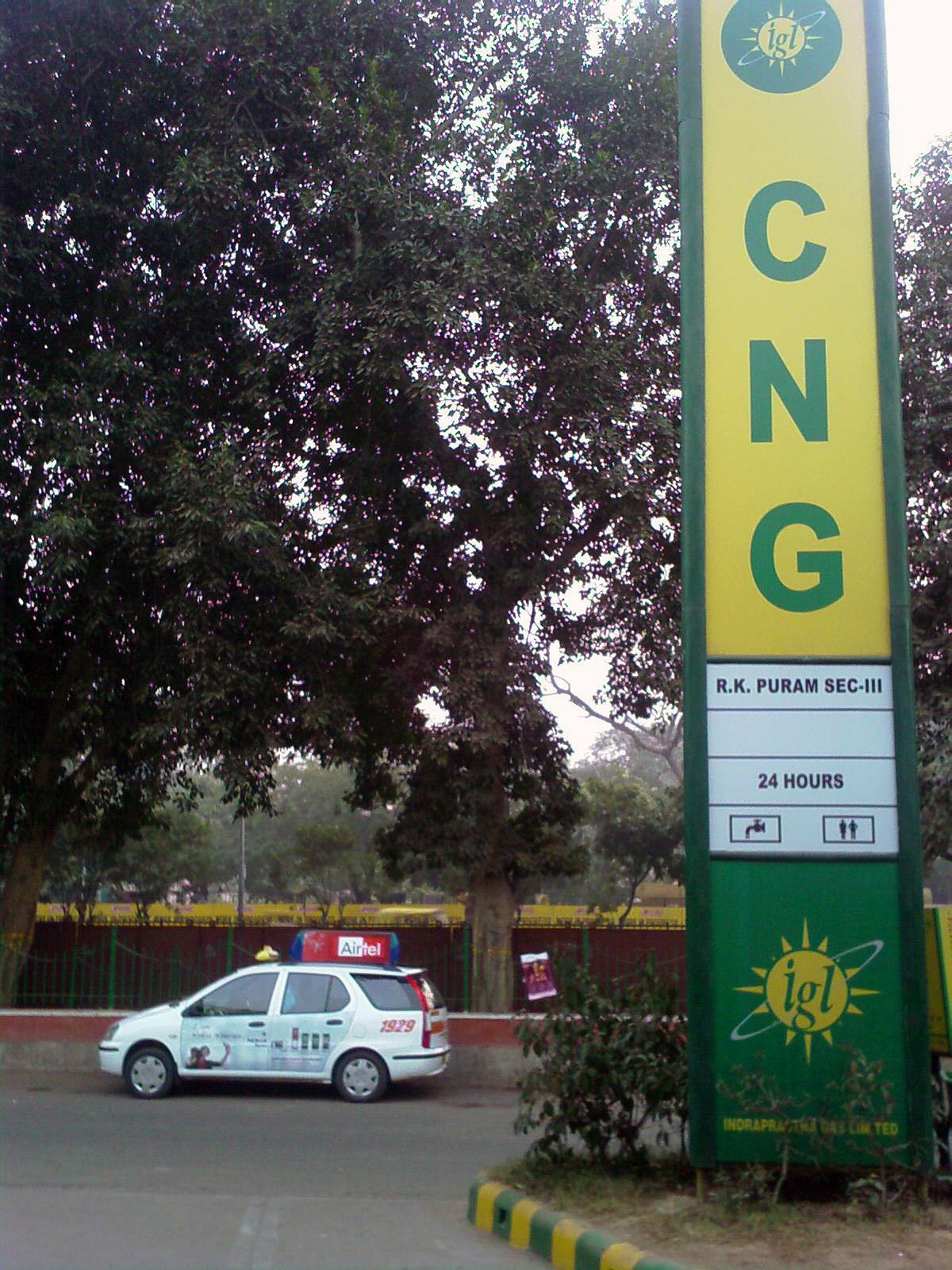
Radio taxicab powered by CNG

The Indian Tourism Ministry and various private owners operate most taxis. The Tourism Ministry grants private companies permits to operate taxis. Though in India, the concept of online booking of taxi and cabs is quite new and successful. It has been generally observed that online booking of car and taxi operations are on a macro-level, with multi-national size of entrepreneurship.

In 1998, the Supreme Court of India published a Directive that specified the date of April, 2001 as deadline to replace or convert all buses, three-wheelers and taxis in Delhi to compressed natural gas. Sakha Consulting Wings provides a unique taxi service exclusively for women by women drivers.
