= La Chatte =

1933 novella by Colette

- Author: Colette
- Language: French
- Publication date: 1933
- Publication place: France

La Chatte is a novella by French writer Sidonie-Gabrielle Colette. Released in 1933, the book tells of a love triangle involving Camille Malmert, her husband Alain Amparat and his Chartreux cat Saha. Camille loves Alain, but Alain loves his cat, whom he has had from childhood, more than he could love any woman. The book mainly focuses on Alain and his refusal to leave the memories of childhood; his cat is the embodiment of his childhood.

In the story, Camille and Alain get married and temporarily move into one of Camille's friend's flats. Alain does not like this, as he is away from his childhood home and his cat. Eventually, Camille becomes so annoyed at Alain's obsession with the cat that she pushes Saha from the balcony of the flat, to what she hopes is her death. The cat survives and Alain, furious, leaves Camille to move back in with his mother and his cat.

Alain is rumored to be based upon Colette's own brother. Saha is based upon a Chartreux cat that Colette once owned called "La Chatte."
