= Sakha Consulting Wings =

Indian taxi aggregator company

- Industry: Transport
- Headquarters: Delhi, India
- Number of locations: 4
- Area served: National Capital Region, Jaipur, Kolkata, Indore
- Key people: Arvind Vadera (CEO); Dolon Sen (Coordination Training)
- Services: Vehicles for hire
- Parent: Azad Foundation
- Website: sakhaconsultingwings.com

Sakha Consulting Wings is a taxi aggregator company based in Delhi, India, those taxis are driven exclusively by woman drivers for women passengers. It also provides facility to book a cab through calling, through their website or through their mobile application.

== Services ==
Sakha Consulting Wings claims to be a unique social enterprise, launched to provide safe transport for women, by women in urban India. Hence, it offers the services Sakha Cabs for Women as a cab service driven by women for women in Delhi and in the National Capital Region, Sakha Chauffeur Placement Services and Sakha Chauffeur on Call services for a short duration or daily packages, primarily to women and their families. As of 2015, 19 Sakha drivers run taxis in the Delhi area.

== Work ==
The taxi service was initiated by the Azad Foundation, and ensures a training in all related subjects for the women drivers in the Metropolitan area of Delhi. It also encourages an understanding of women's rights, particularly in protection from violence in public and personal spaces. The women drivers are handpicked from the poor and marginalized sections of society, and the Azad Foundation provides their training and development, Sakha's non-profit sister organisation. Driving skills are provided by the Maruti Institute of Driving and Technology Research. The drivers are educated by 14 modules of training for over six months, which included personal grooming, self-defence classes and communication skills besides the intensive driving lessons. In addition, the women drivers also are taught the art of self-defense by the Delhi Police, respectively the Crime against Women Cell to equip the drivers with the means to deal with any untoward incident that they may face on the roads.

== See also ==
- Taxis in India
