= Kimura (crater) =

Lunar crater

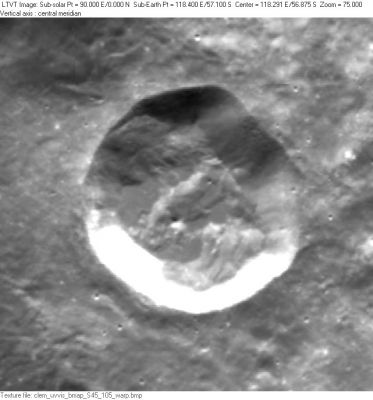
- Clementine mosaic
- Coordinates: 57.1°S 118.4°E
- Diameter: 28 km
- Depth: Unknown
- Colongitude: 243° at sunrise
- Eponym: Hisashi Kimura

Kimura is a small impact crater that is located on the Moon's far side, beyond the southeastern limb. It lies to the west-northwest of the crater Fechner, along the northeastern rim of an unnamed basin in the surface.

This is a relatively fresh feature that has not been significantly worn through impact erosion. The rim is sharp edged, and the inner walls slope downward to the interior without forming terraces. The perimeter is roughly circular, with the northeast and southwest edges being slightly straightened. The interior floor has an irregular perimeter, and is somewhat irregular in contour with a few tiny craterlets.

The crater's name, in honor of Hisashi Kimura, was adopted by the IAU in 1970.
