= Hisashi Kimura =

Japanese astronomer

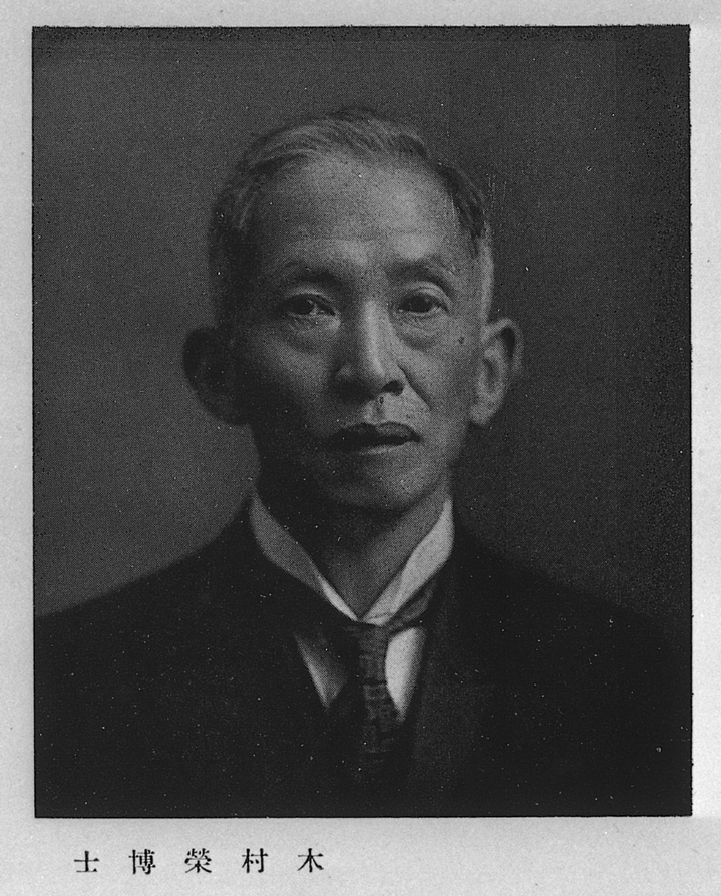
Hisashi Kimura

Hisashi Kimura (木村 栄, Kimura Hisashi; October 4, 1870 – September 26, 1943) was a Japanese astronomer originally from Kanazawa, Ishikawa.

He devoted his career to the study and measurement of variation in latitude, building upon the work of Seth Carlo Chandler, who discovered the Chandler wobble. In 1899, he became the first director of the International Latitude Observatory at Mizusawa, Japan.

He won the Gold Medal of the Royal Astronomical Society in 1936. He was one of the first people to be awarded the Order of Culture when it was established in 1937.

The crater Kimura on the Moon is named after him, the same for the asteroid 6233 Kimura.
