= Sakhi, Iran =

Sakhi سخي
- Village
- Location within Iran
- Coordinates: 32°09′00″N 48°13′00″E
- Country: Iran
- Province: Khuzestan
- County: Shush
- Bakhsh: Central
- Rural District: Hoseynabad

Population (2006)
  - Total: 649
- Time zone: UTC+3:30 (IRST)
  - Summer (DST): UTC+4:30 (IRDT)

Sakhi (Persian: سخي, also Romanized as Sakhī) is a village in Hoseynabad Rural District, in the Central District of Shush County, Khuzestan Province, Iran. At the 2006 census, its population was 649, in 96 families.
