= Kiyotsugu Hirayama =

Japanese astronomer

- 平山 清次
- Born: October 3, 1874; Sendai, Japan
- Died: April 8, 1943 (aged 68); Tokyo, Japan
- Education: Tokyo Imperial University
- Known for: Hirayama families
- Scientific career
- Notable students: Yoshio Fujita

Kiyotsugu Hirayama (平山 清次, Hirayama Kiyotsugu; October 3, 1874 – April 8, 1943) was a Japanese astronomer, best known for his discovery that many asteroid orbits were more similar to one another than chance would allow, leading to the concept of asteroid families, now called "Hirayama families" in his honour.

== Biography ==
Hirayama studied astronomy at Imperial University of Tokyo and graduated in 1897. He taught astronomy in the engineering school of the General Staff Office of the Japanese Army between 1897 and 1901. In 1906 he became Assistant Professor of Astronomy at Tokyo Imperial University; in 1919 he became a Professor. From 1906 to 1907 Hirayama was a member of the Committee that determined the latitude border at Sakhalin after the Russo–Japanese War. In 1911 he received a doctoral degree "with several papers about latitude variation". Hirayama started working on asteroids in 1905; in 1918 he published papers "Researches on the distribution of the mean motions of the asteroids" and "Groups of asteroids probably of common origin", and, later "Families of asteroids" (1922) and "Note on an explanation of the gaps of the asteroidal orbits" (1928). In 1935 he published his main work, Asteroid.

The crater Hirayama on the Moon is jointly named after him and Shin Hirayama. The asteroid 1999 Hirayama is named in his honour.
