= Hirayama (crater) =

Lunar crater

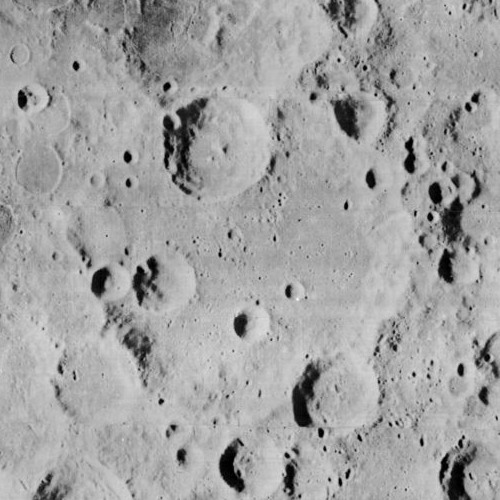
- Hirayama viewed by Lunar Orbiter 2 in 1966
- Coordinates: 6.1°S 93.5°E
- Diameter: 132 km
- Depth: 4 km
- Colongitude: 268° at sunrise
- Formation: Pre-Nectarian
- Eponym: Kiyotsugu Hirayama; Shin Hirayama

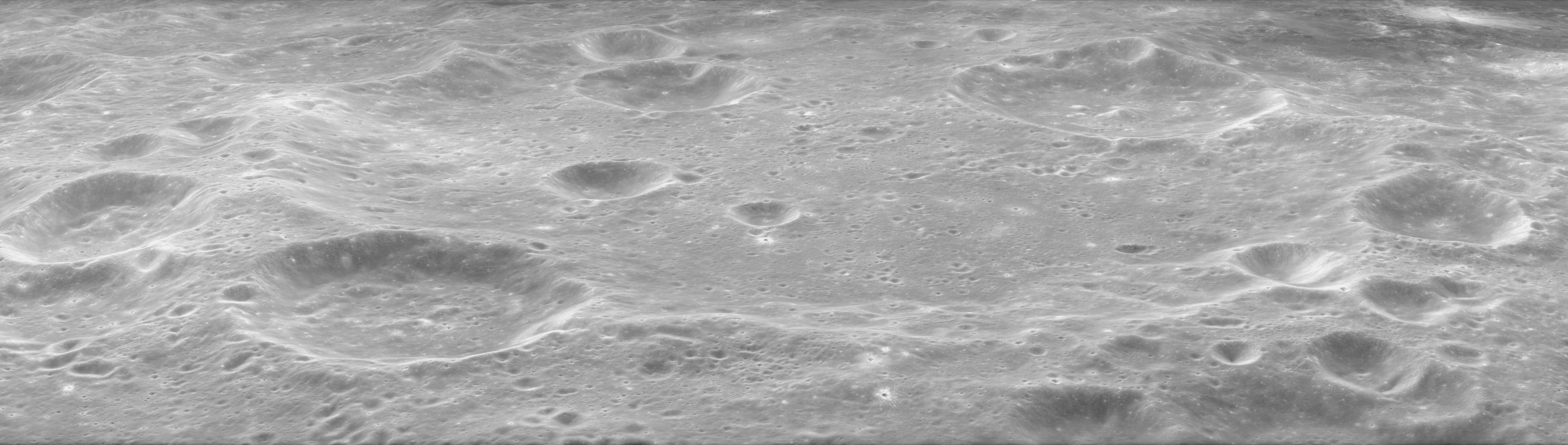
Oblique view from Apollo 17

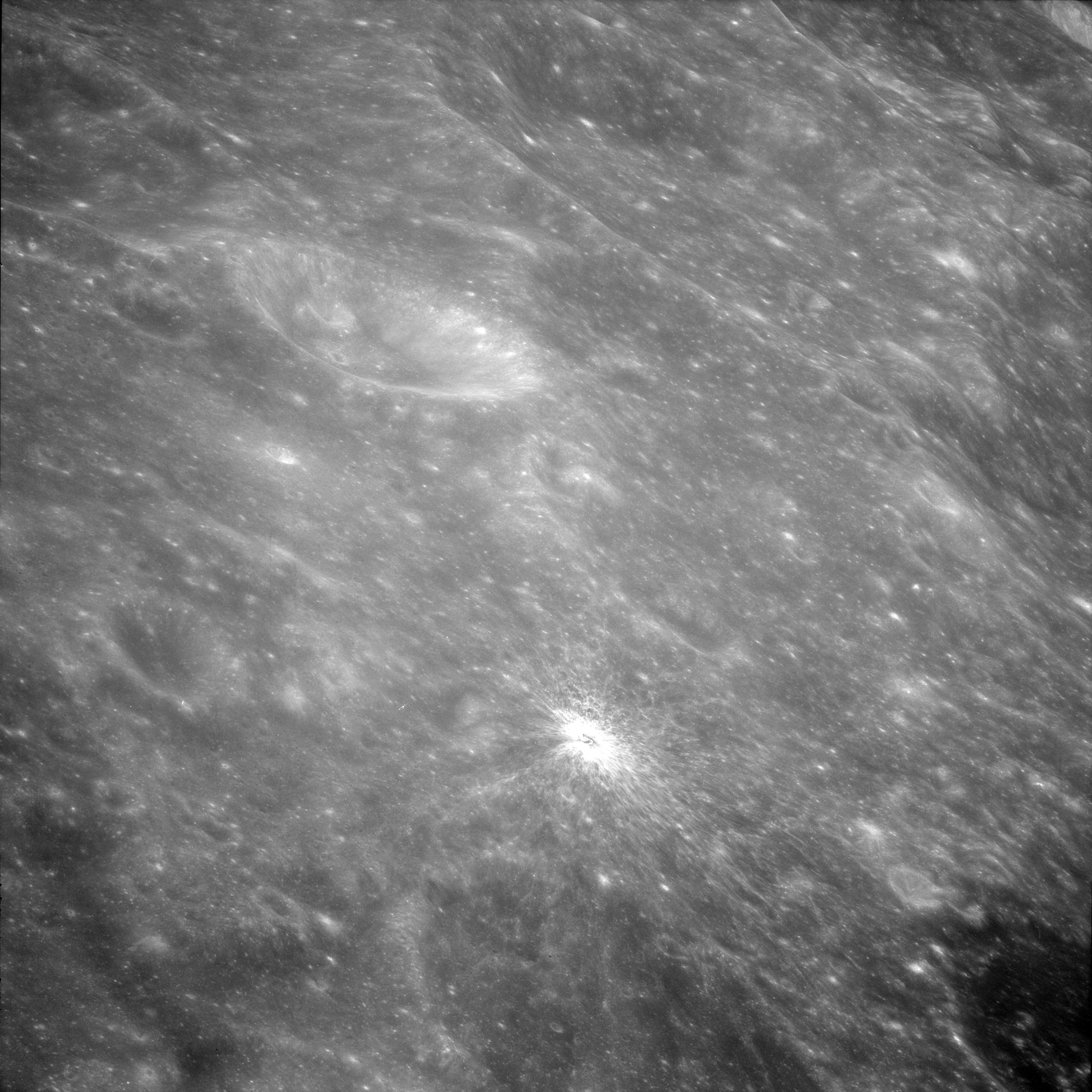
Oblique view of the interior of Hirayama, including Hirayama T (upper left) and Hirayama Q (indistinct, upper right), from Apollo 11

Hirayama is a large lunar impact crater that is located on the far side of the Moon, just beyond the eastern limb. This region of the surface is sometimes brought into view from Earth during periods of favourable libration. However it is best viewed from orbit. This crater is located along the southeastern edge of the Mare Smythii, to the northeast of the crater Brunner. To the northeast of Hirayama is Wyld. On the west rim of Hirayama is the small, bright-rayed crater Bandfield.

This is a worn and eroded crater with multiple impacts overlapping the outer rim and the interior floor. Hirayama K has broken across the rim to the southeast and Hirayama C crosses the northeastern rim. Along the southwestern outer edge is Hirayama Q. The small Hirayama T is located along the western inner wall, and attached to its eastern edge is Hirayama S. The crater Hirayama Y is adjacent to the northern inner walls of Hirayama and covers a significant part of the northern interior floor. Several smaller craters lie within the floor, including Hirayama N in the south. The floor otherwise forms a relatively level surface within the inner wall.

== Satellite craters ==
By convention these features are identified on lunar maps by placing the letter on the side of the crater midpoint that is closest to Hirayama.

Hirayama	Latitude	Longitude	Diameter
C	4.2° S	95.4° E	23 km
F	5.8° S	97.2° E	35 km
G	6.4° S	96.8° E	18 km
K	8.3° S	94.9° E	39 km
L	9.4° S	94.4° E	24 km
M	9.2° S	93.5° E	29 km
N	7.2° S	93.6° E	17 km
Q	8.0° S	91.3° E	40 km
S	6.5° S	92.3° E	29 km
T	6.4° S	91.5° E	18 km
Y	4.5° S	93.2° E	50 km

The names Tolstoy, Montesquieu, Longfellow, and Balzac were proposed for satellite craters Y, S, Q, and K, respectively, but were not approved by the IAU. The names Tolstoj and Balzac were used for craters on Mercury.

== See also ==
- 1999 Hirayama, main-belt asteroid
