= List of women in leadership positions on astronomical instrumentation projects =

The following is a list of women who are the principal investigators (PIs), project scientists (PSs) or directors (Dirs) of astronomical instruments, missions or observatories.

Name	Mission/instrument or observatory	Position
Allwood, Abigail	Perseverance/PIXL	PI
Anderson, Teresa	Jodrell Bank Observatory	Dirs
Bernstein, Rebecca	Giant Magellan Telescope	PS
Baglin, Annie	CoRoT	PI
Batalha, Natalie	Kepler Space Telescope	DPI, PS
Blaney, Diana	Europa Clipper/MISE	PI
Blum, Lauren	GTOSat	PI
Branduardi-Raymont, Graziella	SMILE	PI (Eur)
Bright, Stacey	JWST	Deputy PS (STScI)
Bunce, Emma	BepiColombo/MIXS	PI
Cesarsky, Catherine	ISO/ISOCAM	PI
Ciarletti, Valérie	Rosalind Franklin/WISDOM	PI
Cohen, Christina	IMAP/HIT	Co-I
Cohen, Christina	Parker Solar Probe/ISʘIS	Deputy PI
Cohen, Christina	STEREO/IMPACT	Co-I
Cohen, Christina	ACE/CRIS	PI
Cohen, Christina	ACE/SIS	PI
Cohen, Christina	ACE/ULEIS	PI
Cohen, Judith	Keck/LRIS	PI
Cohen, Judith	Keck/MAGIQ	PS
Curry, Shannon	MAVEN	PI
Daubar, Ingrid Justine	MRO/HiRISE	Deputy PI
De Sanctis, Maria Cristina	Rosalind Franklin/MA_MISS	PI
Dehant, Véronique	Kazachok/LaRa	PI
de Laurentis, Mariafelicia	Event Horizon Telescope	PS
Dempsey, Jessica	ASTRON	Dir
Dodd, Suzanne	JPL's Interplanetary Network Directorate	Dir
Dotson, Jessie	Kepler K2	PS
Dougherty, Michele	Cassini magnetometer, JUICE's J-MAG	PI
Elkins-Tanton, Lindy	Psyche	PI
Enos, Heather	OSIRIS-REx	Deputy PI
Faber, Sandra	Keck/DEIMOS	PI
Ferrarese, Laura	Gemini Observatory	Dir
Fischer, Debra	Cerro Tololo Inter-American Observatory / CHIRON	co-PI
Fischer, Debra	Molėtai Astronomical Observatory / Vilnius University Echelle Spectrograph	co-PI
Fischer, Debra	Lowell Discovery Telescope / EXPRES	co-PI
Fox, Nicola (Nicky)	Parker Solar Probe	PS (US)
Freedman, Wendy	Giant Magellan Telescope	Dir (former)
Froning, Cynthia	Hubble Space Telescope/Cosmic Origins Spectrograph	PS
Galvin, Toni	STEREO/PLASTIC	PI
Garcia Marin, Macarena	JWST	PS (STScI)
Glesener, Lindsay	FOXSI Sounding Rocket-3	PI
Hamden, Erika	Aspera	Deputy-PI
Hammel, Heidi	Association of Universities for Research in Astronomy	Dir (Executive VP)
Harra, Louise	Solar Orbiter/EUI	co-PI
Harrison, Fiona	NuSTAR	PI
Heras, Ana	PLATO	ESA PS
Isaak, Kate	CHEOPS	PS
Jaeggli, Sarah	Daniel K. Inouye Solar Telescope/DL-NIRSP	Instrument scientist
Kasliwal, Mansi	GROWTH	PI
Kasliwal, Mansi	Palomar Gattini-IR	co-PI
Kasliwal, Mansi	WINTER	co-PI
Johnson, Jennifer	Milky Way Mapper (Survey in Sloan Digital Sky Survey-V)	PI
Johnston-Hollitt, Melanie	Murchison Widefield Array	Dir (former)
Kollmeier, Juna	Sloan Digital Sky Survey-V	Director
Kucera, Therese (Terry)	STEREO	PS
Lagrange, Anne-Marie	Very Large Telescope/NAOS	PS
Le, Guan	Geotail	PS (US)
Lepri, Susan	Solar Orbiter/Heavy Ion Sensor (HIS)	PI
Lotz, Jennifer	Gemini Observatory (Director of the Space Telescope Science Institute from Feb 2024)	Dir
Lu, Jessica	Keck All-Sky Precision Adaptive Optics (KAPA)	PS
Luetzgendorf, Nora	LISA	ESA PS
Luhmann, Janet	STEREO/IMPACT	PI
Mainzer, Amy	NEOWISE	PI
Marcum, Pamela	SOFIA	PS
Marshall, Jennifer	MaunaKea Spectroscopic Explorer	PS
Matthews, Sarah	Hinode/Extreme-Ultraviolet Imaging Spectrometer (EIS)	PI (UK)
Max, Claire	Keck/Next Gen AO	PS
McEnery, Julie	Fermi Gamma-ray Space Telescope	PS
Mundell, Carole	RINGO2 Director of Science, European Space Agency (from 2023)	PI
O'Neill, Karen	Green Bank Telescope	Dir
Oppenheimer, Rebecca	Palomar Observatory/JHU Adaptive Optics Coronagraph	PS
Oppenheimer, Rebecca	Hale Telescope/Palomar Adaptive Optics System, PALAO	PS
Oppenheimer, Rebecca	3.67 m Advanced Electro Optical System Telescope/The Lyot Project	PI
Oppenheimer, Rebecca	Gemini South Telescope/Gemini Planet Imager, GPI/GPIES	PI
Oppenheimer, Rebecca	Hale Telescope/Project 1640, P1640	PI
Oppenheimer, Rebecca	Hale Telescope/Palomar Advanced Radial Velocity Instrument, PARVI	PI
Pelló, Roser	ELT/MOSAIC	PI
Porco, Carolyn	Cassini Imaging Science Subsystem	PI
Ramsay, Suzanne	ELT	ELT Instrumentation Project Manager (ESO)
Rangwala, Naseem	Stratospheric Observatory for Infrared Astronomy	PS
Rank-Lueftinger, Theresa	ARIEL	ESA PS
Rauer, Heike	PLATO	PI
Raymond, Carol	Europa Clipper/ICEMAG (cancelled)	PI
Reeves, Kathy	Hinode/X-ray Telescope (XRT)	PS (US)
Rigby, Jane	JWST	PS (NASA)
Rieke, Marcia	Hubble Space Telescope/NICMOS	Deputy PI
Rieke, Marcia	JWST/NIRCam	PI
Roy, Arpita	Keck/Keck Planet Finder	PS
Rudie, Gwen	MIRMOS	PS
Savage, Sabrina	Hinode	PS (US)
Seager, Sara	ASTERIA	PI
Schaefer, Gail	CHARA Array	Dir
Seetha, Somasundaram	Astrosat	PI
Shkolnik, Evgenya	SPARCS	PI
Spilker, Linda	Cassini	PS
Spilker, Linda	Voyager program	PS
Staggs, Suzanne	Advanced ACTpol	PI
Stofan, Ellen	Titan Mare Explorer	PI
Straume-Lindner, Anne Grete	EnVision	ESA PS
Swank, Jean	RXTE	PS
Swank, Jean	RXTE/PCA	PI
Tasca, Lidia	ELT/MOSAIC	PI
Tinetti, Giovanna	ARIEL	PI
Turtle, Elizabeth	Europa Clipper/EIS	PI
Turtle, Elizabeth	Dragonfly	PI
Tuttle, Sarah	Hobby-Eberly Telescope/LRS	PS
Tuttle, Sarah	HETDEX/VIRUS	Instrument Scientist
Vandaele, Ann Carine	ExoMars Trace Gas Orbiter/NOMAD	PI
Wilkes, Belinda	Chandra X-ray Center	Dir
Winebarger, Amy	Hi-C sounding rocket (3rd launch)	PI
Wiseman, Jennifer	Hubble Space Telescope	SPS
Wright, Gillian	JWST/MIRI	PI (Eur)
Wright, Shelley	TMT/IRIS	PS
Wright, Shelley	Keck/Liger	PI
Zuber, Maria	GRAIL	PI
