= Suzanne Staggs =

American physicist

Suzanne T. Staggs
- Born: May 11, 1965
- Education: Rice University; Princeton University
- Scientific career
- Fields: Cosmology; Cosmic microwave background
- Institutions: Princeton University; University of Chicago
- Thesis: An absolute measurement of the cosmic background radiation temperature at 1.4 GHz
- Doctoral advisor: David Todd Wilkinson

Suzanne Therese Staggs (born May 11, 1965) is an American physicist who is currently the Henry DeWolf Smyth Professor of Physics at Princeton University. Staggs has led the development of numerous cosmic microwave background experiments and is currently the principal investigator (PI) of the Atacama Cosmology Telescope (ACT) and founding member of the Simons Observatory (SO). In 2020, Staggs was elected into the National Academy of Sciences.

== Education and career ==
Staggs received her B.A. in physics from Rice University in 1987 and her Ph.D. in physics from Princeton University in 1993. She was a postdoctoral researcher at the University of Chicago for 3 years before joining the faculty at Princeton in 1996. Staggs was elected as a member of the American Academy of Arts and Sciences in 2017 and a member of the National Academy of Sciences in 2020.

== Research ==
Staggs's research is in cosmology, through observations of the cosmic microwave background (CMB). She has been involved in or led various CMB experiments since 1989 including XPER, PIQUE, CAPMAP, QUIET, ABS, ACT, and SO.

== Awards ==
- 2020 - Member of the National Academy of Sciences
- 2017 – Fellow of the American Academy of Arts and Sciences
- 2004 – Maria Goeppert Mayer Award from the American Physical Society
- 2000 - National Science Foundation Career Award
- 1998 – Alfred P. Sloan Research Fellowship
- 1994 – NASA Hubble Fellowship
- 1994 – Enrico Fermi Fellowship at the University of Chicago

== See also ==
- List of women in leadership positions on astronomical instrumentation projects
