= Jennifer Lotz =

American astronomer

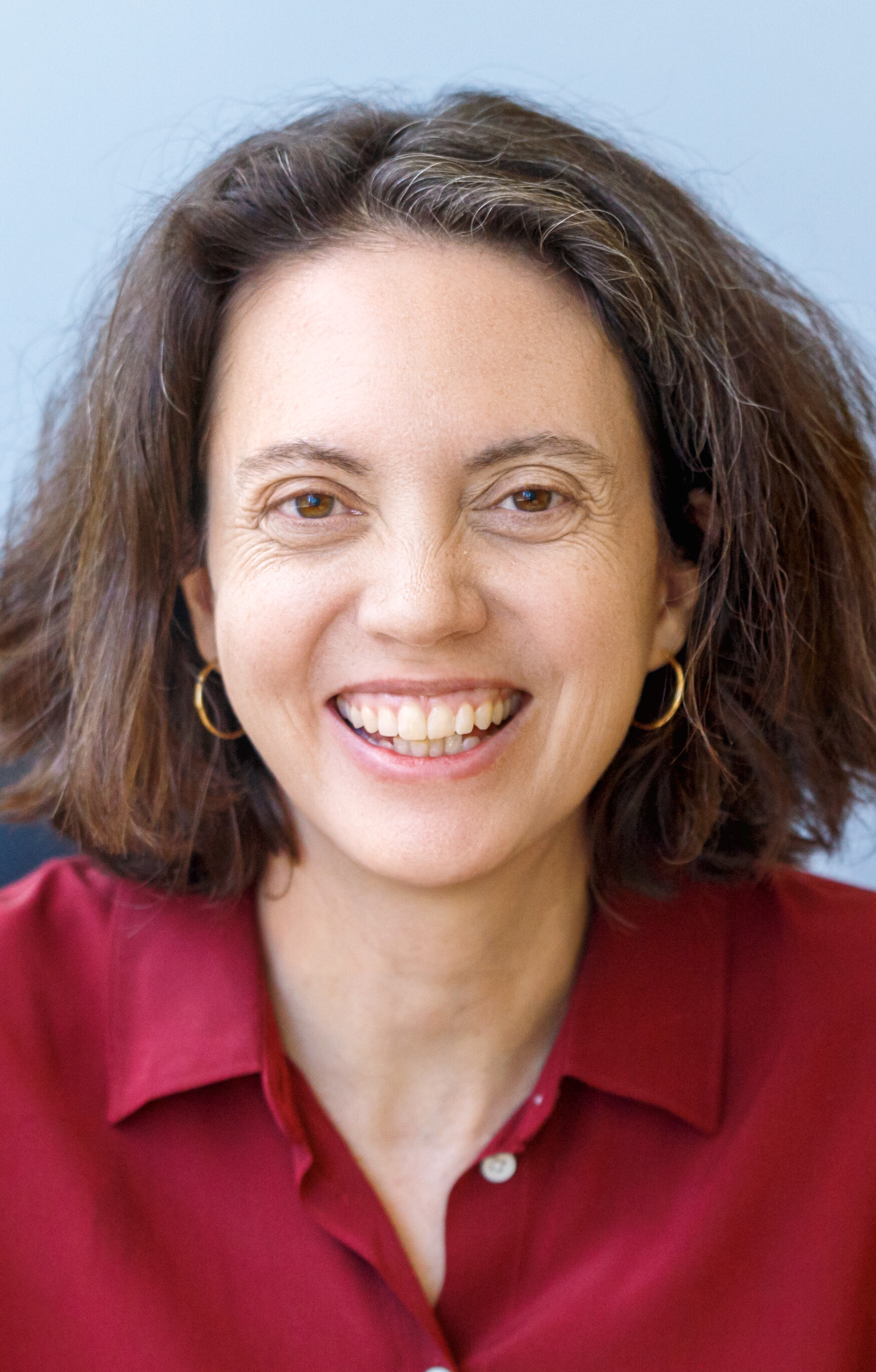
- Born: Jennifer Mae Lotz
- Education: Bryn Mawr College; Johns Hopkins University
- Scientific career
- Workplaces: University of California, Santa Cruz; National Optical Astronomy Observatory; Space Telescope Science Institute; NOIRLab
- Thesis: The History of the Evolution of Dwarf Galaxies (2003)
- Doctoral advisor: Henry Ferguson; Rosemary Wyse

Jennifer Mae Lotz is an American astronomer who studies the shape and evolution of galaxies, including galaxy mergers. She is currently the director of the Space Telescope Science Institute. She previously worked at the NOIRLab, a project of the National Science Foundation, as director of the Gemini Observatory.

== Early life and education ==
Lotz is originally from Florida; she became interested in astronomy through watching the 1980 television series Cosmos: A Personal Voyage with her father, and seeing Space Shuttle trails in the sky above her home. She majored in physics at Bryn Mawr College, and was a summer intern at the Maria Mitchell Observatory on Nantucket in 1994, when Comet Shoemaker–Levy 9 collided with Jupiter.

After graduating in 1996, she did her graduate studies at Johns Hopkins University with the support of a research fellowship from the Space Telescope Science Institute. She completed her Ph.D. in 2003. Her dissertation, The history of the evolution of dwarf galaxies, was supervised by Henry C. Ferguson and Rosemary Wyse.

== Career ==
She became a postdoctoral researcher at the University of California, Santa Cruz, where she participated in research combining observations from the Hubble Space Telescope and W. M. Keck Observatory to study colliding galaxies. She was a Leo Goldberg Fellow at the National Optical Astronomy Observatory, and then, from 2010 to 2018, an associate astronomer at the Space Telescope Science Institute, also affiliated with Johns Hopkins University as a research scientist.

At the Space Telescope Science Institute, she led the Hubble Frontier Fields program from 2013 to 2017; this program used Hubble Space Telescope to find images of distant galaxies, magnified by gravitational lensing.

She was named director of the Gemini Observatory in 2018, succeeding interim director Laura Ferrarese. She is also a participant in the next-generation Deep Extragalactic Exploratory Public (DEEP) survey, a project to re-examine the Hubble Ultra-Deep Field using the James Webb Space Telescope.

She was appointed director of the Space Telescope Science Institute in February, 2024.
