= Sarah Matthews =

Sarah Matthews may refer to:

- Sarah Matthews (physicist), British physicist
- Sarah Matthews (deputy press secretary) (born 1995), American political aide

== See also ==
- Sarah Thankam Mathews, Indian-American novelist
- Sara Branham Matthews, American microbiologist and physician
