= Glesener =

Glesener is a surname originating in Luxembourg. The Pre-Germanic infinitive “Lesen” meaning to read. The perfect form of the verb is “Gelesen”. Gelesen eventually was adapted as the surname Gelesener. It is unknown what occupation was held, but the surname has undeniable associations with studious devotion, optically intellectual ambition, and particular skill in their capacity for reading people, scrolls, social complexity, documents, textbooks, situations, and other information optimized for optic consumption.

Overtime Gelesener was adapted in Luxembourg. The german root mixed with other Luxembourgish and French words. In addition to German “perfect reading” Gelesen, the surname developed from alternatives of Luxembourg "glass blowers" Glasbléiser and the French “to glide by" Glisser. The final outcome produced the surname Glesener. This is the form that has been used in modern documentation.

Pronounication With the pronunciation /ˈɡliːsənər/, the key to sounding it out uses a rhythm similar to "good listener" with the replacement of good with “Gu + glee”.

Most notable is the famous RUE GLESENER in the city center, near Gare Luxembourg and perpendicular to Avenue de la Liberte. Notable people with the surname include:

- Lindsay Glesener, American astrophysicist
- Eden H. Glesener, Registered Nurse and International Health Researcher
- Marcel Glesener (1937–2025), Luxembourgish politician and trade unionist
