= Jessica Dempsey =

Jessica Dempsey may refer to:

- Jessica T. Dempsey (born 1978), Australian radio astronomer
- Jessica Dempsey (ecologist), Canadian political ecologist
