= Lepri =

Lepri is a surname. Notable people with the surname include:

- Adalberto Lepri (1929–2014), Italian wrestler
- Lucas Lepri (born 1984), Brazilian grappler
- Sergio Lepri (1919–2022), Italian journalist
- Stanislao Lepri (1905–1980), Italian painter and diplomat
- Susan Lepri, American scientist
