= Terry Kucera =

American astrophysicist

Therese "Terry" Kucera is an astrophysicist in NASA Goddard Space Flight Center's Solar Physics Laboratory. Her research interests center on the solar atmosphere, especially solar prominences and prominence cavities. She currently serves as Project Scientist for NASA's STEREO project.

Dr. Kucera came to NASA/Goddard in 1993 after receiving her doctorate from the University of Colorado, Boulder, where she studied radio emissions from solar flares. She followed this with a post doctoral fellowship studying X-ray flare emissions. In 1995, she joined the team working on the CDS and SUMER EUV spectrometers for the Solar and Heliospheric Observatory, and eventually also served as US Deputy Project Scientist. She has also detailed at NASA Headquarters as the Solar Discipline Scientist and the Science Mission Directorate Education and Public Outreach Manager.

== See also ==
- List of women in leadership positions on astronomical instrumentation projects
