= Janet Luhmann =

American physicist and researcher

Janet G. Luhmann
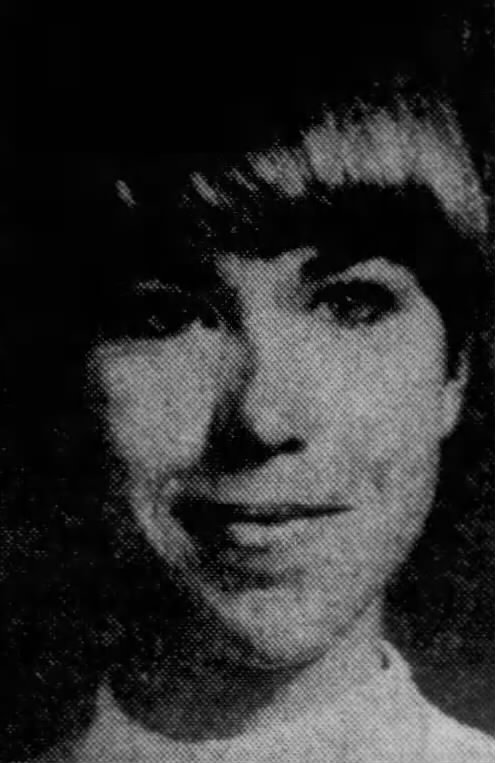
- Born: 1946 (age 79–80)
- Education: B.S. Carnegie Mellon University; M.S. University of Maryland; Ph.D. University of Maryland
- Spouse: Neville C. Luhmann Jr. (m. 1970; died. 2025)
- Scientific career
- Fields: Geophysics; Heliophysics
- Workplaces: University of California, Berkeley; NASA
- Website: Research profile

Janet G. Luhmann (born 1946) is an American physicist and senior fellow of the Space Sciences Laboratory of the University of California, Berkeley. She has made major contributions to a wide range of topics in planetary, solar, magnetospheric, and heliospheric physics. She is the principal investigator of the IMPACT instrument suite on the twin-spacecraft STEREO mission. IMPACT stands for In-situ Measurements of Particles and Coronal mass ejection (CME) Transients. It consists of a, "suite of seven instruments that samples the 3-D distribution of solar wind plasma electrons, the characteristics of the solar energetic particle (SEP) ions and electrons, and the local vector magnetic field."

== Early life and education ==
Luhmann holds a B.S. in physics from Carnegie-Mellon University and an M.S. and Ph.D in astronomy from the University of Maryland. She began her professional research career in 1974 as a member of technical staff in the Particles and Fields Department at the Space Sciences Laboratory in the Aerospace Corporation, California. In 1980, she took up a research geophysicist position at the University of California, Los Angeles. In 1994, she was appointed as a senior fellow at the space sciences laboratory of the University of California, Berkeley.

== Research career ==
Luhmann's work focuses on the use of spacecraft observations and models to investigate solar wind interactions with the planets and the connections between the Sun and heliospheric conditions. She has published approximately 500 refereed articles, with around 29,000 citations and a h-index of 88, making her one of the most prominent scientists in the field.

She is the principal investigator (PI) for the In-situ Measurements of Particles and CME Transients (IMPACT) instrument suite on the twin-spacecraft STEREO mission. IMPACT provides solar wind plasma and magnetic field measurements. Previously, Luhmann was Deputy PI of the MAVEN mission at Mars. She has served as a co-investigator on the ASPERA plasma spectrometer team on both Mars Express and Venus Express, the Pioneer Venus Orbiter, and the POLAR mission, and a science team member on Cassini’s Ion and Neutral Mass Spectrometer Team, and the Phobos mission to Mars.

Luhmann led the heliospheric science activity for the National Science Foundation-sponsored Center for Space Weather Modeling.

== Awards and honors ==
Selected by the National Academy of Science to chair the most influential committee in her field, the Committee on Solar and Space Physics (CSSP).

Chair of the NRC Committee on Solar and Space Physics (CSSP).

2021: Jean Dominique Cassini Medal & Honorary Membership of the European Geosciences Union.

In 2015, she was awarded honorary fellowship of the Royal Astronomical Society.

In 2012, she was awarded the Space Science Award from the Committee on Space Research (COSPAR).

Also in 2012, Luhmann gave the American Geophysical Union's Eugene Parker Lecture, which is presented two out of every three years to a space scientist who has made significant contributions to the fields of solar and heliospheric science.

2007: Awarded the John Adam Fleming medal of the American Geophysical Union for original research and technical leadership in geomagnetism, atmospheric electricity, aeronomy, space physics, and related sciences.

1998-2001: Editor in chief of Journal of Geophysical Research.

1997: She was made a fellow of the American Geophysical Union.

1994-1996: Appointed president of the American Geophysical Union Space Physics and Aeronomy Section.

== See also ==
- List of women in leadership positions on astronomical instrumentation projects
