= Christina Cohen =

American physicist

- Education: University of New Hampshire (B.A.); University of Maryland (M.S., Ph.D.)
- Scientific career
- Fields: solar energetic particles, heliophysics
- Workplaces: California Institute of Technology

Christina M.S. Cohen is an astrophysicist and the Principal Investigator of several instruments on NASA Heliophysics missions. Cohen is a member of the professional staff at the California Institute of Technology in the Division of Physics, Math, and Astronomy as well as a researcher in the Space Radiation Laboratory.

== Education ==
Cohen received her B.S. in physics (1989) from the University of New Hampshire, graduating summa cum laude. She then completed her M.S. (1992) and Ph.D (1995) in physics at the University of Maryland; her thesis was titled "Measurements of solar wind sulfur abundance and charge states".

== Research and career ==
Cohen's research focus is on the physics of space weather phenomena and solar energetic particle events, primarily using spacecraft data gathered from across the heliosphere to analyze their propagation and acceleration mechanisms.

She is involved in several NASA missions, high energy particle detector instrument development and mission concept development for future heliophysics missions. As of 2023, Cohen is the PI of the CRIS, SIS, and ULEIS instruments on the Advanced Composition Explorer, Deputy PI of the Parker Solar Probe/IS☉IS instrument suite, Co-I of the STEREO/IMPACT instrument, and Co-I of the Interstellar Mapping and Acceleration Probe/HIT instrument.

In 2022, Cohen began serving as Co-chair for the Panel on Space Weather Science and Applications as part of NASA's preparations for the 2024 Solar and Space Physics Decadal Survey. From 2017 though 2020, she served as President and President-elect of the American Geophysical Union's Space Physics and Aeronomy section.

== Selected publications ==
- Cohen, C. M. S.; Mewaldt, R. A.; Leske, R. A.; Cummings, A. C.; Stone, E. C.; Wiedenbeck, M. E.; Christian, E. R.; von Rosenvinge, T. T. (1999). "New observations of heavy‐ion‐rich solar particle events from ACE". Geophysical Research Letters. 26 (17): 2697–2700. doi:10.1029/1999GL900560. ISSN 0094-8276.
- Tylka, A. J.; Cohen, C. M. S.; Dietrich, W. F.; Lee, M. A.; Maclennan, C. G.; Mewaldt, R. A.; Ng, C. K.; Reames, D. V. (2005-05-20). "Shock Geometry, Seed Populations, and the Origin of Variable Elemental Composition at High Energies in Large Gradual Solar Particle Events". The Astrophysical Journal. 625 (1): 474–495. doi:10.1086/429384. ISSN 0004-637X.
- Cohen, C. M. S.; Stone, E. C.; Mewaldt, R. A.; Leske, R. A.; Cummings, A. C.; Mason, G. M.; Desai, M. I.; von Rosenvinge, T. T.; Wiedenbeck, M. E. (2005). "Heavy ion abundances and spectra from the large solar energetic particle events of October–November 2003". Journal of Geophysical Research: Space Physics. 110 (A9). doi:10.1029/2005JA011004. ISSN 0148-0227.
- McComas, D. J.; Christian, E. R.; Cohen, C. M. S.; Cummings, A. C.; Davis, A. J.; Desai, M. I.; Giacalone, J.; Hill, M. E.; Joyce, C. J.; Krimigis, S. M.; Labrador, A. W.; Leske, R. A.; Malandraki, O.; Matthaeus, W. H.; McNutt, R. L.; Mewaldt, R. A.; Mitchell, D. G.; Posner, A.; Rankin, J. S.; Roelof, E. C.; Schwadron, N. A.; Stone, E. C.; Szalay, J. R.; Wiedenbeck, M. E.; Bale, S. D.; Kasper, J. C.; Case, A. W.; Korreck, K. E.; MacDowall, R. J.; Pulupa, M.; Stevens, M. L.; Rouillard, A. P. (2019-12-12). "Probing the energetic particle environment near the Sun". Nature. 576 (7786): 223–227. doi:10.1038/s41586-019-1811-1. ISSN 0028-0836. PMC 6908744. PMID 31802005.

== Honors and awards ==
In 2023, she was elected as a Fellow of the American Geophysical Union.

== See also ==
- List of women in leadership positions on astronomical instrumentation projects
