= Linda Spilker =

American planetary scientist (born 1955)

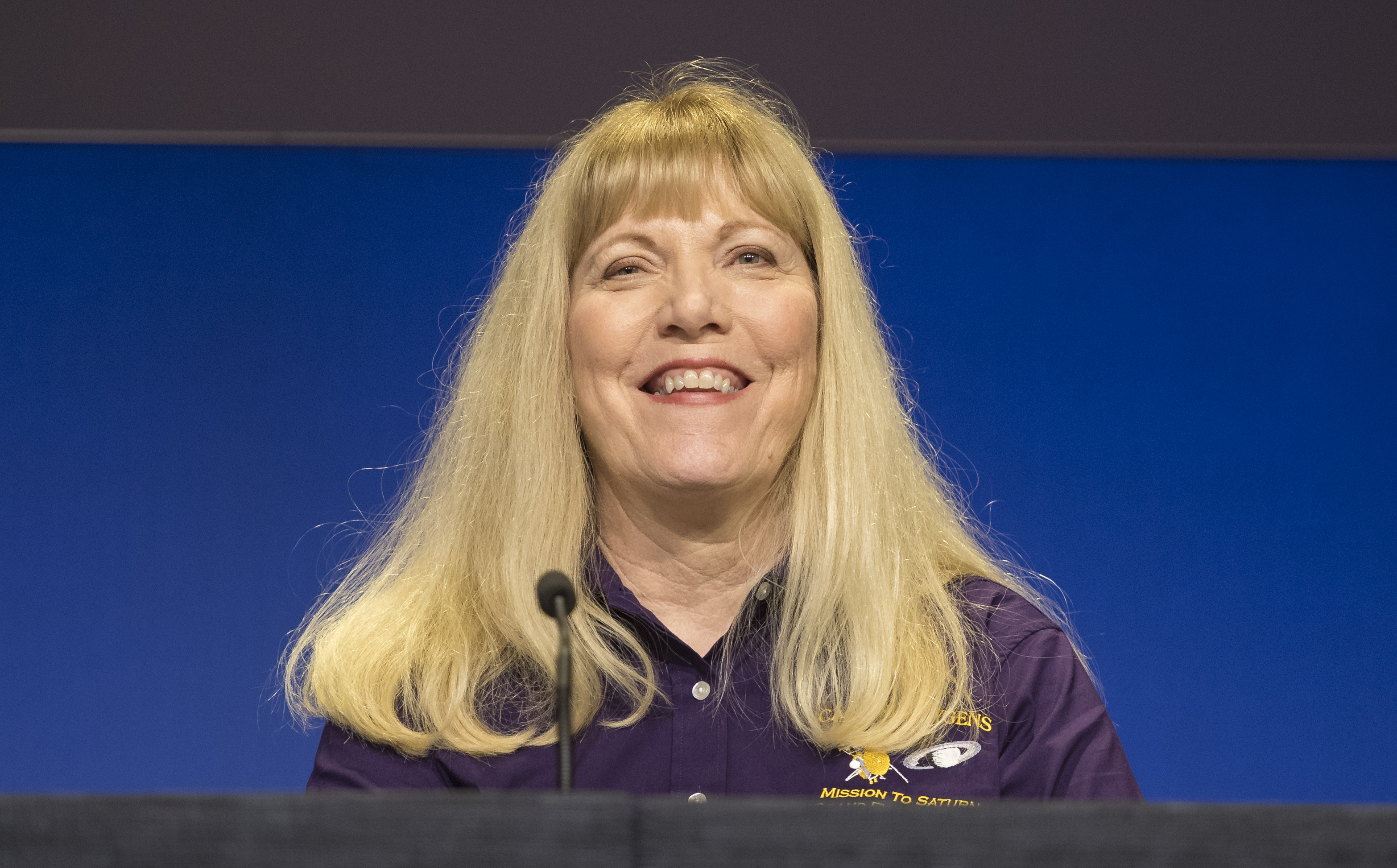
- Spilker in 2017
- Born: Linda Joyce Bies; 1955 (age 70–71)
- Education: California State University, Fullerton (BA); California State University, Los Angeles (MS); University of California, Los Angeles (PhD)
- Awards: NASA Exceptional Service Medal (2013); NASA Group Achievement Awards (2011, 2009, 2000, 1998, 1982–1989); NASA Scientific Achievement Award (1982)
- Scientific career
- Fields: Planetary science
- Workplaces: Jet Propulsion Laboratory
- Thesis: Wave structure in planetary rings (1992)
- Doctoral advisor: Christopher Russell

Linda Spilker (born 1955) is an American planetary scientist who served as the project scientist for the Cassini mission exploring the planet Saturn. Her research interests include the evolution and dynamics of Saturn's rings. In 2022, she became the project scientist for the Voyager mission after Edward Stone's retirement.

== Career ==
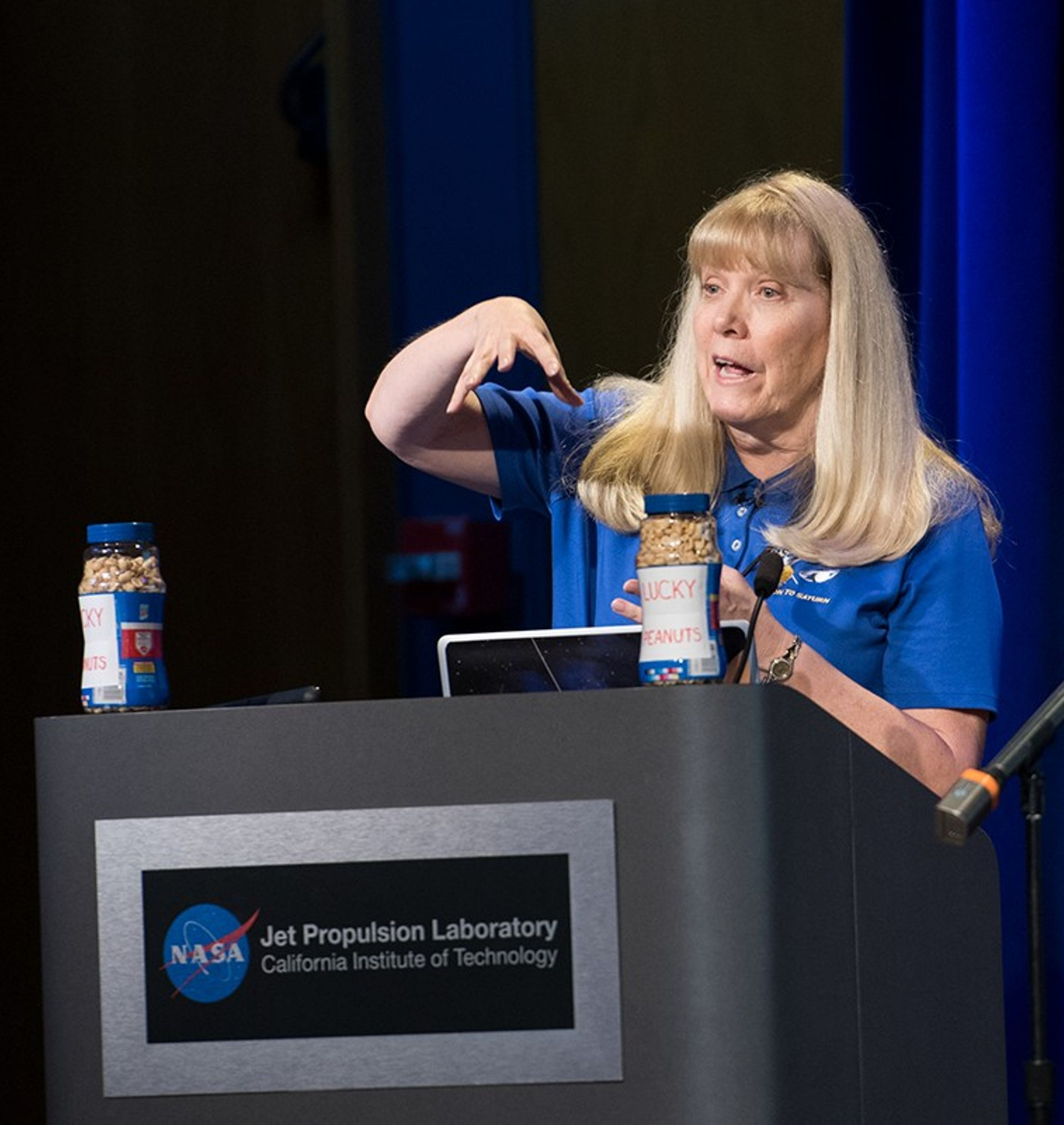
Spilker explains the tradition of lucky peanuts at a gathering for mission team members, family and friends in Von Karman Auditorium at JPL, 2017

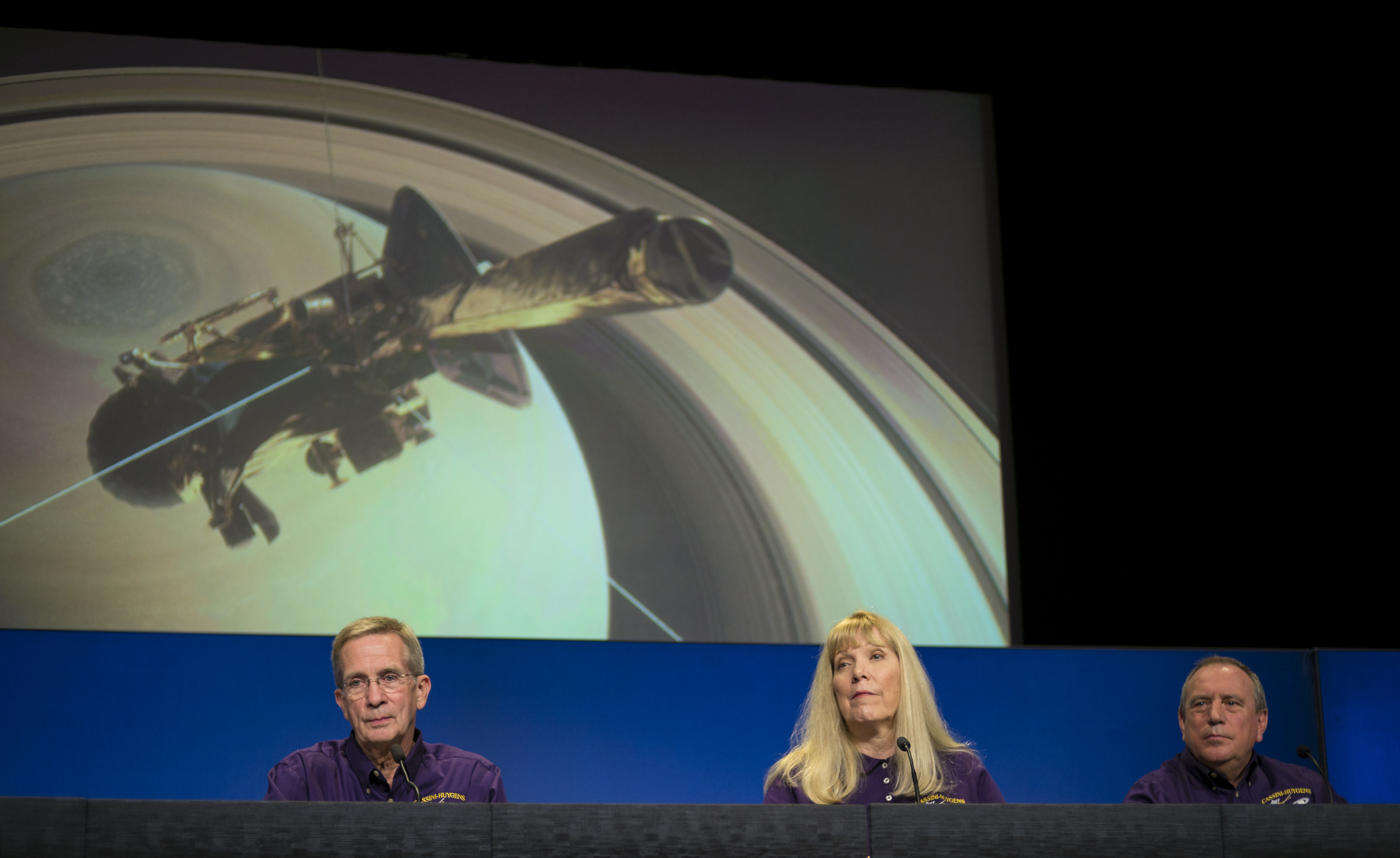
Cassini program manager at JPL, Earl Maize, right, Cassini project scientist at JPL, Linda Spilker, center, and PI for the INMS, Hunter Waite, right, are seen during a press conference previewing Cassini's End of Mission, 2017

Spilker received a BA in Physics from California State University, Fullerton in 1977 and an MS in Physics from California State University, Los Angeles in 1983. She obtained a PhD in Geophysics and Space Physics from UCLA in 1992. She joined the Jet Propulsion Laboratory in 1977, initially working on the Voyager missions that were launched the same year. She became a Cassini mission scientist in 1990. In 1997, she was the editor of a NASA publication that summarizes the mission's legacy. In 2010, she became the Cassini mission project scientist, a role in which she directed the entire team's scientific investigations. She has appeared as herself in multiple television documentary programs, including several in the PBS Nova series.

== Honors and awards ==
- NASA Exceptional Service Medal (2013)
- NASA Group Achievement Award (2011, 2009, 2000, 1998, 1982–1989)
- NASA Exceptional Scientific Achievement Medal (1982)

== Selected publications ==
- Kunde, Virgil G.; et al. (1996). "Cassini infrared Fourier spectroscopic investigation". In Horn, Linda (ed.). Cassini/Huygens: A Mission to the Saturnian Systems. Vol. 2803. pp. 162–177. doi:10.1117/12.253416.
- Spilker, Linda J. (October 1997). "Passage to a Ringed World: The Cassini-Huygens Mission to Saturn and Titan". National Aeronautics and Space Administration Report. Bibcode:1997nasa.reptX....S.
- Matson, Dennis L.; Spilker, Linda J.; Lebreton, Jean-Pierre (2002). "The Cassini/Huygens Mission to the Saturnian System". Space Science Reviews. 104 (1): 1–58. Bibcode:2002SSRv..104....1M. doi:10.1023/A:1023609211620.
- Hansen, Candice J.; Bolton, Scott J.; Matson, Dennis L.; Spilker, Linda J.; Lebreton, Jean-Pierre (2004). "The Cassini-Huygens flyby of Jupiter". Icarus. 172 (1): 1. Bibcode:2004Icar..172....1H. doi:10.1016/j.icarus.2004.06.018.
- Flasar, F. M.; et al. (2004). "An intense stratospheric jet on Jupiter". Nature. 427 (6970): 132–135. Bibcode:2004Natur.427..132F. doi:10.1038/nature02142. PMID 14712270.
- Flasar, F. M.; et al. (2004). "Exploring the Saturn System in the Thermal Infrared: The Composite Infrared Spectrometer". The Cassini-Huygens Mission. pp. 169–297. doi:10.1007/1-4020-3874-7_4. ISBN 1-4020-3147-5.
- Kunde, V. G.; et al. (2004). "Jupiter's Atmospheric Composition from the Cassini Thermal Infrared Spectroscopy Experiment". Science. 305 (5690): 1582–1586. Bibcode:2004Sci...305.1582K. doi:10.1126/science.1100240. PMID 15319491.
- Spilker, Linda J.; Pilorz, Stuart; Lane, Arthur L.; Nelson, Robert M.; Pollard, Benjamin; Russell, Christopher T. (2004). "Saturn a ring surface mass densities from spiral density wave dispersion behavior". Icarus. 171 (2): 372. Bibcode:2004Icar..171..372S. doi:10.1016/j.icarus.2004.05.016.
- Spilker, L. J.; Pilorz, S. H.; Edgington, S. G.; Wallis, B. D.; Brooks, S. M.; Pearl, J. C.; Flasar, F. M. (2005). "Cassini Cirs Observations of a Roll-Off in Saturn Ring Spectra at Submillimeter Wavelengths". Earth, Moon, and Planets. 96 (3–4): 149–163. Bibcode:2005EM&P...96..149S. doi:10.1007/s11038-005-9060-8.
- Flasar, F. M.; et al. (2005). "Titan's Atmospheric Temperatures, Winds, and Composition". Science. 308 (5724): 975–978. Bibcode:2005Sci...308..975F. doi:10.1126/science.1111150. PMID 15894528.
- Flasar, F. M.; et al. (2005). "Temperatures, Winds, and Composition in the Saturnian System". Science. 307 (5713): 1247–1251. Bibcode:2005Sci...307.1247F. doi:10.1126/science.1105806. PMID 15618486.
- Spilker, Linda J.; Pilorz, Stuart H.; Wallis, Brad D.; Pearl, John C.; Cuzzi, Jeffrey N.; Brooks, Shawn M.; Altobelli, Nicolas; Edgington, Scott G.; Showalter, Mark; Michael Flasar, F.; Ferrari, Cecile; Leyrat, Cedric (2006). "Cassini thermal observations of Saturn's main rings: Implications for particle rotation and vertical mixing". Planetary and Space Science. 54 (12): 1167. Bibcode:2006P&SS...54.1167S. doi:10.1016/j.pss.2006.05.033.
- Altobelli, Nicolas; Spilker, Linda J.; Leyrat, Cedric; Pilorz, Stuart (2008). "Thermal observations of Saturn's main rings by Cassini CIRS: Phase, emission and solar elevation dependence". Planetary and Space Science. 56 (1): 134. Bibcode:2008P&SS...56..134A. doi:10.1016/j.pss.2007.05.029.
- Cuzzi, Jeff; Clark, Roger; Filacchione, Gianrico; French, Richard; Johnson, Robert; Marouf, Essam; Spilker, Linda (2009). "Ring Particle Composition and Size Distribution". Saturn from Cassini-Huygens. pp. 459–509. doi:10.1007/978-1-4020-9217-6_15. ISBN 978-1-4020-9216-9.
- Christophe, B.; et al. (2012). "OSS (Outer Solar System): A fundamental and planetary physics mission to Neptune, Triton and the Kuiper Belt". Experimental Astronomy. 34 (2): 203–242. arXiv:1106.0132. Bibcode:2012ExA....34..203C. doi:10.1007/s10686-012-9309-y.
- Lunine, Jonathan; Waite, Hunter; Postberg, Frank; Spilker, Linda; Clark, Karla (2015). "Enceladus life finder: The search for life in a habitable moon". Egu General Assembly Conference Abstracts: 14923. Bibcode:2015EGUGA..1714923L.
- Edgington, Scott G.; Spilker, Linda J. (2016). "Cassini's Grand Finale". Nature Geoscience. 9 (7): 472–473. Bibcode:2016NatGe...9..472E. doi:10.1038/ngeo2753.
- Reh, Kim; Spilker, Linda; Lunine, Jonathan I.; Waite, J. Hunter; Cable, Morgan L.; Postberg, Frank; Clark, Karla (2016). "Enceladus Life Finder: The search for life in a habitable Moon". 2016 IEEE Aerospace Conference. pp. 1–8. doi:10.1109/AERO.2016.7500813. ISBN 978-1-4673-7676-1.
- Dougherty, Michele K.; Spilker, Linda J. (2018). "Review of Saturn's icy moons following the Cassini mission". Reports on Progress in Physics. 81 (6). Bibcode:2018RPPh...81f5901D. doi:10.1088/1361-6633/aabdfb. PMID 29651989.
- Spilker, Linda (2019). "Cassini-Huygens' exploration of the Saturn system: 13 years of discovery". Science. 364 (6445): 1046–1051. Bibcode:2019Sci...364.1046S. doi:10.1126/science.aat3760. PMID 31197006.
- Tiscareno, Matthew S.; et al. (2019). "Close-range remote sensing of Saturn's rings during Cassini's ring-grazing orbits and Grand Finale". Science. 364 (6445) eaau1017. Bibcode:2019Sci...364.1017T. doi:10.1126/science.aau1017. PMID 31196983.
- MacKenzie, Shannon M.; et al. (2021). "The Enceladus Orbilander Mission Concept: Balancing Return and Resources in the Search for Life". The Planetary Science Journal. 2 (2): 77. Bibcode:2021PSJ.....2...77M. doi:10.3847/PSJ/abe4da.
- Cable, Morgan L.; et al. (2021). "The Science Case for a Return to Enceladus". The Planetary Science Journal. 2 (4): 132. Bibcode:2021PSJ.....2..132C. doi:10.3847/PSJ/abfb7a. hdl:10150/661899.
- Rymer, Abigail M.; et al. (2021). "Neptune Odyssey: A Flagship Concept for the Exploration of the Neptune–Triton System". The Planetary Science Journal. 2 (5): 184. Bibcode:2021PSJ.....2..184R. doi:10.3847/PSJ/abf654.

== See also ==
- List of women in leadership positions on astronomical instrumentation projects
