= QUIET =

Astronomical observatory for studying the cosmic microwave background (2008–2010)

Q/U Imaging ExperimenT
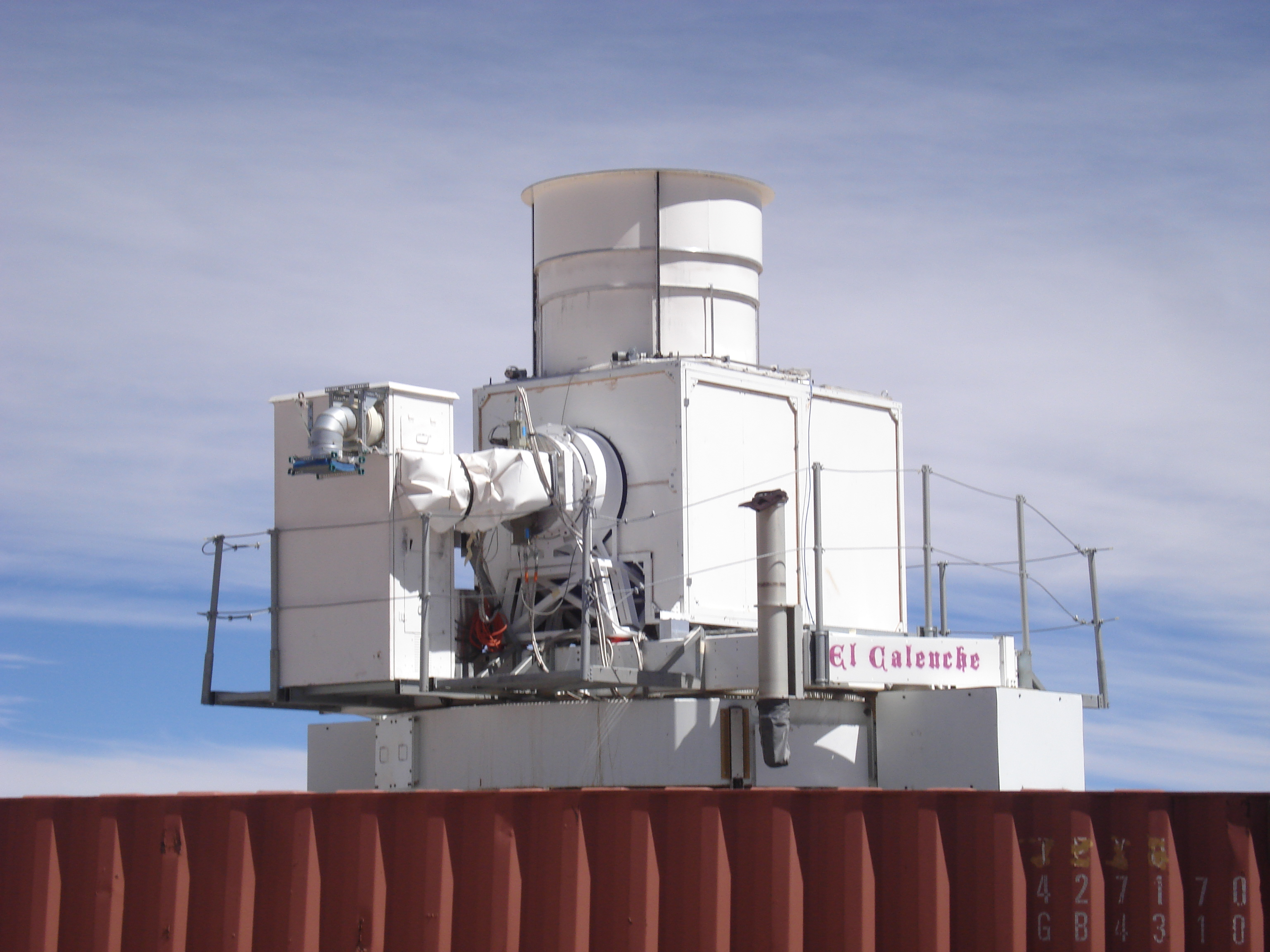
- The QUIET telescope with its ground screen raised
- Alternative names: QUIET
- Location(s): Chile
- Coordinates: 23°01′42″S 67°45′42″W
- Organization: The Kavli Institute for Cosmological Physics; California Institute of Technology; Columbia University; Fermilab; Jet Propulsion Laboratory; KEK; Kavli Institute for Particle Astrophysics and Cosmology; Max Planck Institute for Radio Astronomy; Princeton University; University of Manchester; University of Miami; University of Michigan; University of Oslo; University of Oxford
- Altitude: 5,080 m (16,670 ft)
- Wavelength: 40, 90 GHz (7.5, 3.3 mm)
- Diameter: 2, 7 m (6 ft 7 in, 23 ft 0 in)
- Website: quiet.uchicago.edu
- Location of QUIET
- Related media on Commons

QUIET was an astronomy experiment to study the polarization of the cosmic microwave background radiation. QUIET stands for Q/U Imaging ExperimenT. The Q/U in the name refers to the ability of the telescope to measure the Q and U Stokes parameters simultaneously. QUIET was located at an elevation of 5,080 metres (16,700 feet) at Llano de Chajnantor Observatory in the Chilean Andes. It began observing in late 2008 and finished observing in December 2010.

QUIET was the result of an international collaboration that had its origins in the CAPMAP, Cosmic Background Imager (CBI) and QUaD collaborations. The collaboration consisted of 7 groups in the United States (the California Institute of Technology, the University of Chicago, Columbia University, the Jet Propulsion Laboratory, the University of Miami, Princeton University and Stanford University), 4 groups in Europe (the University of Manchester, the Max-Planck-Institut für Radioastronomie Bonn, the University of Oslo and the University of Oxford) and one group in Japan (KEK; the first time a Japan group has been involved in CMB studies). Other members of the collaboration are from the University of California, Berkeley, the Goddard Space Flight Center and the Center for Astrophysics | Harvard & Smithsonian.

== Instrument ==
QUIET had arrays of detectors at two frequencies: 43 GHz (Q band) and 95 GHz (W band). It used four telescopes, three of which were purpose-built 2 m types with the other being the 7 m Crawford Hill telescope used for CAPMAP. As a result, it had angular resolutions between a few arcminutes and several degrees. The detectors were mass-produced coherent correlation polarimeters.

The instrument was constructed in three phases. The first phase consisted of a 7-element 95 GHz array to demonstrate the technology. The second phase mounted a 91-element 95 GHz array (with 18 GHz bandwidth) and a 19-element 43 GHz array (with 8 GHz bandwidth) on 1.4 m cassegrain telescopes, mounted on what was the CBI platform. It started observing in 2008. The third phase planned four further arrays by 2010. Two of these were at 43 GHz, with 91 elements each, and the other two were at 95 GHz, with 397 elements each. These were mounted on three 2 m dishes on the CBI platform and the 7 m telescope.

The instrument was located at a height of 5,080 m at Llano de Chajnantor Observatory in the Chilean Andes. The site is owned by the Chilean government, and is leased to the Atacama Large Millimeter Array. The site was selected due to the altitude, infrastructure and accessibility, as well as the low humidity of the site, which reduces the contamination of the detected signals by the atmosphere.

== Science ==
QUIET measured the polarization of the cosmic microwave background radiation (CMB). This polarization is commonly split into two components: E-modes, which represent the gradient component, and B-modes, which give the curl component. It is thought that B-modes are formed both from primordial fluctuations due to cosmic inflation, and from gravitational lensing of the CMB. As of 2008, only E-modes have been detected. QUIET aims to detect and characterize the B-modes polarization for the first time, and to provide more accurate measurements of the E-mode polarization.

B-modes are thought to be much fainter than E-modes, as they are formed by higher order effects. The ratio of the E-mode to B-mode polarization is currently unknown, and the minimum detectable value of this can be used as a measure of the sensitivity of a CMB instrument. For QUIET this value is r=0.009, which corresponds to the energy scale of cosmic inflation being around $10^{16}$ GeV.

QUIET's measurements of the CMB's power spectrum were designed to be between the multipoles of about 40 and 2,500, and will be made in a section of the sky known to have low foreground contamination.

=== Results ===
The first season reported on power spectra from over 10000 hours of observation at 43 GHz in the multipole range ℓ = 25–475. The E-mode result was consistent with the standard cosmological model. A B-mode spectrum was not detected. The second season paper included 95 GHz data. Power spectra from ℓ = 25 to 975 were used to constrain the tensor-to-scalar ratio.

== Status ==
As of March 2011, the QUIET team described the status

Observations were made from October 2008 through May 2009 using a 19-element 40 GHz instrument coupled to a 1.4 meter telescope located at the Llano de Chajnantor Observatory in Chile. Observations with a 91-element 90 GHz instrument on the same telescope finished in December 2010. The QUIET instrument has been dismantled from the old CBI mount.

== See also ==
- Lists of telescopes
