= Claire Ellen Max =

Astrophysicist

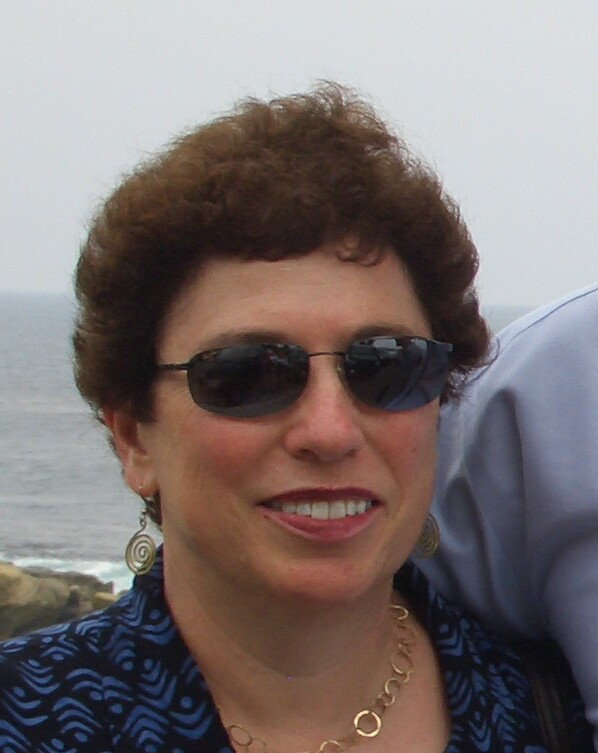
Claire E. Max in 2008

Claire Ellen Max (born September 29, 1946) is a Professor of Astronomy and Astrophysics at the University of California, Santa Cruz (UCSC) and is affiliated with the Lick Observatory. She was the Director of the Center for Adaptive Optics at UCSC, 2007–2014. Max received the E.O. Lawrence Award in Physics.

== Biography ==
In 1972, Max received her Ph.D. in Astrophysical Sciences from Princeton University, following her B.A. degree in Astronomy from Harvard University, in 1968. Following postdoctoral work at the University of California, Berkeley, Max joined the scientific staff of the Lawrence Livermore National Laboratory in 1974, working on problems in plasma physics relating to fusion technology. In 1984, she became the founding Director of the Livermore branch of the UC Institute of Geophysics and Planetary Physics, and in 1995, she became the Director of University Relations. She joined the faculty at UCSC in 2001.

Max is best known for her contributions to the theory of adaptive optics as a technique for reducing the optical distortions of images taken through the turbulent atmosphere. This work began at the JASON Defense Advisory Group, which she joined in 1983 as its first female member. With her colleagues in JASON, she developed the idea of using an artificial laser guide star to correct astronomical images. In addition to continuing to develop this technology at the Center for Adaptive Optics, she uses adaptive optics to study active galactic nuclei as well as planets in the Solar System.

== Awards and honors ==
- Fellow, American Physical Society
- Fellow, American Association for the Advancement of Science
- Fellow, SPIE
- 2002, Fellow of the American Academy of Arts and Sciences
- 2003, Woman of the Year in Science, Alameda County (CA) Women's Hall of Fame
- 2004, E.O. Lawrence Award in Physics, U.S. Department of Energy, for her contributions to the theory of laser adaptive optics and the applications of adaptive optics to ground-based astronomy
- 2005, Hartnell College, Salinas, CA: “President’s Partnership of Excellence” Award
- 2006, Science Award, Chabot Space and Science Center, Oakland CA
- 2008, National Academy of Sciences
- 2009, James Madison Medal, Princeton University
- 2015, Joseph Weber Award for Astronomical Instrumentation, American Astronomical Society
- 2020, Legacy Fellow of the American Astronomical Society.

== See also ==
- List of women in leadership positions on astronomical instrumentation projects
