= Neville C. Luhmann Jr. =

American physicist (1943–2025)

- Born: Neville Clinton Luhmann Jr. March 10, 1943; California, U.S.
- Died: September 5, 2025 (aged 82); Walnut Creek, California, U.S.
- Education: University of California, Berkeley; University of Maryland, College Park
- Occupation: Physicist
- Spouse: Janet Gasior (m. 1970)

Neville Clinton Luhmann Jr. (March 10, 1943 – September 5, 2025) was an American physicist.

== Early life and career ==
Luhmann was born in California on March 10, 1943, the son of Neville Sr. and Katherine Luhmann. He attended the University of California, Berkeley, earning his Bachelor of Science in engineering physics in 1966. He also attended the University of Maryland, College Park, earning his PhD degree in physics in 1972. After earning his degrees, he worked as a postdoctoral fellow at the Princeton Plasma Physics Laboratory.

In 1987, Luhmann was elected as a fellow of the American Physical Society, "for pioneering work in the development of innovative far-infared technology and diagnostics for fusion plasmas and for basic measurements in both laboratory and fusion plasmas". He served as a professor in the department of electrical and computer engineering at the University of California, Davis from 1993 to 2025. During his years as a professor, in 2003, he was named a distinguished professor.

== Personal life and death ==
In 1970, Luhmann married Janet Gasior, a fellow physicist. Their marriage lasted until Luhmann's death in 2025.

Luhmann died in Walnut Creek, California on September 5, 2025, at the age of 82.
