= Belinda Wilkes =

English astrophysicist

Belinda J. Wilkes
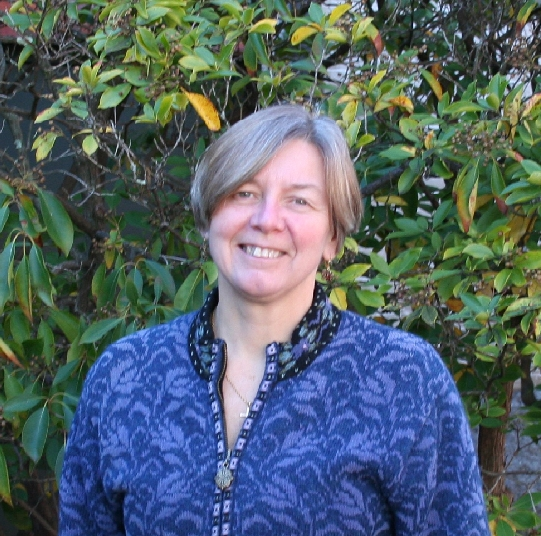
- Wilkes in 2012
- Born: Staffordshire, England
- Education: Wolverhampton Girls' High School, University of St. Andrews, University of Cambridge
- Occupation: Astrophysicist

Belinda Jane Wilkes is a Senior Astrophysicist at the Smithsonian Astrophysical Observatory (SAO) in Cambridge, Massachusetts, US, and former director of the Chandra X-ray Center.

== Education and career ==
She was born in Staffordshire, England and grew up in Albrighton, Shropshire, attending Wolverhampton Girls' High School before obtaining a BSc.(Hons) in Physics and Astronomy at the University of St. Andrews, Scotland followed by a PhD in Astronomy from the University of Cambridge, England. In 1982 she moved to the University of Arizona's Steward Observatory as a NATO postdoctoral fellow and in 1984 to SAO's High Energy Astrophysics Division, part of the Center for Astrophysics | Harvard & Smithsonian.

== Research ==
Her research relates to multi-wavelength studies of quasars: galaxies containing super-massive black holes at their centers and the most luminous sources in the Universe. She is the author of over 165 papers in refereed science journals and has served on a wide range of professional committees as well as various user and advisory committees and review boards for space and ground-based telescopes. She is a Fellow of the Royal Astronomical Society and the Cambridge Philosophical Society, and a member of the International Astronomical Union.

== Recognition ==
In 2018 she was elected an Honorary Fellow of Jesus College, Cambridge, her Alma Mater. In 2020 she was named a fellow of the American Physical Society "for significant contributions to the understanding of active galactic nuclei, including their emission mechanisms and evolutionary pathways, and for innovative leadership of the Chandra X-ray Observatory". In 2021 she was named a fellow of the American Astronomical Society "For dedicated leadership of the astronomical community as director of the Chandra X-ray Center", and was named to the 2021 class of Fellows of the American Association for the Advancement of Science. She was awarded the Richard Glazebrook Medal and Prize for Leadership in Physics for her leadership of the Chandra X-Ray Centre by the Institute of Physics in 2023.

== See also ==
- List of women in leadership positions on astronomical instrumentation projects
