= Julie McEnery =

American astrophysicist

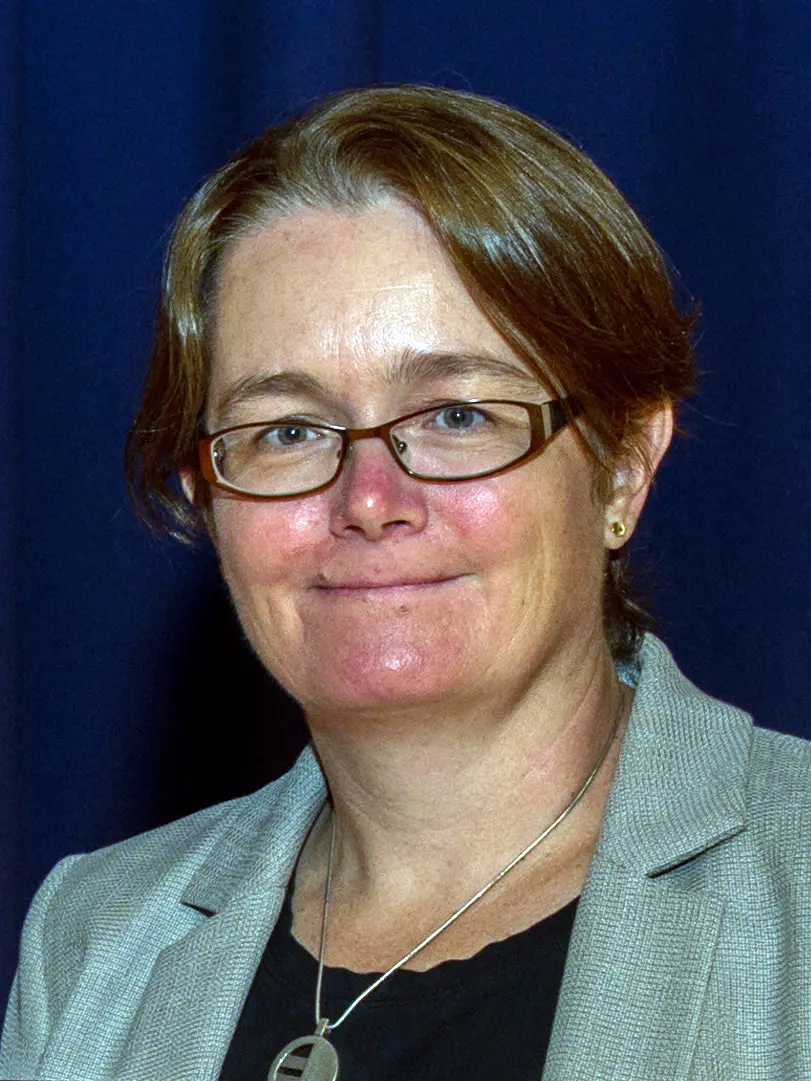
- Education: University College Dublin, Ph.D.
- Awards: Fellow of the American Physical Society
- Scientific career
- Fields: Astrophysics
- Workplaces: Goddard Space Flight Center, University of Maryland, College Park, George Washington University

Julie McEnery is an astrophysicist at the Goddard Space Flight Center where she is the senior project scientist for the Nancy Grace Roman Space Telescope. Until 2020 she was the project scientist for the Fermi Gamma-Ray Space Telescope.

== Biography ==
McEnery received a PhD in Experimental Physics from University College Dublin in 1997. For her PhD, she observed the galaxy Markarian 421. She was elected as a fellow of the American Physical Society in 2011. She is also an adjunct professor of physics at The University of Maryland and George Washington University.

Before working at the Goddard Space Flight Center, McEnery worked on ground based gamma-ray telescopes to detect Cherenkov radiation. She has also worked with the Milagro collaboration on gamma-ray bursts.

In 2018, McEnery was awarded UCD Alumnus of the Year in Research, Innovation & Impact.

University College Dublin dedicates a yearly medal and prize to a student in her honor. This award is given to the student in the universities MSc in Space Science and Technology with the highest cumulative GPA across all program modules and an overall GPA exceeding first class honors

On March 29, 2012, McEnery received an email claiming that the Fermi satellite had a chance to collide with a cold war era satellite named Kosmos 1805 destroying both at the same time. As Kosmos 1805 approached Fermi the operators performed an evasive maneuver using the thrusters preventing the collision. Moments later the Fermi went on to conduct science after the close call.

== See also ==
- List of women in leadership positions on astronomical instrumentation projects
