= Graziella Branduardi-Raymont =

Italian physicist

- Born: Graziella Branduardi
- Scientific career
- Fields: Astronomy; Planetary science
- Workplaces: Center for Astrophysics | Harvard & Smithsonian (1977–1979); University College London Mullard Space Science Laboratory (1979–2023)

Graziella Branduardi-Raymont (6 January 1949 – 3 November 2023) was an Italian physicist. She was a professor at University College London's Mullard Space Science Laboratory (MSSL).

== Biography ==
Branduardi-Raymont obtained a degree in physics from the University of Milan in 1973, and in 1974 began studying for a PhD at University College London's Mullard Space Science Laboratory (MSSL). She finished her PhD in X-ray Astronomy in 1977 and subsequently moved to the Center for Astrophysics | Harvard & Smithsonian.

She returned to MSSL in 1979 as a research assistant before achieving lecturership in 1987 and becoming a reader in astronomy in 1992. During the 1990s she took on the role of MSSL project manager for the digital electronics of the reflection grating spectrometer flying on board ESA's XMM-Newton mission. In 2009, she was appointed professor of space astronomy. At the time of her death, her research was focused on planetary X-ray emission alongside her role as Co-PI for the joint ESA – Chinese Academy of Sciences SMILE mission that successfully launched on 19 May 2026.

=== Research interests ===
Branduardi-Raymont's research interests included:

- X-ray binaries
- X-ray background
- Active galactic nuclei (AGN)
- Planetary X-ray emission

=== Space missions ===
- Co-investigator of the reflection grating spectrometer on the ESA XMM-Newton mission.
- Co-principal investigator of the ESA – CAS SMILE mission.

== See also ==
- List of women in leadership positions on astronomical instrumentation projects
