= FOXSI Sounding Rocket =

Sounding rocket payload

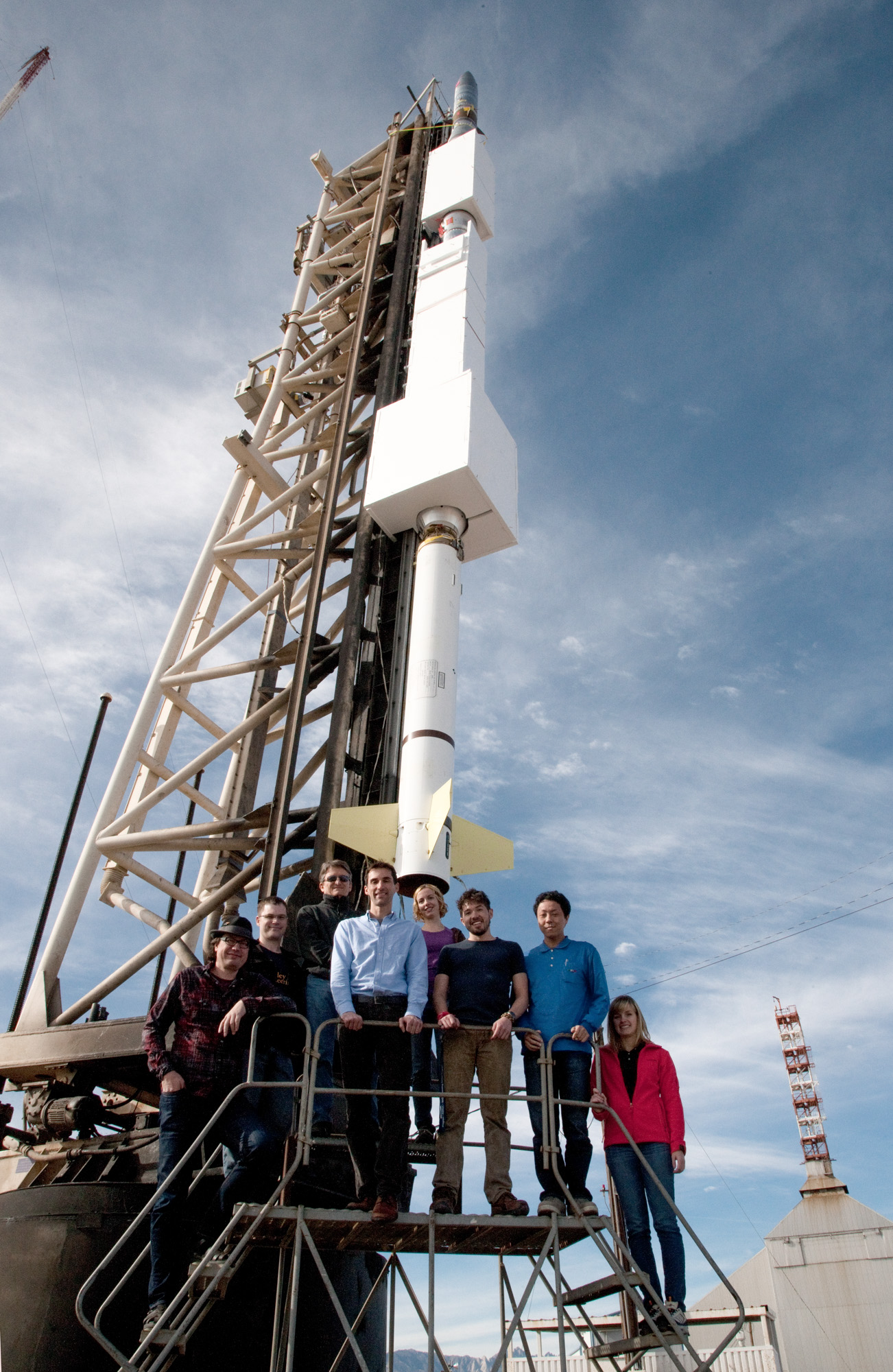
A photograph of the FOXSI team in front of the FOXSI-2 sounding rocket on the launch pad.

The Focusing Optics X-ray Solar Imager, or FOXSI, is a sounding rocket payload built by UC Berkeley and led by Säm Krucker to test high energy grazing-incidence focusing optics paired with solid-state pixelated detectors to observe the Sun. FOXSI is composed of seven identical Wolter-I telescope modules, as well as Silicon and Cadmium Telluride strip detectors originally developed for the HXT telescope on the Japanese Hitomi mission. The FOXSI payload flew two times, most recently in 2014 and previously in 2012, on the Black Brant IX sounding rocket. Like most sounding rockets, FOXSI flew for approximately 15 minutes per mission and observed the Sun for about 5 minutes while in space. During its first flight, FOXSI successfully imaged a solar microflare in the hard x-ray band for the first time.

FOXSI's third mission, led by Lindsay Glesener of the University of Minnesota, had a successful launch on September 7, 2018, from White Sands, New Mexico. This iteration of the payload included a combination of Silicon and improved Cadmium Telluride detectors, as well as one CMOS soft x-ray detector. Two of the telescope modules were updated from 7-shell to 10-shell configurations, and the payload also introduced collimator technology to reduce the impact of singly-reflected rays.

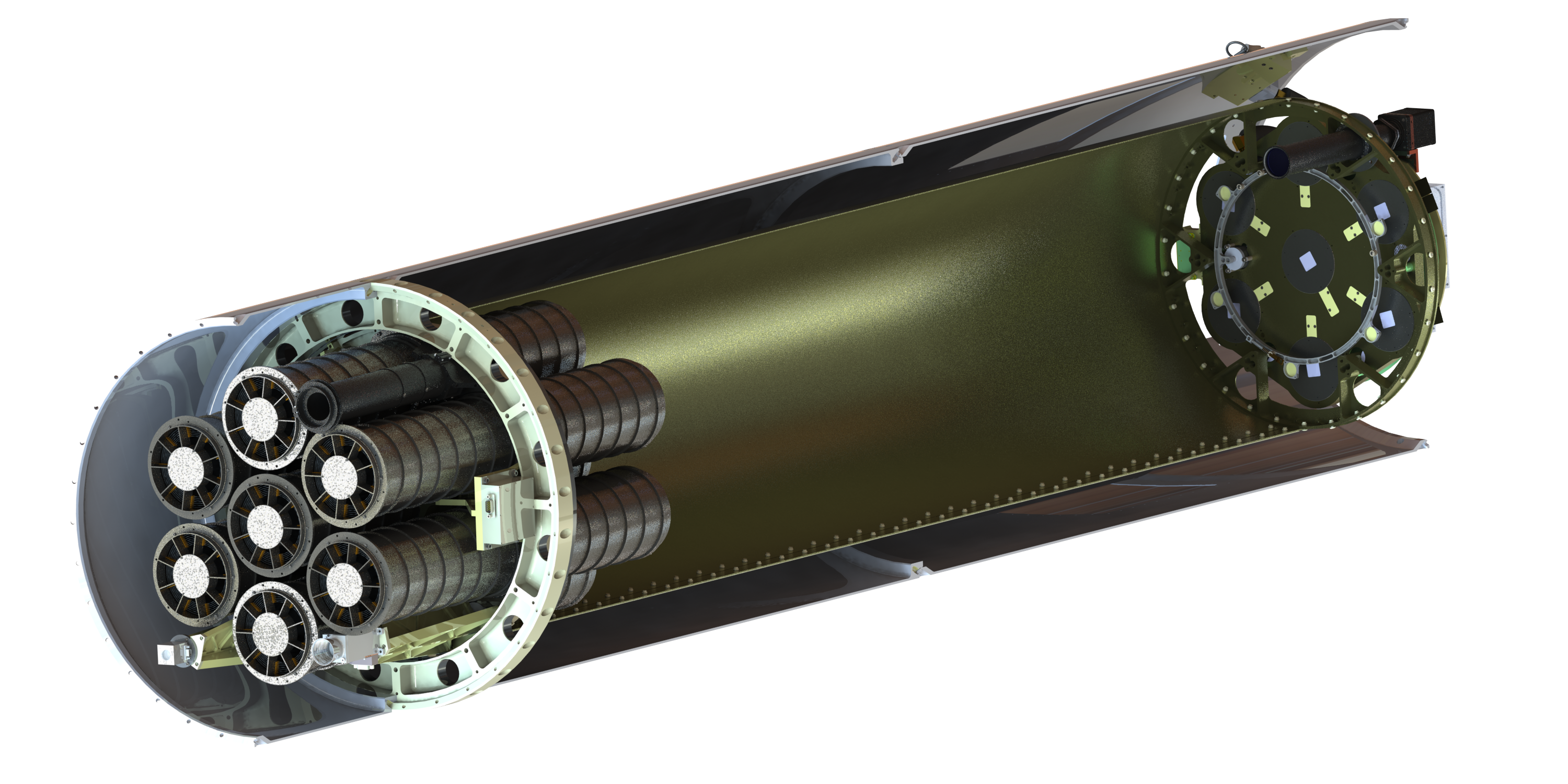
A high resolution render of the FOXSI-2 payload.
