= Sarah Matthews (physicist) =

British physicist

- Born: Sarah Anna Matthews
- Scientific career
- Fields: Astronomy; Solar Physics
- Workplaces: University College London; Mullard Space Science Laboratory (1996–present)

Sarah Anna Matthews is a British physicist. She is professor and head of solar physics at University College London's Mullard Space Science Laboratory (MSSL). She is also chairperson of UK Solar Physics.

== Biography ==
Born in London, Matthews graduated from the University of Glasgow with a first class honours BSc in 1992, and remained in Glasgow to undertake a PhD in the study of solar flares under the supervision of John Campbell Brown. After being awarded her doctorate in 1996, she joined MSSL to work on the Solar and Heliospheric Observatory mission. She has remained a member of the Laboratory's solar physics group ever since, advancing from a lectureship and a readership to her current professorial chair. She is also the Director of Education and the programme director of the MSc course in Space Science and Engineering at MSSL's parent institution, University College London.

=== Research interests ===
Matthews has a wide range of research interests within the field of solar physics. These include -

- Storage and release of energy in magnetic fields within the solar atmosphere.
- Active region structure and evolution.
- Initiation and evolution of solar flares and coronal mass ejections.
- Formation mechanisms of sunquakes.
- Acceleration of solar energetic particles and space weather.
- Ground and space-based instrumentation for remote sensing observations.

=== Space missions ===
- Principal investigator of the EUV Imaging Spectrometer (EIS) on board the Hinode spacecraft.
- Co-investigator of EUV Imager (EUI) and EUV spectrometer (SPICE) on board the Solar Orbiter spacecraft

=== Awards ===
- 2020: James Dungey Lecturer

== See also ==
- List of women in leadership positions on astronomical instrumentation projects
