= Lindsay Glesener =

American astrophysicist

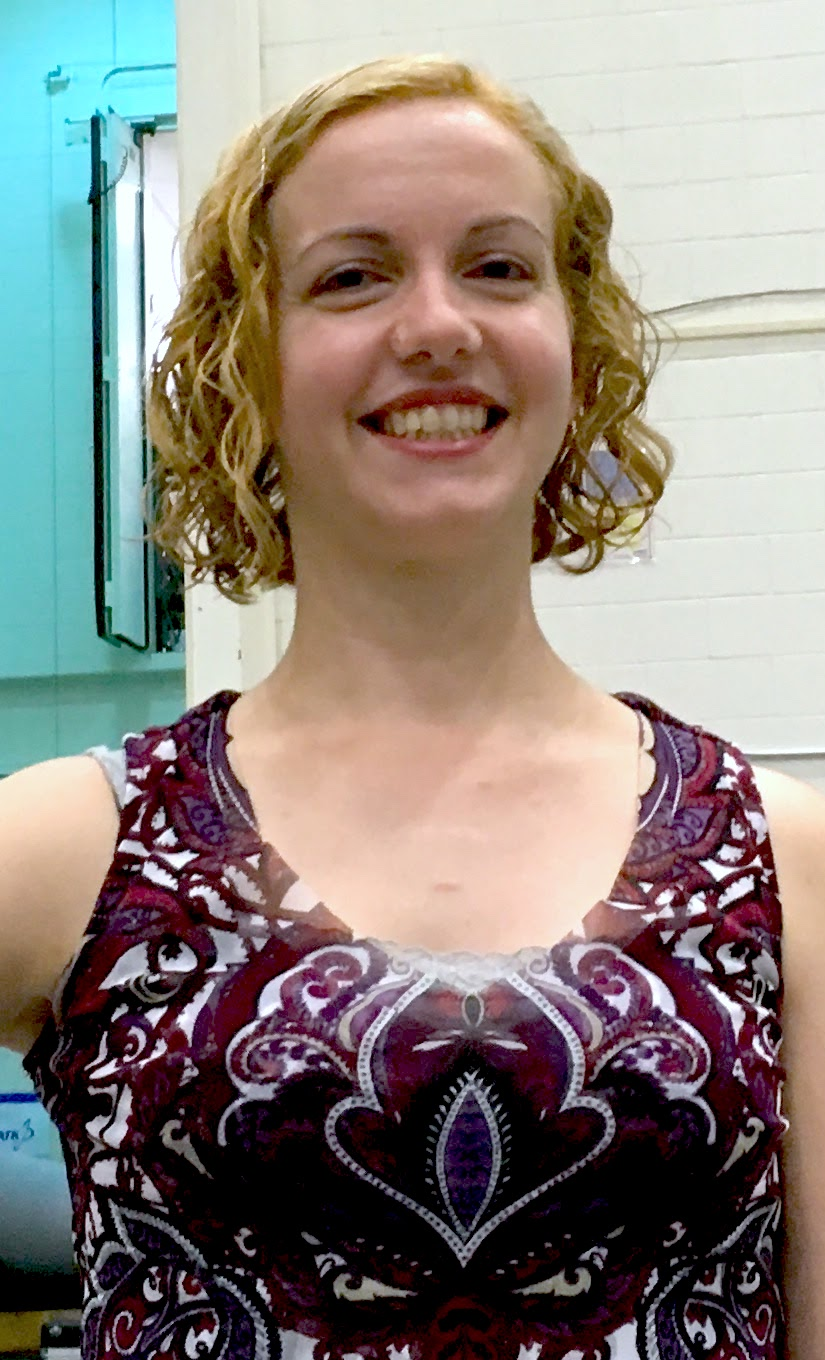
- Glesener in 2016
- Education: San Francisco State University; University of California, Berkeley
- Scientific career
- Workplaces: University of Minnesota
- Thesis: Faint Coronal Hard X-rays From Accelerated Electrons in Solar Flares (2012)

Lindsay Erin Glesener is a professor in the Institute for Astrophysics at the University of Minnesota . She is a National Science Foundation CAREER Award researcher and lead investigator on the FOXSI Sounding Rocket.

== Early life and education ==
Glesener grew up near Lake Superior. After Glesener graduated from high school she worked briefly as a ballet dancer. Glesener completed her bachelor's degree at San Francisco State University, graduating in 2006. She joined the University of California, Berkeley for her graduate studies, earning a Masters in 2009 and a PhD in 2012. Her thesis, Faint Coronal Hard X-rays From Accelerated Electrons in Solar Flares, was supervised by Robert Lin and Säm Krucker. Whilst a PhD student she wrote for the Berkeley Science Review. For her thesis she was awarded the Tomkins Instrumentation Thesis Prize from the Royal Astronomical Society. Her graduate work focussed on building a payload known as the FOXSI Sounding Rocket.

== Research ==
She worked as a postdoctoral researcher at the University of California, Berkeley for two years before joining the University of Minnesota in 2014. She was promoted to assistant professor in 2015. She was awarded a National Science Foundation grant to expand the School of Physics and Astronomy of the University of Minnesota.

Glesener is the PI of the FOXSI Sounding Rocket. FOXSI detects Hard X-rays which are a signature of extraordinarily hot solar material. The rocket payload flew in 2014, using a Solar Aspect and Alignment System and Hard X-rays Spectroscopy to obtain focussed images of the sun. She also works on small CubeSats. In 2017 Glesener identified that nanoflares (small explosions) in the plasma of the sun may cause the scalding temperatures in the solar corona.

In 2018 she was awarded an NSF Career Award, allowing her to link high-energy solar and astrophysics. FOXSI 3 launched on August 21, 2018. Glesener wants to identify how particles are accelerated in the most high-energy events that occur in the sun, including explosions, flares and plasma ejections.

Glesener has given invited talks at academic conferences and colleges. She is on the Solar Physics Division committee of the American Astronomical Society.

== See also ==
- List of women in leadership positions on astronomical instrumentation projects
