= Gemini Observatory =

Astronomical observatory in Hawaii, US

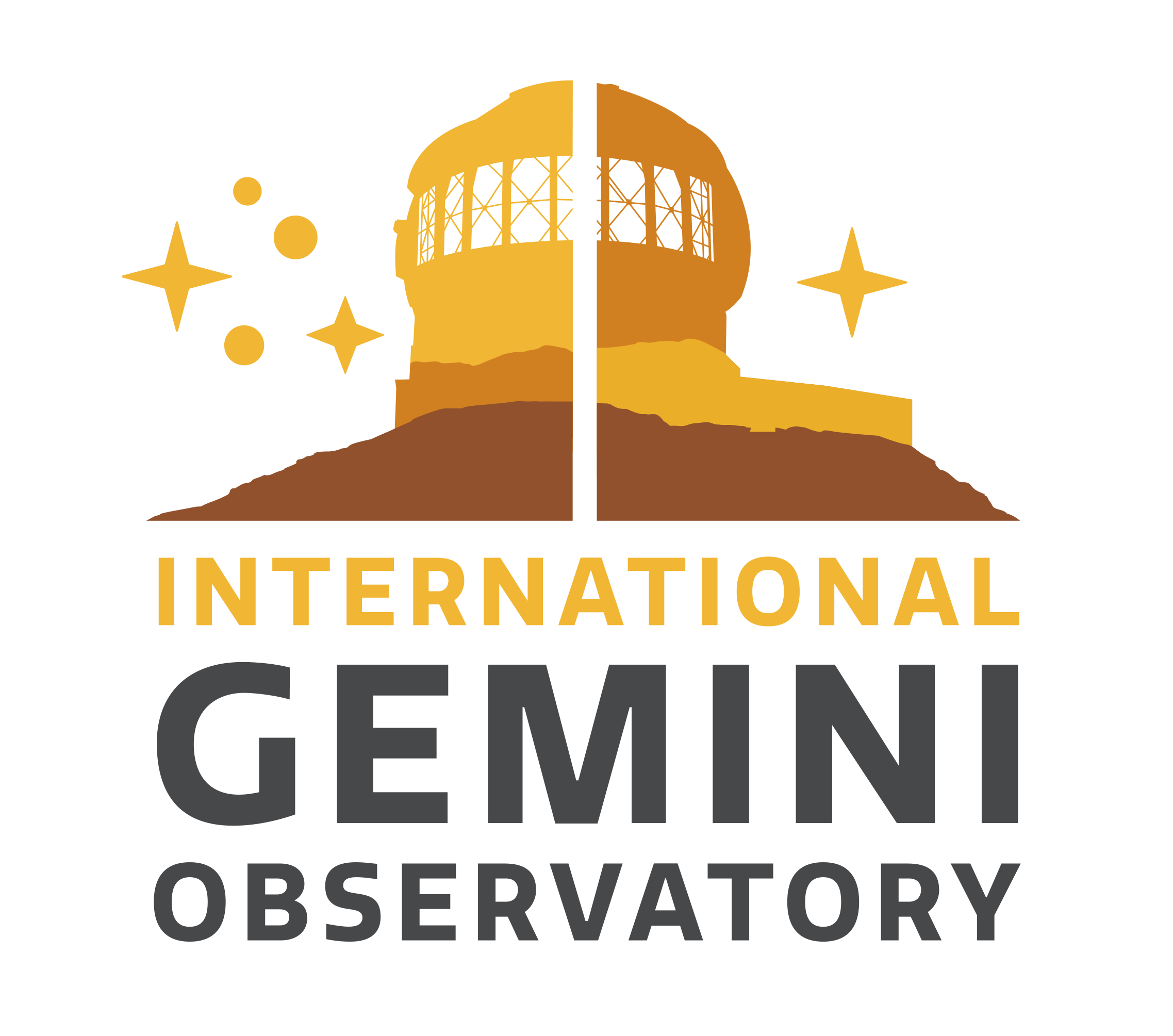

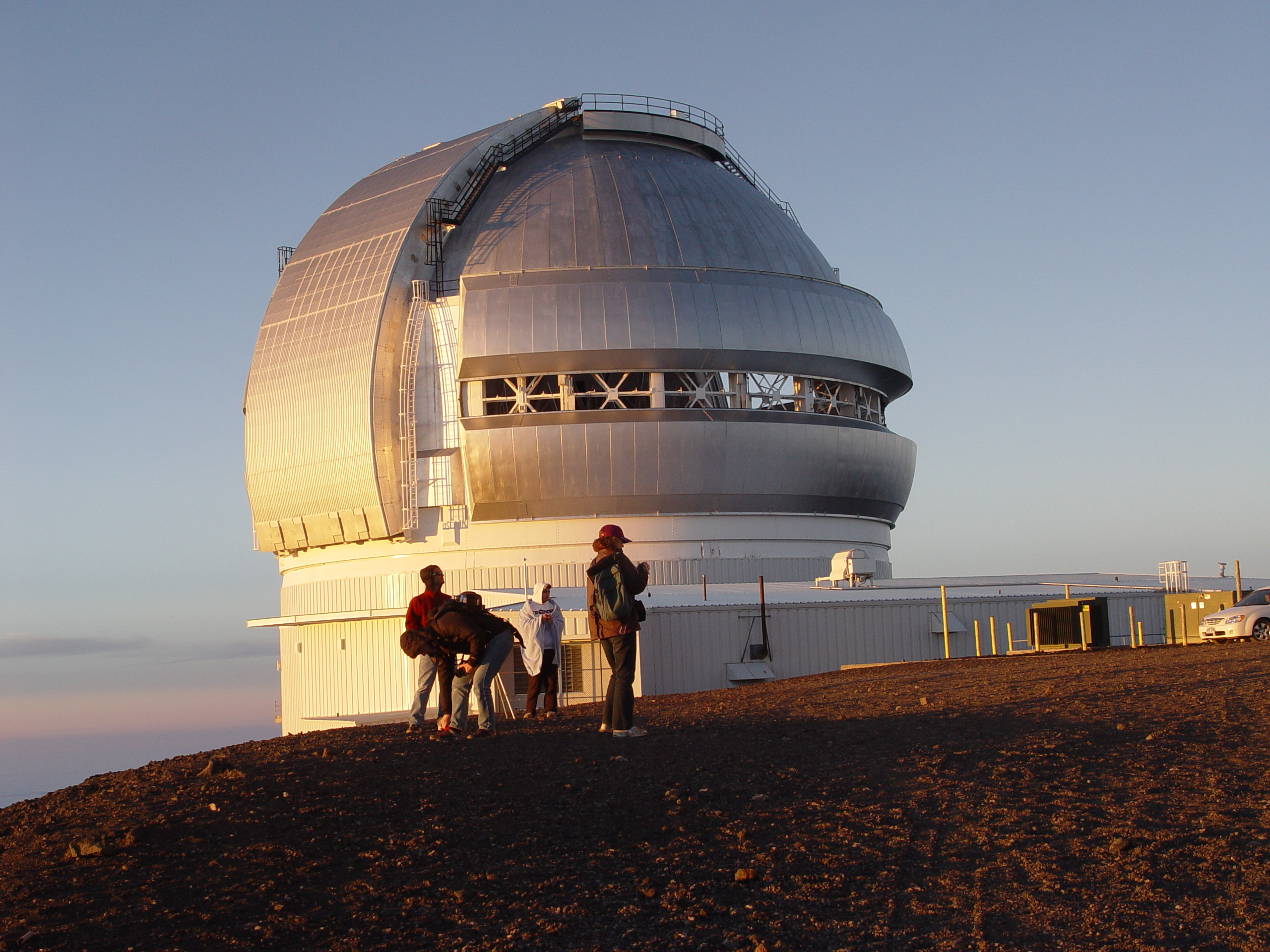
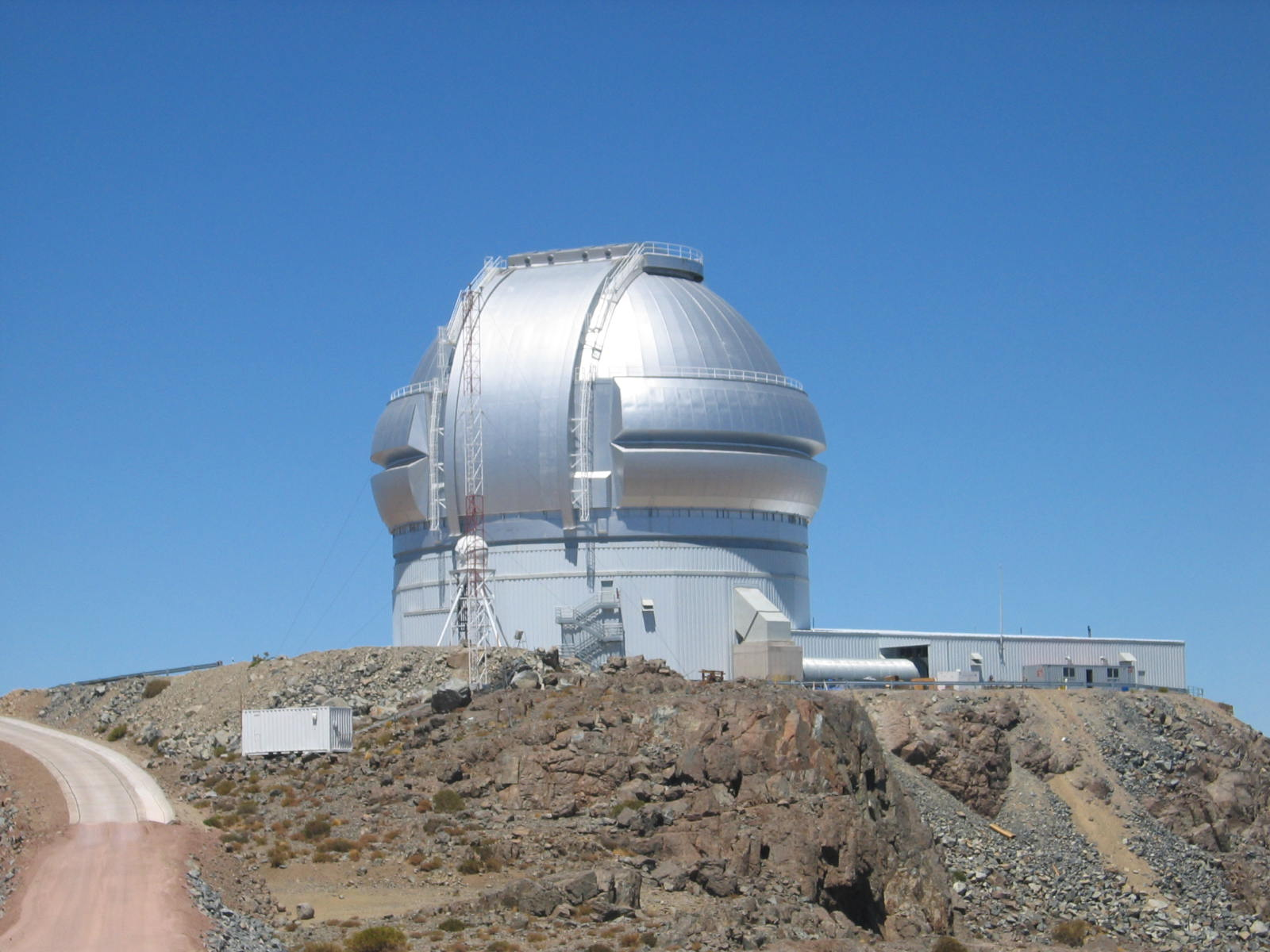
- Gemini North in Hawaii and Gemini South in Chile
- Alternative names: International Gemini Observatory
- Named after: Gemini
- Organization: Gemini Consortium (NSF-US, NRC-Canada, CONICYT-Chile, MCTI-Brazil, MCTIP-Argentina, KASI-Korea) and AURA
- Location: Mauna Kea Access Rd, Hawaii, U.S. Cerro Pachón, Chile
- Coordinates: 19.82396°N 155.46984°W; 30.24073°S 70.73659°W
- Altitude: 4,213, 2,722 m (13,822, 8,930 ft)
- Established: 1999
- Website: www.gemini.edu

Telescopes
- Gemini North: 8.1 m Cassegrain reflector
- Gemini South: 8.1 m Cassegrain reflector
- Location within Hawaii
- Related media on Commons

The Gemini Observatory comprises two 8.1-metre (26.6 ft) telescopes, Gemini North and Gemini South, situated in Hawaii and Chile, respectively. These twin telescopes offer extensive coverage of the northern and southern skies and rank among the most advanced optical/infrared telescopes available to astronomers. (See List of largest optical reflecting telescopes).

The observatory is owned and operated by the National Science Foundation (NSF) of the United States, the National Research Council of Canada, CONICYT of Chile, MCTI of Brazil, MCTIP of Argentina, and Korea Astronomy and Space Science Institute (KASI) of Republic of Korea. The NSF is the primary funding contributor, providing about 70% of the required resources. The Association of Universities for Research in Astronomy (AURA) manages the operations and maintenance of the observatory through a cooperative agreement with the NSF, acting as the Executive Agency on behalf of the international partners. NSF's NOIRLab is the US national center for ground-based, nighttime optical astronomy and operates Gemini as one of its programs.

The Gemini telescopes are equipped with modern instruments and excel in optical and near-infrared performance. They utilize adaptive optics technology to counteract atmospheric blurring. Notably, Gemini leads in wide-field adaptive optics assisted infrared imaging and has recently commissioned the Gemini Planet Imager, enabling researchers to directly observe and study exoplanets with extreme faintness compared to their host stars. Gemini supports research across various domains of modern astronomy, including the Solar System, exoplanets, star formation and evolution, galaxy structure and dynamics, supermassive black holes, distant quasars, and the structure of the Universe on large scales.

Previously, Australia and the United Kingdom were also involved in the Gemini Observatory partnership. However, the UK withdrew its funding at the end of 2012. In response, the observatory has significantly reduced operating costs, streamlined operations, and implemented energy-saving measures at both sites. Additionally, both telescopes are now operated remotely from Base Facility Operations centers located in Hilo, Hawaii, and La Serena, Chile. In 2018, KASI has signed an agreement to become a full participant of the Gemini Observatory.

== Overview ==
The Gemini Observatory's international Headquarters and Northern Operations Center is located in Hilo, Hawaii at the University of Hawaii at Hilo University Park. The Southern Operations Center is located on the Cerro Tololo Inter-American Observatory (CTIO) campus near La Serena, Chile.

- The "Gemini North" telescope (also known as 'Alopeke), officially called the Frederick C. Gillett Gemini Telescope is located on Hawaii's Mauna Kea, along with many other telescopes. That location provides excellent viewing conditions due to the superb atmospheric conditions (stable, dry, and rarely cloudy) above the 4,200-metre-high (13,800 ft) dormant volcano. It saw first light in 1999 and began scientific operations in 2000.

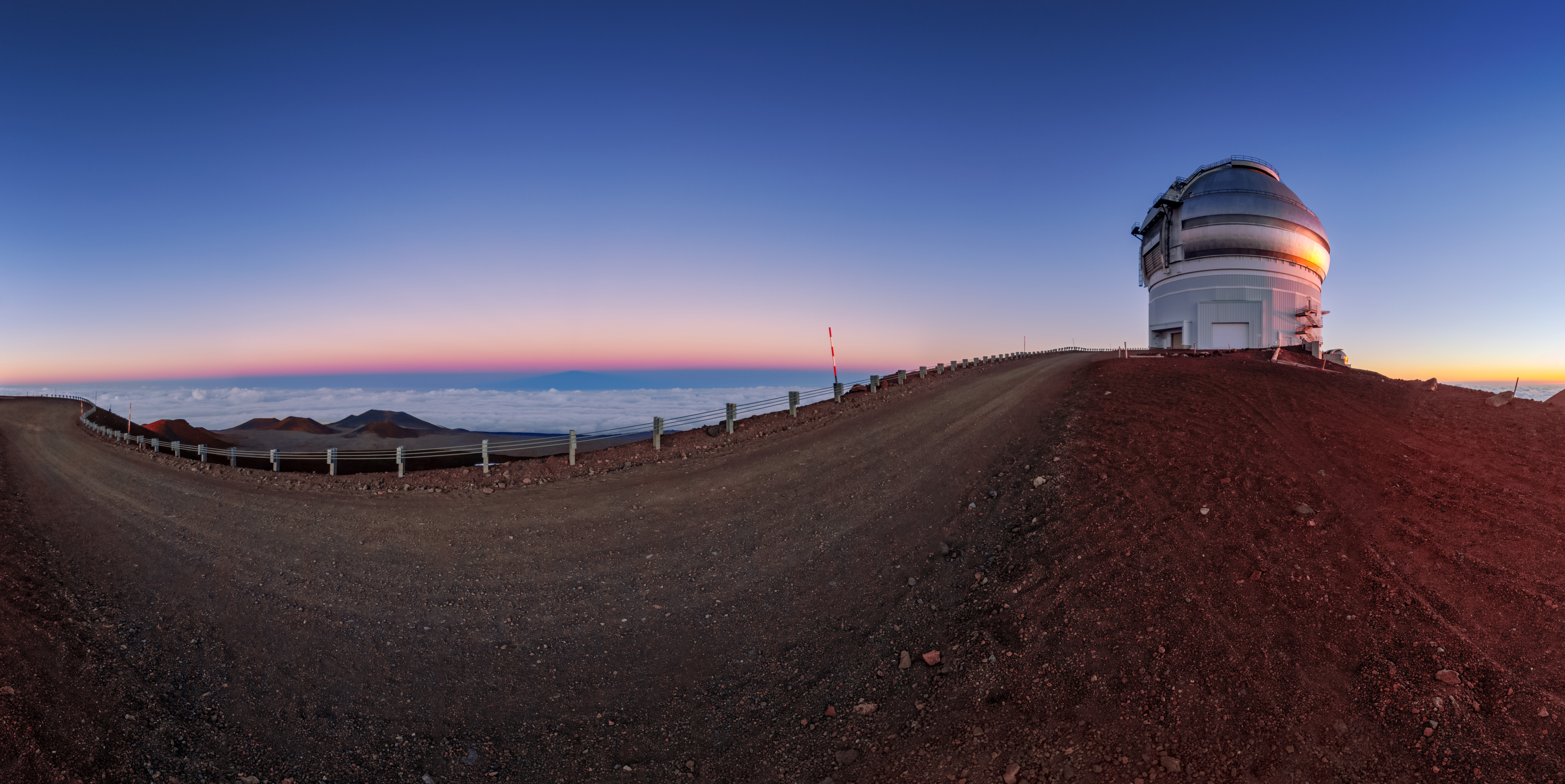
Gemini North on the summit of Hawaii's Mauna Kea

- The "Gemini South" telescope (also known as Zorro) is located at over 2,700 metres (8,900 ft) elevation on a mountain in the Chilean Andes called Cerro Pachón. Very dry air and negligible cloud cover make this another prime telescope location (again shared by several other observatories, including the Southern Astrophysical Research Telescope (SOAR) and Cerro Tololo Inter-American Observatory). Gemini South saw first light in 2000.

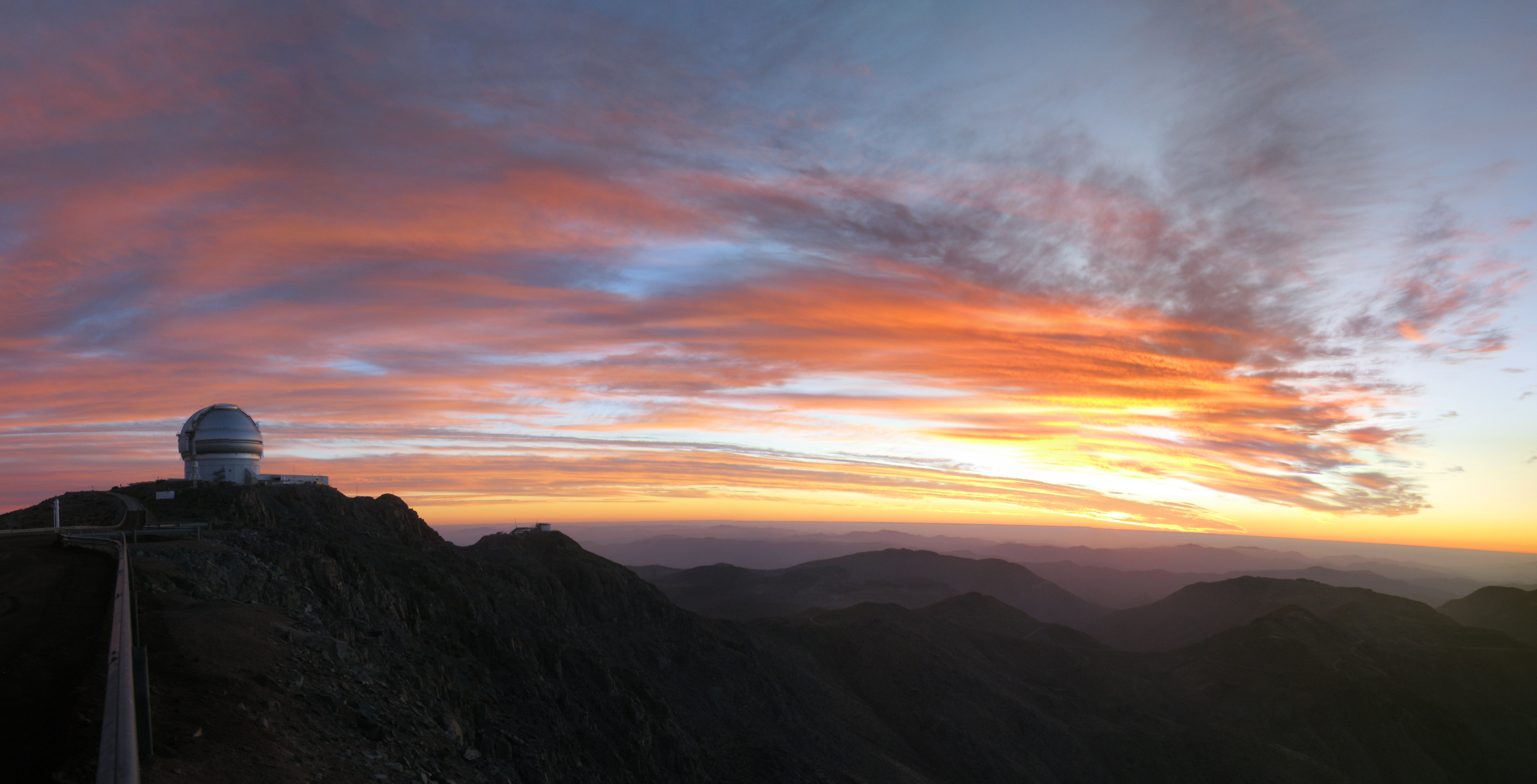
Gemini South, on Cerro Pachón in the Chilean Andes

Together, the two telescopes cover almost all of the sky except for two areas near the celestial poles: Gemini North cannot point north of declination +89 degrees, and Gemini South cannot point south of declination −89 degrees.

Both Gemini telescopes employ a range of technologies to provide world-leading performance in optical and near-infrared astronomy, including laser guide stars, adaptive optics, multi conjugate adaptive optics, and multi-object spectroscopy. In addition, very high-quality infrared observations are possible due to the advanced protected silver coating applied to each telescope's mirrors, the small secondary mirrors in use (resulting in an f16 focal ratio), and the advanced ventilation systems installed at each site.

== History ==
It is estimated that the two telescopes cost approximately US$187 million to construct, and a night on each Gemini telescope is worth tens of thousands of U.S. dollars.

The two 8-meter mirror blanks, each weighing over 22 t (24 short tons), were fabricated from Corning's Ultra Low Expansion glass. Each blank was constructed by the fusing together of and subsequent sagging of a series of smaller hexagonal pieces. This work was performed at Corning's Canton Plant facility located in upstate New York. The blanks were then transported via ship to REOSC, located south of Paris for final grinding and polishing.

One decision made during design to save money was eliminating the two Nasmyth platforms. This makes instruments like high resolution spectrographs and adaptive optics systems much more difficult to construct, due to the size and mass requirement inherent with Cassegrain instruments. A further challenge in designing large instruments is the requirement to have a specific mass and center-of-mass position to maintain the overall balance of the telescope.

=== UK funding crisis ===
In November 2007 it was announced that the UK's Science and Technology Facilities Council (STFC) had proposed that, to save £4 million annually, it would aim to leave the telescope's operating consortium. At a consortium meeting in January 2008, the conclusion was made that the UK would officially withdraw from the Gemini Partnership and the Gemini Observatory Agreement effective February 28, 2007. This decision significantly disrupted observatory budgets, and resulted in the cancellation of at least one instrument in development at that time, the Precision Radial Velocity Spectrograph.

Since the reason for the UK breaking its part of the agreement seemed to be entirely financial, there was public outcry, including the "Save Astronomy" movement which asked citizens to speak up against the astronomy budget cuts. The UK rethought their decision to withdraw from Gemini, and requested reinstatement into the agreement, and were officially welcomed back on February 27, 2008. However, in December 2009 it was announced that the UK would indeed leave the Gemini partnership in 2012, as well as terminating several other international science partnerships, due to continuing funding limitations.

== Directorship ==
The first director of Gemini was Matt Mountain, who after holding the post for eleven years left in September 2005 to become director of the Space Telescope Science Institute (STScI). He was succeeded by Jean-René Roy, who served for nine months, after which time Doug Simons held the directorship from June 2006 to May 2011. He in turn was succeeded by an interim appointment of the then-retired Fred Chaffee, former director of W. M. Keck Observatory. Chaffee was succeeded in August 2012 by Markus Kissler-Patig, who held the post until June 2017. Laura Ferrarese succeeded Kissler-Patig in July 2017 with an interim appointment. Jennifer Lotz took over as the directory on September 6, 2018, but left in 2024 to begin a 5 year appointment as Director of STScI. She was replaced by Scott Dahm as an interim director in January 2024.

== Governance and oversight ==
The Observatory is governed by the Gemini Board, as defined by the Gemini International Agreement. The Board sets budgetary policy bounds for the Observatory and carries out broad oversight functions, with advice from a Science and Technology Advisory sub-Committee (the STAC) and a Finance sub-Committee. The U.S. holds six of the 13 voting seats on the Gemini Board. The U.S. members of the Board typically serve three year terms and are recruited and nominated by the National Science Foundation (NSF), which represents the US community in all aspects of Gemini operations and development. Gemini is currently managed by the Association of Universities for Research in Astronomy (AURA), Inc., on behalf of the partnership through an award from NSF. AURA has operated Gemini since its construction in the 1990s.

NSF serves as the Executive Agency and acts on behalf of the international participants. NSF has one seat on the Gemini Board; an additional NSF staff member serves as the Executive Secretary to the board. Programmatic management is the responsibility of an NSF Program Officer. The Program Officer monitors operations and development activities at the Observatory, nominates U.S. scientists to Gemini advisory committees, conducts reviews on behalf of the partnership, and approves funding actions, reports, and contracts.

== Instrumentation ==
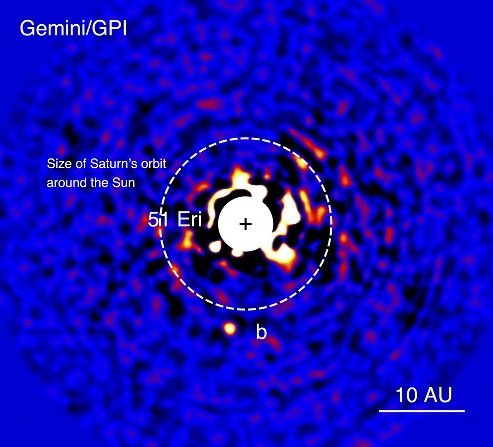
Gemini Planet Imager (GPI) image of a planet orbiting a distant star known as 51 Eridani. The bright central star has been mostly removed by a hardware and software mask to enable the detection of the exoplanet (labelled "b") that is one millionth as bright.

=== Adaptive optics ===
Both Gemini telescopes employ sophisticated state-of-the-art adaptive optics systems. Gemini-N routinely uses the ALTAIR system, built in Canada, which achieves a 30–45% Strehl ratio on a 22.5-arcsecond-square field and can feed NIRI, NIFS or GNIRS; it can use natural or laser guide stars. In conjunction with NIRI it was responsible for the discovery of HR8799b.

At Gemini-S the Gemini Multi-Conjugate Adaptive Optics System (GeMS) may be used with the FLAMINGOS-2 near-infrared imager and spectrometry, or the Gemini South Adaptive Optics Imager (GSAOI), which provides uniform, diffraction-limited image quality to arcminute-scale fields of view. GeMS achieved first light on December 16, 2011. Using a constellation of five laser guide stars, it achieved FWHM of 0.08 arc-seconds in H band over a field of 87 arc-seconds square.

An adaptive secondary mirror has been considered for Gemini, which would provide reasonable adaptive-optics corrections (equivalent to natural seeing at the 20th-percentile level for 80% of the time) to all instruments on the telescope to which it is attached. However, as of 2017, there are no plans to implement such an upgrade to either telescope.

=== Instruments ===
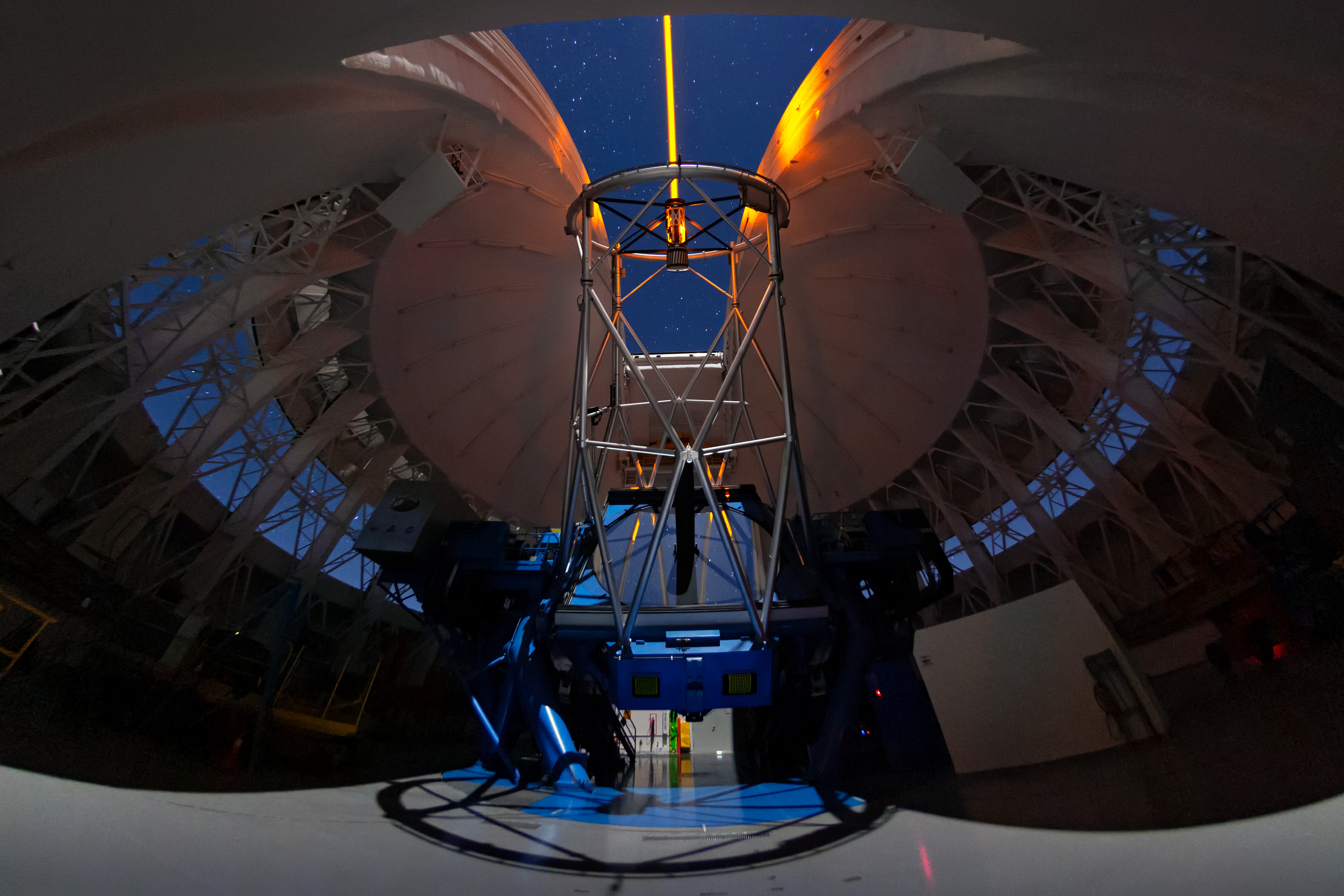
Laser projects a laser guide star (LGS) on Gemini South, part of the adaptive optics system used to correct for distortions caused by turbulence in the atmosphere

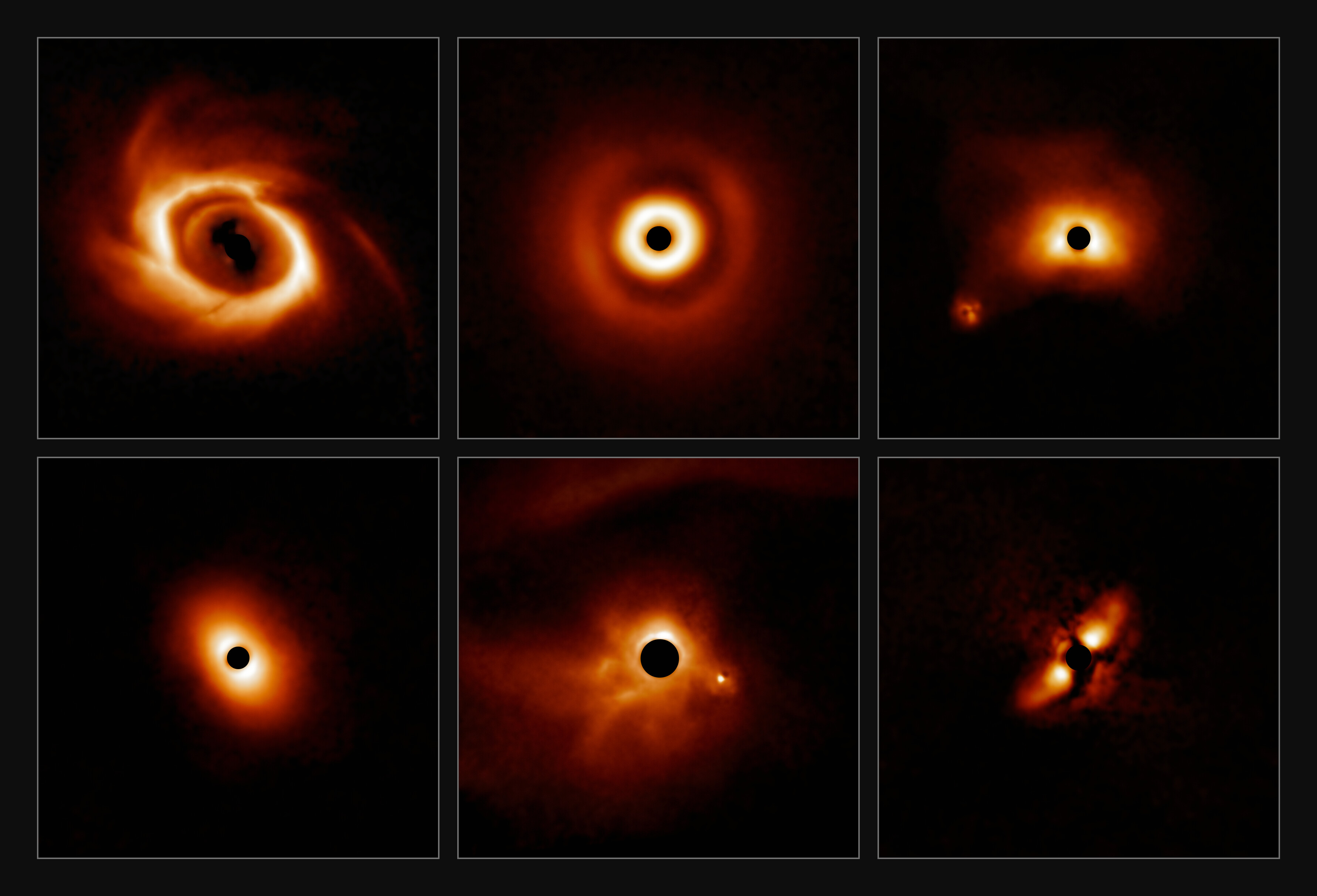
Mosaic of a sample of disks found in new survey

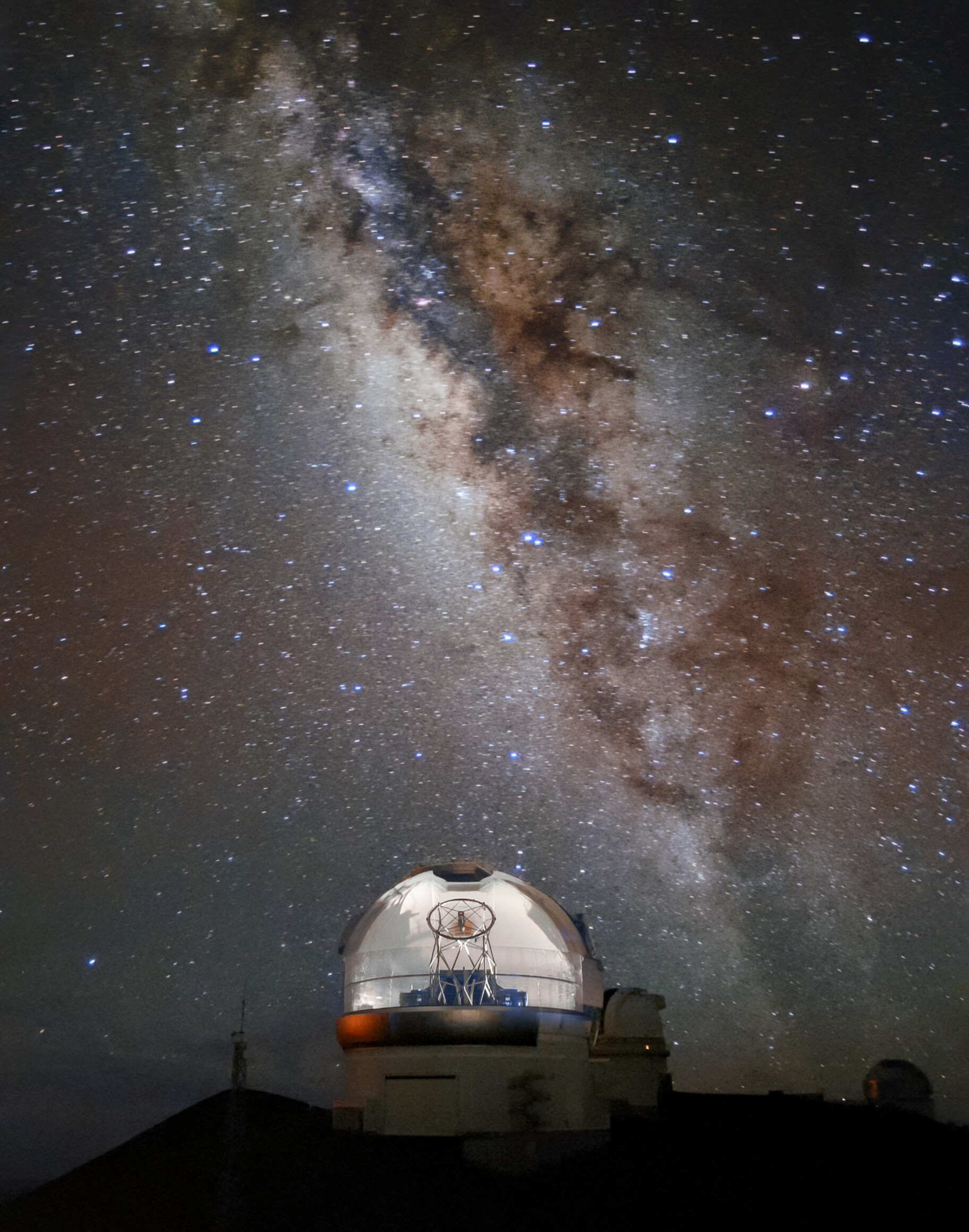
Under the Dome

In recent years the Gemini Board has directed the observatory to support only four instruments at each telescope. Because Gemini-N and Gemini-S are essentially identical, the observatory is able to move instruments between the two sites, and does so on a regular basis. Two of the most popular instruments are the Gemini Multi-Object Spectrographs (GMOS) on each of the telescopes. Built in Edinburgh, Scotland by the UK Astronomy Technology Centre, these instruments provide multi-object spectroscopy, long-slit spectroscopy, imaging, and integral field spectroscopy at optical wavelengths. The detectors in each instrument have recently been upgraded with Hamamatsu Photonics devices, which significantly improve performance in the far red part of the optical spectrum (700–1,000 nm).

Near-infrared imaging and spectroscopy are provided by the NIRI, NIFS, GNIRS, FLAMINGOS-2, and GSAOI instruments. The availability and detailed descriptions of these instruments is documented on the Gemini Observatory Web site.

One of the most exciting new instruments at Gemini is GPI, the Gemini Planet Imager. GPI was built by a consortium of US and Canadian institutions to fulfill the requirements of the ExAOC Extreme Adaptive Optics Coronagraph proposal. GPI is an extreme adaptive-optics imaging polarimeter/integral-field spectrometer, which provides diffraction-limited data between 0.9 and 2.4 microns. GPI is able to directly image planets around nearby stars that are one-millionth as bright as their host star.

Gemini also supports a vigorous visitor instrument program. Instruments may be brought to either telescope for short periods of time and used for specific observing programs by the instrument teams. In return for access to Gemini, the instruments are then made available to the entire Gemini community, so that they may be used for other science projects. Instruments that have made use of this program include the Differential Speckle Survey Instrument (DSSI), the Phoenix near-infrared echelle spectrometer, and the TEXES mid-infrared spectrometer. The ESPaDOnS spectrograph situated in the basement of the Canada–France–Hawaii Telescope (CFHT) is also being used as a "visitor instrument", even though it never moves from CFHT. The instrument is connected to Gemini-North via a 270-meter-long optic fibre. Known as GRACES, this arrangement provides very-high-resolution optical spectroscopy on an 8-meter-class telescope.

Gemini's silver coating and infrared optimization allow sensitive observations in the mid-infrared part of the spectrum (5–27 μm). Historically, mid-infrared observations have been obtained using T-ReCS at Gemini South and Michelle at Gemini North. Both instruments have imaging and spectroscopic capabilities, though neither is currently being used at Gemini.

=== Instrumentation development issues ===
The first phase of Gemini instrumentation development did not run smoothly; schedules slipped by several years, and budgets sometimes overran by as much as a factor of two. In 2003 the instrument-development process was re-analysed in the Aspen report; for example, an incentive program was introduced where instrument developers were guaranteed substantial allocations of telescope time if they delivered the instrument on time and lose it as the instrument is delayed.

A wide-field multi-object spectrograph achieved substantial scientific support, but would have required major changes to the design of the telescope – effectively it would have required one of the telescopes to be devoted to that instrument. The project was terminated in 2009.

=== Second-round instrumentation development ===
In January 2012, the Gemini Observatory started a new round of instrumentation development. This process has since resulted in the development of a high-resolution optical spectrograph known as GHOST, with commissioning beginning in April 2022 and on-sky science commissioning planned for June 2022.

== Observing and community support ==
The Gemini Observatory's primary mission is to serve the general astronomical communities in all of the participant countries; indeed, the Observatory provides the bulk of general access to large optical/infrared telescopes for many of the participants, and represents the only public-access 8-meter-class facility in the US. The observatory reaches out to its community through National Gemini Offices (NGOs), the US office being located in Tucson at the National Optical Astronomy Observatory. The NGOs provide general support to the users, from proposal preparation through data acquisition, reduction, and analysis.

In any given year, the two telescopes typically provided data for over 400 discrete science projects, over two-thirds of which are led by US astronomers. About 50–70% of the top-ranked "Band 1" proposals reach 100% completion in any given year. Of order 90% of the available (clear-weather) time is used for science, the rest being allocated to scheduled maintenance or lost to unforeseen technical faults.

Gemini has in recent years developed innovative new observing modes. These include the "Large and Long" program to support requests for large amounts of telescope time and the "Fast Turnaround" program to provide quick access to the telescope. These and other modes have been approved by the Gemini Board of Directors and are proving popular with the user community. In 2015, up to 20% of available telescope time was used for Large and Long programs, which in terms of hours of observing attracted five times more user demand than could be accommodated. In the same period, approximately 10% of telescope time was assigned to the Fast Turnaround program, which in the second half of 2015 was over-subscribed by a factor of 1.6. In 2015, the remaining US time allocation on Gemini was over-subscribed by a factor of approximately 2, consistent with recent years.

== Prospects (2017 onwards) ==
In 2010, the U.S. National Research Council (NRC) conducted its sixth decadal survey in astronomy and astrophysics to recommend key science questions and new initiatives for the current decade. Since both the NRC recommendations and current programs could not be accommodated within subsequent budget projections, the National Science Foundation's Division of Astronomical Sciences, through the Advisory Committee of the Directorate for Mathematical and Physical Sciences (MPS), conducted a community-based portfolio review to make implementation recommendations that would best respond to the decadal survey science questions. The resulting report, Advancing Astronomy in the Coming Decade: Opportunities and Challenges, was released in August 2012 and included recommendations related to all of the major telescope facilities funded by NSF. The Portfolio Review Committee report ranked Gemini Observatory as a critical component of the U.S.'s future astronomical research resources and recommended that the U.S. retain a majority share in the international partnership for at least the next several years. However, given the constraints that were considered, the Committee recommended that the U.S. contribution to Gemini operations be capped in 2017 and beyond.

NSF has since commissioned a National Research Council study, titled "A Strategy to Optimize the U.S. Optical/Infrared System in the Era of the Large Synoptic Survey Telescope". The report made a recommendation that NSF work with its partners in Gemini to ensure that Gemini-South is well positioned for faint-object spectroscopy early in the era of the Large Synoptic Survey Telescope (LSST). Observatory support for the development of a next-generation medium-resolution spectrograph over the next 5–6 years addresses this recommendation directly.

With the signing of the new International Agreement in late 2015, support from the five signatories (the U.S., Canada, Argentina, Brazil, and Chile) is secured for the period 2016–2021. Australia withdrew from the Gemini Observatory partnership in 2015, and Korea has joined the partnership in 2018. The currently effective International Agreement signed in 2020 November has the six signatories (Argentina, Brazil, Canada, Chile, Korea, and the US), and the Agreement is effective till the end of 2026.

== Observations and research ==
The Gemini was one of the telescopes that observed the turn-on of a nuclear transient, along with the Swift space telescope (aka Neil Gehrels Swift Observatory since 2018) and the Hiltner telescope (MDM observatory). The transient event was called PS1-13cbe and was located in the Galaxy SDSS J222153.87+003054.2

== Incidents ==
On 22 October 2022, the 8.1m primary mirror of the Gemini North telescope was damaged when it touched an earthquake restraint while on a wash cart, being moved for stripping the silver coating before recoating. Two chips were created, on the bottom edge and at the margin of the main mirror. This has since been repaired after several months of downtime and was back observing the sky on 2 June 2023 with apparently no loss of performance or quality.

Comparison of nominal sizes of apertures of the Gemini Observatory and some notable optical telescopes

== See also ==
- Kronberger 61
- List of largest optical reflecting telescopes
- Mauna Kea Observatories
