= Rosemary Wyse =

Scottish astrophysicist

- Born: 26 January 1957 (age 69); Dundee, Scotland
- Education: Queen Mary University of London (BSc); University of Cambridge (PhD)
- Awards: Annie Jump Cannon Award in Astronomy
- Scientific career
- Workplaces: Princeton University; University of California Berkeley; Johns Hopkins University; Institute of Astronomy, Cambridge
- Thesis: The formation and evolution of galaxies (1982)
- Academic advisors: Bernard Jones
- Website: physics-astronomy.jhu.edu/directory/rosemary-f-g-wyse

Rosemary F. G. Wyse (born 26 January 1957 in Dundee, Scotland) is a Scottish astrophysicist, Fellow of the Royal Astronomical Society (FRAS), and Alumni Centennial Professor of Physics and Astronomy at Johns Hopkins University. She was elected a Member of the National Academy of Sciences in 2025.

== Education ==
Wyse graduated from Queen Mary University of London in 1977 with a first-class Bachelor of Science degree in Physics and Astrophysics and obtained her PhD in astrophysics in the Institute of Astronomy at the University of Cambridge in 1983. Bernard Jones was her academic advisor.

== Career ==
Wyse conducted postdoctoral research at Princeton University and the University of California Berkeley. Her work has primarily been in the fields of galactic formation, composition and evolution. In addition to her research career, Wyse served as the first female President of the Aspen Center for Physics from 2010 to 2013, and served as a Trustee from 2006 to 2010.

== Honors and awards ==
- 1982 Amelia Earhart Fellowship from Zonta International
- 1983 Lindemann Fellowship from The English-Speaking Union of the Commonwealth
- 1986 Annie Jump Cannon Award in Astronomy of the American Astronomical Society
- 2016 Blaauw professor, Kapteyn Astronomical Institute, University of Groningen
- 2016 Dirk Brouwer Career Award from the Division of Dynamical Astronomy of the American Astronomical Society
- 2016 Fellow of the American Association for the Advancement of Science
- 2017 Fellow of the American Physical Society
- 2020 Legacy Fellow of the American Astronomical Society
