= Laura Ferrarese =

Italian astrophysicist

Laura Ferrarese FRSC
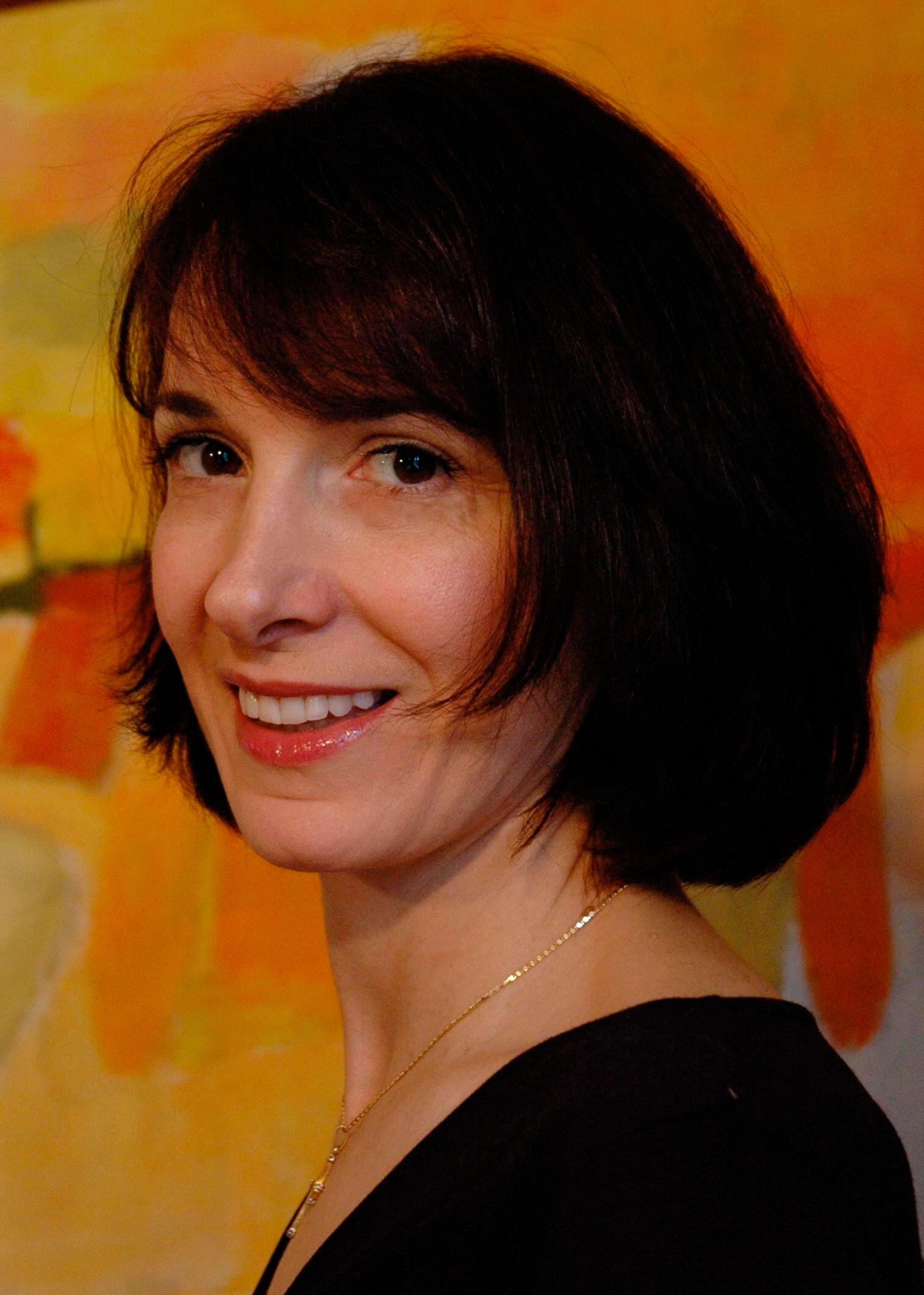
- Born: Padua, Italy
- Awards: Fellow of the Royal Society of Canada; Queen Elizabeth II Diamond Jubilee Medal; Helen Sawyer Hogg Prize; Peter G. Martin Award

Academic background
- Education: Johns Hopkins University University of Padua

Academic work
- Discipline: Astronomy
- Institutions: California Institute of Technology; Rutgers University; National Research Council of Canada
- Main interests: Supermassive Black Holes; Galaxy Dynamics; Extragalactic Distance Scale
- Website: http://astroherzberg.org/people/laura-ferrarese/

Laura Ferrarese FRSC is a researcher in space science at the National Research Council of Canada. Her primary work has been performed using data from the Hubble Space Telescope and the Canada-France-Hawaii Telescope.

== Early life and career ==
Laura Ferrarese was born in Padua, Italy and studied at the University of Padova, going on to receive a PhD in physics from Johns Hopkins University in 1996. She was a Hubble Postdoctoral Fellow at the California Institute of Technology before becoming a professor at Rutgers University in 2000. In 2004, she moved to the National Research Council (Canada), where she is now a Principal Research Officer. In July 2017, Ferrarese accepted a 16-month long appointment as Interim Director of the Gemini Observatory.

== Research ==
Laura Ferrarese's work has earned her the opportunity to spearhead projects using facilities such as the Hubble Space Telescope and the Canada-France-Hawaii Telescope. Her work concentrates on the masses of supermassive black holes and the stellar velocity dispersions of their host galaxies, and how they affect each other. She has also researched active galactic nuclei, galaxy dynamics and scaling relations, the extragalactic distance scale and the expansion rate of the Universe. In her work, Ferrarese uses data from ground and space-based observatories, including the Hubble Space Telescope (HST), the Chandra X-ray Observatory and the Canada-France-Hawaii Telescope (CFHT).

According to the SAO/NASA Astrophysics Data System, she has published 177 peer reviewed papers, which have collected over 20,000 citations. Her h-index is 66.

Ferrarese is currently a vice president of the International Astronomical Union (IAU) and she is serving on the board of directors of the Canada-France-Hawaii Telescope. From 2012 to 2014, she served as president of the Canadian Astronomical Society (CASCA). Ferrarese has also served on the board of directors for the Association of Universities for Research in Astronomy (AURA) and she has chaired the AURA Oversight Council for Gemini (AOC-G), among other appointments.

== Teaching ==
Ferrarese has taught at the University of Victoria, Rutgers University, Universitá di Padova, and SIGRAV School on Contemporary Relativity and Gravitational Physics.

== Recognition and awards ==
Ferrarese has won several awards, including the Queen Elizabeth II Diamond Jubilee medal in 2012, the Helen Sayer Hogg Prize in 2014, and the Peter G. Martin Award in 2015. In 2020, she was elected as a Fellow of the Royal Society of Canada.

On 30 November 2000, Ferrarese was featured in one of the episodes called "supermassive black holes" in the Horizon TV series.

== Publications ==
Ferrarese's most cited peer-review publications include:

- "A Fundamental Relation between Supermassive Black Holes and Their Host Galaxies", appeared in the Astrophysical Journal Letters, 2000
- "Final Results from the Hubble Space Telescope Key Project to Measure the Hubble Constant", appeared in the Astrophysical Journal, 2001
- "Central Masses and Broad-Line Region Sizes of Active Galactic Nuclei. II. A Homogeneous Analysis of a Large Reverberation-Mapping Database", appeared in the Astrophysical Journal, 2004
- "Supermassive Black Holes in Galactic Nuclei: Past Present and Future Research", appeared in Space Science Reviews, 2005
- "Beyond the Bulge: A Fundamental Relation between Supermassive Black Holes and Dark Matter Halos", appeared in the Astrophysical Journal Letters, 2002
- "The ACS Virgo Cluster Survey. VI. Isophotal Analysis and the Structure of Early-Type Galaxies", appeared in the Astrophysical Journal Letters, 2006

== Affiliations ==
Laura Ferrarese is an active member of the IAU (International Astronomical Union) and is affiliated with Division B Facilities, Technologies and Data Science, Division H Interstellar Matter and Local Universe and Division J Galaxies and Cosmology. She was a Past Member of Division VIII Galaxies & the Universe until 2012 and Commission 28 Galaxies until 2015 within the IAU. She is also a member of the American Astronomical Society and of the Canadian Astronomical Society.

== See also ==
- List of women in leadership positions on astronomical instrumentation projects
