= Annie Baglin =

French astrophysicist (1938–2026)

- Born: 28 August 1938; Amiens, France
- Died: 26 June 2026 (aged 87); Paris, France
- Citizenship: France
- Education: École normale supérieure de Fontenay-aux-Roses; Institut d'Astrophysique de Paris
- Employer(s): CNRS, Observatoire de Paris
- Known for: CoRoT, asteroseismology
- Awards: Médaille de vermeil de l'Académie de l'air et de l'espace (2007); Prix André-Lallemand (2009)
- Scientific career
- Doctoral advisor: Evry Schatzman

Annie Baglin (28 August 1938 – 26 June 2026) was a French astrophysicist. She was a specialist in stellar physics, and she was a pioneer in asteroseismology, the discipline that probes the interiors of stars by observing their infinitesimal periodic brightness oscillations, which result from waves that propagate throughout the stars’ otherwise invisible interior as leader of the CoRoT mission. She is also known for her research on exoplanets.

== Education and career ==
Annie Baglin began her studies at the École normale supérieure de Fontenay-aux-Roses in 1957. She passed the agrégation in mathematics, obtained a position of assistant professor at the Université de Paris-Sorbonne in 1961, then turned to the field of astrophysics. She joined the Institut d'astrophysique de Paris, where she defended a thesis in 1967 entitled "On the evolution of hot degenerate stars", under the supervision of Evry Schatzman.

She joined the Centre national de la recherche scientifique (CNRS) in 1968 and moved to the Observatoire de Nice in 1969. In 1988, she joined the Observatoire de Paris, where she became director of the DASGAL laboratory, then vice-president of the Conseil Scientifique from 1989 to 1993. She joined the DESPA laboratory of the Observatoire de Paris in 1996 (which later became LESIA, then LIRA).

Baglin retired in 2003, when she was granted the status of CNRS Directeur de Research Emerita until 2018.

== Scientific work ==
Baglin was a specialist in the physics of stellar interiors. While initially focusing on the fundamental aspects of this research, she was interested in collecting observational data to test theoretical approaches, first on the ground, and then from space in the second half of her career.

She worked on data from the European spacecraft Hipparcos, which measured extremely precisely the position, parallax, and proper motion of nearly 120,000 stars, paving the way for its successor Gaia and the field of galactic archaeology.

Baglin was above all a pioneer of space asteroseismology. In the 1970s, she was part of a small group of researchers at the origin of this discipline. From the mid-1980s, she worked with the Centre National d’Études Spatiales (CNES) and the European Space Agency (ESA) to make asteroseismology one of the themes of space research. By making it possible to probe the interiors of stars by measuring their oscillations, asteroseismology has since profoundly renewed stellar physics.

In this field, Baglin was first the scientific leader of the Étude de la Variabilité, de la Rotation et des Intérieurs Stellaires (EVRIS: Study of Stellar Variability, Rotation and Interiors) instrument, onboard the Russian Mars 96 probe, which was lost soon after launch. She then led the Convection, Rotation and planetary Transits (CoRoT) spacecraft project, first studied in France and then brought to the international level, dedicated to the study of stellar oscillations and the search for exoplanets. The development of this spacecraft faced many scientific, technical, institutional, and political obstacles – the project was threatened by potentially fatal budget cuts in the late 1990s.

Launched in 2006 and operational until 2012, following on the pathfinder Canadian asteroseismology mission Microvariability and Oscillations of Stars/Microvariabilité et Oscillations STellaires (MOST), CoRoT was the starting point for space stellar seismology (asteroseismology) and the search for exoplanets using transits of exoplanets in front of their host stars, as seen from Earth. The legacy of CoRoT was extended by NASA's Kepler and then the Transiting Exoplanet Survey Satellite (TESS) missions, to which Annie Baglin also contributed, as well as by the ESA PLAnetary Transits and Oscillations of stars (PLATO) mission, scheduled for launch in 2027 and in which she participated.

== Other activities ==
In the 1980s, Baglin initiated the "Schools of Stellar Internal Structure", which continues today as the "Evry Schatzman Schools” of the French National Stellar Physics Program. These schools help promote physics and astrophysics among students and young researchers.

She was also very active in the advancement of women in science, in particular in supporting and encouraging early career women in research.

Throughout her career, she also focused on maintaining contact with the general public, in particular by participating in events or giving public lectures, an activity to which she devoted even more effort after her retirement.

== Death ==
Baglin died on 26 June 2026, at the age of 87.

== Awards ==
- 2007: médaille de vermeil of the Académie de l'air et de l'espace, for her leadership of the CoRoT mission.
- 2009: prix André-Lallemand of the French Académie des sciences.
