= Susan Lepri =

American space scientist

Susan Lepri is an American space scientist and is currently Professor of Climate and Space Sciences and Engineering at the University of Michigan. She led development of portions of the Heavy Ion Sensor (HIS) which was launched onboard the European Space Agency's Solar Orbiter mission in February 2020. She has been director of the University of Michigan Space Physics Research Laboratory (SPRL) since 2021.

== Background and scientific career ==
Lepri was born and raised in Michigan and studied for her undergraduate in Physics, Astronomy and Astrophysics at the University of Michigan. She subsequently pursued her PhD in Atmospheric and Space Sciences at the University of Michigan. After 7.5 years as a research scientist, she was promoted to Associate Professor in 2013. In 2021 she became Director of the Space Physics Research Laboratory at University of Michigan, and was promoted to Full Professor later that same year.

In 2018, Lepri was awarded the Claudia Joan Alexander Trailblazer award for innovation in STEM curricula.

== Research interests ==
Lepri's primary scientific interest is in the measurement and study of heavy ions in the solar wind to reveal the physics of the solar wind and coronal mass ejections. To this end, she has developed space-based ion mass spectrometers, most recently portions of the Heavy Ion Sensor (HIS) onboard the European Space Agency’s Solar Orbiter mission. HIS has made the first ever measurements of the chemical composition of the solar wind in the inner heliosphere. She has also developed instrumentation as part of the technology development opportunity for NASA's upcoming Interstellar Mapping and Acceleration Probe (IMAP).

Lepri has also used models and observations of heavy ions in the solar wind to infer conditions in the local interstellar medium.
