= Jessica T. Dempsey =

Australian radio astronomer

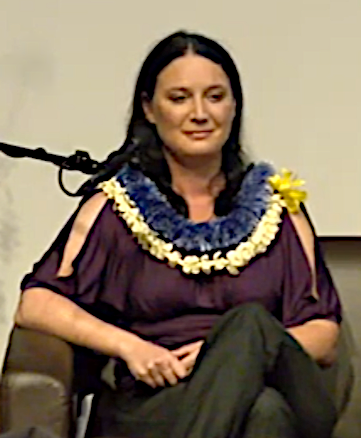
Dempsey in the video POWEHI - Hawai'i and the Event Horizon Telescope (2019)

Jessica Tui Dempsey (born 1978) is an Australian radio astronomer and the incoming director-general of the Square Kilometre Array Observatory. Her research focuses on the molecular composition of the Milky Way; as part of the Event Horizon Telescope team she also participated in creating the first images of supermassive black holes. She has been described as "a strong advocate for greater diversity, equality and opportunity in astronomy".

After growing up on a livestock farm in the outback, secondary education at Mary MacKillop College, Kensington from 1991 to 1995, and participation at the National Youth Science Forum, Dempsey studied both astrophysics and theatre and film science as an undergraduate at the University of New South Wales (UNSW), and in the late 1990s she worked as an actress. In 2000 she began working on the Arcminute Cosmology Bolometer Array Receiver at the South Pole, for her master's thesis, one of the first two Australian women to work as scientists at the pole, and in 2005 the first to spend the winter there. She completed a Ph.D. through UNSW in 2005, with the dissertation The view from the ice at the bottom of the world: Optical astronomy from Antarctica supervised by John W. V. Storey.

She moved to the James Clerk Maxwell Telescope in Hawaii in 2007, was named as an astronomer and operations manager in 2012, and became deputy director of the telescope in 2016. She was named as director of ASTRON, the Netherlands Institute for Radio Astronomy, for a term beginning in 2022. She added an affiliation as Professor by special appointment for Ethics in Astronomy at Radboud University Nijmegen in 2023. In 2025 she was announced as the next director of the Square Kilometre Array Observatory, for a five-year term beginning in 2026.
