= Cosmic Anisotropy Polarization Mapper =

Astronomical experiment

- Location(s): New Jersey
- Coordinates: 40°20′41″N 74°39′17″W
- Location of Cosmic Anisotropy Polarization Mapper

CAPMAP is an experiment at Princeton University to measure the polarization of the cosmic microwave background.

== See also ==
- Cosmic microwave background experiments
- Observational cosmology
