= Maria Mitchell Aquarium =

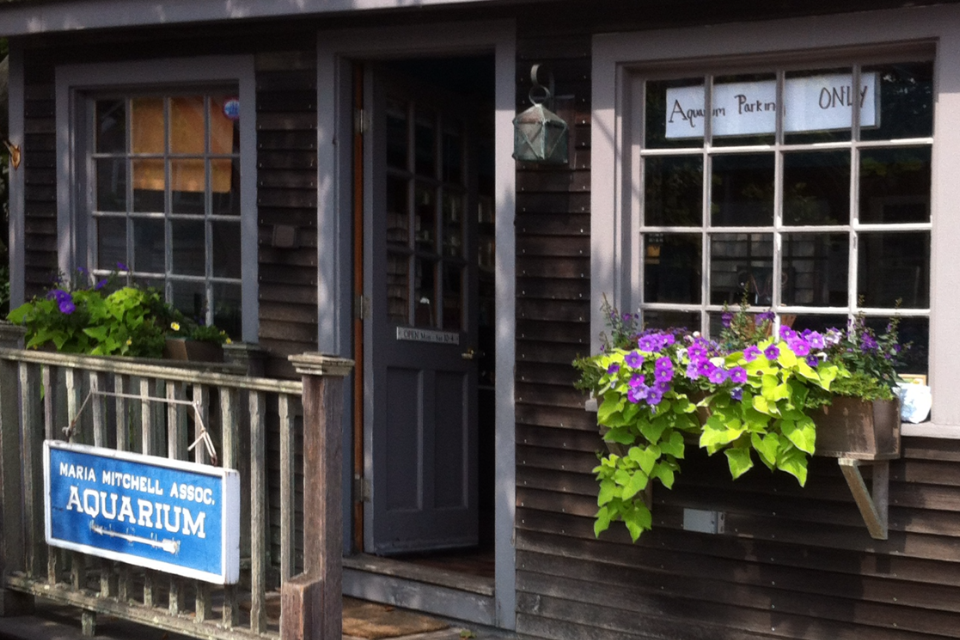
- Exterior of the Maria Mitchell Aquarium Gift Shop, July 2012
- Interactive map of Maria Mitchell Aquarium
- 41.2819°N 70.0959°W
- Date opened: 1997
- Location: Nantucket, Massachusetts, USA
- No. of animals: 50+
- No. of species: 50+
- Annual visitors: 7,000
- Memberships: 700 + (of Maria Mitchell Association)
- Website: www.mariamitchell.org/aquarium

The Maria Mitchell Association Aquarium (MMA Aquarium), also known as the Nantucket Aquarium, is a small, local, seasonal aquarium in Nantucket, Massachusetts. It serves as the island's only marine science center and resource. The aquarium is one of the many resources offered by the Maria Mitchell Association, a local non-profit organization that promotes scientific education and research in service to the legacy of Maria Mitchell (1818–1889), America's first female astronomer and Nantucket native.

== History ==
The Maria Mitchell Aquarium is on the site of the historic ticket office of the former Nantucket Railroad at 28 Washington Street. It is located directly on the shoreline of the Nantucket Harbor, which empties out into the Nantucket Sound. Specimens are primarily drawn from the waters around Nantucket, and are released back to those waters at the end of each summer.

The aquarium is the newest addition to the Maria Mitchell Association. It is one of only two Maria Mitchell Association properties that is not located on MMA's Vestal Street Campus, the other being Loine's Observatory on Milk Street Extension. The reason for the aquarium's location downtown is to attract more visitation from the public and to have a location that is closer to the harbor.

The aquarium has been located in the same place since 1997. It has been expanded since initial construction, it was originally just one small room but it has been expanded into three rooms and two outdoor touch tanks.

=== Science Center project ===
The directors of the Maria Mitchell Association are planning to expand the aquarium greatly by 2015. The plan is to expand the aquarium by moving it across the street to a plot of land that was swapped with MMA by the Nantucket Land Bank in 2010. The Nantucket Land Bank hopes to open up Nantucket Harbor for both islanders and tourists, and with the absence of the current MMA Aquarium, this could be more easily achieved.

One of MMA's plans for the new site is to build a domed theater, and this theater caused controversy amongst Nantucketers, particularly the members of the Historic District Commission (HDC) of Nantucket when the project was presented to them for approval. Ultimately, the $10 million project passed the HDC 3–2 in March 2013, with the members of the HDC requesting minor changes. One member of the HDC was very adamantly against the project:

It's the single biggest mistake the HDC has ever made. I think it's horrible, absolutely horrible. It's nothing more than a massive self-branding exercise. It's no different than putting in a Cheesecake Factory down there.

— Kevin Kuester, March 2013,

Kevin Kuester, a member of the HDC, was not present at the hearing. Only two members of the HDC who were present voted against the project. Linda Williams, former head of the HDC, was very much in favor of the project. She explained that the members of the HDC should not presume that the future Aquarium should blend in with Nantucket's historic houses.

It's not going to look like a house, it shouldn't act like a house. It's not quacking like a house, so trying to make it look like a house is not working for me. I think it works for me, as what it is – a museum. I don't think it's appropriate to put the restrictions of a residential structure on a museum.

— Linda Williams, March 2013,

At least ten local island businesses and other local non-profit organizations have written letters to the HDC supporting the MMA's Science Center project, and there has been a great deal of approval for the project in the Nantucket community. At least 30 locals showed up at the hearing in March 2013 to help support the project. After the project's approval, Maria Mitchell Association Director Janet Schulte summed up the association's current problem and their goal for the new Science Center:

We currently have to bunch field trips in only the goodweather months. With the new center, science can be taught throughout the calendar, not just at the beginning and end of the school year

— Janet Schulte, March 2013,

Director Janet Schulte hoped to break ground for the new Science Center in September 2013; however funding dried up and the project has been postponed, and may not occur.

== Exhibits ==
The aquarium contains 20 saltwater tanks and two "touch tanks" in three small buildings. The tanks house local species that are released back to the wild when the aquarium closes for the winter. The touch tanks let visitors get close to local species such as crabs, Horseshoe crabs, and clams.

=== Touch tanks ===
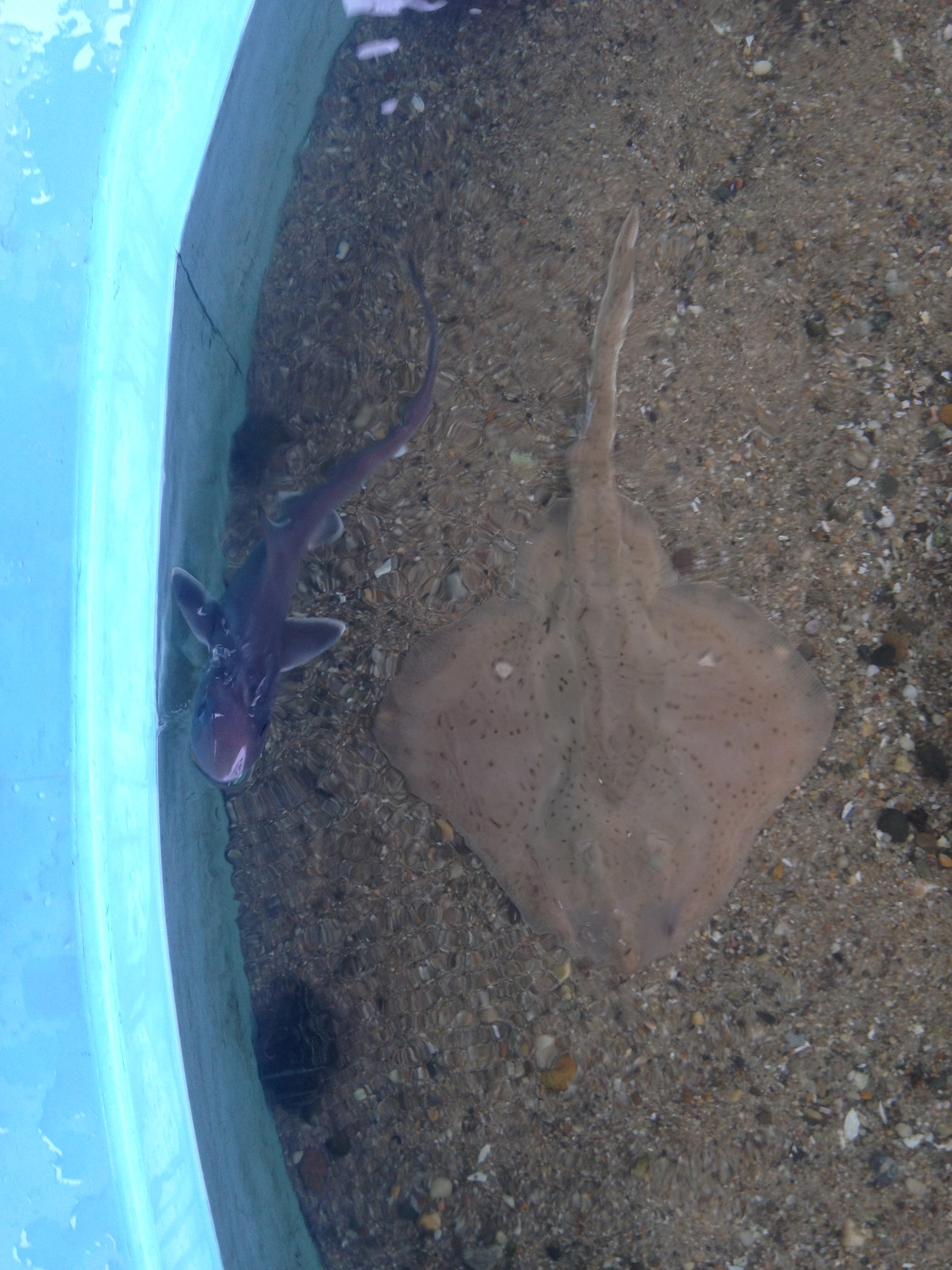
A Smooth dogfish (left) and a Little Skate (right), two cartilaginous fish at the Nantucket Aquarium in 2013.

The aquarium's highlights include a touch tank which is overlooked by the small aquarium gift shop. The touch tank houses crabs, fish (particularly flounder), shrimp, clams, and snails, including a large, predatory snail called a moon snail.

=== Other exhibits ===
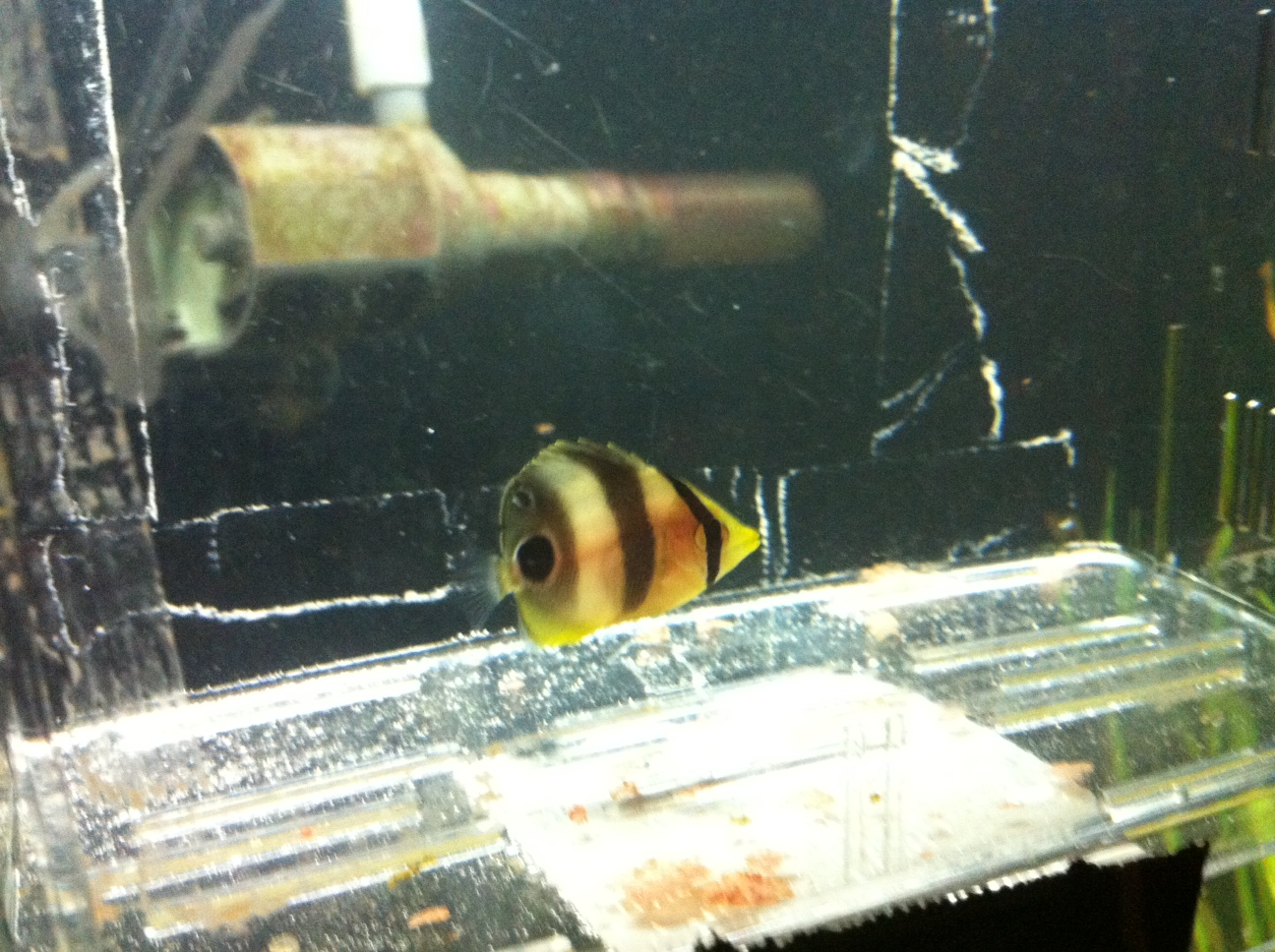
A Spotfin Butterflyfish as seen at the Maria Mitchell Aquarium, August 2012

Other highlights of the aquarium include free personal tours by aquarium staff and a focus on completely local species. Animals include an abnormally large American lobster and a blue lobster (shell changed blue due to an unusual discoloration), a common octopus, and lined seahorses. Local favorites are also on display and include American eels, the dusky smooth-hound, sea robins, Raja erinacea, Loligo pealei, and Aurelia aurita.

The displays often change because the aquarium's staff incorporate the animals that they find into the exhibits. The largest tank that the aquarium contains is 400 gallons, and there is also a larger outdoor tank that overlooks Nantucket Harbor. This circular outdoor tank is known to house larger fish such as scup and black sea bass, but also small sharks called dusky smooth-hound, or smooth dogfish. The rooms also include tanks for trigger fish, lobsters, mantis shrimp, tropical fish, and common local species (such as the aforementioned aquarium highlights).

Because the Gulf Stream passes by the Atlantic Ocean side of the island, tropical fish such as French angelfish, groupers, butterflyfish, damselfish, jacks, and permits are occasionally on exhibit.

== Research ==
The aquarium participates in research related to the bay scallop (with Nantucket Shellfish Association), as well as to the Biodiversity of Marine Fishes and Invertebrates, and participates in the annual Horseshoe Crab Survey.

=== Bay scallop research ===
One of the aquarium's chief research projects is the Bay Scallop Research Project. Nantucket Bay Scallops, Argopecten irradians irradians, add two million dollars to the Nantucket economy because they are very profitable, and the particularly profitable part of the bay scallop is the abductor muscle which holds the shell together. Thousands of bay scallops die each winter because Nantucketers hunt them for food. The Maria Mitchell Association and Nantucket Shellfish Association have been collaborating to calculate the number of bay scallops (particularly young bay scallops) in Nantucket Harbor since 2003. They use spat lines to collect scallops of all ages. The leaders of this ongoing project are Dr. Peter Boyce, Dr. Bob Kennedy, and Val Hall. Val Hall has observed that invasive algal blooms may have also contributed to the decline in bay scallop populations. According to the Maria Mitchell Association:

Val has successfully defended her doctoral dissertation proposal titled "The Ecological Significance of Fall Spawning in the Nantucket Bay Scallop, Argopecten irradians irradians (Lamarck, 1819)" to the faculty and students at UMass SMAST, and to her graduate committee. Her accomplishment is a major milestone in the Maria Mitchell Association's/Nantucket Shellfish Association's Bay Scallop Research Project.

— Maria Mitchell Association, 2009

=== Horseshoe crab survey ===
The aquarium participates in the annual Nantucket Horseshoe Crab Survey. In early summer, from about May to June, the aquarium observes how many Horseshoe Crabs they can find mating in certain areas of the island.

=== Biodiversity of marine fishes and invertebrates ===
The Maria Mitchell Aquarium sponsors daily collecting trips during the summer that are open to the public (but require a fee). The point of these trips is to not only educate customers, but also to collect a survey of the marine species in Nantucket's waters. The top six most abundant species in Nantucket's waters are as follows:

| | Species | Abundance |
|---|---|---|
| 1 | Atlantic silverside | Found in the highest numbers, but not the most common species. Seasonal. |
| 2 | Black-fingered mud crab | First most commonly found species, second most abundant species |
| 3 | Northern pipefish | Second most commonly caught species, third most abundant species |
| 4 | Four-spine stickleback | Extremely abundant year-round. |
| 5 | Shore shrimp | Both abundant and common. |
| 6 | Striped killifish | Found in condensed schools. |

The Maria Mitchell Aquarium has collected about 56,347 fish, crabs, snails, and shrimp since the biodiversity project was launched at the beginning of the century. The 56,347 individual animals represent 104 marine species.

== Education ==
The aquarium offers various programs including Marine Ecology Field Trips, Family Snorkeling Tours, Beach Discovery Field Trips, Night Marine Ecology Field Trips, Whale Watches, and Seal Cruises.

=== Marine ecology field trips ===
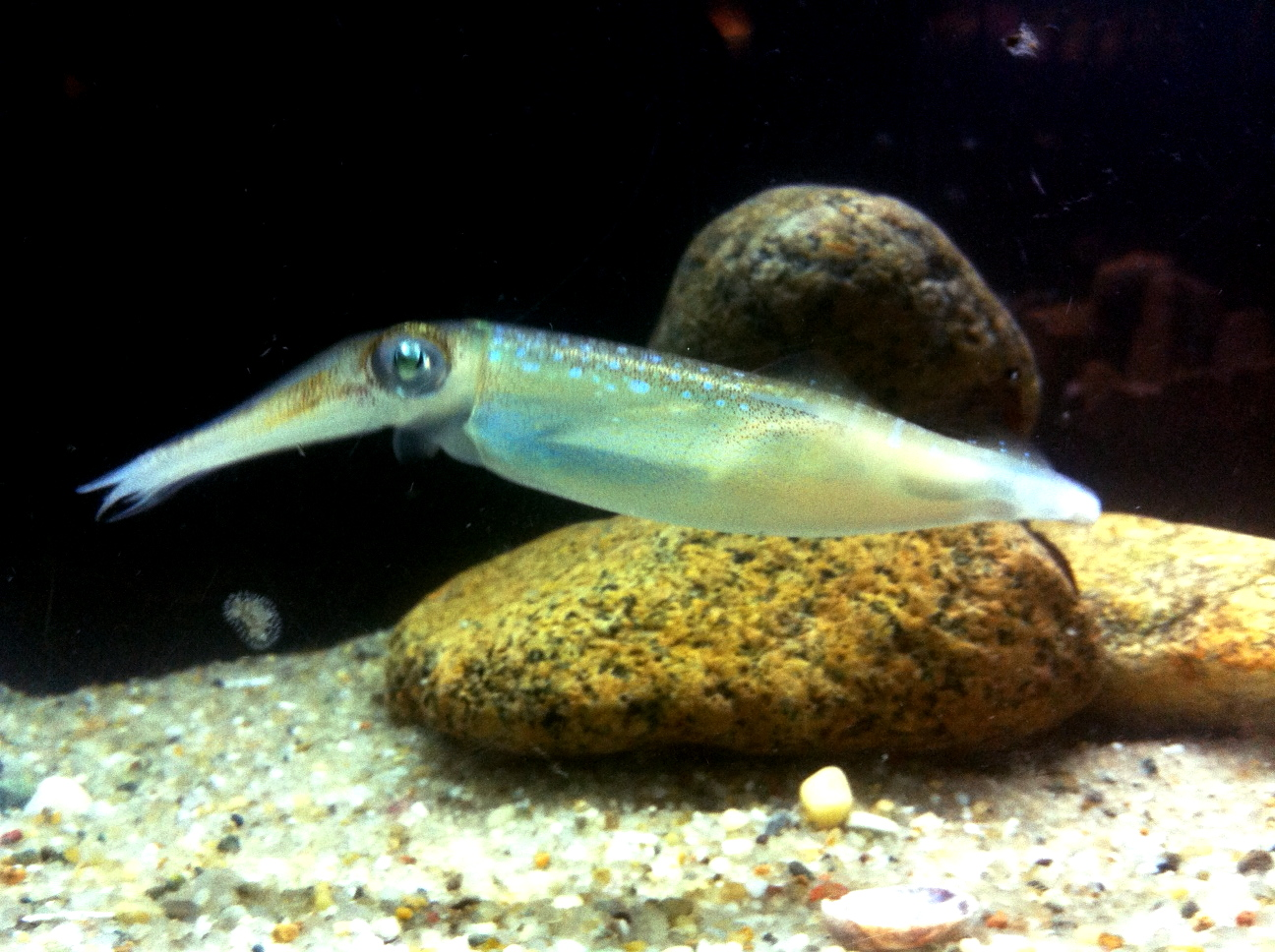
A loligo squid as seen at the Maria Mitchell Aquarium, July 2012. Squid are caught on the aquarium's Night Marine Ecology Walks

The Marine Ecology Field Trips are a series of programs offered by the aquarium that are part of their biodiversity project. The Marine Field Trips also allow for aquarium staff to collect animals. Marine Field Trips are open to the public, but participants must pay a fee. During the daily Marine Ecology Field Trips, a seine net is used to collect animals in the eelgrass beds.

There are different kinds of marine field trips including daily Marine Ecology Field Trips, Family Snorkeling Tours, Beach Discovery Field Trips, and Night Marine Ecology Field Trips.

=== "Feeding Frenzy" ===
The Feeding Frenzy is a daily program in the summer in which the aquarium staff feed the aquarium animals and visitors who pay a special fee get to watch.

=== Whale watches and seal cruises ===
The Maria Mitchell Aquarium is partnered with a local eco-tour company called Shearwater Excursions, and, during the summer months, they lead tours of the harbor and of the ocean which involve viewings of marine mammals such as seals and whales. The Seal Cruise takes customers to nearby Muskeget Island to look at grey seals.

== See also ==
- Maria Mitchell
- Maria Mitchell Association
- Maria Mitchell Observatory
