= Harriet McWilliams Parsons =

American astronomer

Harriet McWilliams Parsons (December 17, 1892 – July 1986) was an American astronomer associated with Yerkes Observatory and the University of Chicago in the early twentieth century. She conducted research in stellar photometry and astrometry and earned a doctorate in astronomy and astrophysics from the University of Chicago in 1921. Parsons was among more than 100 women identified as having worked at Yerkes Observatory between 1895 and 1950, many of whom performed observational, analytical, and computational work that went largely unaccredited in the published scientific record.

== Early life and education ==
Harriet McWilliams Parsons was born on December 17, 1892, in Troy, Pennsylvania. Her father, Eli Burton Parsons, was a lawyer, and her brothers attended Yale University. She attended Vassar College in Poughkeepsie, New York, where the astronomy department was then under the leadership of associate professor Caroline Furness, herself a former student of the pioneering astronomer Maria Mitchell. Parsons took sixteen courses across the astronomy, physics, and mathematics departments, encompassing nearly the entirety of Vassar's offerings in those areas. Parsons graduated with honors in 1915 and was awarded one of fewer than ten Sutro Fellowships granted that year, a competitive fellowship that enabled her to pursue graduate study beyond Vassar.

== Graduate work at Yerkes Observatory ==
On the recommendation of Caroline Furness, who had maintained a professional relationship with Yerkes Observatory director Edwin B. Frost since her own work there in 1900, Parsons came to Yerkes Observatory in 1915 to pursue graduate study at the University of Chicago. Frost's acceptance of Furness's recommendation reflected a broader pattern at Yerkes, which had developed informal pipelines from women's colleges to supply graduate students and research staff.

Parsons earned her Master of Science degree from the University of Chicago in 1916. Her master's thesis, "The Photo-Visual Magnitudes of the Stars in the Pleiades," was submitted to the Ogden Graduate School of Science in the Department of Astronomy. The work involved detailed photographic photometry of stars in the Pleiades star cluster and contributed to the growing scientific understanding of the relationship between a star's color index and its luminosity — concepts that would later be formalized in the Hertzsprung-Russell diagram, one of the foundational tools of modern astrophysics. The thesis was published in The Astrophysical Journal in 1918.

Parsons continued her doctoral research at Yerkes using the observatory's 24-inch reflector telescope, making precise astrometric and photometric measurements of stars to sixteenth magnitude in eight fields surrounding variable stars, noting trends between proper motion and magnitude.

During her time at Yerkes, Parsons was elected to the American Astronomical Society and published in outlets including Popular Astronomy and the Monthly Notices of the Royal Astronomical Society. Her work on the Pleiades was cited by international researchers, including in publications from the Netherlands. Parsons was awarded her Doctor of Philosophy from the University of Chicago in September 1921, in the Department of Astronomy and Astrophysics.

== Legacy ==
Parsons was one of more than one hundred women identified as having worked at Yerkes Observatory between 1895 and 1950 in various capacities, ranging from graduate students and visiting researchers to computers, stenographers, and volunteer assistants.

== Selected publications ==
- Parsons, Harriet McWilliams. "Photovisual Magnitudes of the Stars in the Pleiades." The Astrophysical Journal 47 (1918): 38–45.
- Parsons, Harriet McWilliams. "Astrometric and Photometric Statistics of Certain of Hagen's Fields Photographed with the 24-Inch Reflector." Publications of the Yerkes Observatory 4, Part VII (1928).

== Bibliography ==
- Nguyen, Arianne. "One Star in the Celestial Firmament of Workers: The Life and Career of Astronomer Harriet McWilliams Parsons, 1892–1986." Archive 27: 67–96.
- Glusman, Rowen, Audrey Scott, Michael Martinez, Alexis Chapman, Amanda Muratore, Jorge Sanchez, and William Cerny. "Biographical Sketches of Women Working at Yerkes Observatory and Harriet McWilliams Parsons." AAS Historical Astronomy Division, September 2021.
- Palmieri, Kristine. "They Were Astronomers." Physics Today, November 2023.
- Lankford, John. American Astronomy: Community, Careers, and Power, 1859–1940. Chicago: University of Chicago Press, 1997.
- Rossiter, Margaret W. Women Scientists in America: Struggles and Strategies to 1940. Baltimore: Johns Hopkins University Press, 1982.
