= Vico =

Vico or de Vico may refer to:

== People ==
=== Surname ===
- Antonio Vico (cardinal) (1847–1929), Catholic cardinal
- Antonio Vico y Pintos (1840–1940), Spanish stage actor
- Claudio Vico (died 1599), Roman Catholic prelate and Bishop of Strongoli
- Enea Vico (1523–1567), Italian engraver
- Fede Vico (born 1994), Spanish footballer
- Francesco de Vico (1805–1848), Italian astronomer and Jesuit priest
- Francesco Vico, 17th century Italian Baroque painter
- Francisco José Vico Vela, Spanish computer scientist and engineer
- George Vico (1923–1994), American baseball player
- Giambattista Vico (1668–1744), Italian philosopher, historian, and jurist
- Giovanni di Vico (died 1366), Italian Ghibelline leader, lord of Viterbo, Vetralla, Orvieto, Narni and numerous other lands
- Jovica Vico (born 1978), Bosnian footballer
- Ludovico Vico (1952–2021), Italian politician
- Patricia Vico (born 1972), Spanish actress
- Stefan Vico (born 1995), Montenegrin footballer
- Uros Vico (born 1981), Croatian-born Italian retired tennis player

=== Given name ===
- Vico Consorti (1902–1979), Italian sculptor
- Vico Hui (born 1965/6), Hong Kong businessman
- Vico Magistretti (1920–2006), Italian industrial designer
- Vico Meien (born 1998), German footballer
- Vico Merklein (born 1977), German paracyclist
- Vico Mossa (1914–2003), Italian architect and writer
- Vico Thai, Australian actor
- Vico Torriani (1920–1998), Swiss actor and singer
- Vico Zeljković (born 1988), Bosnian businessman and football executive

=== Other ===
- Victor Vico Haddad (born 1960), Israeli footballer and manager
- Victor Vico Sotto (born 1989), Filipino politician
- Vico (footballer), Brazilian football forward Vinicius Duarte (born 1996)
- Vico C, Puerto Rican rapper Luis Armando Lozada Cruz (born 1971)
- Christopher Paul Neil (born 1975), known by Interpol as Vico, convicted child molester

== Places ==
- Vico, Corse-du-Sud, a French commune
- Lake Vico, a lake in northern Lazio, Italy

=== In space ===
- De Vico (crater), a lunar crater named after Francesco de Vico
- 20103 de Vico, a main-belt asteroid
- Comet de Vico (disambiguation), several comets discovered by Francesco de Vico

== See also ==
- Vi-Co, a brand name of chocolate malt drink
- Vicco, Kentucky, US
- Vicos, a mountain in the Andes in Peru
