= Vassar College Observatory =

- U.S. National Register of Historic Places
- U.S. National Historic Landmark
- New York State Register of Historic Places
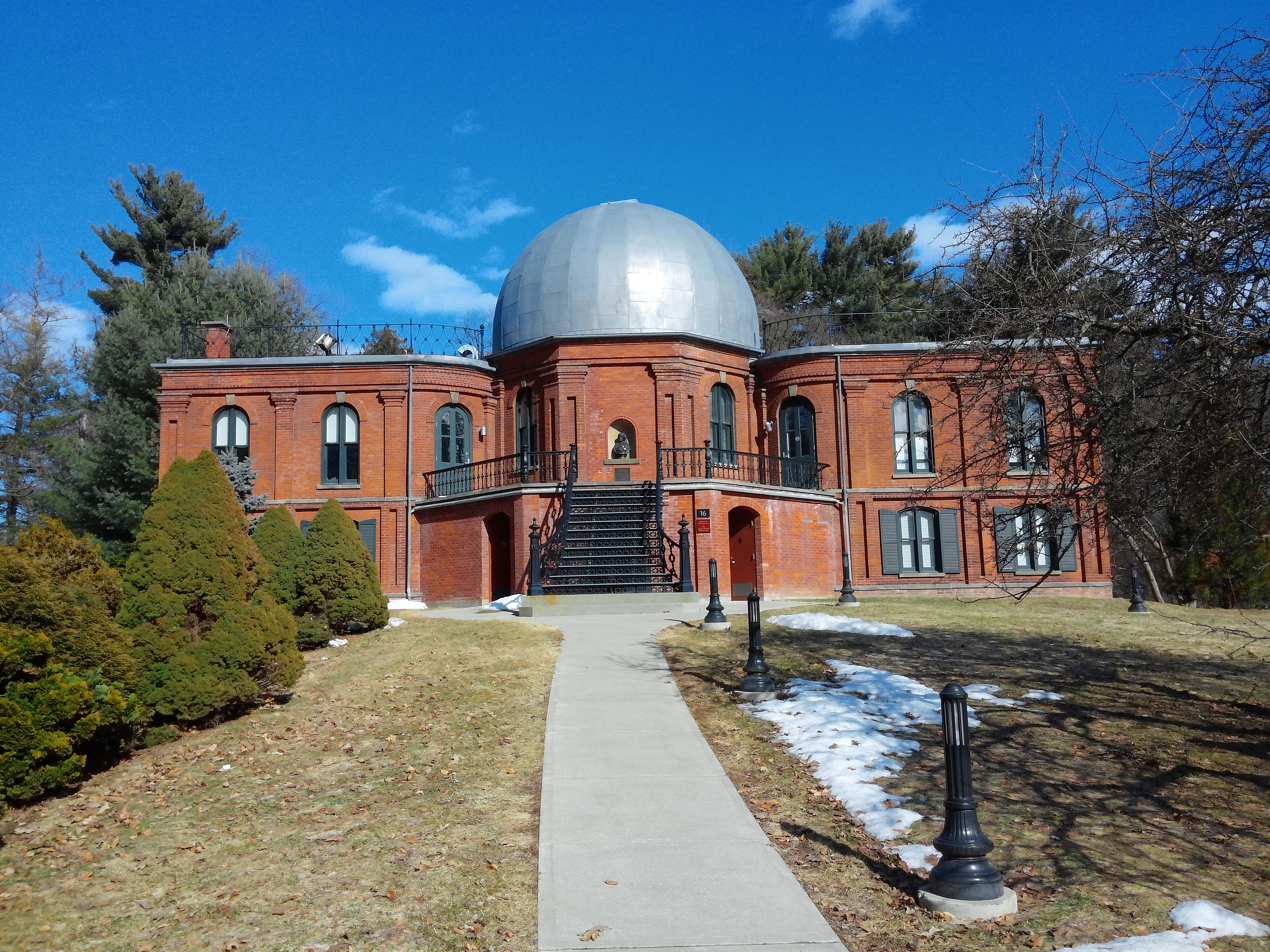
- The Observatory in 2014 with its dome sealed

- Location within New York
- Location: Vassar College campus, Town of Poughkeepsie, NY
- Coordinates: 41.688285°N 73.893310°W
- Built: 1865
- NRHP reference No.: 91002051
- NYSRHP No.: 02714.000020

Significant dates
- Added to NRHP: July 17, 1991
- Designated NHL: July 17, 1991
- Designated NYSRHP: July 17, 1991

The Vassar College Observatory is an astronomical observatory of the private Vassar College, located near the eastern edge of the Poughkeepsie, New York college's campus. Finished in 1865, it was the first building on the college's campus, older even than the Main Building, with which it shares the status of National Historic Landmark. The observatory's significance is due to its association with Maria Mitchell, the first widely known female astronomer in the United States.

As the college has built a new observatory on a hill near the edge of campus, the building is no longer used for astronomy. In 2008 it underwent a large restoration and renovation and now houses the offices of the education department and classrooms.

== History ==
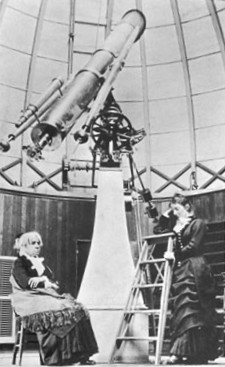
Maria Mitchell (seated) inside the dome of the Vassar College Observatory

Mitchell, the first manager of the observatory, focused primarily on observing planets and their satellites. She was an avid advocate for using the observatory as part of courses of study. Students could frequently be found using both the main telescope and any number of smaller instruments. In addition to serving as an educational and research facility, the original observatory also served as a home for Maria and her father during and after her tenure as professor.

Professor Mary W. Whitney assumed the directorship in 1888. She had been a student of Mitchell's. Whitney focused on comets and published in 1890, 1892 and 1895 in the Astronomical Journal.

It was noted in Popular Astronomy in 1904, "In general the work done at Vassar is similar to that done at several of the smaller German and Italian observatories."

The building was declared a National Historic Landmark in 1991.

The old observatory is no longer used for research. While the building still stands, the telescope has been removed and most of the building is used as office space. In the late 1990s, a new observatory was built on the Vassar College campus. The Class of '51 Observatory houses two telescopes; one 20-inch reflector used primarily for public outreach, and a 32-inch reflector used for teaching and research. It is tied with the Austin-Fellows telescope of the Stull Observatory at Alfred University for being the 2nd-largest optical telescope in the state of New York, the largest being the 40-inch reflector at SUNY Oneonta College Observatory.

=== List of directors ===
- Maria Mitchell (1865–1888)
- Mary W. Whitney (1888–1895)
- Caroline Furness (1895–1936)
- Maud Worcester Makemson (1936-1957)
- Henry Albers (1958–1990)
- Fred Chromey (1990–2016)
- Colette Salyk (2016–present)

== See also ==
- List of astronomical observatories
- List of National Historic Landmarks in New York
- National Register of Historic Places listings in Poughkeepsie, New York
