= Emilia Pisani Belserene =

American astronomer

Emilia Pauline Pisani (Lee) Belserene (December 12, 1922 – December 11, 2012) was an American astronomer specializing in the observation of variable stars and recognized as an expert on RR Lyrae variable stars. She became known for her work as the director of the Maria Mitchell Observatory in Nantucket and for her biographical writings on Maria Mitchell.

== Education and career ==
Belserene was a student at New Rochelle High School, and was awarded a full scholarship to Smith College. She became the only astronomy student there, with astronomer Clinton B. Ford as a faculty mentor. She graduated summa cum laude in 1943, and went to Columbia University for part-time graduate study while at the same time raising a family and teaching part-time at Hunter College.

She completed her Ph.D. in 1953. Her dissertation, Period changes of variable stars in Messier 3, was supervised by Martin Schwarzschild. It involved observations using the 36-inch refracting telescope at the Lick Observatory in California; although this telescope had long been in use, with first light in 1888, Belserene was the first woman to use it.

She became a professor of astronomy at Lehman College and then, in 1979, was hired as director of the Maria Mitchell Observatory. In her period as director of the observatory, she supervised many student research projects involving the observations of variable stars, and the analysis of those observations using computer algorithms she had written, leading to over 100 publications.

She retired in 1991, moved to Port Angeles, Washington, and died on December 11, 2012.

== Recognition ==
Belserene was named a Fellow of the American Association for the Advancement of Science in 1959.
