= Hinchman House =

Historic House and Natural Science Museum

- Alternative names: Hinchman House Natural Science Museum

General information
- Architectural style: Federal-style
- Location: 7 Milk Street, Nantucket, Nantucket
- Coordinates: 41.2803°N 70.1038°W
- Year built: 1812
- Owner: Maria Mitchell Association

Technical details
- Floor count: 3

Design and construction
- Architect: Thomas Coffin

The Hinchman House, also known as the Hinchman House Natural Science Museum and the Lydia S. Hinchman House, is a historical building and natural science museum in Nantucket, Massachusetts currently owned by the Maria Mitchell Association.

== History ==
The Hinchman House was built around 1812 by whaling captain Thomas Coffin with federal-style architecture. From 1870 to 1929 the house was owned by the Woodbridge family. In 1919, the Woodbridge family donated the rear yard of the home to the Maria Mitchell Association which had formed 17 years earlier and already oversaw Maria Mitchell's former home and birthplace across the street. In 1929, the home was purchased by Lydia S. Hinchman, a first cousin of astronomer Maria Mitchell. During Mrs. Hinchman's ownership of the home, she never lived in the building and instead let her children and grandchildren use the building as a summer home. When Mrs. Hinchman died in 1938, she willed the property to her son with the request for it to go to the Maria Mitchell Association to be used as a science museum once he died. With his death in 1944, the building was accepted by the Maria Mitchell Association and the next year turned into a natural history museum focusing on local wildlife to the island.

== Natural Science Museum ==
As a natural science museum, the Hinchman House displays both living and preserved wildlife found around the island of Nantucket. Many of the preserved specimens are birds from the Maria Mitchell Association's collection of over 900 specimens of birds found on Nantucket. Living animals in the museum include native and invasive turtles, fish, frogs, snakes, salamanders used for educational programs on local ecosystems. The building also acts as a site for other programs ran by the Maria Mitchell Association's education department.

In 2025 and 2023 the museum won silver in the Best of Cape Cod Museums category, given out by Cape Cod Life Publications.
