= Peirce Middle School =

Peirce Middle School may refer to:

- Cyrus Peirce Middle School, Nantucket Public Schools, Massachusetts
- E. N. Peirce Middle school, West Chester Area School District, Pennsylvania

== See also ==
- Pierce Middle School (disambiguation)
