= Margaretta Palmer =

American astronomer (1862–1924)

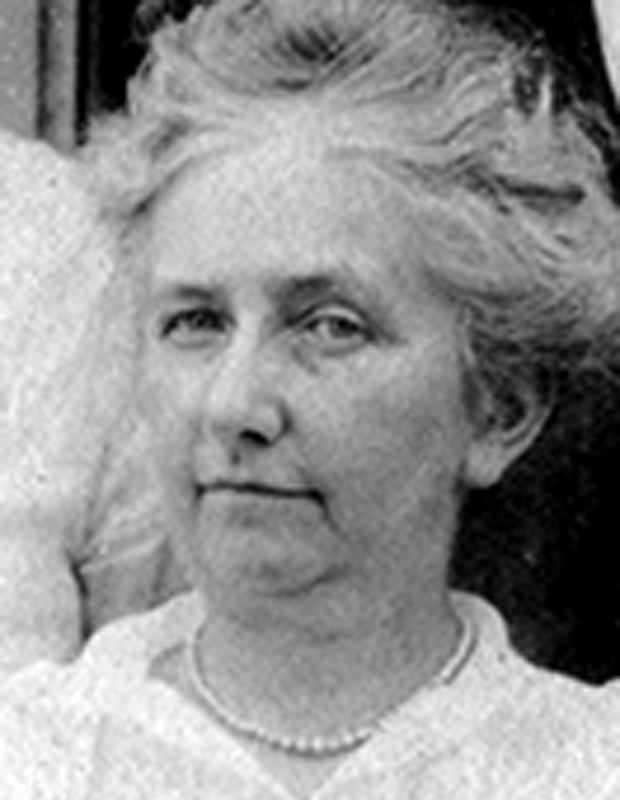
- Palmer in 1918
- Born: August 29, 1862; Branford, Connecticut, U.S.
- Died: January 30, 1924 (aged 61); New Haven, Connecticut, U.S.
- Education: Vassar College; Yale University
- Scientific career
- Institutions: Yale University Observatory

Margaretta Palmer (1862–1924) was an American astronomer, one of the first women to earn a doctorate in astronomy. She worked at the Yale University Observatory at a time when woman were frequently hired as assistant astronomers, but when most of these women had only a high school education, so Palmer's advanced degree made her unusual for her time.

== Early life and education ==
Palmer was born to a farming family in Branford, Connecticut on August 29, 1862, and completed a bachelor's degree at Vassar College in 1887. At Yale, she took two classes in astronomy with Maria Mitchell, although her graduation address concerned Greek tragedy. After graduating, she worked as an assistant to Mitchell and as a Latin instructor at Vassar for two years.

In 1889 she was hired by the Yale University Observatory, and in 1892 she was admitted to graduate study at Yale University. Her 1894 doctorate was from the mathematics department at Yale, but its subject was astronomy, as it concerned the calculation of the orbit of a comet C/1847 T1 discovered in 1847 by Maria Mitchell. Palmer's thesis noted that the comets she chose to study were chosen partially because they had been discovered by women. She was one of the first seven women to earn a doctorate at Yale. It has been suggested that she was "the first woman ever to earn a doctorate" in astronomy, although fellow astronomer Dorothea Klumpke earned a Doctor of Science degree from the University of Paris in 1893. It would be over 30 years before another woman, Cecilia Payne-Gaposchkin, became the first doctorate in astronomy at Radcliffe College.

During this period, Palmer also determined the orbits of three other comets, and collected a large set of observations of the moons of Jupiter. However, she was unable to complete the extensive calculation of the orbits of the moons because of a "long and serious illness".

== Later career ==
Palmer remained at the Yale Observatory for the rest of her life. She became a member of the American Astronomical Society in 1915. Her work included the compilation of the Yale Index to Star Catalogues, a cross-reference of the appearances of stars from the Durchmusterung in other star catalogs, which she announced in an incomplete form in a 1917 publication. For most of her time at Yale she was a research assistant, with some additional part-time work as a cataloguer in the Yale University Library, but she became an instructor at Yale in 1923. In 1924, with Frank Schlesinger, she published another pioneering star catalog, of the distances to 1870 stars calculated by Schlesinger's use of the principle of parallax.

== Personal life ==
Palmer was Episcopalian, and also published two books on religious topics, Teachers' Notes on Our Book of Worship (Young Churchman Co., 1914) and Teachers' Notes on the Church Catechism (Morehouse, 1918). She was a member of the New Haven Chamber of Commerce. Palmer died of her injuries on January 30, 1924, two weeks after an automobile accident, in New Haven, Connecticut.
