= Margaret Harwood =

American astronomer (1885–1979)

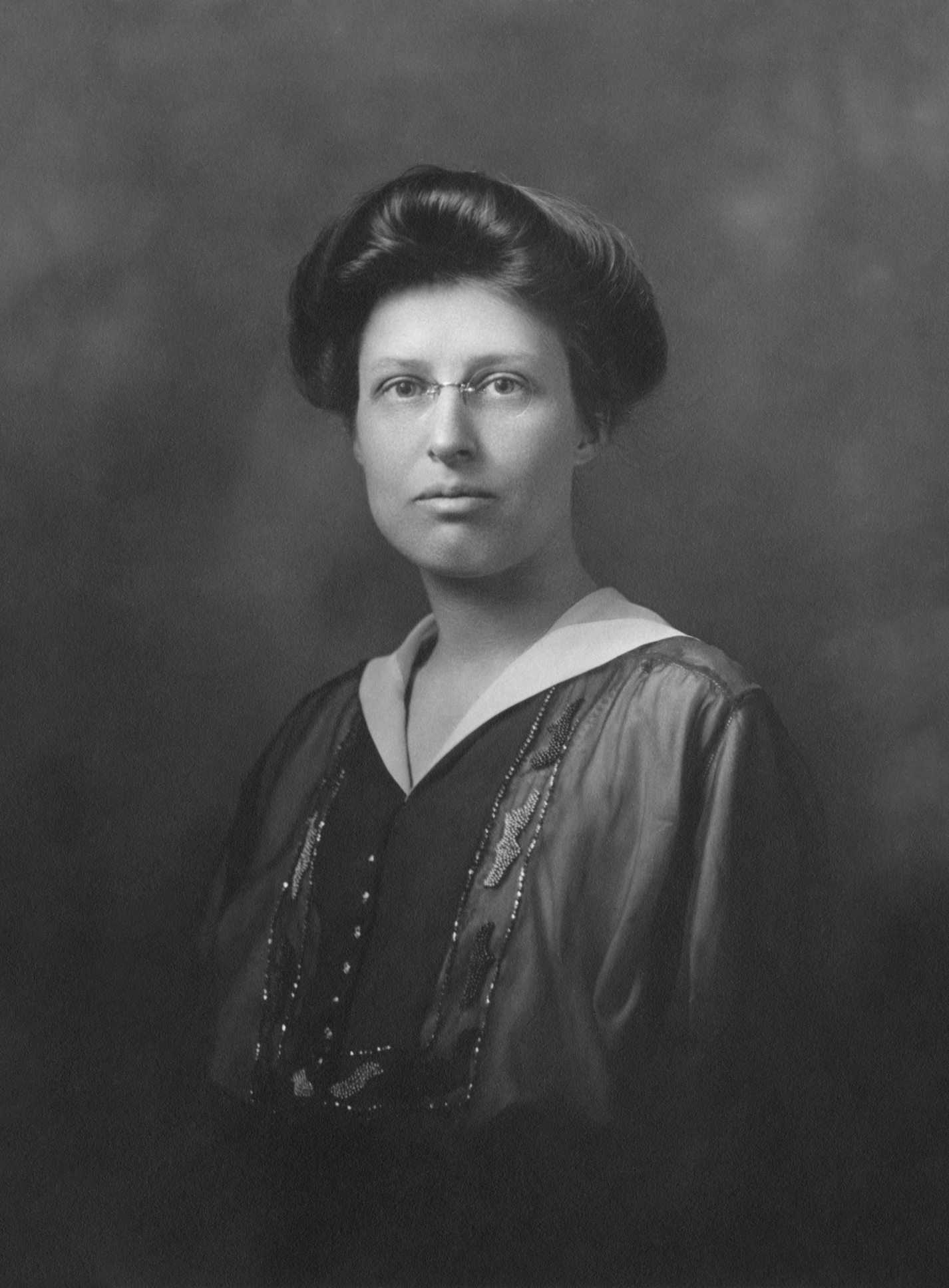
- Born: March 19, 1885; Littleton, Massachusetts, U.S.
- Died: February 6, 1979 (aged 93); Boston, Massachusetts, U.S.
- Education: Radcliffe College (AB); University of California, Berkeley (AM)
- Awards: Annie J. Cannon Award in Astronomy (1962)
- Scientific career
- Fields: Astronomy
- Workplaces: Harvard Observatory; Maria Mitchell Observatory

Margaret Harwood (March 19, 1885 – February 6, 1979) was an American astronomer specializing in photometry and the first director of the Maria Mitchell Observatory in Nantucket, Massachusetts. An asteroid discovered in 1960 was named 7040 Harwood in her honor.

== Early life and education ==
Margaret Harwood was born in 1885 in Littleton, Massachusetts, one of nine children of Herbert Joseph Harwood and Emelie Augusta Green. In 1907, she received her bachelor's degree in astronomy (AB) from Radcliffe College, where she was a member of Phi Beta Kappa. In 1916, she earned her master's degree in astronomy (AM) from the University of California, studying at the campus in Berkeley, California.

== Career ==
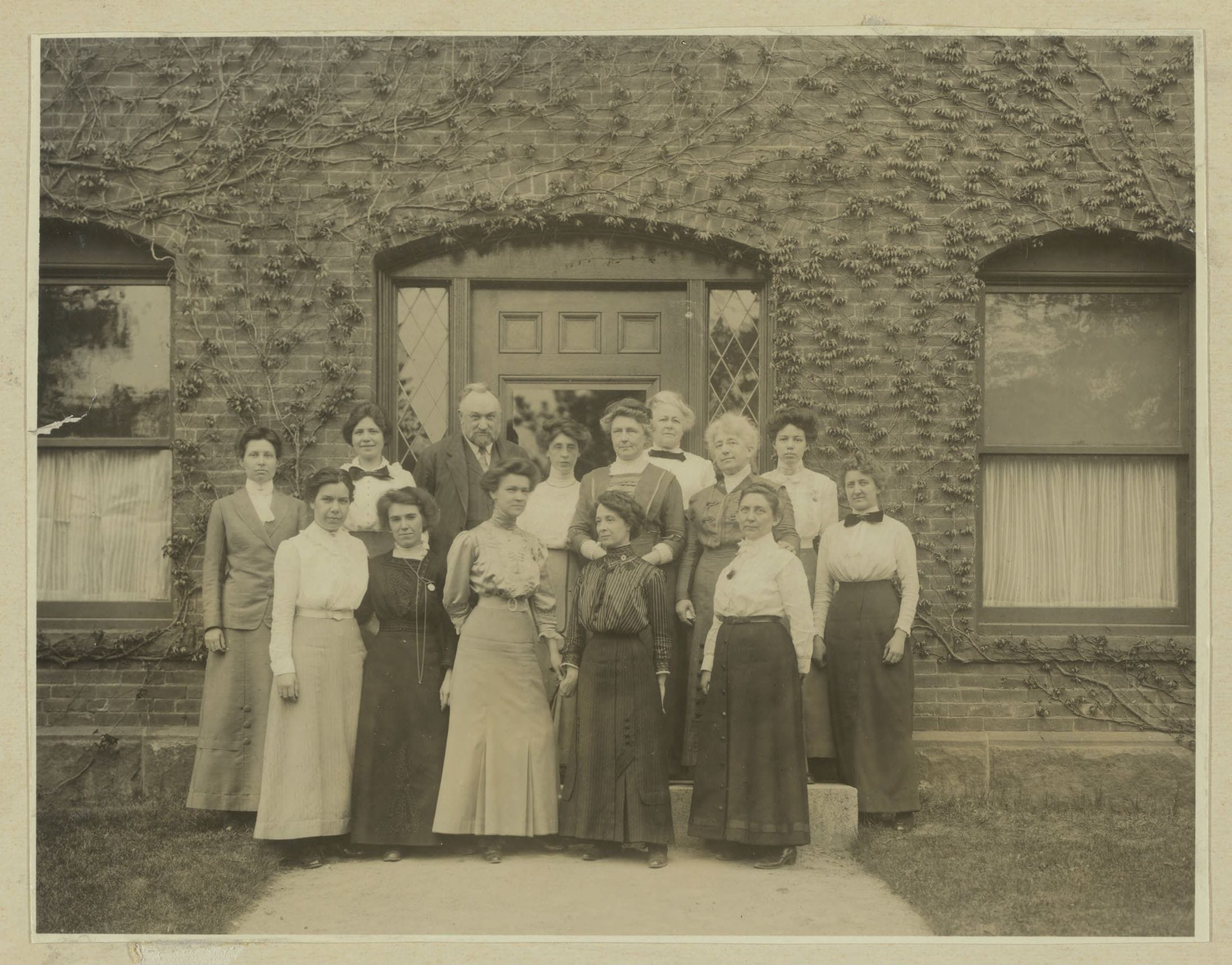
The Harvard Computers in 1913; Harwood is at back left.

In 1912, after graduating from Radcliffe College, Harwood worked at the Harvard Observatory and taught in private schools in the Boston area, including the Volkman School in Boston, the Buckingham School in Cambridge, and Faulkner School, in Dedham. Shortly after, an astronomical fellowship was created for women to work at Maria Mitchell Observatory. Harwood was the first recipient of the fellowship, receiving $1,000. While she was a member of this fellowship, she spent her time traveling between the Mitchell Observatory and the Harvard Observatory, where she would continue her work for both observatories. Although she was given an offer to return to the Mitchell Observatory in 1915, she decided to go to the Lick Observatory in Mt. Hamilton, California, where she could continue her work, and also work towards obtaining her master's degree in astronomy.

In 1916, at 30 years old, Harwood was named director of Mitchell Observatory, and worked there until her retirement in 1957. For many years, she was the first and only woman to be hired as director of the observatory, which was independently funded. Her specialty, photometry, involved measuring variation in the light of stars and asteroids, and she applied it particularly to that of the small planet 433 Eros, which was discovered during her time with the Harvard Observatory. A member of the American Astronomical Society and Fellow of the Royal Astronomical Society, she traveled widely in Europe and the United States. In 1923, she became the first woman to gain access to the Mount Wilson Observatory, and in 1924 was the first woman allowed to use the observatory's 60-inch telescope, the largest in the world at the time.

In 1917, Harwood discovered the asteroid 886 Washingtonia four days before its formal recognition by George Henry Peters. At the time, "senior people around her advised her not to report it as a new discovery because it was inappropriate that a woman should be thrust into the limelight with such a claim". However, Harwood did send her photographs of her discovery to Peters for him to include in his study of the asteroid's orbit. In 1960, an asteroid discovered at Palomar, was named in her honor, 7040 Harwood.

Harwood was a devoted Unitarian. She was a trustee of Nantucket Cottage Hospital and taught at MIT during World War II. She is buried at the Westlawn Cemetery in Littleton.

== Honors ==
Harwood was the first woman to receive an honorary Ph.D. from Oxford University. After her retirement from the Maria Mitchell Observatory in 1957, she was awarded a Graduate Chapter Medal from her alma mater Radcliffe College to commemorate her achievements in astronomy. In 1960, 2642 P-L was discovered by Cornelis Johannes van Houten and Ingrid van Houten-Groeneveld and named Harwood. In 1962, she received the Annie J. Cannon Award in Astronomy.
