= Mary Watson Whitney =

American astronomer (1847–1921)

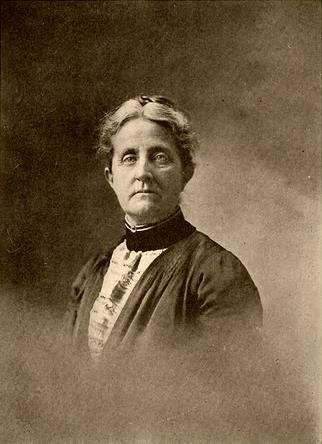
- Born: September 11, 1847; Waltham, Massachusetts, U.S.
- Died: January 21, 1921 (aged 73); Waltham, Massachusetts, U.S.
- Education: Vassar College
- Scientific career
- Fields: Astronomy
- Workplaces: Vassar Observatory

Mary Watson Whitney (September 11, 1847 – January 20, 1921) was an American astronomer and was the head of the Vassar College Observatory for 22 years, where 102 scientific papers were published under her guidance.

== Early life and education ==
Whitney was born on September 11, 1847, in Waltham, Massachusetts. Her parents were Mary Watson Crehore and Samuel Buttrick Whitney, a successful real estate businessman who was wealthy enough to provide her with a good education for a woman at the time. She attended school in Waltham, where she reportedly excelled in mathematics, and graduated from the public high school in 1863. She was privately tutored for one year before she entered Vassar College in 1865, where she met the astronomer Maria Mitchell. During her time at Vassar College, her father died and her brother was lost at sea. She earned her degree in 1868.

From 1869 to 1870, Whitney studied quaternions and celestial mechanics under Benjamin Peirce at Harvard University. Because women were not permitted as students at Harvard at the time, she attended his courses as a guest. She also volunteered at the Harvard College Observatory from 1869 to 1870. In 1871 Whitney was made the first president of Vassar College's alumnae association. She earned a master's degree from Vassar in 1872. She subsequently lived in Zürich for 3 years where she studied mathematics and celestial mechanics.

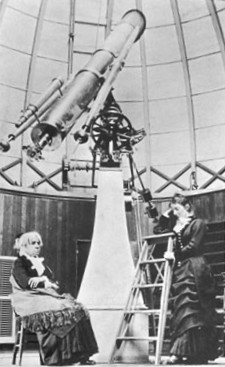
Whitney (right) with Maria Mitchell at the Vassar College Observatory, around 1877

== Professional career ==
After returning to the United States, Whitney became a teacher at Waltham High School between 1876 and 1881 until she became an assistant of Maria Mitchell at Vassar. Upon Mitchell's retirement in 1888, Whitney became a professor and the director of the observatory there until she retired in 1915 for health reasons.

Whitney focused her teaching and research on subjects related to double stars, variable stars, asteroids, comets, and measurements by photographic plates. Under her direction,102 articles were published at the Vassar College Observatory. In 1889, Whitney's mother and sister both became ill and Whitney moved them to the Observatory where she could care for them and continue her work part-time. When they died two years later, she resumed full-time work.

Whitney was a fellow of the American Association for the Advancement of Science and a charter member of the Astronomical and Astrophysical Society. In 1902, she became the first president of the Maria Mitchell Association in Nantucket, Massachusetts.

Whitney believed that science provided strong career opportunities for women. She hoped that women would soon become more active in practical chemistry, architecture, dentistry, and agriculture, which were more lucrative and, in Whitney's view, particularly well suited to women. Moreover, she believed that scientific training would prepare them to be good mothers, falling into more traditional tropes of the early 20th century. She also funded the advancement of women in science. In 1908, when the Maria Mitchell Observatory was built on Nantucket, Whitney raised money to fund a female research fellow. Whitney continued working and living at the Vassar College Observatory until her retirement in 1915. In her will, she bequeathed $5,000 to Vassar to support research by women.

== Later life and legacy ==
Whitney died in Waltham on January 20, 1921, of pneumonia. Whitney was memorialized in 1923 with the unveiling of a bronze bas-relief portrait at the Vassar College Observatory.
