= Class of 1951 Observatory =

Astronomical observatory at Vassar College

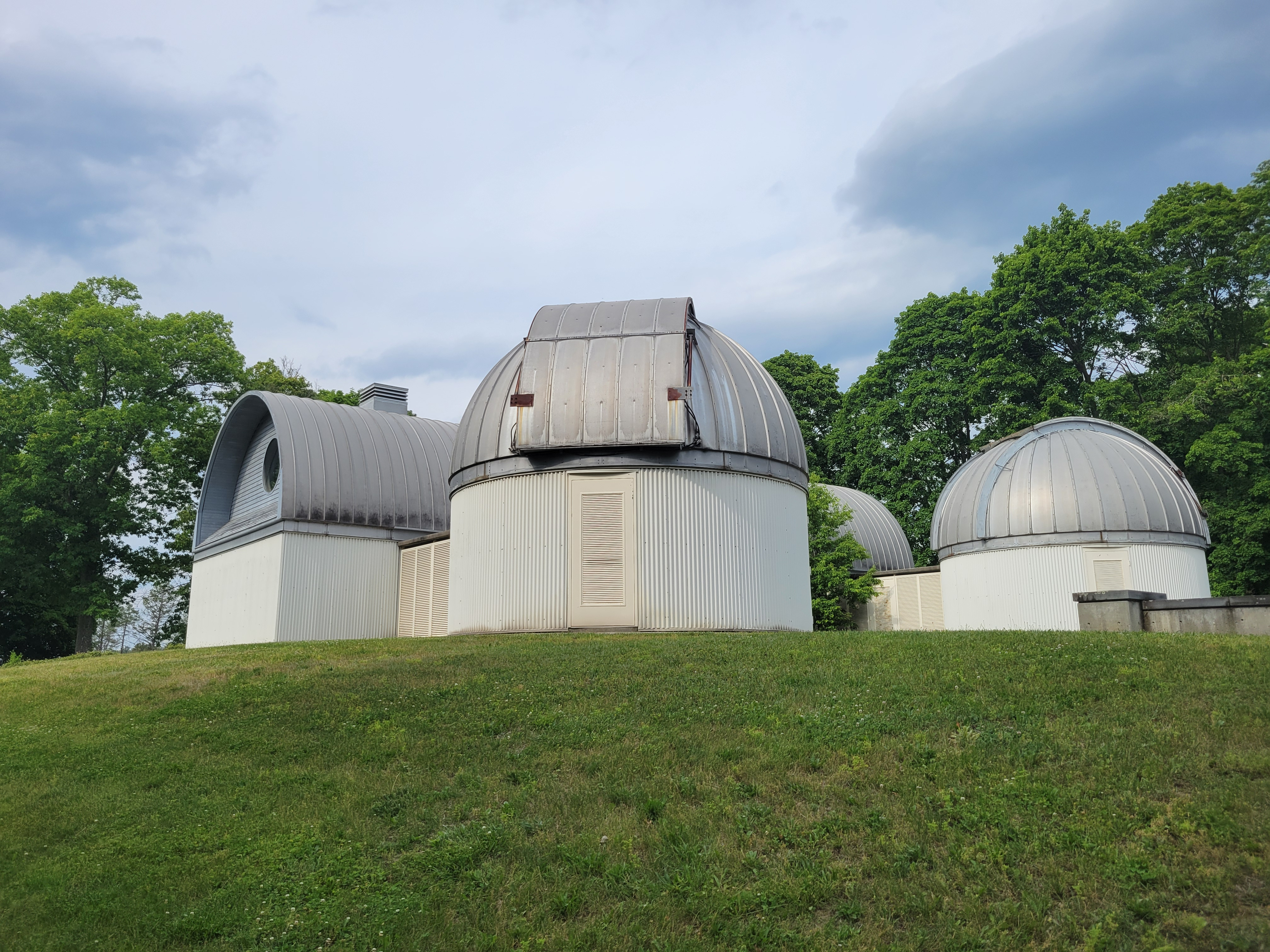
- The observatory in 2026
- Organization: Vassar College
- Location: Poughkeepsie, New York
- Coordinates: 41.683011°N 73.890604°W
- Established: 1997
- Website: Vassar College Observatory

Telescopes
- East Dome: 20-inch reflector
- West Dome: 32-inch reflector
- North Dome: historic 8-inch refractor
- Unnamed: Coronado 5-inch solar telescope
- Related media on Commons

The Class of 1951 Observatory is located near the eastern edge of the town of Poughkeepsie, New York, on Vassar College's campus.

The observatory was built in 1997 and sponsored by the Vassar class of 1951 who donated funds for its construction on the occasion of their forty-fifth reunion. The new observatory replaced the Maria Mitchell Observatory, the first building completed on the college's campus. Roth and Moore Architects designed the new building which consists of three distinct segments: a central connecting area with a half round roof oriented southward, and two domes (one east and one west) that house the telescopes. The observatory facility houses two main telescopes: one 20-inch reflector used primarily for public outreach, and a 32-inch reflector used for teaching and research. It also houses a five-inch solar telescope and an eight-inch refracting telescope.

The 32-inch telescope is tied with the Austin-Fellows telescope of the Stull Observatory at Alfred University for being the 2nd-largest optical telescope in the state of New York, the largest being the 40-inch reflector at SUNY Oneonta College Observatory.

On its exterior the observatory is covered in aluminum sheathing, making the structure less of a heat polluter than its predecessor whose masonry walls absorbed a lot of daytime solar heat. The building's interior is additionally well insulated to give off as little thermal pollution as possible. The Class of 1951 Observatory also houses classrooms and offices which are furnished with laminated wood arches.

The observatory has been known to hold open houses for members of the public.

== See also ==
- List of observatories
