= Maud Worcester Makemson =

American astronomer

Maud Worcester Makemson (September 16, 1891 – December 25, 1977) was an American astronomer, a specialist on archaeoastronomy, and director of Vassar Observatory.

== Early life and education ==
Maud Lavon Worcester was born in 1891 in Center Harbor, New Hampshire. She attended Girls' Latin School in Boston. She briefly attended Radcliffe College, but left to teach school. In high school and college she studied Latin, Greek, French, and German, and during school breaks she independently learned Spanish, Italian, Japanese, and Chinese. In 1911, her family moved to Pasadena, California. She was working as a journalist in Bisbee, Arizona when she took an interest in astronomy. She returned to California and taught school while taking correspondence courses and summer classes to qualify for admission to the University of California. She earned a bachelor's degree from UCLA in 1925, followed by a master's degree in 1927 and a PhD from University of California at Berkeley in 1930. Studying under Armin Leuschner, her doctoral work involved calculating the orbits of asteroids.

== Career ==
In 1930, Makemson became an instructor of astronomy at the University of California before moving to Rollins College to teach mathematics and astronomy.

She joined the Vassar College faculty as an assistant astronomy professor in 1932; she became a full professor in 1944. In 1936, she succeeded Caroline Furness as director of the Vassar Observatory.

She received a Guggenheim Fellowship in 1941 to study Maya astronomy, and was a Fulbright Scholar in Japan and India in 1953-1954. In Japan, she taught three courses at Ochanomizu Women's University in Tokyo on the history of astronomy, "scientific reading," and "Shelly's lyrics." Makemson's interest in non-Western astronomical knowledge resulted in several monographs, The Morning Star Rises: An Account of Polynesian Astronomy (1941), The Astronomical Tables of the Maya (1943), The Maya Correlation Problem (1946), and The Book of the Jaguar Priest (1951, a translation of a sixteenth-century text). Makemson used her translation of The Book of the Jaguar Priest to defend the "correlation between the Maya and Christian calendars."

Makemson retired from Vassar in 1957, then taught astronomy at UCLA. She co-authored a textbook, Introduction to Astrodynamics (1960) with Robert M. L. Baker, Jr. In the 1960s, she joined the Applied Research Laboratories of General Dynamics, to consult with NASA on lunar exploration. She worked on the problem of selenography, developing a way for astronauts standing on the moon to locate themselves precisely.

Among her undergraduate students at Vassar was astronomer Vera Rubin, to whom she gave a celestial globe.

== Personal life ==
Maud Worcester married Thomas Emmet Makemson in 1912; they had three children together before their divorce in 1919. Makemson died on Christmas Day in 1977, in Weatherford, Texas. Her son Donald E. Worcester (who used his mother's original surname) was an author and a history professor at Texas Christian University.
