= 536 Merapi =

Main belt asteroid orbiting the Sun

Discovery
- Discovered by: George Henry Peters
- Discovery site: Washington, D.C.
- Discovery date: 11 May 1904

Designations
- Pronunciation: /məˈrɑːpi/
- Named after: Mount Mĕrapi, West Sumatera
- Alternative designations: 1904 OF
- Adjectives: Merapian

Orbital characteristics
- Epoch 31 July 2016 (JD 2457600.5)
- Uncertainty parameter 0
- Observation arc: 111.94 yr (40885 d)
- Aphelion: 3.7977 AU (568.13 Gm)
- Perihelion: 3.1992 AU (478.59 Gm)
- Semi-major axis: 3.4984 AU (523.35 Gm)
- Eccentricity: 0.085546
- Orbital period (sidereal): 6.54 yr (2390.1 d)
- Mean anomaly: 302.40°
- Mean motion: 0° 9^{m} 2.232^{s} / day
- Inclination: 19.425°
- Longitude of ascending node: 59.239°
- Argument of perihelion: 295.862°

Physical characteristics
- Mean radius: 77.585 ± 1.765 km (composite estimate); 75.71±4.5 km
- Mass: (7.3±7.5)×10^{18} kg (Note: Calculated from its standard gravitational parameter GM = 0.49±0.5 km^{3}/s^{2}.) (SB441)
- Mean density: 4.0–4.1 g/cm^{3} (calculated)
- Synodic rotation period: 8.78 h (0.366 d)
- Geometric albedo: 0.0452±0.006
- Absolute magnitude (H): 8.2

536 Merapi is a main belt asteroid orbiting the Sun. It was discovered by American astronomer George Henry Peters on May 11, 1904, from Washington, D.C.

Photometric observations of this asteroid at the Oakley Observatory in Terre Haute, Indiana, during 2006 gave a light curve with a period of 8.809 ± 0.008 hours and a brightness variation of 0.23 ± 0.05 in magnitude.
