= Herminia Borchard Dassel =

German-American painter (1821–1857)

Herminia Borchard Dassel (born Herminia Borchard; 1821 – December 7, 1857), also known as Hermine Dassel, was a German-American painter, notable for her portraits and genre paintings.

== Biography ==
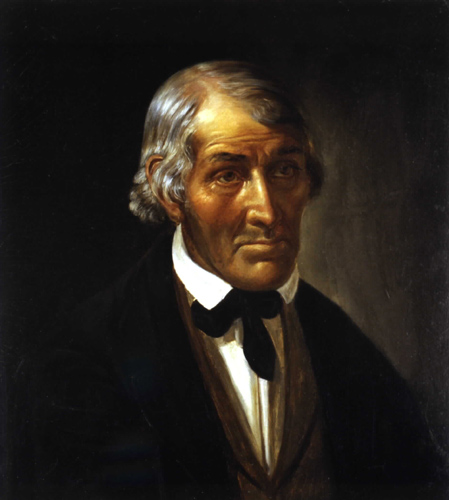
Portrait of Abram Quary, 1851 Portrait of Maria Mitchell, 1851.

=== Early life and education ===
Dassel was born to a wealthy family in Königsberg, Prussia, in 1821. Her father's job as a banker ensured her a privileged upbringing with an emphasis on education. Her father was bankrupted in 1839 and as a result her family lost their fortune, prompting Dassel to sell paintings to financially support her family. Later that year, she moved to Düsseldorf, Germany to study under Karl Ferninand Sohn at the Düsseldorf School of Painting. Dassel left the Düsseldorf School of Painting in 1842 and continued to sell paintings, earning enough money so that she was able to study in Italy. There she painted a number of genre scenes, which gained her recognition throughout the United States and Europe. She was then forced to flee Italy because of the Revolution of 1848, settling in Philadelphia, Pennsylvania in 1849.

=== Career and later life ===
Dassel found a great deal of success upon her arrival in the United States, with her work being displayed in the American Art-Union, Boston Athenaeum, and the National Academy of Design. In June 1850, the National Academy of Design selected her to be one of the first female honorary members.

Dassel married her husband in July 1849 and had three children. She and her family moved to New York in 1850, where she earned her living by painting portraits of members of the upper classes. During this time, she used her personal art studio to become a painting instructor to girls from wealthy families in New York. In her time as a teacher, she was described as being well-liked by all and having a fervent passion for art.

Dassel painted some of her most well-known portraits on a visit to Nantucket in 1851. She took a particular interest in the remaining Native American population on the island, painting the portraits of Abram Quary and Isabella Draper. At the time, Quary was thought to be the last fully Wampanoag person living in Nantucket, and Draper was a young girl of Wampanoag descent. Dassel was also commissioned to paint astronomer Maria Mitchell's portrait while she was in Nantucket.

=== Death ===
Dassel was reported to have been ill shortly before her death on December 7, 1857, aged 35 or 36. She was buried in Greenwood, New York. After her death, Henry Theodore Tuckerman arranged an exhibition and sale of her work, with the profits going toward her children.

== Work ==
- An Italian Flower Girl, 1849
- Mrs. John Taylor Johnston (Frances Colles) and Her Daughter, c. 1850s
- Mrs. James N. Paulding (Emily Pearson), c. 1850s
- Nantucket Indian Princess (originally titled An Indian Girl), 1851 in the Rhode Island Historical Society collection
- Portrait of Abram Quary, 1851
- Portrait of Maria Mitchell, 1851
- Ann Saltonstall Seabury (Mrs. William Walton), 1856
- Ellen, Kezia and Mary Seabury, 1856
