= Stull Observatory =

Observatory in New York state, US

- Organization: Alfred University
- Observatory code: 784
- Location: Alfred, New York, United States
- Coordinates: 42°15′N 77°47′W
- Established: 1966
- Website: http://merlin.alfred.edu/stull.html

Telescopes
- Austin-Fellows Telescope: 32in Newtonian reflector
- The Metzger Telescope: 20in Newtonian reflector
- "Rich" Rose Heleostat: 6in Heliostat
- The Alden Ritchey-Chrétien reflector: 16in Ritchey-Chrétien
- The Rosing: 24 inch Planewave CDK
- 1863 Fitz: 9in refractor

Stull Observatory is an astronomical observatory owned and operated by Alfred University located in Alfred, New York (USA) and named after John Stull, who helped establish the observatory in 1966. It is notable for housing seven independently housed telescopes ranging in size from 8 to 32 inches. The largest, the Austin-Fellows 32 inch Newtonian Reflector is tied with the Vassar College Class of 1951 Observatory for the rank of second largest optical telescope in New York state after the 40 inch telescope at SUNY Oneonta College Observatory. Telescopes at the observatory are regularly opened to the public. The observatory is also used for those pursuing a minor in astronomy or a concentration in astrophysics.

== History ==
The history of the Stull Observatory goes back to 1863, when the astronomer William A. Rogers ordered and donated a 9-inch refractor with the American optician Henry Fitz. Sometime in the 1920s, with astronomy having been neglected at the University, the observatory was torn down and the telescope mothballed. It was very nearly lost and destroyed during this period, but in the late 1950s its existence was made known to John Stull, a ceramic engineering Ph.D. who was teaching physics. Over the next several years the telescope was used at several locations on campus. Finally, in 1966 Stull and the University established an observatory for the telescope.

What is now called the Stull Observatory began with the construction of two domes, one for the 9 inch Fitz telescope and the other for a 16-inch Newtonian reflector. The Fitz was rebuilt in 1970, with a metal tube replacing the badly damaged wooden one. (The original tube is currently being restored by James Gort.) In 1971 the 16 inch Newtonian was replaced with the current 20 inch "Metzger" newtonian.

In the interim, a heated classroom building was constructed (1968) and a 16-inch Ealing "Educator" Cassegrain (the "Grindle") had been purchased (1969), and ultimately modified. 1976 saw the addition of the 14 inch Newtonian (the "Olson") telescope, while the "Rose" heliostat was added in 1978.

In 1992 the 32 inch Newtonian ("Austin-Fellows") telescope was completed. In 1996, due to funding from the National Science Foundation, a computerized telescope control system was installed.

Since 1992 the Observatory has purchased two commercial 8 inch Schmidt-Cassegrain telescopes as well as significant amounts of electronic support equipment.

== See also ==
- List of astronomical observatories
