= Francesco de Vico =

Italian astronomer (1805–1848)

Father Francesco de Vico (also known as de Vigo, De Vico and even DeVico; 19 May 1805 in Macerata – 15 November 1848 in London) was an Italian astronomer and a Jesuit priest.

== Biography ==
He was educated at the college of Urbino, and became in 1835 assistant superintendent, and in 1839 director of the Vatican Observatory. The Revolutions of 1848 in the Italian states cut short his observing career, as he was forced into exile, touring Paris, London, and the United States, where he was received by the President. He was pleased with his reception in the U.S. and wished to settle there at Georgetown College, but first returned to Europe to try to recruit some colleagues to join him and purchase instruments for an observatory to be erected under his direction in New York. Unfortunately, worn out from the travel, he died in London in November of that same year.

== Work ==
He found a remarkable number of comets in a relatively short time, including periodic comets 54P/de Vico-Swift-NEAT and 122P/de Vico. He also independently discovered the comet (C/1847 T1) that brought fame to Maria Mitchell as "Miss Mitchell's Comet", two days after she did. The news did not reach Europe before Father De Vico announced his observation, so it was initially named for him. He received the award from the Danish king, who had offered a prize for the first comet discovered through a telescope (prior to this time, all comet discoveries were ones that could be seen by the unaided eye). Mitchell was later recognized and awarded a medal as well.

He also made observations of Saturn and the gaps in its rings (he was the first to see the narrow division in the rings of Saturn now known as the Keeler Gap after James Keeler). He was noted for his studies of spots on Venus, and unsuccessfully attempted to determine its rotation period.

He began an ambitious project to compile an atlas of stars down to 11th magnitude.

He was also a composer of church music.

The lunar crater De Vico is named after him.

The asteroid 20103 de Vico and the Osservatorio di Monte D’Aria di Serrapetrona are named after him.

== Obituary ==
- MNRAS 9 (1849) 65

== See also ==
- Comet de Vico (disambiguation)
- List of Roman Catholic scientist-clerics
