= Nantucket Public Schools =

School district in Massachusetts, United States

Location
- Nantucket, Massachusetts United States

District information
- Type: Public
- Grades: PK-12
- Established: 1716
- Superintendent: W. Michael Cozort
- Schools: 4 (2011)

Students and staff
- Students: 1,289 (2011)
- Teachers: 117.5 (2011)
- Student–teacher ratio: 11.0 to 1 (2011)

Other information
- Website: www.npsk.org

Nantucket Public Schools (NPS) is a school district on the island Nantucket, Massachusetts, United States.

== Fundamentals ==
The Nantucket Public Schools district was founded to educate and serve the small island, and four public schools are currently a part of it, including the Nantucket Elementary School, Cyrus Peirce Middle School, Nantucket High School, and Nantucket Community School. The Nantucket Public Schools is a department of the town operated under laws pertaining to education and under regulations of the Massachusetts Department of Education. The area served by the Nantucket Public Schools is coterminous with the Town of Nantucket. The school district consists of many departments, including a Facilities Department, Department of Special Services, Athletics Department, and Technology Department.

The school district has allowed the community to elect members for their committee. Their responsibilities include: establishing the educational philosophy of Nantucket Public Schools; making the educational policy; adopting curriculum; evaluating the educational program; establishing the regulations for governing and operation of the district; and hiring, evaluating, and (if necessary) dismissing the superintendent. Meetings are held the first and third Tuesday of each month at 6:00pm in the Nantucket High School Cafeteria, and members encourage the public to join them for their meetings. All meetings are taped and view-able on a local TV station.

== Superintendent ==
W. Michael Cozort was born in Heidelberg, Germany, has been married to his wife, Martha, for thirty-seven years, and has two children, Abigail and Elizabeth, who are working and living in the Boston area. He has traveled all around the globe, taking the chance to study educational structures in countries like China and Japan. He adores hedgehogs and his wife.

Prior to accepting the position as Superintendent of Schools for the Nantucket Public Schools, Cozort was the Superintendent for the Shaker Regional School District in New Hampshire. In that capacity, he led the district to a standard of excellence in which three of the four schools were named New Hampshire School of the Year, two of its teachers were named NH Teacher of the Year, and the School Board was recognized as NH School Board of the Year. Cozort was recognized as the NH Superintendent of the Year in 2005. Cozort had previously served as the Assistant Superintendent and the Elementary Principal in that same district. His previous experience was as a Principal, Assistant Principal and teacher in the White Mountain Regional School District in Lancaster, NH. Cozort began his career in education as a teacher of history at an inner city high school in Jacksonville, Florida.

In addition to his duties as a superintendent, Cozort was a Governing Board Member for the American Association of School Administrators (AASA) from 2005-2010, and he served on the Executive Board of the NH School Administrators Association from 1999-2009 and as its president in 2006-2007. Cozort was active in school athletics, serving as a coach of varsity men’s soccer and women’s basketball and proudly served as an Executive Council Member for the New Hampshire Interscholastic Athletic Association from 1999-2010. He continues to be an avid sports fan and active participant in men’s soccer, a sport that he once was invited to participate in the US Olympic Soccer Trials.

== See also ==
- List of school districts in Massachusetts
- Nantucket High School
- Maria Mitchell Observatory
- Maria Mitchell Association
- Nantucket, Massachusetts
- Nantucket Historic District
