= 980 Anacostia =

Main-belt asteroid

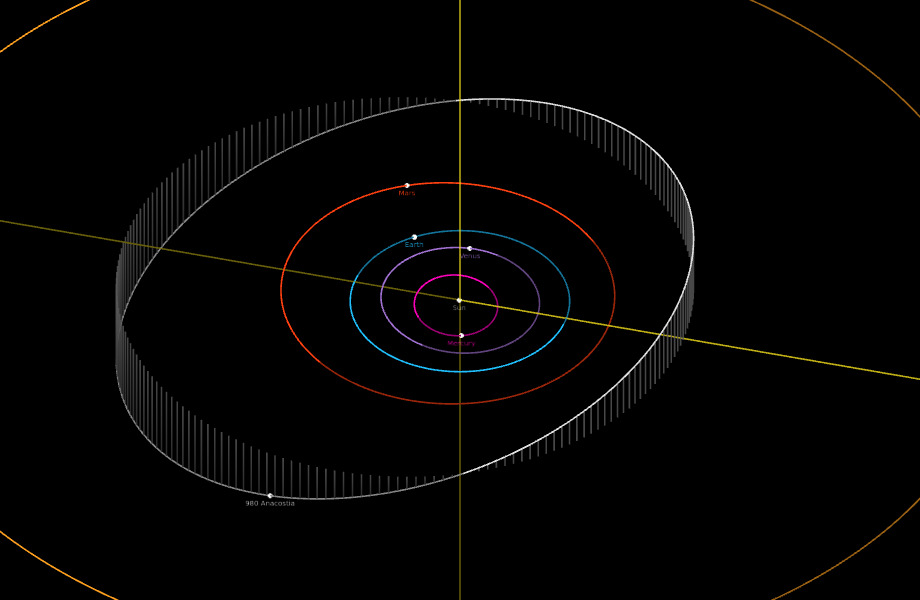
- Orbit diagram of 980 Anacostia

Discovery
- Discovered by: George Henry Peters
- Discovery site: Washington, D.C.
- Discovery date: 21 November 1921

Designations
- Pronunciation: /ænəˈkɒstiə/
- Alternative designations: 1921 W19

Orbital characteristics
- Epoch 31 July 2016 (JD 2457600.5)
- Uncertainty parameter 0
- Observation arc: 87.01 yr (31782 days)
- Aphelion: 3.2953 AU (492.97 Gm)
- Perihelion: 2.1842 AU (326.75 Gm)
- Semi-major axis: 2.7397 AU (409.85 Gm)
- Eccentricity: 0.20278
- Orbital period (sidereal): 4.53 yr (1656.4 d)
- Mean anomaly: 317.515°
- Mean motion: 0° 13^{m} 2.424^{s} / day
- Inclination: 15.905°
- Longitude of ascending node: 285.817°
- Argument of perihelion: 70.143°

Physical characteristics
- Mean radius: 43.095±0.8 km
- Mass: (1.0±1.0)×10^{18} kg (Note: Calculated from its standard gravitational parameter GM = 0.07±0.07 km^{3}/s^{2}.) (SB441)
- Mean density: 3.1±3.1 g/cm^{3} (calculated)
- Synodic rotation period: 20.117 h (0.8382 d)
- Geometric albedo: 0.1723±0.006
- Absolute magnitude (H): 7.85

980 Anacostia is a minor planet orbiting the Sun that was discovered by American astronomer George Henry Peters on 21 November 1921. The name recognizes the Anacostia River and an historic neighborhood of the same name in the city of Washington, D.C.

Measurements using the adaptive optics system at the W. M. Keck Observatory give a diameter of 70 ± 6 km. This is 23% smaller than the diameter estimated from the IRAS observatory data. The size ratio between the major and minor axes is 1.09.

Polarimetric study of this asteroid reveals anomalous properties that suggests the regolith consists of a mixture of low and high albedo material. This may have been caused by fragmentation of an asteroid substrate with the spectral properties of CO3/CV3 carbonaceous chondrites.
