= Pierce Middle School =

Pierce Middle School may refer to:

- William G. Pierce Middle School, Hillsborough County, Florida
- Pierce Middle School, Grosse Pointe Park, Michigan
- John D. Pierce Middle School, Redford, Michigan
- Pierce Middle School, Waterford, Michigan
- Pierce Middle School, part of the same district as Milton High School.

== See also ==
- Peirce Middle School (disambiguation)
