= 886 Washingtonia =

Main-belt asteroid

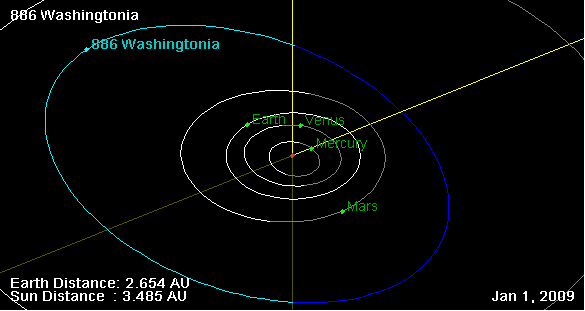

Discovery
- Discovered by: George Henry Peters
- Discovery site: Washington, D.C.
- Discovery date: 16 November 1917

Designations
- Alternative designations: 1917 b

Orbital characteristics
- Epoch 31 July 2016 (JD 2457600.5)
- Uncertainty parameter 0
- Observation arc: 105.87 yr (38670 days)
- Aphelion: 4.0269 AU (602.42 Gm)
- Perihelion: 2.3205 AU (347.14 Gm)
- Semi-major axis: 3.1737 AU (474.78 Gm)
- Eccentricity: 0.26882
- Orbital period (sidereal): 5.65 yr (2065.1 d)
- Mean anomaly: 217.593°
- Mean motion: 0° 10^{m} 27.552^{s} / day
- Inclination: 16.846°
- Longitude of ascending node: 58.918°
- Argument of perihelion: 301.838°
- Earth MOID: 1.36733 AU (204.550 Gm)
- Jupiter MOID: 1.67995 AU (251.317 Gm)
- T_{Jupiter}: 3.079

Physical characteristics
- Mean radius: 45.28±6.3 km
- Mass: (1.36±0.42)×10^{18} kg (Note: Calculated from its standard gravitational parameter GM = 0.091±0.028 km^{3}/s^{2}.)
- Mean density: 3.97 g/cm^{3} (Note: Assuming a diameter of 86.8 km.)
- Synodic rotation period: 9.001 h (0.3750 d)
- Geometric albedo: 0.0713±0.025
- Apparent magnitude: 12.5 to 16.5
- Absolute magnitude (H): 9.3

886 Washingtonia is a minor planet orbiting the Sun. It was discovered on 16 November 1917, from Washington, D.C., and is named after the 1st President of the United States, George Washington. Washingtonia may be a "fresh asteroid" that had its surface refreshed within the last 10 million years via collision(s).

== Discovery circumstances ==
Credit for the discovery of 886 Washingtonia has been given to George Peters of the US Naval Observatory, who was the first to report it. The object was, however, observed four days earlier by Margaret Harwood, who was advised not to report it as a new discovery because "it was inappropriate that a woman should be thrust into the limelight with such a claim". The first woman to be credited with the discovery of a minor planet was Pelageya Fedorovna Shajn, eleven years later.
