= Eileen Friel =

American astronomer

Eileen Dolores Friel is an American astronomer specializing in the metallicity of star clusters. She is a former director of the Maria Mitchell Observatory and Lowell Observatory, and a professor emeritus of astronomy at Indiana University.

== Education and career ==
Friel was a physics major at the College of William & Mary. After going to the University of Cambridge for Part III of the Mathematical Tripos, she returned to the US for doctoral study in astronomy and astrophysics at the University of California, Santa Cruz. Her dissertation, A study of the stellar populations in two high galactic latitude fields with comparison to galaxy models, was completed in 1986 under the supervision of Robert Kraft.

After postdoctoral research positions at the Paris Observatory, NRC Herzberg Astronomy and Astrophysics Research Centre, and University of Hawaii, she served as director of the Maria Mitchell Observatory for five years. She moved to the National Science Foundation as a program director in the Division of Astronomical Sciences, and served there as deputy director of the division for many years. In 2009 she was named director of the Lowell Observatory; however, she stepped down a year later, and moved to Indiana University in 2011.

== Recognition ==
Friel was named a Fellow of the American Association for the Advancement of Science in 2009, "for distinguished service to the astronomical community as Executive Officer of the Astronomical Section at the National Science Foundation (NSF), and for diligently mentoring many young scientists in the Research Experiences for Undergraduates program". In 2020, Indiana University gave her their Bicentennial Medal.
