= Maria Mitchell Association =

Non-profit organization in Nantucket, Massachusetts

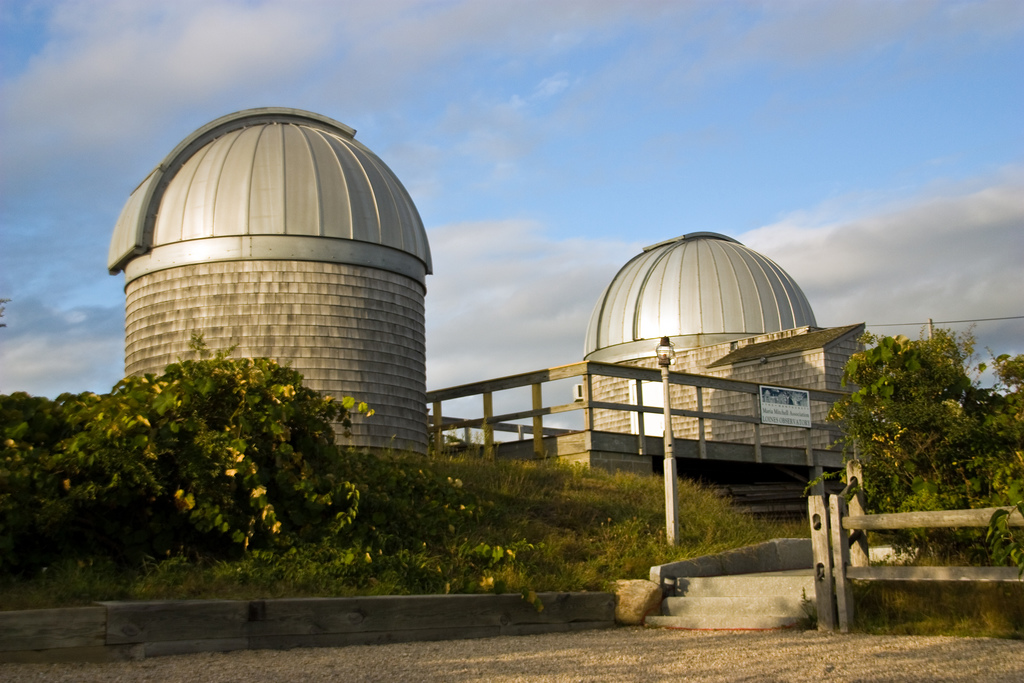
Loines Observatory of the Maria Mitchell Association

The Maria Mitchell Association is a private non-profit organization on the island of Nantucket off the coast of Massachusetts. The association owns the Maria Mitchell Observatory, a second observatory (the Loines Observatory), a Natural History Museum, the Maria Mitchell Aquarium at Nantucket Harbor, a history museum that is the birthplace of Maria Mitchell, and a Science Library. Staff members of the Maria Mitchell Association conduct research into topics as varied as astrophysics and the American burying beetle, among other scientific topics. The properties offer a variety of science and history-related programming and are on the National Register of Historic Places, along with the rest of the island.

== Components and buildings ==
The Maria Mitchell Association's buildings are located in various areas on the island, including four that are adjacent to each other on the hill in Natucket town. These include the Historic Mitchell House located at 1 Vestal Street. It preserves the birthplace of Maria Mitchell, and contains many heirlooms of Maria Mitchell and her family. The Science Library located at 2 Vestal Street houses archives and special collections. The Natural Science Museum, at the corner of Milk and Vestal Streets, has several rooms of permanent and temporary exhibits, as well as a shop with books and gifts. The main Vestal Street Observatory, at 3 Vestal Street, includes the offices of the two working astronomers and has a few exhibits such as Maria Mitchell's famed telescope. The Loines Observatory at 59 Milk Street is used primarily for research and on clear nights offers viewings to the public. An aquarium and shop is located at 28 Washington Street, down the hill at Nantucket Harbor.

Admission is charged for the public to visit each site, for programs, and for membership. A discounted special ticket is available during the summer for sale to the public to see the House, Museum, Vestal Observatory, and Aquarium for one price. Tours are offered every day during the summer at 11:00 a.m.

=== The Historic Mitchell House ===
The Historic Mitchell House preserves the birthplace of Maria Mitchell. It was built in 1790, and occupied by the Mitchell family from 1818, the year of Maria Mitchell's birth. The house contains many artifacts of Maria Mitchell and her family, including a tall-case clock and one of her telescopes.

The research library includes Mitchell's papers, as well as other historical and scientific material. The house remains very much in its original condition with original decorative paint. Guided tours are provided to the public in-season and children's and adult history classes and historic preservation workshops are offered. The research library includes Mitchell's personal and work related papers, her personal library, the papers and libraries of her family, and the special collection library which includes rare books concerning astronomy, the natural sciences, and Nantucket, some dating back to the 1600s. The archives and special collections are open by appointment only for research purposes.

=== Hinchman House Natural Science Museum ===
See main article: Hinchman House

The Natural Science Museum is across the street from Mitchell House. It showcases displays of animals such as snakes, frogs, and turtles. Furthermore, the museum features a gift shop and various displays related to natural science. The building containing the museum has three floors, of which only the first floor is accessible to the public.

=== MMA (Nantucket) Aquarium ===
See main article: Maria Mitchell Aquarium

The MMA Aquarium, also known as the Nantucket Aquarium, is on the site of the historic ticket office of the former Nantucket Railroad at 28 Washington Street. It is located at directly on the shoreline of the Nantucket Harbor, which empties out into the Nantucket Sound. Specimens are primarily drawn from the waters around Nantucket, and are released back to those waters at the end of each summer. Because the Gulf Stream passes by the Atlantic Ocean side of the island, some tropical fish are frequently on exhibit. The aquarium offers programs, including a "feeding frenzy".

=== Loines and Vestal Streets Observatories ===
Loines Observatory was built in 1968 and 1998, the two domes of this facility house a refurbished antique 8-inch Clark telescope and a new 24-inch research telescope. It serves as both an active research observatory and venue for public astronomical programs.

The Vestal Street Observatory has been the site of research, lectures, and other programs. since 1908.

Maria Mitchell Association's observatories are open for regular public tours, programs, lectures, and also host to several special events throughout the year.

== History ==
The Maria Mitchell Association (MMA) was founded in 1902 to preserve the legacy of Nantucket native, astronomer, naturalist, librarian, and educator, Maria Mitchell. After she discovered a comet in 1847, Mitchell's international fame led to many achievements and awards, including an appointment as the first American professor of Astronomy at Vassar College. Mitchell died in 1889.

== Programs ==
Each summer, the MMA offers the Summer Discovery Classes Program for children of various ages, and during the school year to the Nantucket Public Schools. The MMA also offers environmental education programs for families as well as astronomy and natural science programs for adults.

The MMA also offers lesson plans, and programs to teachers in local school systems.

== Major staff and research ==
The staff members of the association conduct research into a wide variety of topics from galaxy formation and star clusters, to spiders, molluscs, and the American burying beetle. They have mentored scientists.

The staff of the Maria Mitchell Association includes:

- Joanna Roche executive director
- Jackie Milingo: director of astronomy
- Laura Pless Freedman: operations manager
- Jónelle Gurley: director of science and programs and interim director of education
- Molly Hess Mosscrop: marketing director
- Amy Young: development and events manager
- Jascin Leonardo Finger: deputy director and curator of the Mitchell House, archives and special collections
- Katherine Robinson Grieder: finance director
- Gary Walker: consultant
- Ginger Andrews: field ornithologist
- Dr. Valerie Hall: research associate
- Andrew Mckenna-Foster: adjunct associate
