= C/1847 T1 (Mitchell) =

Hyperbolic comet

Discovery
- Discovered by: Maria Mitchell
- Discovery site: Nantucket, Massachusetts
- Discovery date: 1 October 1847

Designations
- Alternative designations: Miss Mitchell's Comet; 1847 VI

Orbital characteristics
- Epoch: 26 October 1847 (JD 2395960.5)
- Observation arc: 74 days
- Number of observations: 77
- Perihelion: 0.329 au
- Eccentricity: 1.000172
- Inclination: 108.13°
- Longitude of ascending node: 192.967°
- Argument of periapsis: 276.609°
- Last perihelion: 14 November 1847

Miss Mitchell's Comet, formally designated as C/1847 T1, is a non-periodic comet that American astronomer Maria Mitchell discovered in 1847.

The discovery was initially credited to Francesco de Vico. Vico, observing from Rome, was the first to report the comet's discovery in Europe. However, Mitchell observed the comet two days before Vico did, so she became recognized as the comet's discoverer.

The comet had a weakly hyperbolic orbit solution while inside the planetary region of the Solar System. An orbit solution when the comet is outside of the planetary region shows that the comet is bound to the Sun.
