= George Henry Peters =

American astronomer

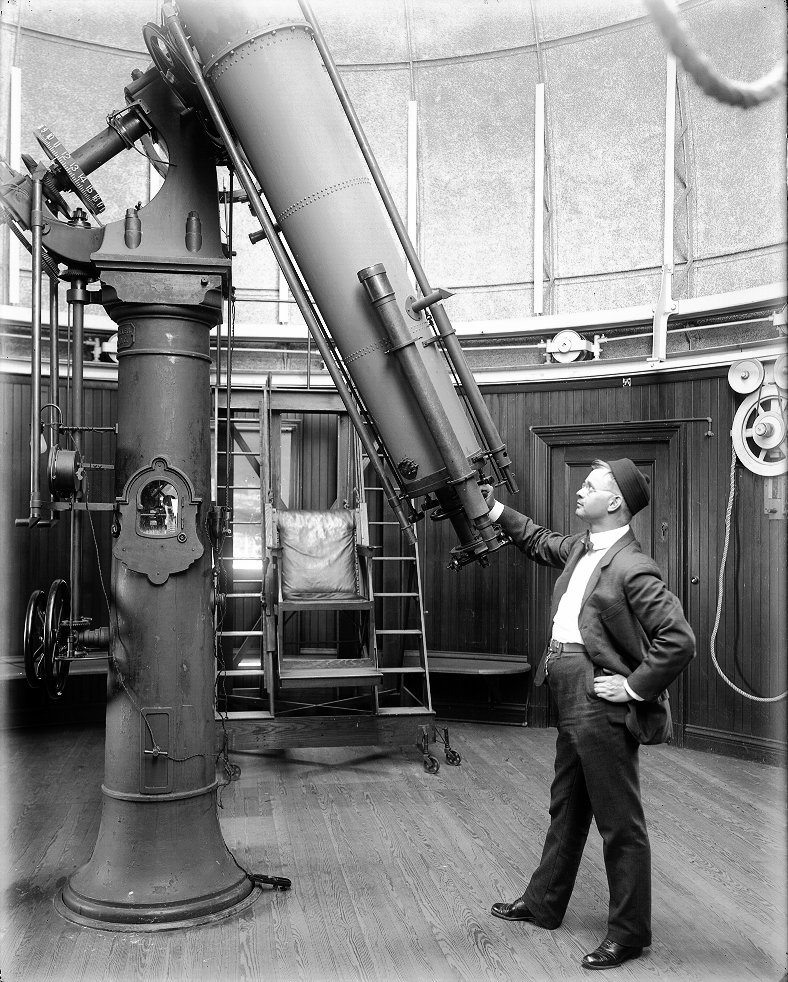
George Henry Peters (approx. 1920)

Asteroids discovered: 3
| 536 Merapi | May 11, 1904 | MPC |
| 886 Washingtonia | November 16, 1917 | MPC |
| 980 Anacostia | November 21, 1921 | MPC |

George Henry Peters (1863–October 18, 1947) was a US astronomer and a discoverer of minor planets.

He worked at the U.S. Naval Observatory as an astrophotographer, discovering three asteroids and photographing the Sun's corona. He died in Washington, D.C.
