= Caroline Furness =

American astronomer

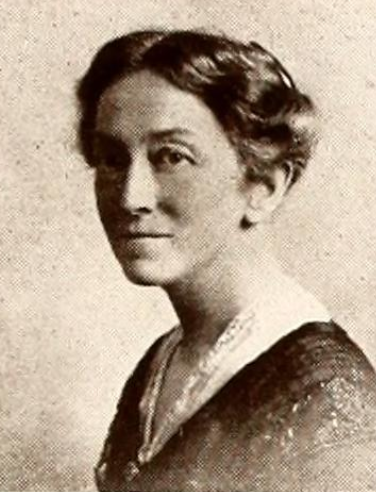
- Caroline Furness, from the 1917 yearbook of Vassar College
- Born: June 24, 1869; Cleveland, Ohio, U.S.
- Died: February 9, 1936; New York, U.S.
- Occupation(s): Astronomer, college professor

Caroline Ellen Furness (June 24, 1869 – February 9, 1936) was an American astronomer who taught at Vassar College in the early twentieth century. She studied under Mary Watson Whitney at Vassar and was the first woman to earn a PhD in astronomy from Columbia University.

== Early life and education ==
Furness was born on 24 June 1869 in Cleveland, Ohio. Her father was a high school science teacher and encouraged her early interest in science. She graduated from Vassar in 1891. Furness worked as a mathematics teacher at West Winsted High School in Connecticut for one year before moving to Columbus, Ohio, where she spent two more years teaching. While living in Columbus, she studied mathematics at Ohio State University. In 1894, she returned to Vassar as a research assistant for Mary Watson Whitney. Under Whitney she took part in a nearly decade long program of comet and planet observations. She became an instructor of mathematics at Vassar in 1895. With the facilitation of Whitney and financial support from Catherine Wolfe Bruce and Frederic Thompson, she began working at Columbia University under Harold Jacoby in 1896 and would publish her Ph.D. dissertation "Catalogue of stars within one degree of the North pole and optical distortion of the Helsingfors astro-photographic telescope deduced from photographic measures" there in 1900.

== Professional career ==
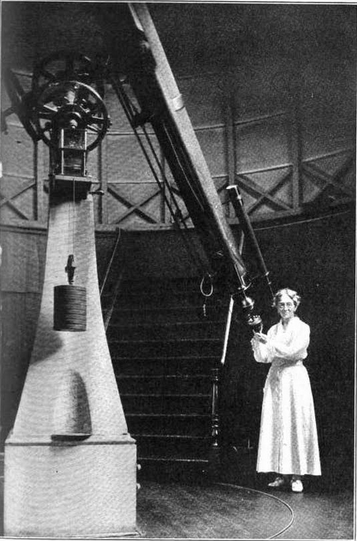
Caroline Ellen Furness (1918)

In 1903 she returned to Vassar as an instructor. In 1911 she was promoted to the position of associate professor in astronomy. From 1901 to 1912 she was the editor of Observations of Variable Stars Made at Vassar College.

She collaborated on variable star observations with Whitney from 1909 to 1911. In 1910, when Whitney began a leave of absence for illness, Furness became chair of the astronomy department and took over the direction of the Vassar College Observatory, before officially becoming director in 1915 upon Whitney's retirement. In 1915, she authored the authoritative textbook Introduction to the Study of Variable Stars, which was recognized as "among the best one hundred books written by American women during the last century" at the Century of Progress Exposition. In 1916 she became Alumna Maria Mitchell Professor of Astronomy.

She became a fellow of the Royal Astronomical Society in 1922. Furness was also a member of the Astronomical Society and the Association of Variable Star Observers. She was a fellow of the British Astronomical Association and the Astronomische Gesselschaft.

Furness was an advocate for women's education, particularly in other countries. She wrote a number of articles about the situation of women's higher education in Japan, and was an important member of the local branch of the National Alliance of Unitarian Women. Furness worked as a volunteer traveling agent for the Red Cross in 1917.

== Personal life ==
She died on 9 February 1936 in New York City.
