= Comet de Vico =

The name Comet de Vico may refer to one of these comets:

- 54P/de Vico–Swift–NEAT, discovered on 23 August 1844
- 122P/de Vico, discovered 20 February 1846
- C/1845 D1 (de Vico)
- C/1846 B1 (de Vico)
- C/1846 O1 (de Vico-Hind)
- C/1846 S1 (de Vico)
