= Maria Mitchell Observatory =

Observatory in Nantucket, Massachusetts, US

Coordinates: 41°16′50.4″N 70°06′15.7″W

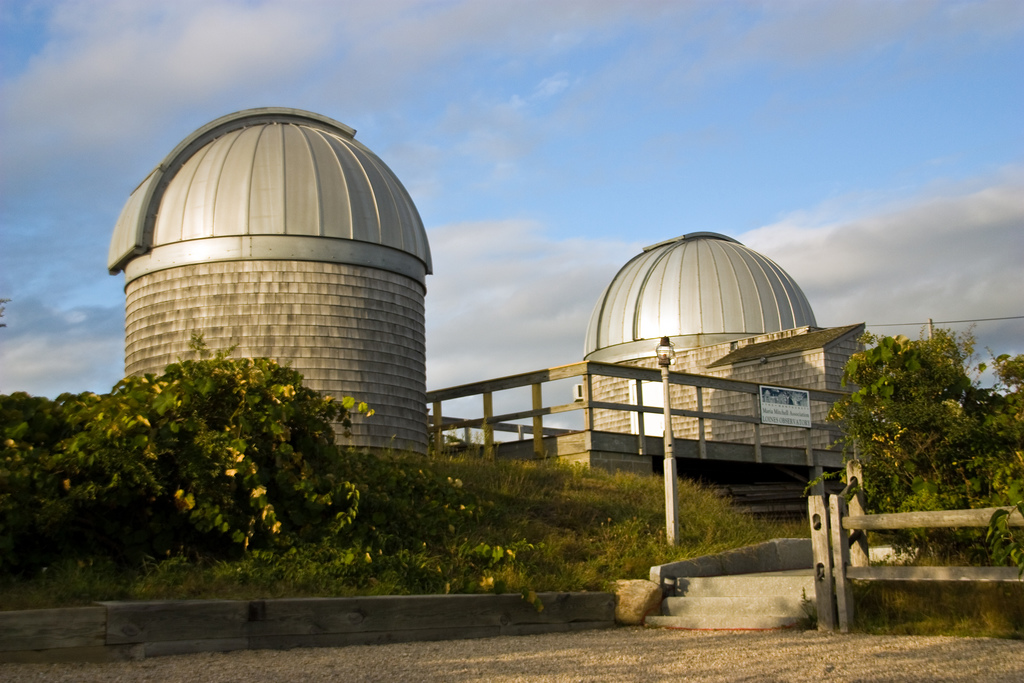
Loines Observatory of the Maria Mitchell Association

The Maria Mitchell Observatory is in Nantucket, Massachusetts, United States. It was founded in 1908 and named in honor of Maria Mitchell, the first American woman astronomer. It is a major component of the Maria Mitchell Association. The facility actually consists of two observatories - the main Maria Mitchell Observatory near downtown Nantucket and the Loines Observatory about a kilometer west of town. It is also the repository for a valuable collection of over 8,000 wide-field (13° x 16°) glass photographic plates, recording observations of large swaths of sky from 1913 to 1995.

The observatory has extensive public education and research programs. For more than 50 years, the observatory has offered summer research internships in astronomy and astrophysics for undergraduate students, funded by the National Science Foundation. The importance of this work was recognized with a 2009 Presidential Award for Excellence in Science, Mathematics, and Engineering Mentoring, given by President Barack Obama to the Maria Mitchell Association.

The two observatories consist of three domed telescopes. The Vestal street location houses research offices as well as the 17-inch Plane Wave Dall-Kirkham telescope. This telescope was installed in 2008 after the completion of the Loines Observatory. The Loines Observatory houses the historic 7.5-inch Alvan Clark refractor, which is used for public stargazing. At this location there is also the larger 24-inch Richey-Chretian reflecting telescope, installed in 2006, which has been made accessible for public tours. Both the 17-inch and the 24-inch telescopes are also used for research year round.

== Staff ==
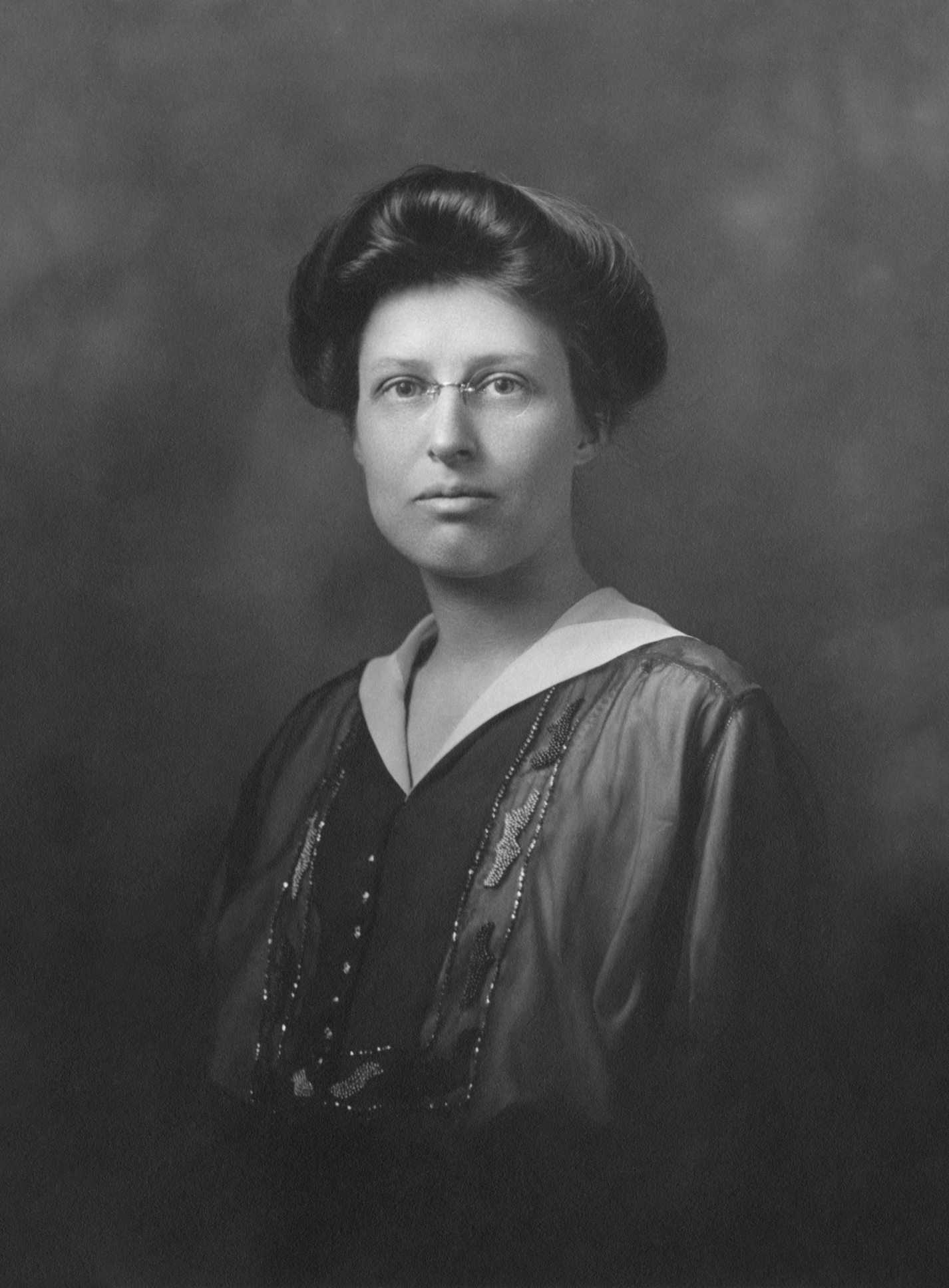
The observatory's first director, Margaret Harwood

Regina Jorgenson became the director of the Maria Mitchell Observatory in January, 2016. She received her PhD in physics from the University of California, San Diego, for a thesis on physical conditions in damped Lyman-alpha systems. She previously held the following positions: postdoctoral research fellow at the Institute of Astronomy (IoA), University of Cambridge, UK (2008–2011); NSF Astronomy & Astrophysics postdoctoral fellow at the Institute for Astronomy (IfA), University of Hawai`i at Manoa (2011–2014), and visiting professor at Willamette University, Oregon (2014–2015). In 2014, she published with coauthors an estimate of the primordial abundance of deuterium.

Past directors of the observatory:

- Margaret Harwood (1912–1957)
- Dorrit Hoffleit (1957–1978)
- Emilia Pisani Belserene (1978–1991)
- Eileen Friel (1991–1996)
- Vladimir Strelnitski (1997–2013)
- Michael West (2013–2015)

Astronomer Gary Walker is the observatory's telescope engineer. An aeronautical engineer by training, he has spent more than 30 years observing, building telescopes and observatories, photographing the heavens, and making photometric measurements of variable stars with CCD cameras. He is a past president of the American Association of Variable Star Observers (AAVSO).

== See also ==
- List of astronomical observatories
