= SUNY Oneonta College Observatory =

Observatory in New York state, US

SUNY Oneonta Observatory at College Camp
- Organization: State University of New York at Oneonta
- Location: Oneonta, New York (USA)
- Coordinates: 42.497162°N 75.060235°W

Telescopes
- Main telescope: 1m (40") Newtonian reflector
- Secondary telescope 1: 16" Schmidt-Cassegrain
- Secondary telescope 2: 14" Schmidt-Cassegrain

The SUNY Oneonta Observatory is an astronomical observatory in Oneonta, New York, home to the state's largest optical telescope and one of the largest publicly open east of the Mississippi, a one-meter (40 inch) Newtonian reflector constructed by JMI Telescopes of Lakewood, Colorado.

The JMI website quotes the cost of the telescope at $159,000. The JMI design is more cost-effective than other telescopes because of its Dobsonian mount and optical system. SUNY Oneonta acquired the telescope in 2006 for less than $150,000. After construction of a new dedicated observatory building, the telescope had a "first light" ceremony on May 30, 2009.

The observatory is located off the main campus of SUNY Oneonta at the Oneonta College Camp, and contains several instruments. There is a 16-inch Meade LX200 Schmidt-Cassegrain telescope (SCT) and a 14-inch Celestron CGE1400 Schmidt-Cassegrain telescope, each housed under separate domes and permanently mounted. Also available for observing are two 8-inch Celestron NexStar SCTs, a 10-inch Orion XT10 Dobsonian, an 11-inch Celestron CGE1100, and JMI RB-66 reverse binoculars. For data acquisition, students can use a research-grade SBIG STL-1001E CCD imaging system, a high-resolution SBIG spectrograph, and a photoelectric photometer. The college hosts regular public viewing sessions, generally on designated dates once a month year-round.

== See also ==
- List of observatories
