= Maria Mitchell =

American astronomer (1818–1889)

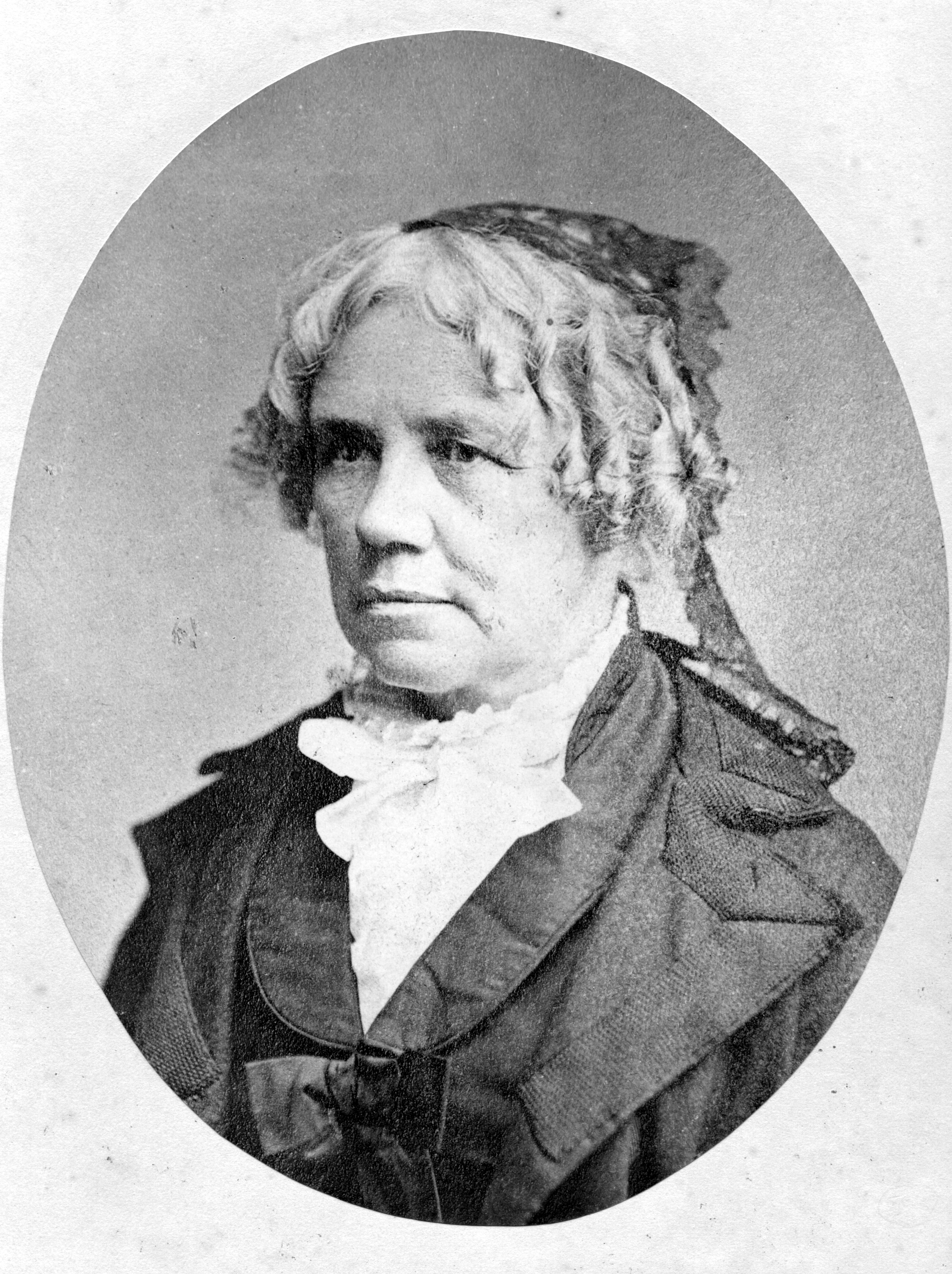
- Born: August 1, 1818; Nantucket, Massachusetts, U.S.
- Died: June 28, 1889 (aged 70); Lynn, Massachusetts, U.S.
- Known for: Discovery of C/1847 T1; First female American professional astronomer
- Awards: King of Denmark's Cometary Prize Medal (1848)
- Scientific career
- Fields: Astronomy
- Workplaces: Nautical Almanac Office; Vassar College; Vassar College Observatory
- Notable students: Margaretta Palmer; Mary Watson Whitney

Maria Mitchell (/məˈraɪə/ mə-RY-ə; (August 1, 1818 – June 28, 1889) was American astronomer, librarian, naturalist, and educator. In 1847, she discovered a comet named 1847 VI (modern designation C/1847 T1) that was later known as "Miss Mitchell's Comet" in her honor. She won a gold medal prize for her discovery, which was presented to her by King Christian VIII of Denmark in 1848. Mitchell was the first internationally known woman to work as both a professional astronomer and a professor of astronomy after accepting a position at Vassar College in 1865. She was also the first woman elected Fellow of the American Academy of Arts and Sciences and the American Association for the Advancement of Science.

Mitchell is the namesake of the Maria Mitchell Association, the Maria Mitchell Observatory, and the Maria Mitchell Aquarium.

== Early years (1818–1846) ==
Maria Mitchell was born on August 1, 1818, on the island of Nantucket, Massachusetts, to Lydia Coleman Mitchell, a library worker, and William Mitchell, a schoolteacher and amateur astronomer. The third of ten children, Mitchell and her siblings were raised in the Quaker religion. William Mitchell educated all his children about nature and astronomy and her mother's employment at two libraries gave them access to a variety of knowledge. Mitchell reportedly showed an early interest and talent in astronomy and mathematics. Her father taught her to operate a number of astronomical instruments including chronometers, sextants, refracting telescopes, and Dollond telescopes. Mitchell often assisted her father in his work with local seamen and in his observations of the night sky.

Additionally, Nantucket's importance as a whaling port meant that wives of sailors were left for months, sometimes years, to manage affairs at home while their husbands were at sea, thus fostering an atmosphere of relative independence and equality for the women of the island.

After attending Elizabeth Gardner small school as a young child, Mitchell enrolled in the North Grammar school, where her father was the first principal. When Maria Mitchell was 11 years old, her father founded his own school on Howard Street. There, she was a student and also a teaching assistant to her father. In 1831, at the age of 12, Mitchell aided her father in calculating the exact moment of a solar eclipse.

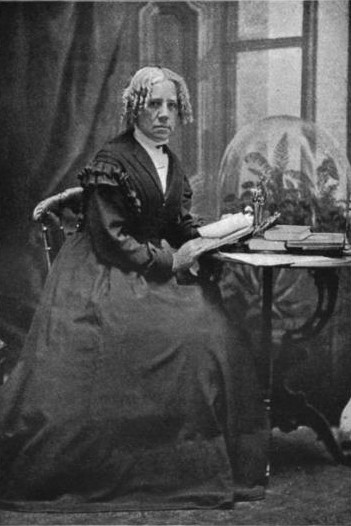
Photograph of Maria Mitchell by Julia Ward Howe,

William Mitchell's school closed, and afterwards she attended Unitarian minister Cyrus Peirce's school for young ladies until she was about the age of 16. Later, she worked for Peirce as his teaching assistant before opening her own school in 1835. Mitchell developed experimental teaching methods, which she later employed during her professorship at Vassar College. She allowed nonwhite children to attend her school, though the local public school was still racially segregated.

In 1836, Mitchell began working as the first librarian of the Nantucket Atheneum, a position she held for 20 years. The institution's limited operating hours enabled Mitchell to assist her father with a series of astronomical observations and geographical calculations for the United States Coast Survey and to continue her own education. Mitchell and her father worked in a small observatory constructed on the roof of the Pacific Bank building with a four-inch equatorial telescope provided by the survey. In addition to looking for nebulae and double stars, the pair produced latitudes and longitudes by calculating the altitudes of stars and the culminations and occultations of the Moon, respectively.

In 1843, Mitchell converted to Unitarianism, although she did not physically attend a Unitarian Church until more than twenty years later. Her departure from the Quaker faith did not cause a break with her family, with whom she appears to have remained close. Historians have limited knowledge about this period in Mitchell's life because few of her personal documents remain from before 1846. Members of the Mitchell family believed she destroyed many of her personal documents in order to keep them private, having witnessed personal papers blown through the street by the Great Fire of 1846, and because fear of another fire persisted.

== Discovery of "Miss Mitchell's Comet" (1847–1849) ==
At 10:50 pm on the night of October 1, 1847, Mitchell discovered Comet 1847 VI (modern designation C/1847 T1) using a Dollond refracting telescope with three inches of aperture and forty-six-inch focal length. She had noticed an unknown object in an area where she previously had not noticed any other activity and believed it to be a comet. The comet later became known as "Miss Mitchell's Comet." She published a notice of her discovery in Silliman's Journal in January 1848 under her father's name. The following month, she submitted her calculation of the comet's orbit, ensuring her claim as the original discoverer. Mitchell was celebrated at the Seneca Falls Convention for the discovery and calculation later that year.

On October 6, 1848, Mitchell was awarded a gold medal prize for her discovery by King Christian VIII of Denmark. This award had been previously established by King Frederick VI of Denmark to honor the "first discoverer" of each new telescopic comet, a comet too faint to be seen with the naked eye. A question of credit temporarily arose because Francesco de Vico had independently discovered the same comet two days after Mitchell but reported it to European authorities first. Mitchell was declared the first to discover the comet and she was awarded the prize. The only previous women to discover a comet were the astronomers Caroline Herschel and Maria Margarethe Kirch.

Mitchell's medal was inscribed with line 257 of Book I of Virgil's Georgics: "Non Frustra Signorum Obitus Speculamur et Ortus" (Not in vain do we watch the setting and the rising [of the stars]). Though the award was sent via letter in 1848, Mitchell did not physically receive the award in Nantucket until March 1849. She became the first American to receive this medal and the first woman to receive an award in astronomy.

== Intermediate years (1849–1864) ==
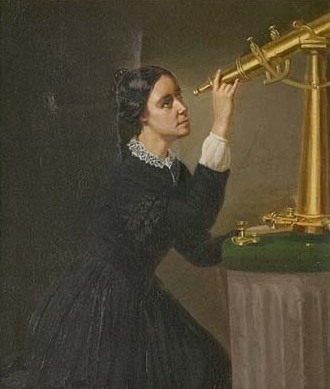
Portrait of Maria Mitchell by Herminia Borchard Dassel, ca. 1851

Mitchell became a celebrity following her discovery of the comet, with hundreds of newspaper articles written about her in the subsequent decade. At her home on Nantucket, she entertained a number of prominent academics such as Ralph Waldo Emerson, Herman Melville, Frederick Douglass, and Sojourner Truth. In 1849, Mitchell accepted a computing and field research position for the U.S. Coast Survey undertaken at the U.S. Nautical Almanac Office. Her work consisted of tracking the movements of the planets — particularly Venus — and compiling tables of their positions to assist sailors in navigation. She joined the American Association for the Advancement of Science in 1850 and befriended many of its members, including the director of the Smithsonian Institution, Joseph Henry.

Mitchell traveled to Europe in 1857. While abroad, Mitchell toured the observatories of contemporary European astronomers Sir John and Caroline Herschel and Mary Somerville. She also spoke with a number of natural philosophers including Alexander von Humboldt, William Whewell, and Adam Sedgewick before continuing her travels with Nathaniel Hawthorne and his family. Mitchell never married, but remained close to her immediate family throughout her life, even living in Lynn, Massachusetts with her sister Kate and her family in 1888.

== Professorship at Vassar College (1865–1888) ==
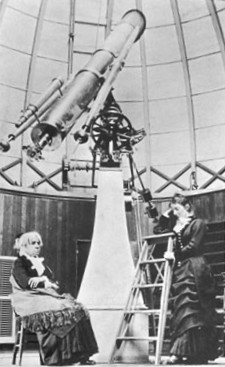
Maria Mitchell (seated) inside the dome of the Vassar College Observatory, with her student Mary Watson Whitney (standing), circa 1877

Though Mitchell did not have a college education, she was appointed professor of astronomy at Vassar College by its founder, Matthew Vassar, in 1865, and became the first female professor of astronomy. Mitchell was the first person appointed to the faculty and was also named director of the Vassar College Observatory, a position she held for more than two decades. Mitchell also edited the astronomical column of Scientific American during her professorship. Thanks in part to Mitchell's guidance, Vassar College enrolled more students in mathematics and astronomy than Harvard University from 1865 to 1888. In 1869, Mitchell became one of the first women elected to the American Philosophical Society, alongside Mary Somerville and Elizabeth Cabot Agassiz. She received honorary doctorates from Hanover College, Columbia University, and Rutgers Female College.

Mitchell employed many unconventional teaching methods in her classes. She reported neither grades nor absences, advocated for small classes and individualized attention, and incorporated technology and mathematics into her lessons. Though her students' career options were limited by their gender, she emphasized the importance of their study of astronomy. "I cannot expect to make astronomers," she said to her students, "but I do expect that you will invigorate your minds by the effort at healthy modes of thinking. When we are chafed and fretted by small cares, a look at the stars will show us the littleness of our own interests."

Mitchell's research interests were varied. She photographed planets such as Jupiter and Saturn, as well as their moons, and studied nebulae, double stars, and solar eclipses. Mitchell also developed theories around her observations, such as the revolution of one star around another in double star formations and the influence of distance and chemical composition in star color variation.

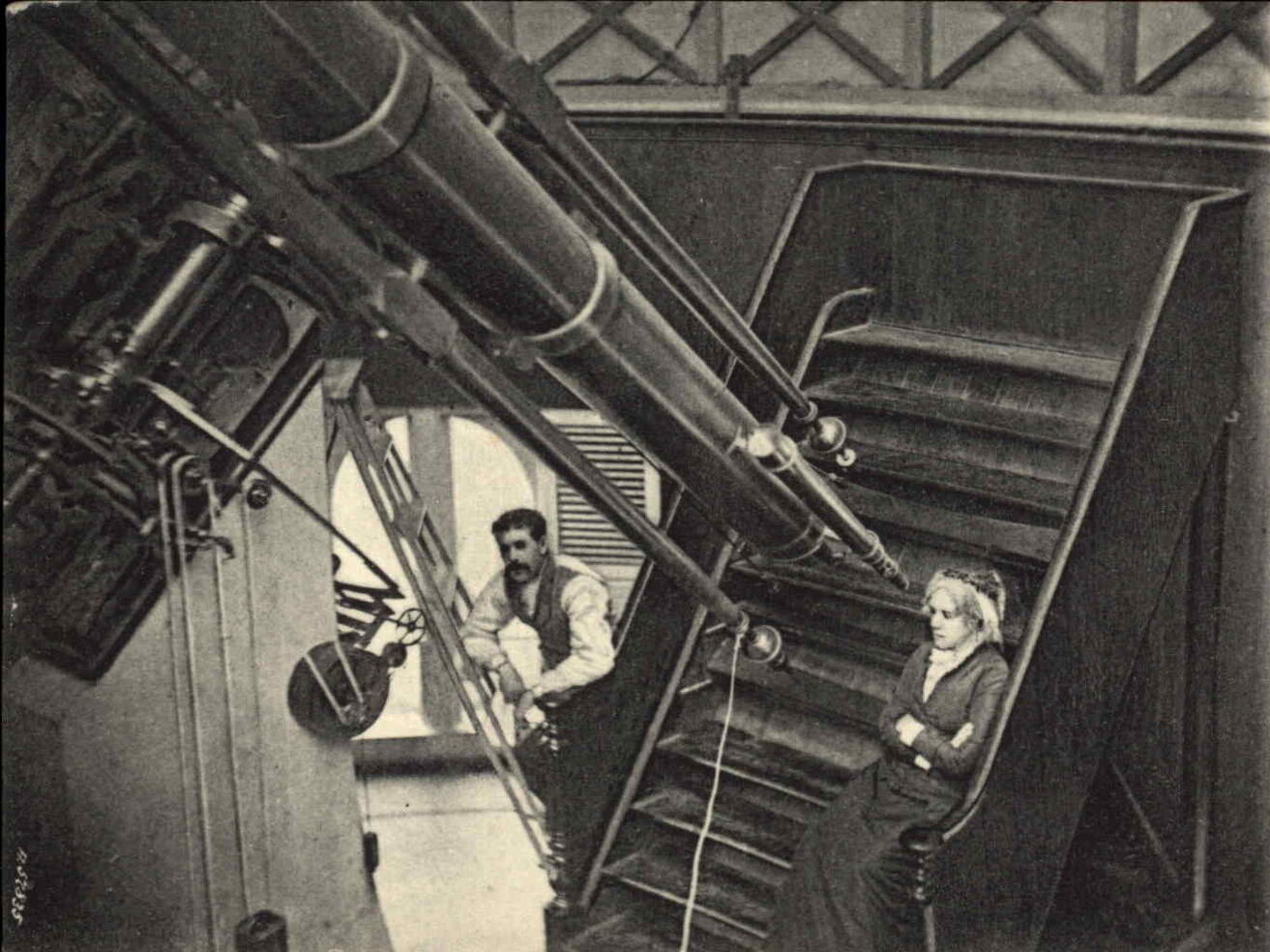
Maria Mitchell inside the Vassar College Observatory, 1878

Mitchell often involved her students with her astronomical observations in both the field and the Vassar College Observatory. Though she began recording sunspots by eye in 1868, she and her students began photographing them daily in 1873. These were the first regular photographs of the Sun, and they allowed her to explore the hypothesis that sunspots were cavities rather than clouds on the surface of the Sun. For the total solar eclipse of July 29, 1878 Mitchell and five assistants traveled with a 4-inch telescope to Denver for observations. Her efforts contributed to the success of Vassar's science and astronomy graduates, as twenty-five of her students would go on to be featured in Who's Who in America.

After teaching at Vassar for some time, Mitchell discovered that she was being paid less than many younger male professors. Mitchell and Alida Avery, the only other woman on the faculty at that time, demanded a salary increase, which they received. She taught at the college until her retirement in 1888, one year before her death.

== Social activism ==
In 1841, Mitchell attended the anti-slavery convention in Nantucket where Frederick Douglass made his first speech, and she also became involved in the anti-slavery movement by boycotting clothes made of Southern cotton. She later became involved in a number of social issues as a professor, particularly those pertaining to women's suffrage and education. She also befriended various suffragists including Elizabeth Cady Stanton. After returning from a trip to Europe in 1873, Mitchell joined the national women's movement and helped found the Association for the Advancement of Women (AAW), a group dedicated to educational reform and the promotion of women in higher education. Mitchell addressed the Association's First Women's Congress in a speech titled The Higher Education of Women in which she described the work of English women working for access to higher education at Girton College, Cambridge.

Mitchell advocated for women working part-time while studying to make them more independent, as well as to increase their skills. She also called attention to the place for women in science and mathematics and encouraged others to support women's colleges and women's campaigns to serve on local school boards. Mitchell served as the second president of the AAW in 1875 and 1876 before stepping down to head a special Committee on Science to analyze and promote women's progress in the field. She held this position until her death in 1889.

== Death and legacy ==
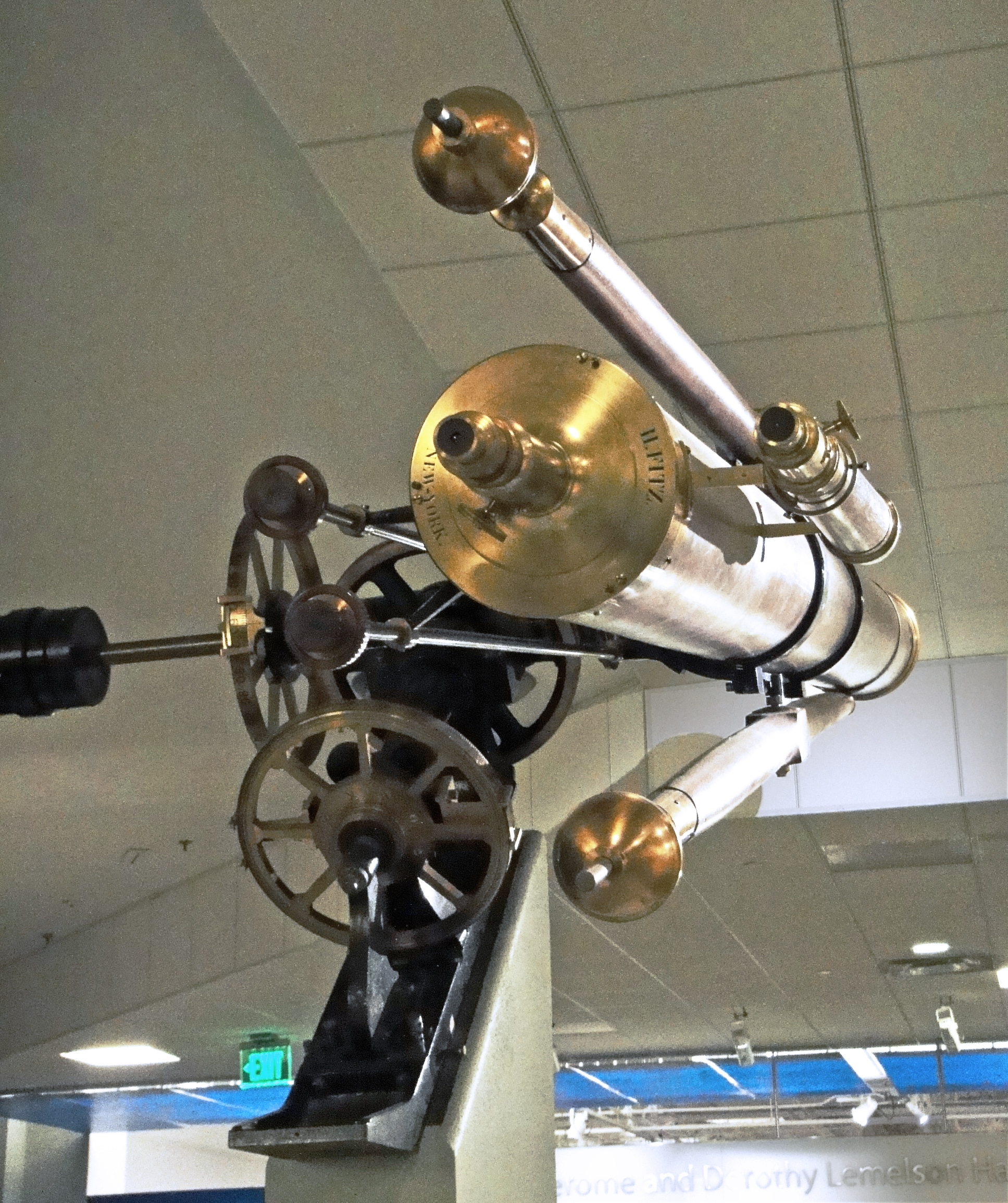
Maria Mitchell's telescope, on display in the Smithsonian Institution National Museum of American History

Mitchell died of brain disease on June 28, 1889, in Lynn, Massachusetts at the age of 70. She was buried in Lot 411, in Prospect Hill Cemetery, Nantucket. The Maria Mitchell Association was established to promote the sciences on Nantucket and preserve the legacy of Mitchell's work. The Association operates a Natural History museum, an Aquarium, a Science Library and Research Center, Maria Mitchell's Home Museum, and an Observatory named in her honor, the Maria Mitchell Observatory.

In 1989, Mitchell was named a National Women's History Month Honoree by the National Women's History Project and was inducted into the National Women's Hall of Fame in 1994. She was the namesake of a World War II Liberty ship, the SS Maria Mitchell, and New York's Metro North commuter railroad (with its Hudson Line endpoint in Poughkeepsie near Vassar College) has a train named the Maria Mitchell Comet. A crater on the Moon was also named in her honor. On August 1, 2013, the search engine Google honored Maria Mitchell with a Google Doodle showing her in cartoon form on top of a roof gazing through a telescope in search of comets.

Her unique place at the intersection of American science and culture has been captured in a number of recent publications.

== Publications ==
During her life, Mitchell published seven items in the Royal Society Catalog and three articles detailing her observations in Silliman's Journal. Mitchell also authored three articles for Hours at Home, Century, and The Atlantic.

== See also ==
- List of astronomers
- List of Christian thinkers in science
- List of female scientists before the 21st century
- Timeline of women in science
