= List of women astronomers =

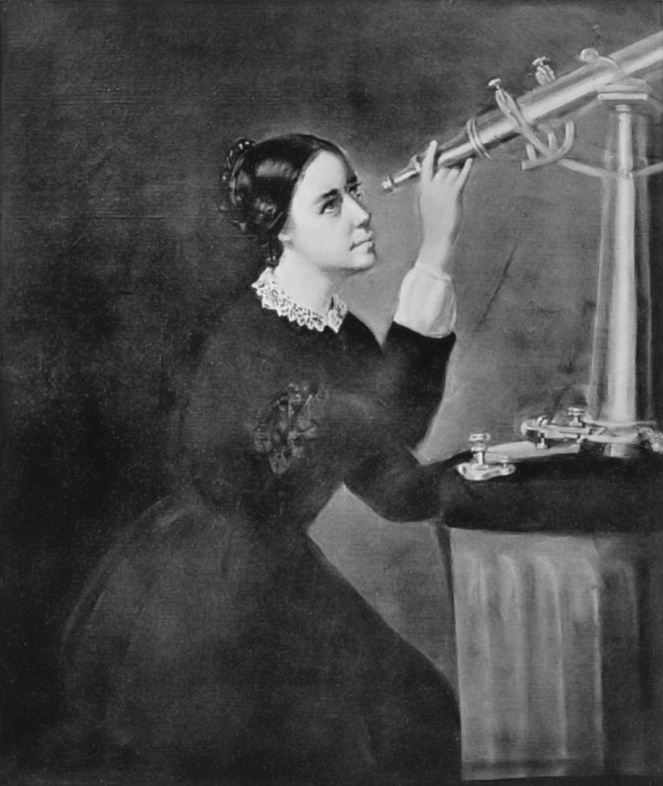
Maria Mitchell (1818–1889) Professor of astronomy at Vassar College

The following is a list of astronomers, astrophysicists and other notable women who have made contributions to the field of astronomy.

== A ==
- Madge Adam (1912–2001), English solar astronomer
- Maggie Aderin-Pocock (born 1968), English space scientist
- Conny Aerts (born 1966), Belgian astrophysicist specializing in asteroseismology
- Aglaonike (c. 1st or 2nd Century BCE), ancient Greek astronomer and thaumaturge
- María Luisa Aguilar Hurtado (1938–2015), Peruvian astronomer
- Eva Ahnert-Rohlfs (1912–1954), German variable star astronomer
- Elizabeth Alexander (1908–1958), English geologist and physicist
- Leah B. Allen (1884–1973), American astronomer and educator
- Adelaide Ames (1900–1932), American astronomer
- Anja Cetti Andersen (born 1965), Danish astronomer focused on cosmic dust
- Necia H. Apfel (born 1930), American astronomer and educator
- Alice Archenhold (1874–1943), German astronomer
- Anne Archibald, Canadian astronomer and educator
- Felicitas Arias, (born 1952), Argentine astronomer and expert on geodesy
- Gabriella Conti Armellini (1891-1974), Italian astronomer

== B ==
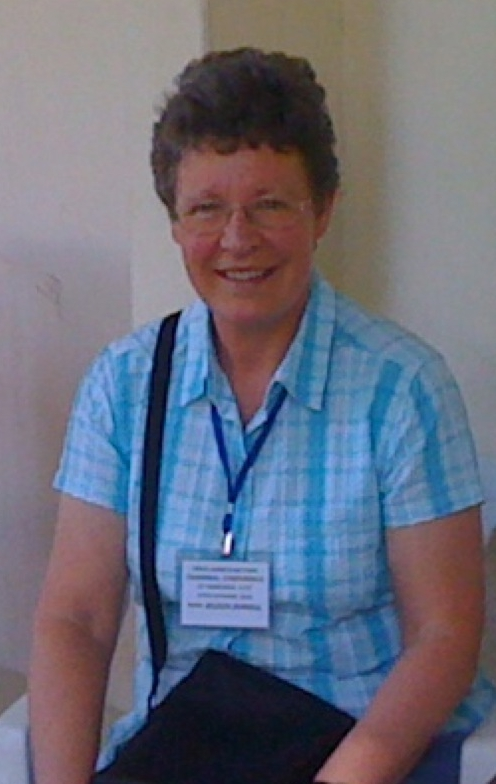
Jocelyn Bell Burnell

- Neta Bahcall (born 1942), Israeli astrophysicist and cosmologist specializing in dark matter
- Odette Bancilhon (1908–1998), French astronomer
- Kirsten Banks Wiradjuri astronomer researching red giant stars
- Beatriz Barbuy (born 1950), Brazilian astrophysicist
- Amy Barger (born 1971), American galactic astronomer
- Nadine G. Barlow (1958–2020), American planetary scientist
- Amy Barr, American planetary geophysicist
- Maria A. Barucci, Italian astronomer
- Sarbani Basu, Indian-American astronomer working in solar and stellar astrophysics
- Natalie Batalha (born 1966), American astronomer
- Stefi Baum (born 1958), American astronomer and educator
- Bohumila Bednářová (1904–1985), Czech astronomer
- Reta Beebe (born 1936), American planetary scientist
- Sabine Bellstedt, Australian astronomer studying galaxy evolution
- Emilia Pisani Belserene (1922–2012), American astronomer
- Misty C. Bentz (born 1980), American astronomer
- Beverly Berger, American physicist working on gravitational physics, especially gravitational waves, gravitons, and gravitational singularities
- Alessandra Buonanno (born 1968), Italian-American theoretical physicist working in the field of gravitational wave astronomy and general relativity
- Jocelyn Bell Burnell (born 1943), Irish radio astronomer
- Mary Adela Blagg (1858–1944), English selenologist
- Erika Böhm-Vitense (1923–2017), German-born American stellar astronomer
- Priscilla Fairfield Bok (1896–1975), American astronomer of galactic astronomy
- Tabetha S. Boyajian (born c. 1980), American stellar and exoplanetary astronomer
- Sophia Brahe (c. 1559 to 1643), Danish noble woman
- Ingeborg Brun (1872–1929), Danish amateur astronomer
- Margaret Burbidge (1919–2020), British-American observational astronomer and astrophysicist
- Marta Burgay (born 1976), Italian radio astronomer
- Mary E. Byrd (1849–1934), American educator and cometary observer

== C ==
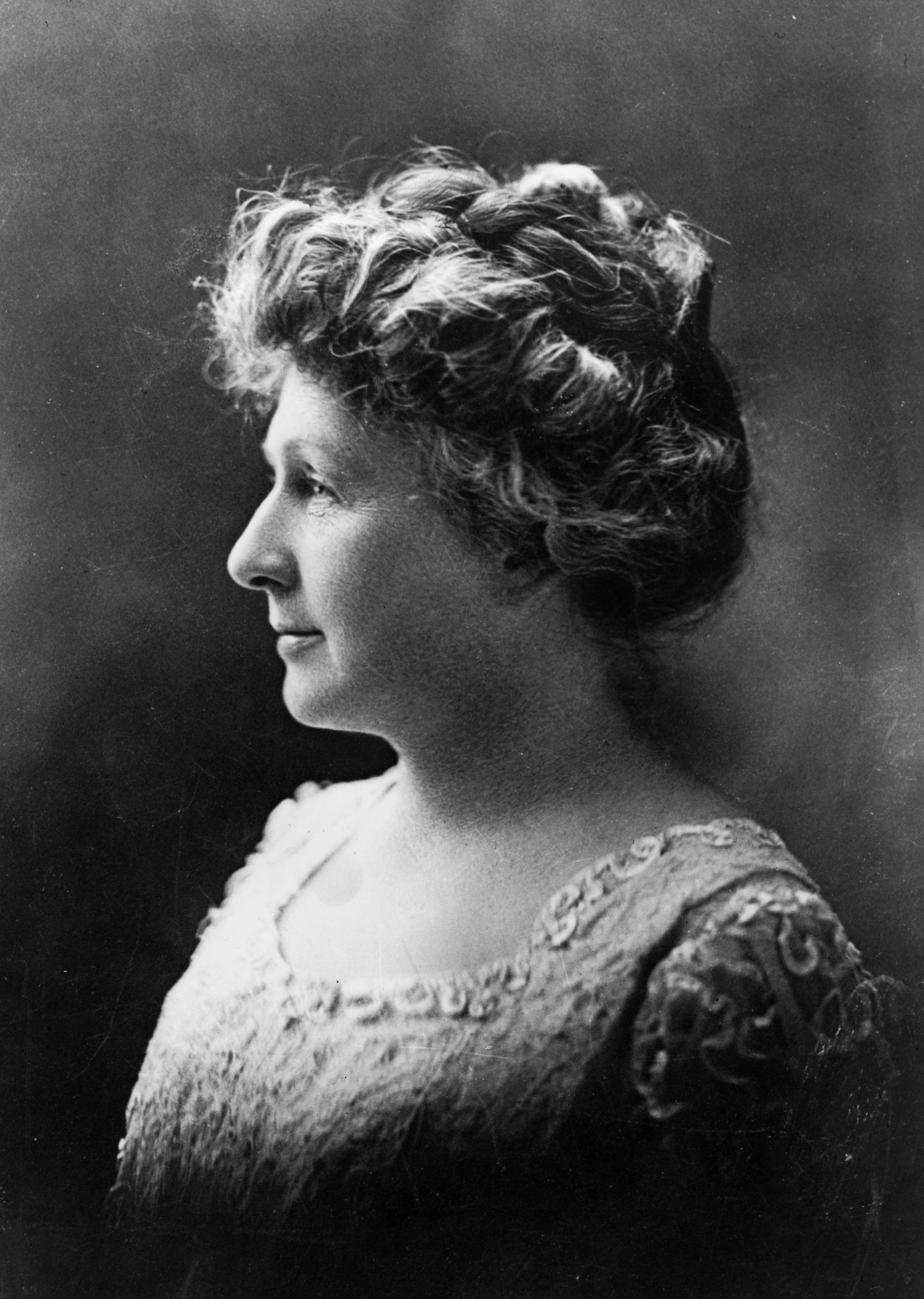
Annie Jump Cannon 1922 Portrait

- Annie Jump Cannon (1863−1941), American astronomer who cataloged stellar spectra
- Robin M. Canup (born 1968), American planetary scientist
- Nicole Capitaine (born 1948), French astronomer specializing in astrometry
- C. Marcella Carollo, Italian astronomer studying galaxy formation and evolution
- Catherine Cesarsky (born 1943), Argentinian–French astrophysicist
- Merieme Chadid (born 1969), Moroccan-French astronomer
- Kyongae Chang (born 1946), South Korean astrophysicist and instructor
- Princess Charlotte of Saxe-Meiningen (1751–1827), German noble and patron of astronomy
- Jun Chen, Chinese–American astronomer
- Lyudmila Chernykh (1935–2017), Russian astronomer
- Jessie Christiansen, Australian astrophysicist
- Agnes Mary Clerke (1842–1907), Irish astronomer and author
- Judith Gamora Cohen (born 1946), American astronomer researching galactic astronomy
- Françoise Combes (born 1952), French astrophysicist and educator
- Lynn Cominsky (born 1953), American astrophysicist and educator
- Janine Connes (1926–2024), French astronomer
- France A. Córdova (born 1947), American astrophysicist and administrator
- Heather Couper (1949–2020), English astronomer, broadcaster and science populariser
- Athena Coustenis, Greek planetary scientist
- Carolin Crawford, English astrophysicist and educator
- Lucy D’Escoffier Crespo da Silva (1978–2000), Brazilian astronomy student
- Maria Cunitz (1610–1664), Silesian astronomer and author

== D ==
- Rosina Dafter (1875–1959), Australian astronomer
- Ruth Agnes Daly (born 1958), American astrophysicist
- Laura Danly (born 1958), American astronomer and educator
- Doris Daou (born 1964), Lebanese-Canada astronomer and educator
- Tamara Davis, Australian astrophysicist studying cosmology and specialising in the dark energy
- Suzanne Débarbat (1928–2024), French astronomer and historian of science and technology
- Marie-Jeanne de Lalande (1768–1832), French astronomer and mathematician
- Audrey C. Delsanti (born 1976), French astrobiologist
- Krystal De Napoli, Kamilaroi astrophysicist
- Elsa van Dien (1914–2007), Dutch astronomer
- Harriet Dinerstein, American astronomer
- Ewine van Dishoeck (born 1955), Dutch astrochemist
- Anlaug Amanda Djupvik, Norwegian stellar astronomer
- Megan Donahue, American astronomer and instructor
- Vibert Douglas (1894–1988), Canadian astrophysicist
- Laura Driessen, Australian radio astronomer and science communicator
- Jeanne Dumée (1660–1706), French astronomer and author
- Jo Dunkley (1979/1980), British cosmologist
- Andrea Dupree, American astrophysicist

== E ==
- Maria Clara Eimmart (1676–1707), German astronomer, engraver, and designer
- Sara Ellison, Canadian astronomer and instructor studying extragalactic astronomy
- Rebecca Elson (1960–1999), Canadian–American astronomer and writer

== F ==
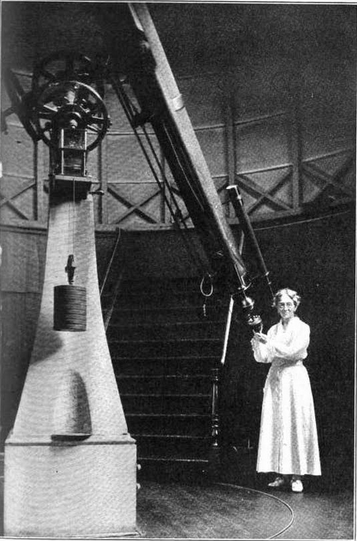
Caroline Furness (1918)

- Sandra Faber (born 1944), American astrophysicist and instructor studying galactic evolution
- Annette Ferguson, Scottish observational astrophysicist
- Laura Ferrarese, Italian astronomer studying supermassive black holes
- Debra Fischer, American astronomer investigating exoplanets
- Gabrielle Renaudot Flammarion (1877–1962), French astronomer
- Williamina Fleming (1857–1911), Scottish astronomer
- Anna Frebel (born 1980), German astronomer
- Wendy Freedman (born 1957), Canadian-American observational cosmologist
- Katherine Freese (born 1957), German theoretical astrophysicist
- Caroline Furness (1869–1936), American astronomer and teacher

== G ==
- Catharine Garmany (born 1946), American astronomer and educator
- Pamela L. Gay (born 1973), American astronomer, educator, and writer
- Vera Fedorovna Gaze (1899–1954), Russian astronomer who studied emission nebula and minor planets
- Margaret Geller (born 1947), American astrophysicist studying extragalactic astronomy
- Andrea M. Ghez (born 1965), American astronomer, teacher, and Nobel prize winner
- Agnes Giberne (1845–1939), English novelist and scientific writer
- Nüzhet Gökdoğan (1910–2003), Turkish astronomer, mathematician and academic
- Merle Gold (1921–2017), American astrophysicist
- Andreja Gomboc (born 1969), Slovenian astrophysicist
- Gabriela González (born 1965), Argentine professor of physics and astronomy
- Alyssa A. Goodman (born 1962), American astrophysicist
- Eva Grebel, German astronomer studying stellar populations and galaxy formation
- Lucie Green (born c. 1975), English science communicator and solar researcher
- Jenny Greene (born 1978), American astrophysicist and teacher studying supermassive black holes and galaxies
- Ruth Grützbauch (born 1978), Austrian astronomer

== H ==
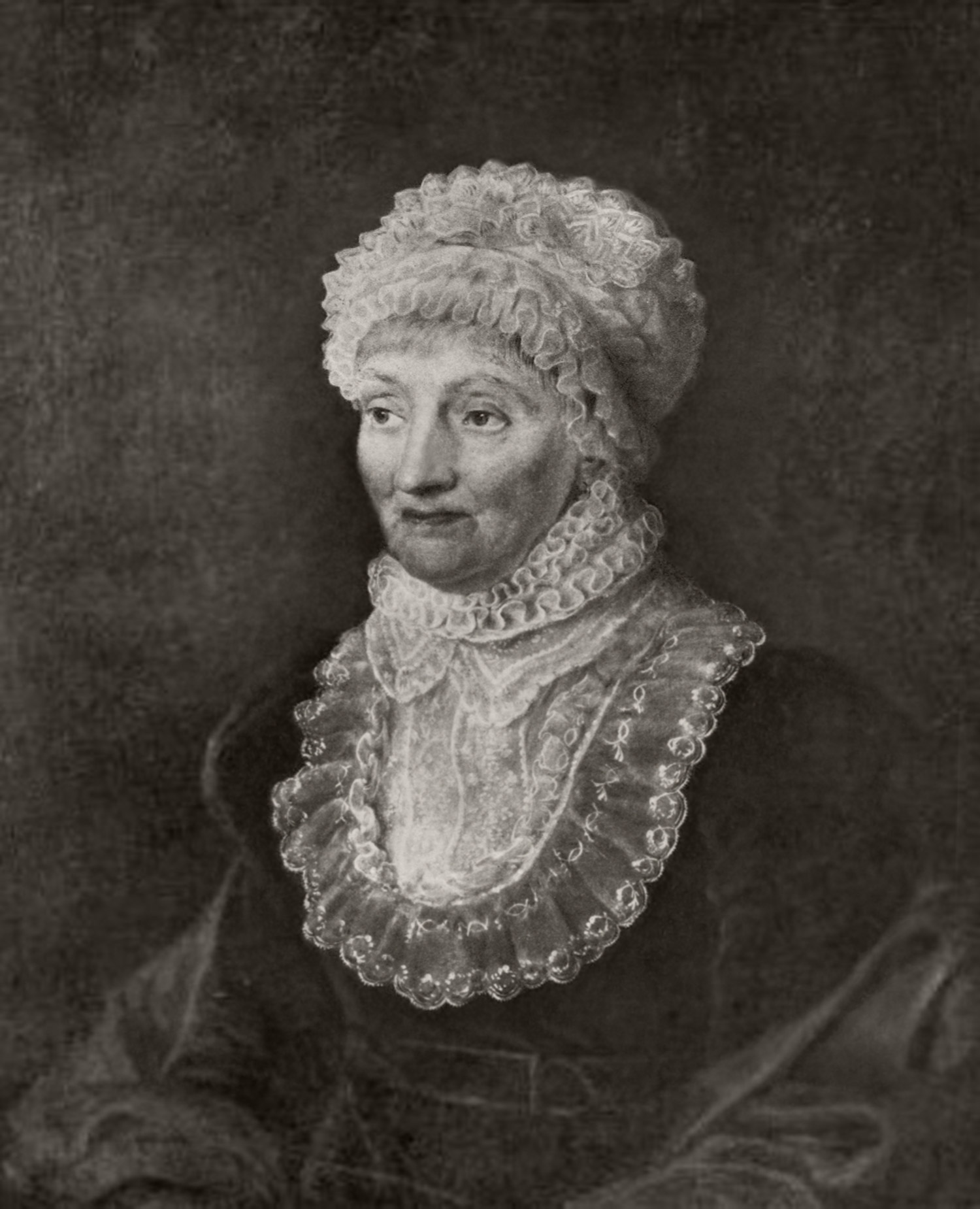
Caroline Herschel (1750–1848)

- Margherita Hack (1922–2013), Italian astrophysicist and first female director of Trieste's Observatory
- Erika Hamden, American astrophysicist and instructor
- Heidi Hammel (born 1960), American planetary scientist
- Fiona A. Harrison, American astrophysicist
- Marjorie Hall Harrison (1918–1986), English-born American astronomer
- Lisa Harvey-Smith (born 1979), British-Australian astrophysicist
- Margaret Harwood (1885–1979), American astronomer
- Martha P. Haynes (born 1951), American astronomer specialized in radio astronomy and extragalactic astronomy
- Martha Locke Hazen (1931–2006), American astronomer
- E. Ruth Hedeman (1910–2006), American solar astronomer
- Mary Lea Heger (1897–1983), American astronomer who studied the interstellar medium
- Charlene Heisler (1961–1999), Canadian astronomer
- Eleanor F. Helin (1932–2009), American astronomer who studied near–Earth asteroids
- Amina Helmi (born 1970), Argentine astronomer
- Amanda Hendrix (born 1968), American planetary scientist
- Caroline Herschel (1750–1848), German astronomer
- Elisabeth Hevelius (1647–1693), Polish astronomer
- Jacqueline Hewitt (born 1958), American astrophysicist
- Catherine Heymans (born 1978), British astrophysicist and instructor
- Renée Hložek (born 1983), South African cosmologist
- Dorrit Hoffleit (1907–2007), American astronomer
- Helen Sawyer Hogg (1905–1993), American-Canadian astronomer
- Ann Hornschemeier, American astronomer studying X-ray astronomy
- Joan Horvath, American aeronautical engineer and writer
- Nancy Houk, American astronomer
- Ingrid van Houten-Groeneveld (1921–2015), Dutch astronomer studying minor planets
- Margaret Lindsay Huggins (1848–1915), Irish-English scientific investigator and astronomer
- Roberta M. Humphreys (born 1944), American astronomer, known for observations that led to the Humphreys-Davidson Limit.
- Carolyn Hurless (1934–1987), American astronomer and an American Association of Variable Star Observers merit award winner.
- Natasha Hurley-Walker, Australian radio astronomer who discovered long-period radio transients
- Hypatia (c. 350–370 to 415), Hellenistic Neoplatonist philosopher, astronomer, and mathematician

== I ==
- Violeta G. Ivanova, Bulgarian astronomer
- Al-ʻIjliyyah (c. 10th-century), Arab maker of astrolabes

== J ==
- Odette Jasse (1899–1949), French astronomer at Marseille Observatory
- Louise Freeland Jenkins (1888–1970), American astronomer of stellar astronomy
- Carole Jordan (born 1941), English physicist, astrophysicist, astronomer and academic

== K ==
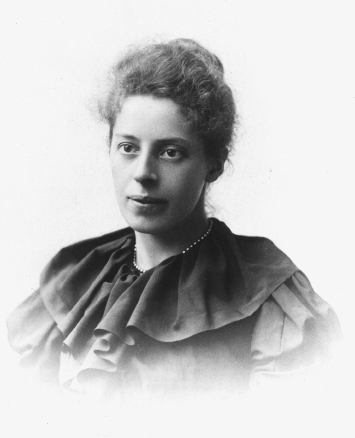
Dorothea Klumpke (1861–1942)

- Vicky Kalogera, Greek astrophysicist
- Devika Kamath, Australian astrophysicist
- Lyudmila Karachkina (born 1948), Russian astronomer studying astrometry and minor planets
- Victoria Kaspi (born 1967), American-Canadian astrophysicist and instructor
- Lisa Kewley (born 1974), Australian astronomer studying galactic evolution
- Pamela M. Kilmartin, New Zealand astronomer searching for comets and minor planets
- Maria Margarethe Kirch (1670–1720), German astronomer and calendar maker
- Margaret G. Kivelson (born 1928), American planetary scientist
- Dorothea Klumpke (1861–1942), American astronomer
- Gillian R. Knapp, American astronomer
- Kirsten Kraiberg Knudsen, Danish astronomer studying galaxies
- Heather A. Knutson, American astronomer studying exoplanets
- Gloria Koenigsberger, Mexican astrophysicist and instructor
- Bärbel Koribalski, German astrophysicist studying galaxy formation and evolution
- Lenka Kotková (born 1973), Czech astronomer
- Chryssa Kouveliotou (born 1953), Greek astrophysicist and instructor
- Reiki Kushida, Japanese amateur astronomer

== L ==
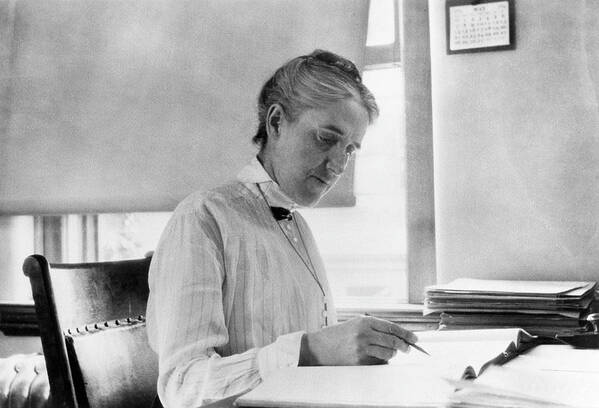
Henrietta Swan Leavitt (1868–1921)

- Elizabeth Lada, American astronomer and instructor
- Eleanor Annie Lamson (1875–1932), American astronomer
- Marguerite Laugier (1896–1976), French astronomer who discovered minor planets
- Gemma Lavender (born 1986), British astronomer, author and journalist
- Henrietta Swan Leavitt (1868–1921), American astronomer who observed variable stars
- Nicole-Reine Lepaute (1723–1788), French astronomer and mathematician
- Isabel Martin Lewis (1881–1966), American astronomer and author
- Nikole Lewis, American astrophysicist
- Helen Lines (1918–2001), American amateur astronomer
- Sarah Lee Lippincott (1920–2019), American astronomer and instructor who focused on astrometry
- Jane Luu (born 1963), Vietnamese–American astronomer and defense systems engineer

== M ==
- Amy Mainzer (born 1974), American astronomer specializing in astrophysical instrumentation and infrared astronomy
- Esmeralda Mallada (1937–2023), Uruguayan astronomer and instructor
- Rachel Mandelbaum, American astronomer
- Mileva Marić (1875–1948), Serbian physicist and mathematician studying astronomy among other topics
- Karen Masters (born 1979), American astrophysicist studying galaxy formation and evolution
- Janet Akyüz Mattei (1943–2004), Turkish-American astronomer studying variable stars
- Annie Russell Maunder (1868–1947), Irish-British astronomer
- Antonia Maury (1866–1952), American astronomer studying stellar astronomy
- Claire Ellen Max (born 1946), American astronomer and instructor
- Margaret Mayall (1902–1995), American astronomer studying variable stars
- Jess McIver, American astronomer
- Jaylee Burley Mead (1929–2012), American astronomer
- Karen Jean Meech (born 1959), American planetary scientist
- Chiara Mingarelli, Italian-Canadian astrophysicist, researching gravitational waves
- Maria Mitchell (1818–1889), American astronomer, librarian, naturalist, and educator
- Linda A. Morabito (born 1953), American planetary scientist
- Vanessa Moss, Australian radio astronomer, researching galaxy evolution
- Jean Mueller (born 1950), American astronomer
- Carole Mundell, British observational astrophysicist, researching cosmic black holes and gamma ray bursts
- Tara Murphy, Australian astrophysicist
- Burçin Mutlu-Pakdil, Turkish astrophysicist

== N ==
- Sultana N. Nahar, Bangladeshi-American physicist studying atomic processes in astrophysical and laboratory plasmas
- Joan Najita, American astronomer researching the formation and evolution of stars and planetary systems
- Yaël Nazé, Belgian astrophysicist studying massive stars and their environmental interaction
- Heidi Jo Newberg, American astrophysicist studying the Milky Way structure
- Karlie Noon, Gamilaroi astrophysicist

== O ==
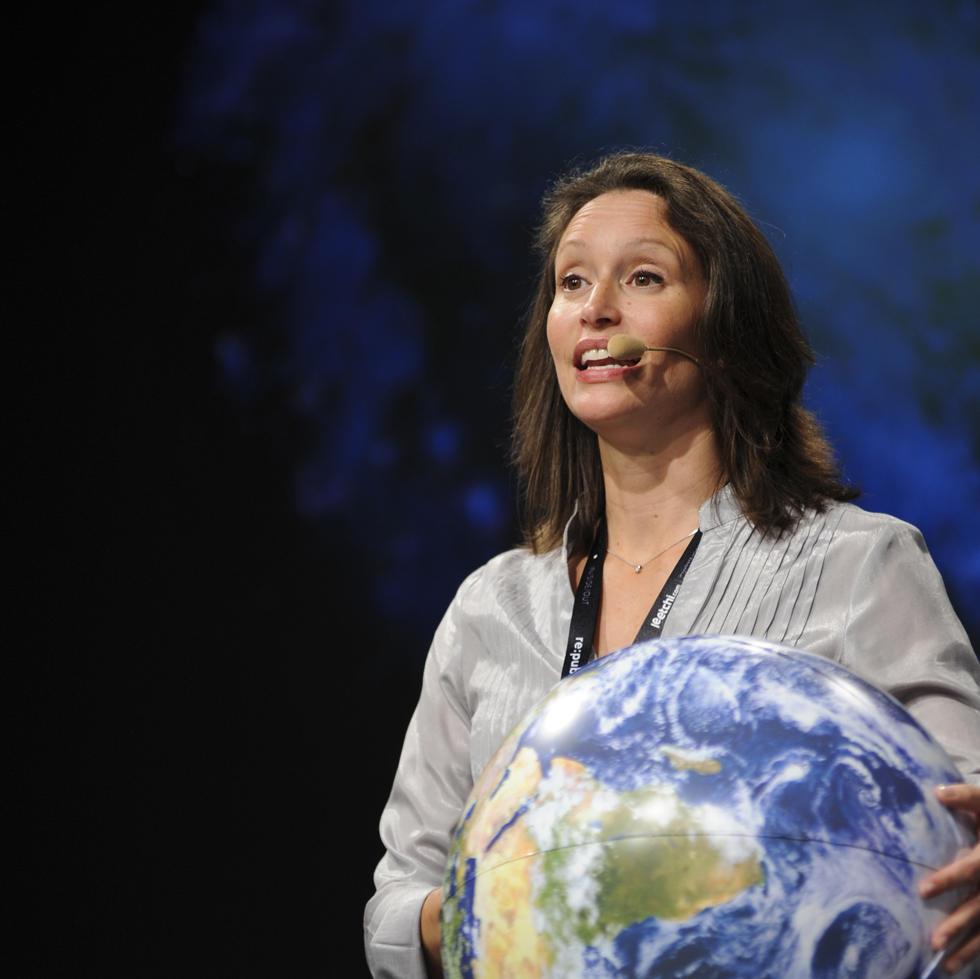
Carolina Ödman-Govender in 2013.

- Carolina Ödman-Govender, (1974–2022), Swiss astrophysicist and lecturer
- Sally Oey, American astronomer researching massive stars
- Kathleen Ollerenshaw, (1912–2014), English mathematician, politician, and amateur astronomer
- C. Michelle Olmstead (born 1969), American astronomer and computer scientist who has discovered minor planets
- Liisi Oterma (1915–2001), Finnish astronomer
- Mazlan Othman (born 1951), Malaysian astrophysicist
- Feryal Özel (born 1975), Turkish astrophysicist studying stellar remnants

== P ==
- M. Alessandra Papa (born 1967), Italian physicist specializing in the observation of gravitational waves
- Cecilia Payne-Gaposchkin (1900–1979), British-born American astrophysicist and instructor
- Ruby Payne-Scott (1912–1981), Australian radio astronomer
- Louise du Pierry (1746–1807), French astronomer and instructor
- Carle Pieters (born 1943), American planetary scientist
- Thushara Pillai, (born 1980), Indian astrophysicist and astronomer
- Paris Pişmiş (1911–1999), Armenian-Mexican astronomer
- Elena V. Pitjeva, Russian astronomer studying solar system dynamics and celestial mechanics
- Carolyn Porco (born 1953), American planetary scientist
- Helen Dodson Prince (1905–2002), American astronomer and instructor
- Mary Proctor (1862–1957), American popularizer of astronomy

== Q ==
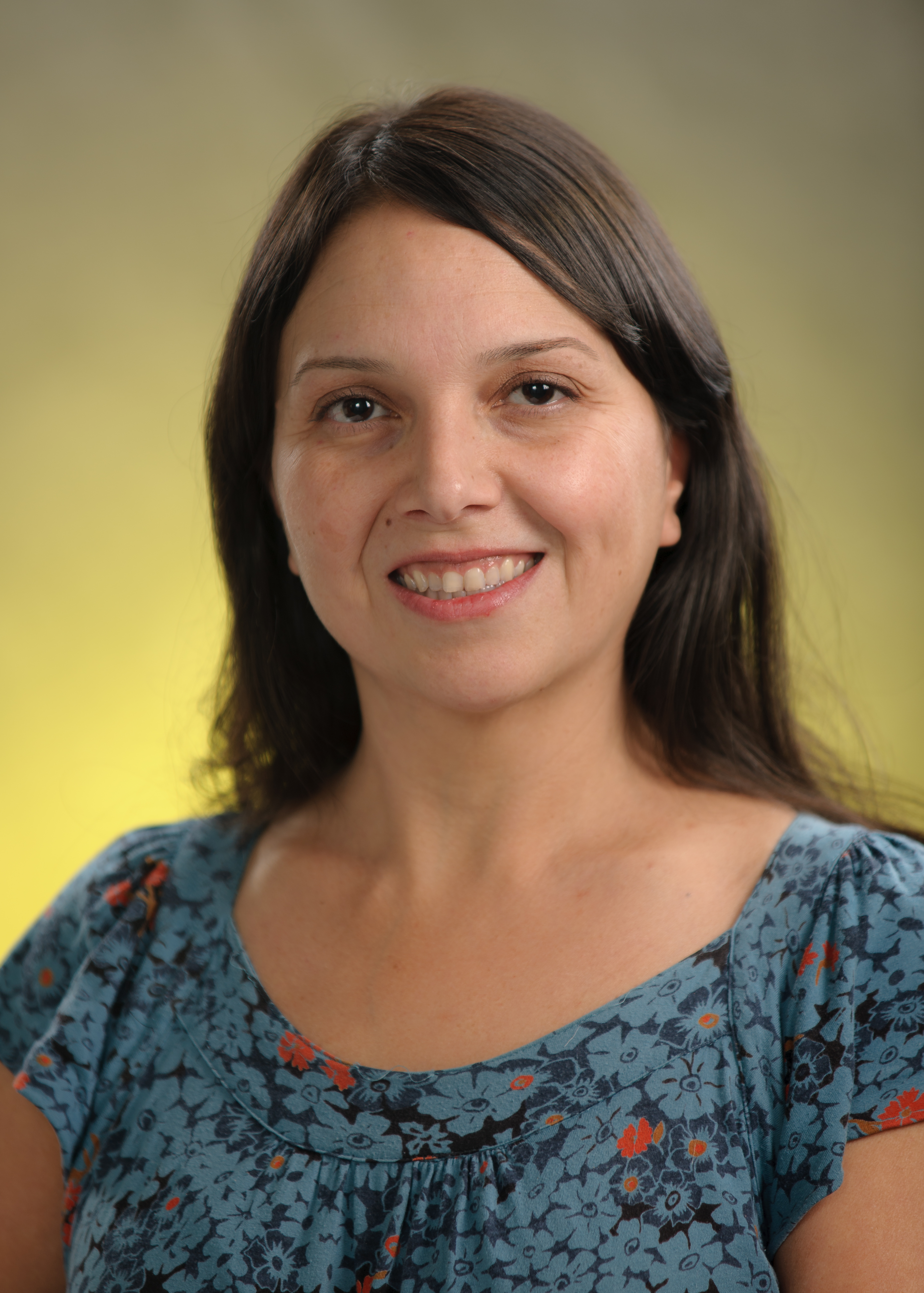
Elisa Quintana in 2014

- Elisa Quintana, American planetary scientist

== R ==
- Hilkka Rantaseppä-Helenius (1925–1975), Finnish astronomer who studied minor planets
- Luisa Rebull, American stellar astronomer
- Katharine Reeves, American solar astronomer
- Emily Rice, American astronomer researching sub-stellar objects including brown dwarfs
- Christina Richey, American planetary scientist and astrophysicist
- Marcia Rieke, American infrared astronomer and JWST NIRCam PI
- Julia Riley (born 1947), English radio astronomer
- Constance M. Rockosi, American galactic astronomer
- Elizabeth Roemer (1929–2016), American astronomer who studied minor planets
- Nancy Roman (1925–2018), American stellar astronomer
- Kat Ross, Australian astrophysicist studying black holes
- Marta Graciela Rovira, Argentinian astrophysicist
- Vera Rubin (1928–2016), American astronomer researching extragalactic astronomy
- María Teresa Ruiz (born 1946), Chilean astronomer

== S ==
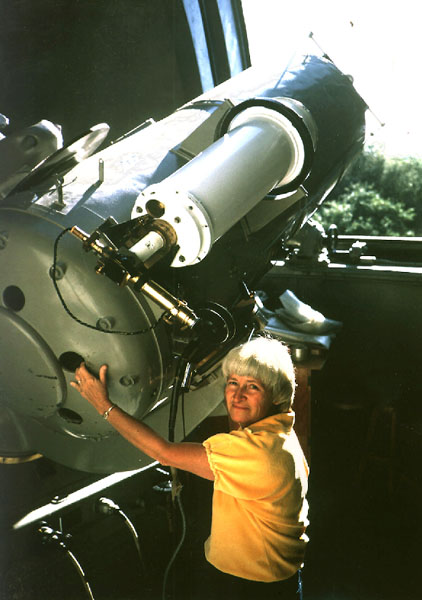
Carolyn S. Shoemaker

- Penny Sackett (born 1956), American-born Australian astronomer, educator, and manager
- Rita M. Sambruna, American astrophysicist studying supermassive black holes and jets
- Anneila Sargent (born 1942), Scottish–American astronomer specialized in star formation
- Ann Savage (1946–2017), British astronomer
- Caterina Scarpellini (1808–1873), Italian astronomer and meteorologist
- Susan M. Scott, Australian mathematical physicist working on general relativity, gravitational singularities, and black holes.
- Sara Seager (born 1971), Canadian-American astronomer and planetary scientist
- Waltraut Seitter (1930–2007), German astronomer and instructor
- Muriel Mussells Seyfert (1909–1997), American astronomer
- Pelageya Shajn (1894–1956), Russian astronomer searching for minor planets
- Aomawa Shields, American astrophysicist and professor researching exoplanets
- Carolyn S. Shoemaker (1929–2021), American astronomer
- Amy Simon, American planetary scientist
- Charlotte Moore Sitterly (1898–1990), American astronomer who studied stellar physics
- Tamara Mikhaylovna Smirnova (1935–2001), Russian astronomer who searched for minor planets and comets
- Alicia M. Soderberg (1977–2025), American astrophysicist and instructor focused on supernovae
- Mary Somerville (1780–1872), Scottish scientist, writer, and polymath
- Linda Spilker (born 1955), American planetary scientist
- Ingrid Stairs, Canadian astronomer
- Denise Stephens, American astronomer and instructor
- Sarah Stewart-Mukhopadhyay, American planetary scientist
- Annapurni Subramaniam, director of the Indian Institute of Astrophysics
- Karlina Leksono Supelli (born 1958), Indonesian philosopher and astronomer
- Jean Swank, American astrophysicist studying compact objects
- Henrietta Hill Swope (1902–1980), American astronomer who studied variable stars
- Nadezhda Sytinskaya (1906–1974), Soviet astronomer and planetary scientist
- Paula Szkody (born 1948), American astronomer and instructor specialized in cataclysmic variable stars

== T ==
- Jill Tarter (born 1944), American astronomer focused on SETI
- Florence Taylor Hildred (1865–1932), English astronomer and pastor
- Alenush Terian (1921–2011), Iranian-Armenian astronomer
- Michelle Thaller (born 1969), American astronomer and educator
- Jana Tichá (born 1965), Czech astronomer searching for minor planets
- Beatrice Tinsley (1941–1981), British-born New Zealand astronomer studying galactic evolution
- Maura Tombelli (born 1952), Italian amateur astronomer
- Christy A. Tremonti, American astronomer
- Virginia Louise Trimble (born 1943), American astronomer
- Lidiya Tseraskaya (1855–1931), Russian astronomer
- Margaret Turnbull (born 1975), American astronomer and astrobiologist
- Elizabeth Cornwall Tilley (born 1914), American astronomer

== U ==
- Anne Barbara Underhill (1920–2003), Canadian astrophysicist who studied massive stars
- Meg Urry, American astrophysicist studying supermassive black holes and galaxies

== V ==
- Bobbie Vaile (1959–1996), Australian astrophysicist and lecturer
- Zdeňka Vávrová (born 1945), Czech astronomer
- Faith Vilas, (born 1952), American planetary scientist
- Julie Vinter Hansen (1890–1960), Danish astronomer
- Mirjana Vukićević-Karabin (1933–2020), Serbian astrophysicist
- Emma Vyssotsky (1894–1975), American astronomer who studied astrometry

== W ==
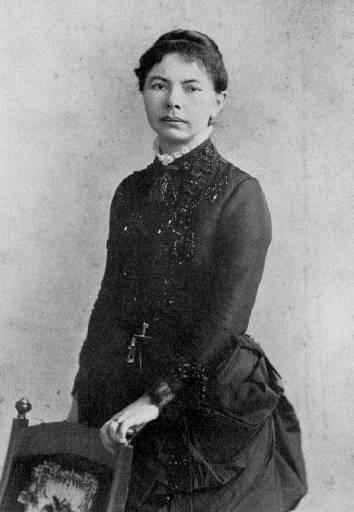
Sarah Frances Whiting (1847–1927)

- Lucianne Walkowicz (born 1979), American astronomer
- Wang Zhenyi (1768–1797), Chinese astronomer, mathematician, and poet
- Kim Weaver (born 1964), American astrophysicist and instructor focused on X-ray astronomy
- Sara Webb, Australian astrophysicist
- Alycia J. Weinberger, American astronomer studying planetary formation
- Mareta West (1915–1998), American astrogeologist
- Sarah Frances Whiting (1847–1927), American physicist, astronomer, and instructor
- Mary Watson Whitney (1847–1921), American astronomer and teacher
- Belinda Wilkes, English astrophysicist
- Beth Willman, American cosmologist
- Lee Anne Willson (born 1947), American astronomer
- Anna Winlock (1857–1904), American astronomer
- Jennifer Wiseman, American astrophysicist
- Rosemary Wyse (born 1957), Scottish astrophysicist and instructor
- Frances Woodworth Wright (1897–1989), American astronomer and educator
- Gillian Wright, Scottish astronomer
- Barbara A. Williams, American radio astronomer

== Y ==
- Ye Shuhua (born 1927), Chinese astronomer and instructor
- Anne Sewell Young (1871–1961), American astronomer who studied variable stars
- Judith Young (1952–2014), American physicist, astronomer, and educator
- Louise Gray Young (1935–2018), American astronomer and researcher

== Z ==
- Magdalena Zeger (around 1491–1568), calendar maker, astronomer, first women to publish independently in the field of astronomy
- Lyudmila Zhuravleva (born 1946), Russian-Ukrainian astronomer who discovered minor planets
- Maria Zuber (born 1958), American planetary scientist

== See also ==
- List of astronomers
- List of astronomical instrument makers
- List of French astronomers
- List of Russian astronomers and astrophysicists
- Annie Jump Cannon Award in Astronomy
