= Nova Puppis 1673 =

Probable nova seen in 1673

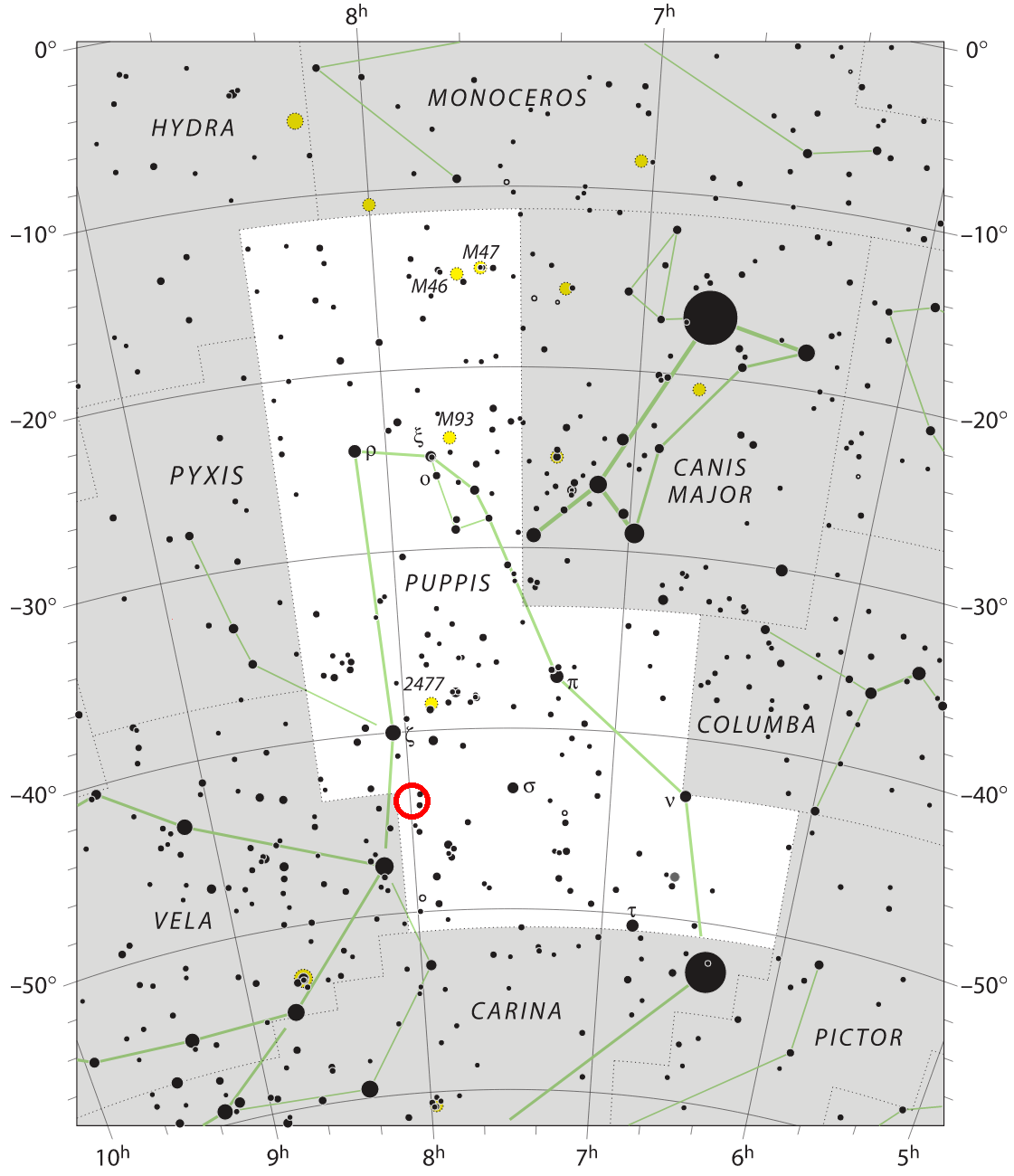
- Location of Nova Puppis 1673 (circled in red)

Observation data Epoch J2000 Equinox J2000
- Constellation: Puppis
- Right ascension: 07^{h} 59^{m} 01.0^{s}
- Declination: −43° 49′ 06″
- Apparent magnitude (V): 3.0–20.0

Characteristics
- Variable type: Nova?

Other designations
- NSV 3846, Zi 816

Database references
SIMBAD	data

Nova Puppis 1673, also known as NSV 3846, is a probable nova in the constellation Puppis. It was discovered by French astronomer Jean Richer on January 12, 1673 (and again observed on January 21) during the last year of an expedition Richer made to Cayenne, French Guiana. Richer measured its position on the sky using a mural quadrant, resulting in the most precise position available for a seventeenth-century nova that might be rediscovered by modern observers. At the time of its discovery the nova had a visual magnitude of 3, making it easily visible to the naked eye.

In 1987, German astronomer Hilmar Duerbeck published an ESO photographic survey image, marked with the position of a 20th-magnitude candidate for a modern identification of Nova Puppis 1673. However, subsequent spectral observations of that potential remnant of the nova showed narrow Balmer absorption lines against a blue continuum, features which are not typically seen in quiescent novae. Hence, Duerbeck's proposed identification could not be confirmed.
