= Carolina Ödman-Govender =

Swiss physicist and academic (1974–2022)

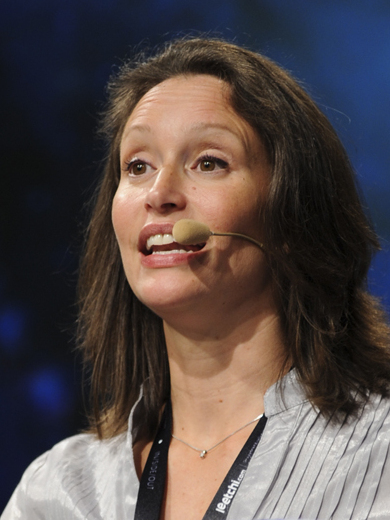
- Ödman-Govender in 2013
- Born: Carolina Ödman; July 3, 1974; Switzerland
- Died: 15 November 2022 (aged 48); Cape Town, South Africa
- Education: University of Cambridge; École Polytechnique Fédérale de Lausanne
- Scientific career
- Workplaces: Sapienza University of Rome; African Institute for Mathematical Sciences; Square Kilometre Array; Leiden University
- Website: odman.org

Carolina Ödman-Govender (German pronunciation: [karoˈliːnaː ˈœtman ˈgo:vəndɐ]) (3 July 1974 – 15 November 2022) was a Swiss physicist and academic who was professor of astrophysics at South Africa's University of the Western Cape. She was awarded the 2018 International Astronomical Union Special Executive Committee Award for Astronomy Outreach, Development and Education.

== Early life and education ==
Ödman grew up in Switzerland; her parents were Swedish. Inspired by her high school physics teacher, she pursued a career in the sciences. She studied physics at the École Polytechnique Fédérale de Lausanne and graduated in 2000. She earned her PhD at the University of Cambridge, where she was a member of Trinity Hall. She has also consulted for UNESCO, working on the impact of science and technology in society. She became interested in the philosophical aspects of science; for example, why people are interested in astronomy.

== Research and career ==
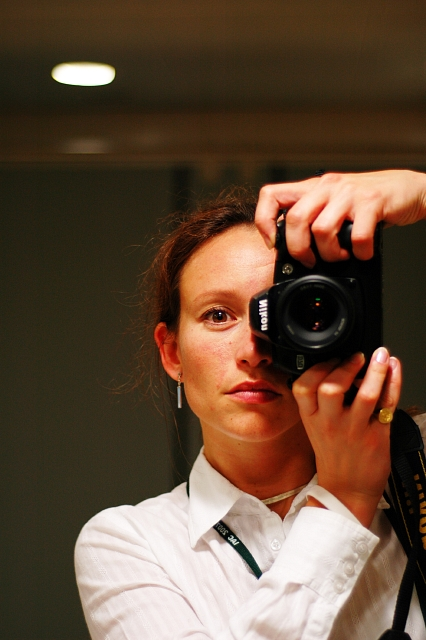
Carolina Ödman in 2007 self portrait

From 2004 to 2005 she was a Marie Curie Skłodowska postdoctoral scholar at Universita degli studi di Roma "La Sapienza". She worked in cosmology on several subjects as dark energy, analysis of cosmic microwave background data, and inflation. In 2005 Ödman joined Leiden University as an international project manager, where she worked with George Miley. Amongst other achievements, this involved setting up the Astronomy for Africa taskforce and leading Universe Awareness (UNAWE). Universe Awareness is an outreach programme that inspires children about astronomy, reaching over 400,000 children in over 60 countries. She joined the Square Kilometre Array project at the South African Astronomical Observatory in 2010. Ödman was made Director of Academic Development at the African Institute for Mathematical Sciences in 2011. In 2012 she received the Science Prize for Online Resources in Education (SPORE) award for her work on Universe Awareness. She was part of the team that created GalileoMobile project.

In 2018 Ödman was made associate director for development and outreach of the Inter-University Institute for Data Intensive Astronomy (IDIA) and an associate professor at the University of the Western Cape.

In 2021, she was awarded the 2020/2021 National Science and Technology Forum (NSTF)'s Communication Award, "for reshaping how science is communicated to the general public and in particular research into building a scientific vocabulary in African languages".

== Personal life and death ==
Ödman was married to Kevin Govender in South Africa. They had two sons.

In early 2018, Ödman was diagnosed with pancreatic adenocarcinoma. She died in Cape Town on 15 November 2022, at the age of 48.

== Publications ==
- Melchiorri, Alessandro; Mersini, Laura; Ödman, Carolina J.; Trodden, Mark (12 August 2003). "The state of the dark energy equation of state". Physical Review D. 68 (4) 043509. arXiv:astro-ph/0211522. Bibcode:2003PhRvD..68d3509M. doi:10.1103/physrevd.68.043509. ISSN 0556-2821. S2CID 119460205.
- Ödman, Carolina J. (2019). "Astronomy for Development – A story from South Africa". Proceedings of the International Astronomical Union. 15 (S367). Cambridge University Press (CUP): 168–175. doi:10.1017/s1743921321000867. ISSN 1743-9213. S2CID 245386517.
- Ödman-Govender, Carolina J; Kelleghan, Deirdre (26 August 2011). "Astronomical Perspectives for Young Children". Science. 333 (6046). American Association for the Advancement of Science (AAAS): 1106–1107. Bibcode:2011Sci...333.1106O. doi:10.1126/science.1196982. ISSN 0036-8075. PMID 21868665. S2CID 206529594.

== See also ==
- 552708 Ödmangovender, minor planet named after Ödman-Govender
