= Morabito =

Morabito is an Italian surname. Notable people with the surname include:

- Anthony Morabito (born 1991), Australian footballer
- Fabio Morábito (born 1955), Mexican writer and poet
- Giuseppe Morabito (born 1934), Italian criminal and an 'Ndrangheta boss
- Leah Morabito, Italian and American radio astronomer, professor in the UK
- Linda A. Morabito (born 1953), American astronomer
- Marco Morabito, Italian film producer and editor
- Rocco Morabito (photographer), American photographer
- Rocco Morabito (mobster, born 1960), Italian criminal, member of the 'Ndrangheta
- Rocco Morabito (mobster, born 1966), Italian criminal, member of the 'Ndrangheta
- Rossana Morabito (born 1969), Italian runner
- Steve Morabito (born 1983), Swiss road bicycle racer
- Tony Morabito (1910–1957), American football team founder, San Francisco 49ers

== Other uses ==
- Al-Morabito Mosque (Spanish: Mezquita El Morabito), Islamic place of worship in Córdoba, Spain
