= Nikole =

Nikole is a given name. Notable people with the name include:

- Nikole Beckwith, American actress
- Nikole Hannah-Jones (born 1976), American journalist
- Nikole Lewis, American researcher
- Nikole Lowe (born 1973), New Zealand tattoo artist
- Nikole Mitchell (born 1974), Jamaican Olympic athlete
- Nikole Schrepfer (born 1964), Swiss swimmer
- Nikole Zivalich (born 1987), American journalist

== See also ==
- Sveti Nikole, town in the Republic of Macedonia
- Sveti Nikole Municipality, municipality in eastern Republic of Macedonia
