= George K. Miley =

Irish-Dutch astronomer (born 1942)

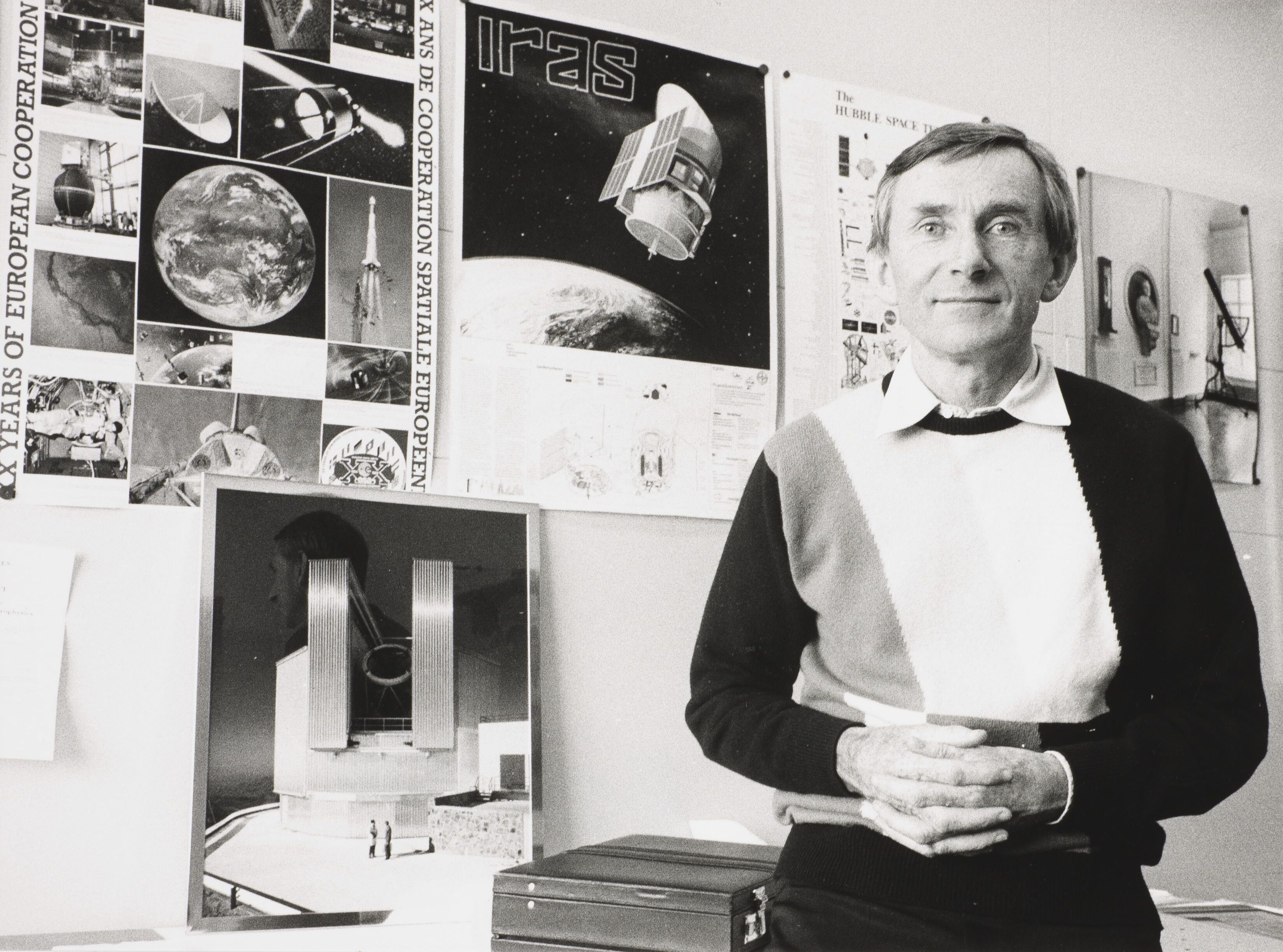
- Miley (1990)
- Born: 15 March 1942 (age 84); Dublin, Ireland
- Education: University College Dublin, University of Manchester
- Known for: astronomy, astronomy for development
- Scientific career
- Fields: astronomer
- Workplaces: Leiden Observatory
- Thesis: Measurements on discrete radio sources with long baseline interferometers at three frequencies (1969)
- Doctoral students: Leah Morabito

George Kildare Miley (born 15 March 1942) is an Irish-Dutch astronomer. He holds a professorship at Leiden University, where he served as director of Leiden Observatory from 1996 to 2003.

== Biography ==
After studying at Gonzaga College, Miley obtained his BSc in physics at University College Dublin in the years 1959–1963, and completed a PhD in radio astronomy at the University of Manchester in 1968. He was a research associate and assistant scientist at the National Radio Astronomy Observatory until 1970, when he moved to Leiden Observatory as a senior scientist.

He became astronomy professor at Leiden University in 1988, served as the observatory's scientific director 1996–2003, was appointed to a Royal Netherlands Academy of Arts and Sciences Professorship 2003–2008. While Miley remained anchored in Leiden, he accepted several visiting posts: He was a visiting professor at Lick Observatory 1977–1978, and a visiting scientist for the infrared astronomy satellite IRAS at the Jet Propulsion Laboratory 1981–1982. From 1984 to 1988 he was senior astronomer and head of academic affairs at the Space Telescope Science Institute in Baltimore, as well as an adjunct professor at Johns Hopkins University.

Miley served as vice-president of the International Astronomical Union from 2006 to 2012, where his focus was on astronomy and development.

== Research ==
In Manchester, Miley was active at Nuffield Radio Astronomy Laboratories in radio astronomy, where he was involved in developing long-baseline interferometry, a high-resolution technique that Miley used to study the properties of quasars. Miley continued this research during his stay at the National Radio Astronomy Observatory, establishing a relation between the size and distance of quasars.

Upon his transfer to Leiden, Miley began to work at the newly completed Westerbork Synthesis Radio Telescope (WSRT). In collaboration with the research group of Harry van der Laan, Miley used the WSRT to study distant radio galaxies, discovered head-tail radio galaxies in clusters, suggested that their radio tails were trails that traced their motion through the clusters and also pinpointed the position of the x-ray source Cygnus X-1, a black hole within our own galaxy.

Miley's sabbatical at Lick Observatory marked his transition from a radio astronomer to a multi-wavelength astronomer, aided by the development of digital astronomical cameras in the 1970s. While researching the "reddest" radio galaxies in the radio and optical regimes, he was involved in the discovery of some of the most distant galaxies known at the time. He expanded his wavelength range further by joining the science team responsible for the infrared satellite IRAS, working on the mission's pioneering deep infrared surveys. After his return to Leiden, Miley combined his knowledge of techniques optical and infrared astronomy to study further both radio galaxies and the gas that surrounds such galaxies, discovering some of the first cosmic evolution effects known for this class of galaxies.

While Miley's move to the Space Telescope Science Institute in Baltimore was motivated by a desire to observe with the Hubble Space Telescope, the Space Shuttle Challenger disaster delayed the space telescope's launch, he stayed on as the institute Head of Academic Affairs, continuing his research on high-redshift radio galaxies. After his return to Leiden as a professor in 1988, Miley and his colleagues demonstrated that bright radio galaxies could be used as beacons to locate the first galaxy clusters in the universe, allowing astronomers to examine previously unexplored structures in the early universe.

In 1997, Miley wrote a proposal for a new kind of low-frequency radio telescope, which would allow for an exploration of even earlier eras of the universe. Construction for this telescope, which Miley had dubbed LOFAR, for Low-Frequency Array, began in 2006, led by the Netherlands Institute for Radio Astronomy ASTRON. When the telescope was completed in 2017, it consisted of a phased array of 20,000 single antennae in 48 stations, located in the Netherlands, Germany, France, Poland, Great Britain, and Ireland.

== Education and development ==
Miley is an active academic teacher, having supervised more than 25 PhD theses since 1978. In 2004, he began to set up an astronomy education program aimed at inspiring young children in 2004, which eventually grew into the Universe Awareness educational program, a Cornerstone project of the UN-ratified IAU/UNESCO International Year of Astronomy in 2009 (IYA2009).

In 1973 Miley went on a lecture tour of China as the first astronomer to visit China after the Cultural Revolution. During his term as vice-president of the International Astronomical Union, Miley designed the IAU strategic plan "Astronomy for Development," whose main goal was to exploit astronomy for advancing the United Nations sustainable development goals.The strategic plan was adopted at the IAU General Assembly in Rio de Janeiro in August 2009. As part of the plan's implementation, the IAU established an Office of Astronomy for Development (OAD) at the South African Astronomical Observatory in Cape Town, South Africa, in 2011. For the creation and establishment of OAD, its director Kevin Govender and the IAU were jointly awarded the Edinburgh Medal in 2016.

== Honors and awards ==
- Royal Shell Oeuvre Prize 1996
- Leiden University Ceremonial “Dies Rede” Lecturer 1998
- Membership, Royal Netherlands Academy of Arts and Sciences 1998 -
- Royal Netherlands Academy of Arts and Sciences Professor 2003 - 2010
- The asteroid (6202) Georgemiley was named in his honour in 2003
- Vice President International Astronomical Union 2006 – 2012
- Advisor to IAU Executive Committee 2012 – 2015
- Knighthood of the Order of the Netherlands Lion, 2012
- Honorary Fellow, Royal Astronomical Society, 2013 -
- Member Board of Trustees, Associated Universities Inc. 2012 – 2022
- Honorary Trustee, Associated Universities Inc., 2022 -
- Symposium "Astronomy, Radio Sources and Society. The Wonderful Century. A Symposium Celebrating George Miley's Achievements", Leiden University, 10–13 June 2012
- Honorary Doctorate, Trinity College Dublin, 2017

== Links ==
- Homepage at Leiden University
