= María Luisa Aguilar =

Peruvian astronomer (1938–2015)

Maria Luisa Aguilar Hurtado
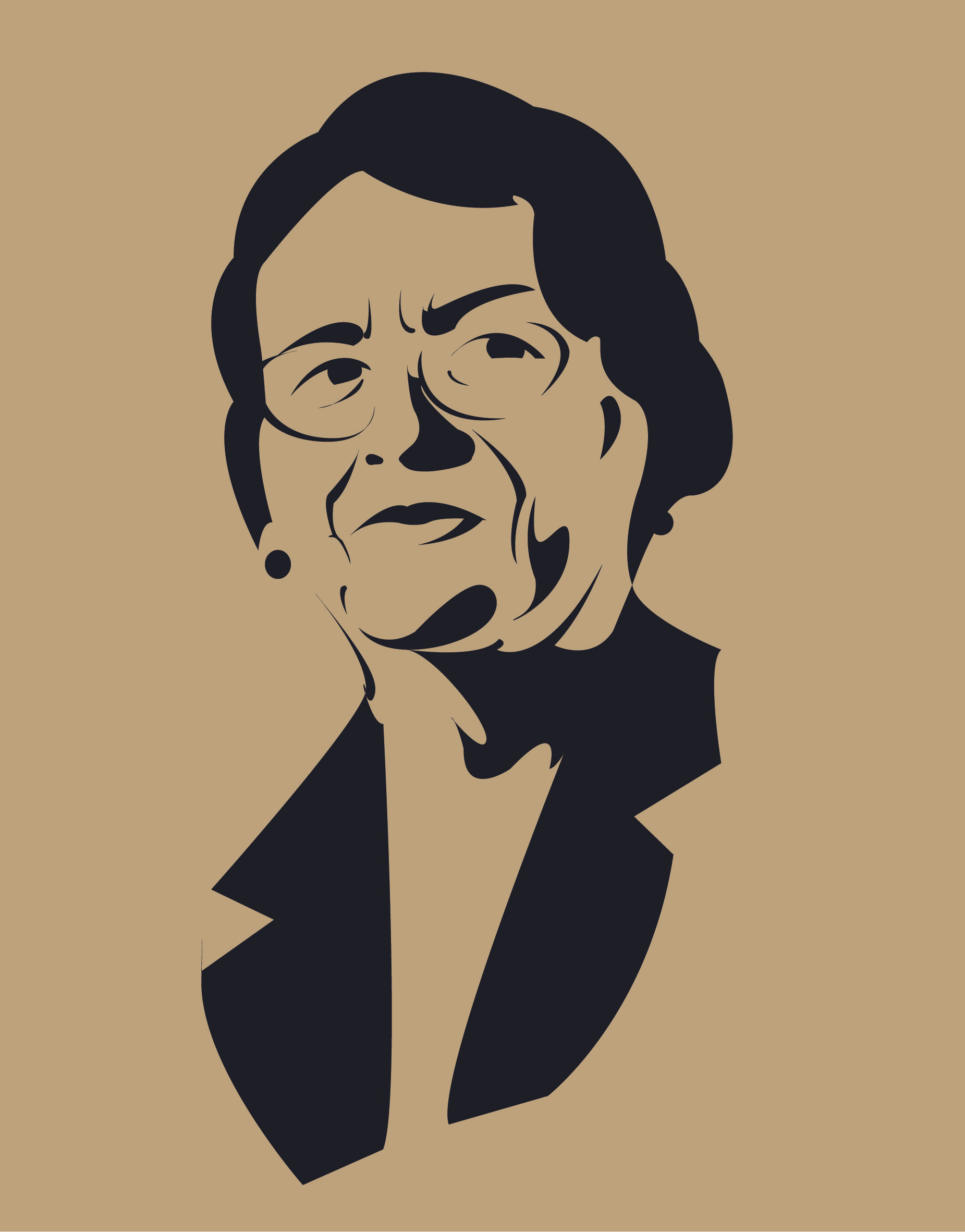
- Born: June 20, 1938; Jauja, Junín, Peru
- Died: October 29, 2015 (aged 77); Lima, Peru
- Education: National University of La Plata
- Known for: First Peruvian female astronomer
- Scientific career
- Fields: Astronomy, astrospectroscopy
- Workplaces: National University of San Marcos

María Luisa Aguilar Hurtado (20 June 1938 – 29 October 2015) was a Peruvian astronomer, the first professional one of Peru. She studied at the Institute of Mathematics and Physics of the National University of San Marcos in Lima, Peru. She graduated as an astronomer from the National University of La Plata, Argentina. In 1981, motivated to develop astronomy at a professional level, she founded and served as director of the "Astronomy and Astrophysics Seminar", nowadays called "Permanent Astronomy and Space Sciences Seminar" of the National University of San Marcos.

== Biography ==
She was born in Jauja, the city where she lived during her first three years. Her primary and secondary studies were carried out in Lima, in the Elvira García y García Mayor School Unit. In 1958 she entered the School of Mathematics of the National University of San Marcos. She traveled to Argentina to study astronomy at the Astronomy and Geophysics Observatory of the National University of La Plata; there was no such professional specialty in Peru during that time. She specialized in astronomical spectroscopy, stellar atmospheres, and variable stars.

In 1969, she returned to Peru and began teaching at the National University of Engineering and at the National University of San Marcos. In those first years, she created the "Astronomical Fridays", a space for the dissemination of astronomy that has remained until today, becoming the oldest series of uninterrupted talks and conferences in the history of Peru.

In 1981, Maria Aguilar founded the Astronomy and Astrophysics Seminar, renamed in 2001 as the Permanent Astronomy and Space Sciences Seminar - SPACE.

In 1982 she was recognized as a Member of the International Astronomical Union, being part of commission 46 Astronomy Education and Development, and commission C1 WG Network for Astronomy School Education (NASE).

In January 1984, she promoted and managed the "San Marcos - International Astronomical Union agreement", enabling the first Visiting Lecturer Program of the International Astronomical Union in Peru. In 1985, she coordinated the arrival of doctors José Luis Sérsic, Argentine, and specialist in galaxies, Josip Kleczek, Czech, Sun scholar, and Jorge Sahade, first Latin American president of the International Astronomical Union.

She was an enthusiastic collaborator in science and astronomy topics in Sunday's supplement of the Peruvian newspaper "El Comercio" between 1999 and 2000.

As part of the global activities for the celebrations of the International Year of Astronomy 2009, she was designated as "Single Point of Contact" between Peru and the International Astronomical Union, promoting and participating in a series of activities of education and outreach in Peru for that year, such as the "Astronomical Fridays", "Itinerant Telescope", the "Galileo Teacher Training Program" and "Galileo Mobile", among others.

Aguilar was the promoter of the San Marcos Astronomical Observatory for Education and Tourism Project in Maranganí, Cusco, which was inaugurated after her death in 2016.

In her last years, she was the host of the program "Culture, Science and Technology" on Radio Cielo, and "Science and Culture", on the program "Faces of Culture", on Juan 19 TV.

Maria Aguilar was portrayed as one of the main characters of the theater play "Our great adventure in science" directed by Rocio Lino and written by Paola Vicente Chocano.

Aguilar died on June 20, 2015, at the age of 77.

== Honors and affiliations ==
- Past Member of Division C Education, Outreach and Heritage, IAU (until 2015)
- Past Member of Commission C1 Astronomy Education and Development, IAU (2015)
- Past Member of Commission 46 Astronomy Education & Development, IAU (until 2015)
- Past Member of Commission C1 WG Network for Astronomy School Education (NASE), IAU (2015)
- Past Member of Division XII Union-Wide Activities, IAU (until 2012)
- Medal of Honor "José Antonio Encinas", awarded by the Magisterial Derrama (2010)
