= Rebecca Elson =

Canadian writer and astronomer

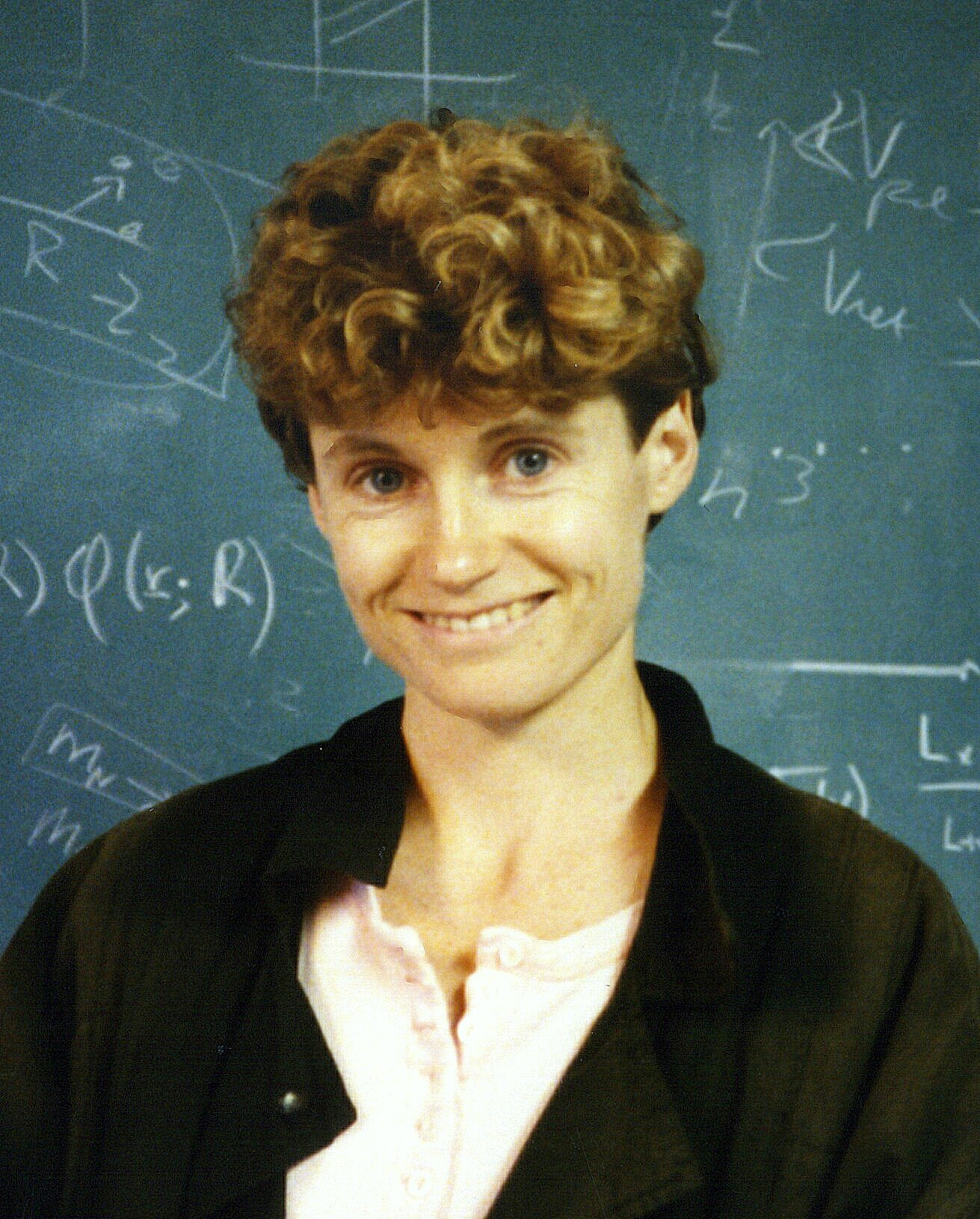
- Elson (1987) in front of a blackboard with formulae for velocity V and stellar luminosity L*
- Born: Rebecca Anne Wood Elson; 2 January 1960; Montreal, Quebec, Canada
- Died: 19 May 1999 (aged 39); Cambridge, England
- Education: Smith College; University of British Columbia; University of Cambridge
- Spouse: Angelo di Cintio (m. 1996)
- Scientific career
- Fields: Astronomy
- Workplaces: Institute for Advanced Study; Harvard University; University of Cambridge
- Thesis: The rich star clusters in the Large Magellanic Cloud (1986)
- Doctoral advisor: S. Michael Fall

Rebecca Anne Wood Elson (2 January 1960 – 19 May 1999) was a Canadian–American astronomer and writer.

== Early life and education ==
Rebecca "Becky" Anne Wood Elson was born in Montreal, Quebec, to Jeanne Bridgman, née Hickey and John Albert Elson (1923–2010), a geologist and professor at McGill University. Her older sister, Sally was born in 1958. As a teenager Elson often travelled Canada with her geologist father as he performed field research.

Elson matriculated at Smith College in 1976, at the age of 16. After initially choosing biology, with a particular interest in genetics, she then transferred to astronomy and was taught by Waltraut Seitter, earning her bachelor's degree in 1980. Her degree included a placement at the University of St Andrews in Scotland.

Elson gained a master's degree in physics from the University of British Columbia, funded by a postgraduate fellowship from the Canadian Natural Sciences and Engineering Research Council, resulting in a thesis An investigation of models of dynamical friction. During this time she undertook summer study visits to the University of St Andrews, and the Royal Observatory, Edinburgh, which led to her first published research article and her interest in globular clusters of stars.

Elson undertook her PhD (1982–1986) at the Institute of Astronomy and Christ’s College Cambridge University where she was awarded an Isaac Newton Studentship, an overseas research student award, and a vice chancellor’s bursary.

Her primary supervisor was S. Michael Fall and while working on her PhD she spent time at the Mount Stromlo Observatory in Canberra and Siding Spring observatory Coonabarabran, New South Wales, working under Ken Freeman.

This period led to several scientific articles, and her PhD thesis, The rich star clusters in the Large Magellanic Cloud which developed the Elson-Fall-Freeman (EFF) luminosity profile and resulted in the discovery of unexpectedly extended profiles in star clusters in the Large Magellanic Cloud.

== Career in astronomy ==
Elson did her postdoctoral work at the Institute for Advanced Study under the supervision of John N. Bahcall, continuing her star cluster work using ground-based telescopes when plans to use the new capabilities of the Hubble Space Telescope were affected by its delayed launch following the Challenger space shuttle disaster.

In 1987, she was the first-named author on a major review article on star clusters for the Annual Review of Astronomy and Astrophysics, after which she took up a Bunting Fellowship at Radcliffe College in 1989, where she taught creative writing, followed by a term teaching a Harvard expository writing course on science and ethics.

In 1989 she was the youngest astronomer selected to serve on a US National Academy of Sciences decennial review of the field.

In the early 1990s she returned to the Institute of Astronomy at Cambridge, UK to accept the research position she would hold for the remainder of her life. Her work centered on globular clusters, chemical evolution and galaxy formation. In April 1990 as the first images were released from the Hubble Space Telescope, astronomers were disappointed that the images were spoiled by the spherical aberration in the space telescope mirror. When Hubble was repaired the resulting sharp images led to an acceleration of research, Elson's team successfully bidding for one of the largest allocations of observation orbits at that time.

== Author ==
A volume of wide-ranging poetry and essays she wrote from her teens until shortly before her death was published posthumously as A Responsibility to Awe in 2001 in the United Kingdom, and in 2002 in the United States. The works were selected by her husband Angelo di Cintio and a friend and fellow poet, Anne Berkeley, from a much larger body of unpublished efforts. Some of the works refer to vast concepts of physics and astronomy, often in unexpectedly abstract or playful ways, to reflect aspects of human experience. Others reflect profound joy with life or poignant observations of her impending death. The collection was selected as one of the best books of the year by The Economist.

Elson was lead author on or contributed to seventy scientific contributions, including thirty-eight major articles in the refereed scientific literature research papers in her short career.

== Death and legacy ==
Elson was diagnosed with non-Hodgkin's lymphoma at the age of 29. With treatment, it went into remission, and in 1996, she married the Italian artist Angelo di Cintio. However, the cancer returned soon afterwards. Elson died of the disease in Cambridge in May 1999, at the age of 39.

Rebecca Elson's biography was published by the Oxford Dictionary of National Biography on 13 August 2020 as part of their collection of biographies of astronomers and mathematicians.

== Selected works ==
- Elson, Rebecca (2018). Berkeley, Anne; Di Cintio, Angelo; O'Donoghue, Bernard (eds.). A Responsibility to Awe. Carcanet Press. ISBN 9781784106560. OCLC 1059451192.
- The first translation in the Spanish-speaking world was made by Estíbaliz Espinosa Río into Galician. Elson, Rebecca (2023). Espinosa, Estíbaliz (ed.). Un compromiso co asombro. Translated by Espinosa, Estíbaliz. Galaxia Editorial. ISBN 9788411761413.
