= Carole Mundell =

Observational astrophysicist

Carole Mundell FInstP
- Education: University of Glasgow
- Known for: Gamma Ray Bursts, Extragalactic Astronomy
- Scientific career
- Fields: Astrophysics; Cosmology; Black holes; Astronomy
- Workplaces: University of Bath; University of Maryland; University of Manchester
- Thesis: Distribution and Kinematics of Neutral and Ionised Gas in Seyfert Galaxies (1995)
- Website: Research Profile

Carole Mundell is an observational astrophysicist who researches cosmic black holes and gamma ray bursts. Since 2023 she has been the Director of Science at the European Space Agency.

== Education ==
Mundell graduated from the University of Glasgow with a BSc in Physics and Astronomy in 1992. She moved to Manchester to complete a PhD in Astrophysics, working at the Jodrell Bank Observatory, where she held a PPARC Research Fellowship until 1997.

== Research ==
Mundell joined the University of Maryland in 1997. She moved to Liverpool John Moores University in 1999 as a Royal Society University Research Fellow focussing on the dynamics of active galaxies. In 2005 she was awarded a prestigious RCUK Academic Fellowship to build and lead new Gamma Ray Burst team at LJMU, and was appointed Professor in 2007. In 2007 her team won the Times Higher Education Research Project of the Year Award for 'Measuring Gamma Ray Bursts'.

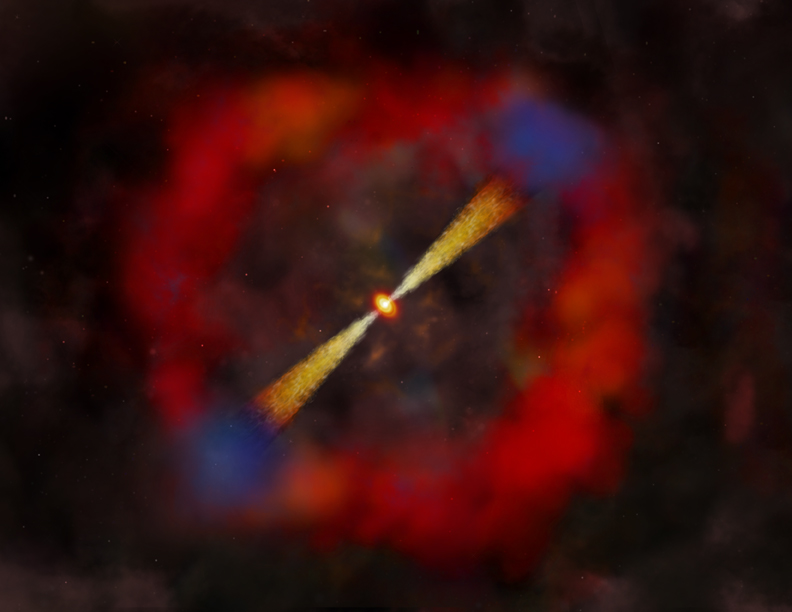
Chandra Gamma Ray Burst 01

Mundell has played a leading role in the understand Gamma Ray Bursts, developing robotic telescopes that can capture the extremely fast jets. In 2011 she won a Royal Society Wolfson Merit Award for her research on "Black Hole-Driven Explosions and the Dynamic Universe". In 2012 whilst at Liverpool, Mundell co-designed and built RINGO2, a telescope to measure the polarisation of optical light produced after a gamma ray burst. The telescope was designed to react quickly to notifications from NASA's Swift Satellite. She has described the gamma-ray bursts as "the most extreme particle accelerators in the universe", which offer opportunities for testing "laws of physics". In 2014, her team won a Vice Chancellor's medal for Research Scholarship.

In 2015, Mundell joined the University of Bath, and was Head of the Department of Physics from 2016 to 2018. She established a new Astrophysics research group, concentrating on high-energy extragalactic astrophysics of black hole driven systems and their environments. She uses the NASA Fermi Gamma-ray Space Telescope to detect short-lived gamma ray bursts. She regularly discusses her research with the public. In 2017 she arranged a scientific discussion meeting on "The promises of gravitational-wave astronomy" at the Royal Society.

== Public engagement ==
Since 2015, she has been a member of the Science and Technology Facilities Council (STFC) and chair of the STFC Skills and Engagement Advisory Board. She is a member of the Research Councils UK Public Engagement with Research Advisory Panel.

Mundell is involved with several campaigns to improve representation of women in astronomy. In 2016, Mundell won the Woman of the Year Award at the FDM Everywoman in Technology Awards. Mundell has called for better support for students facing sexual harassment within higher education, and been involved with the UK's 1752 Group.

== See also ==
- List of women in leadership positions on astronomical instrumentation projects
- List of women astronomers
- List of astronomers
