= Rosina Dafter =

Australian astronomer

- Born: March 15, 1875; London, United Kingdom
- Died: June 9, 1959 (aged 84)

Rosina Dafter (née Fitton), FRAS (15 March 1875 – 9 June 1959) was an astronomer and the first Australian woman to be made a fellow of the Royal Astronomical Society. She re-discovered comet 7P/Pons–Winnecke in 1927 and was responsible for the discovery of previously unobserved variable stars in the constellation Carina.

== Life ==
Dafter was born in London to Margaret and Richard Fitton, a pianoforte maker. She was educated at Holy Trinity Church School in London and started work as a dress designer before her marriage to John Albert Dafter on 20 November 1898. The couple arrived in Australia in 1910 and settled in Northgate with their two foster sons who were merchant mariners.

While she had an interest in stars from childhood and studied mathematics as a hobby, it was not until her arrival in Australia that Dafter sought advice and began teaching herself astronomy.

In 1923, Dafter was elected a member of the British Astronomical Association which had a branch in New South Wales. She was the southern observer for the Association for three decades, and was also a member of the New Zealand Astronomical Association and the American Association of Variable Star Observers.

Dafter gathered the data for Brisbane as part of a larger research project involving Broken Hill and Japan that aimed to obtain simultaneous photometric data across the three sites.

She also provided details of astronomical events to local newspapers, held public talks on Astronomy and was published in numerous journals.

Dafter died in 1959.
