= Kirsten Kraiberg Knudsen =

Professor of astrophysics

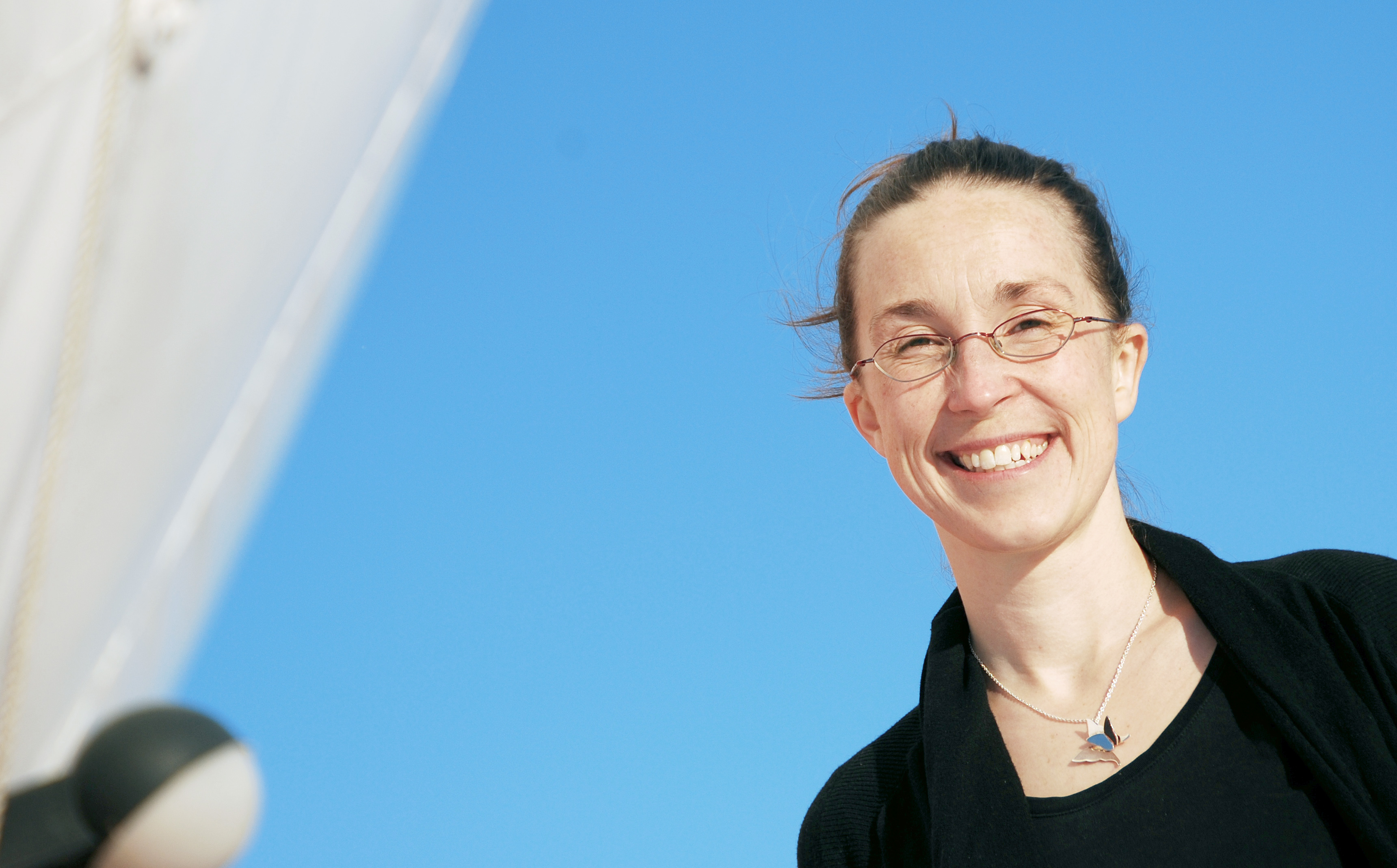
- Kirsten Kraiberg Knudsen in front of the 20 m radio telescope at Onsala Space Observatory, Sweden
- Education: University of Copenhagen; University of Leiden
- Known for: Extragalactic astrophysics
- Scientific career
- Workplaces: Chalmers University of Technology

Kirsten Kraiberg Knudsen is a professor of astrophysics in the department of Space, Earth and Environment at Chalmers University of Technology. Her research concerns galaxy formation and evolution.

She is a member of the Swedish Young Academy and the International Astronomical Union (IAU)

== Early life and education ==
Knudsen studied at the University of Copenhagen, and at the University of Leiden where she received a PhD.

== Research and career ==
Knudsen's research focuses particularly on star forming galaxies at cosmological distances. She uses large, modern telescopes such as ALMA, VLT, IRAM PdBI, and VLA to study the properties of redshift z=2–7 (lensed) submillimeter galaxies and quasar host galaxies.

== Awards and honours ==
- 2018 Birger Karlsson Award
- 2012 Wallenberg Academy Fellow
