= Luisa Rebull =

Senior Research Scientist at IPAC-Caltech

- Education: College of William and Mary, UChicago
- Known for: Research on low-mass stars
- Scientific career
- Fields: Astrophysics
- Workplaces: IPAC-Caltech
- Doctoral advisor: Douglas Duncan

Luisa Rebull is an American astrophysicist and a senior research scientist at IPAC-Caltech. In addition, she is the director of the NASA/IPAC Teacher Archive Research Program (NITARP), formerly the Spitzer Space Telescope Program for Teachers and Students, and a communications and testing lead at the Infrared Science Archive (IRSA).

Rebull has more than 500 published papers. Her work centers on formation and chemical evolution of low-mass stars with a focus on the rotation and accretion of their disks.

== Early life and education ==
In elementary school, she recalled feeling out of place for being interested in engineering, especially as she was the only girl in her class who was interested in LEGOs.

Rebull received a bachelor's degree in physics from the College of William and Mary in 1992. She then went on to obtain her master's from UChicago in astronomy and astrophysics in 1993. At Chicago, she received her Ph.D. in astronomy and astrophysics in 2000 under the guidance of Douglas K. Duncan. She then joined NASA and completed her postdoctoral studies as a National Research Council fellow at the Jet Propulsion Laboratory from 2000-2002 before working for IPAC full-time.

== Career and research ==
Rebull's research focused on the rotation of young stars in the Orion Nebula Cluster. She has primarily expanded on this work at NASA with the help of the Spitzer Space Telescope. The Spitzer Telescope was built to detect infrared radiation and was the first to detect light from a planet outside of the Solar System. Rebull and her team have used Spitzer extensively to conduct their observations of young stars and their chemical abundances.

In 2011, Rebull's team used Spitzer to capture a comprehensive image of the North American nebula. In doing so, they were able to identify 2000 new stars in this particular region, and also captured the process of star formation.

Spitzer went out of commission on January 30, 2020, but its focus on infrared light has led to multiple observations of galaxies and stars forming.

Rebull's work also focuses on democratizing astronomical data at the IRSA. As a part of this role, she writes documentation and tests software that streamlines usage and simplifies access to this data.

== Outreach ==
In graduate school, she founded an organization, the Chicago Public Schools/University of Chicago Internet Project, or CUIP, that brought the internet to 29 schools in urban Chicago. As a part of this program, she also co-founded an initiative to incorporate resources from the internet to curricula in secondary schools.

After joining NASA, she was soon onboarded to NITARP. In this program, teachers are partnered with a professional astronomer to conduct original research with astronomical data and present their work at the American Astronomical Society. Teachers are also encouraged to involve their students throughout the entire period of the program (13 months).

== Awards ==
Rebull has received multiple accolades for her work in community service. In 1997, she was a recipient of the 1997 University of Chicago President's Service Award. In addition, in 1998, she was presented with the Donald E. MacMinn Award for Service Beyond the Walls of the University (UChicago).

Rebull has also received awards on behalf of NITARP. Her team received the NASA Group Achievement award in 2007 "for significant contributions to Education and Public Outreach and for an outstanding performance in developing and implementing the Spitzer Space Telescope observing program." NITARP also received the NASA Group Achievement Award in 2011 "for inspiring teachers and future scientists through participation in actual astronomical research collaborations."

== Selected publications ==
- Young Stellar Object Candidates in IC 417
- Rotation of young low-mass stars in the Orion Nebula Cluster flanking fields
- A Catalog of Point Sources Toward NGC 1333
- MIPSGAL: A Survey of the Inner Galactic Plane at 24 and 70 μm
- The Multiband Imaging Photometer for Spitzer (MIPS)
