= Marjorie Hall Harrison =

British astronomer

Marjorie Hall Harrison (September 14, 1918 – August 6, 1986) was an English-born American astronomer.

Hall was born in Nottingham, England in September 1918. In 1947, she authored one of the first scientific books, a dissertation while at the Yerkes Observatory of the University of Chicago, with the word "model" in the title. This work describes the processes that fuel stars and is among the first works that endeavored to create detailed mathematical models for complex physical systems. Along with Subrahmanyan Chandrasekhar, George Gamow and G. Keller, Harrison published models in 1944, 1946 and 1947 discussing stars modeled with hydrogen-depleted and isothermal cores. As a doctoral student of S. Chandrasekhar at the University of Chicago, she received a degree in astronomy in 1947.

A brother, Cecil Hall, was one of Eli Franklin Burton's graduate students who built the first practical electron microscope at the University of Toronto in 1938. Hall Harrison died in Huntsville, Texas in August 1986 at the age of 67.
