= Rita M. Sambruna =

Italian astrophysicist

Rita M. Sambruna OMRI HonFRAS
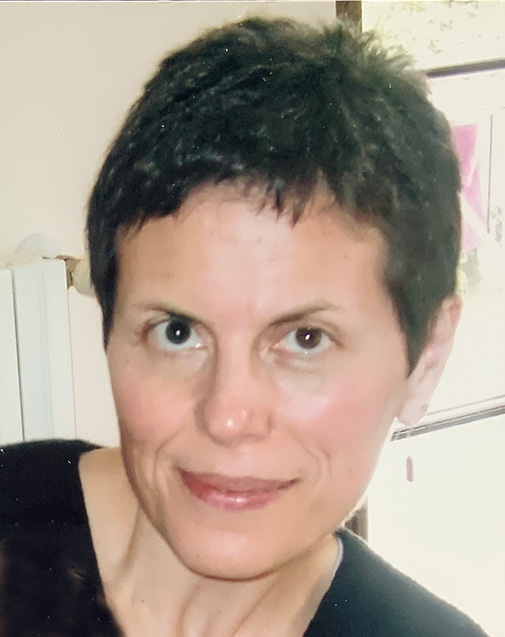
- Rita Sambruna
- Education: University of Milan, International School for Advanced Studies
- Awards: Fellow, American Physical Society (2020); Fellow, American Astronomical Society (2021); Commendatore, OMRI, (2021); Fellow, American Association for the Advancement of Science (2022); Robert H. Goddard Honor Award (2022); Honorary Fellow, Royal Astronomical Society (2023)
- Scientific career
- Fields: Astrophysics
- Workplaces: National Aeronautics and Space Administration; George Mason University
- h-index = 60

Rita M. Sambruna OMRI HonFRAS is an Italian-American astrophysicist whose research has focused on active galactic nuclei (AGN), relativistic jets, supermassive black holes, compact objects, and multiwavelength and multi-messenger astrophysics. She is Deputy Director of the Astrophysics Science Division at NASA's Goddard Space Flight Center.

Sambruna has made contributions to the study of the formation and radiation properties of relativistic jets produced by supermassive black holes, particularly through X-ray and multiwavelength observations. She was elected a Fellow of the American Physical Society in 2020, a Fellow of the American Astronomical Society in 2021, and a 2022 Fellow of the American Association for the Advancement of Science. She was appointed a Commendatore (Commander) of the Order of Merit of the Italian Republic in 2021 and was elected an Honorary Fellow of the Royal Astronomical Society in 2023.

== Early life and education ==
Sambruna was born in northern Italy near Como, where she lived for the first 29 years of her life. She received a Laurea degree in physics from the University of Milan in 1989. Her undergraduate thesis concerned X-ray observations of magnetic cataclysmic variables.

She subsequently studied astrophysics at the International School for Advanced Studies (SISSA) in Trieste, receiving an M.Phil. in astrophysics in 1992 and a Ph.D. in astrophysics in 1994. Her graduate research included studies of the X-ray properties of blazars.

During the final year of her graduate studies, Sambruna worked at the Space Telescope Science Institute in Baltimore with astrophysicist C. Megan Urry.

== Research career ==
Following her doctorate, Sambruna held a postdoctoral position at the Space Telescope Science Institute before receiving a National Research Council Research Fellowship at NASA's Goddard Space Flight Center. At Goddard she worked on high-energy observations of active galactic nuclei and relativistic jets. She subsequently worked as a research associate at Pennsylvania State University, where she participated in research associated with the Chandra X-ray Observatory.

Sambruna's research has concentrated on active galactic nuclei and the relativistic jets associated with supermassive black holes. Her work has particularly emphasized the X-ray and multiwavelength properties of extragalactic jets.

Her research helped establish the high-energy properties of extragalactic relativistic jets through X-ray and multiwavelength observations. Sambruna and her collaborators studied high-energy radiation from jets over a wide range of physical scales, from regions near the central black hole to distances beyond the host galaxy. Her research has used observations from facilities including the Hubble Space Telescope, Chandra X-ray Observatory, XMM-Newton, and Fermi Gamma-ray Space Telescope.

The Royal Astronomical Society has described Sambruna's work on relativistic jets as "pioneering and foundational", particularly her development of the role of X-ray observations in understanding jets in active galaxies. Her research has contributed to understanding the formation and radiative properties of relativistic jets and their relationship to supermassive black holes and active galaxies.

Her research interests have subsequently expanded to include multiwavelength and multi-messenger astrophysics, including the study of compact objects and supermassive black holes.

== George Mason University ==
From 2000 to 2005, Sambruna was the Clare Boothe Luce Professor of Physics and Astronomy at George Mason University. She taught undergraduate and graduate courses, mentored students, and led an independently funded research program in astrophysics.

While at George Mason, Sambruna received a National Science Foundation CAREER Award, which supported her research from 2003 to 2005, and a NASA Long-Term Space Astrophysics award, which supported work from 2002 to 2005.

== NASA career ==
In 2005, Sambruna joined NASA's Goddard Space Flight Center as a senior scientist, conducting multiwavelength research on relativistic jets and active galaxies.

In 2010, she moved to NASA Headquarters in Washington, D.C., where she held a series of science-management and leadership positions in NASA's Astrophysics Division. Her work included program responsibilities in high-energy and gravitational astrophysics and strategic planning for NASA astrophysics.

Sambruna was involved in NASA planning associated with the 2020 Astronomy and Astrophysics Decadal Survey. In 2019, NASA awarded her the Exceptional Achievement Medal for her leadership of NASA's studies supporting the decadal survey.

In July 2020, she became Deputy Director of the Astrophysics Science Division at Goddard Space Flight Center. In that role, she shares responsibility for the scientific and organizational leadership of the division, which encompasses astrophysics research, technology development, and space-flight projects and programs.

From September 2022 to May 2023, Sambruna also served as Acting Deputy Director of Goddard's Sciences and Exploration Directorate.

Sambruna has supported the development of multi-messenger astrophysics at Goddard. She led a team that developed a vision for a Multi-Messenger Astrophysics Science Support Center intended to help coordinate NASA and ground-based observations of astrophysical sources.

== Awards and honors ==
Sambruna received a National Research Council Research Fellowship from 1995 to 1997 and held the Clare Boothe Luce Professorship at George Mason University from 2000 to 2005.

She received a National Science Foundation CAREER Award and a NASA Long-Term Space Astrophysics award while at George Mason University.

In 2019, NASA awarded Sambruna the Exceptional Achievement Medal for her leadership of studies supporting the 2020 Astronomy and Astrophysics Decadal Survey.

She was elected a Fellow of the American Physical Society in 2020 and a Fellow of the American Astronomical Society in 2021.

In 2021, Sambruna was appointed a Commendatore (Commander) of the Order of Merit of the Italian Republic (Ordine al Merito della Repubblica Italiana, OMRI). The decoration was formally presented by Italian Ambassador to the United States Mariangela Zappia at a ceremony at Villa Firenze, the ambassador's residence in Washington, D.C., on 28 April 2022.

Sambruna was elected a 2022 Fellow of the American Association for the Advancement of Science, in the organization's Astronomy section.

In 2023, she was elected an Honorary Fellow of the Royal Astronomical Society. The Society recognized her contributions to the study of relativistic jets in active galaxies as well as her leadership and service at NASA.
