= GalileoMobile =

Educational non-profit organization

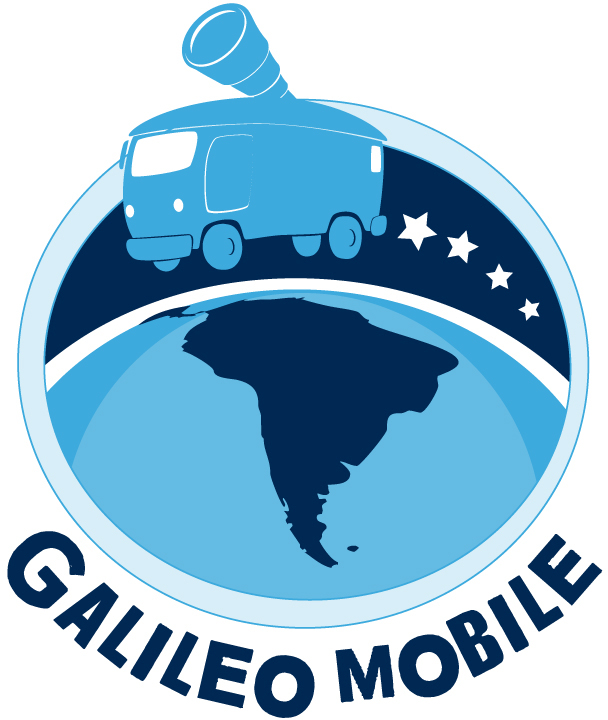
GalileoMobile logo

GalileoMobile is a non-profit science education organization that brings astronomy closer to young people worldwide.

The GalileoMobile emphasis is on regions with little or no access to knowledge about astronomy. Created in late 2008 on an inspiration from the 2009 International Year of Astronomy, GalileoMobile is run by a group of astronomers, educators, and science communicators.

The GalileoMobile team organises workshops for teachers and astronomy-related activities for students in schools and villages To encourage follow-up activities GalileoMobile also donates a Galileoscope or a "You are Galileotelescope" a copy of the GalileoMobile Handbook, a UNAWE Earthball, and other educational material.

In GalileoMobile's first project the team travelled across the Andes High Plateau in Chile, Bolivia, and Peru in 2009. Since then, GalileoMobile has been to Bolivia (2012), India (2012), Uganda (2013), Bolivia and Brazil (2014), and Colombia (2014). Some team members have also carried out activities in Portugal, Nepal, United States, the Dominican Republic, Haiti, and Guatemala.

In 2015, GalileoMobile started the Constellation project. This project brings together schools from Argentina, Bolivia, Brazil, Chile, Colombia, Ecuador and Peru to create a South American network of schools . Their students were able to take part in "Space Exploration", a series of astronomical outreach activities created especially for this project. GalileoMobile continues to support independently organising astronomical outreach in the Constellation group

The IAU decided to endorse Constellation as a Major Cosmic Light programme of the International Year of Light 2015. The Office for Astronomical Development sponsored about 30% of the project.
