= Christy A. Tremonti =

American astrophysicist

- Education: Johns Hopkins University; University of Arizona; Colgate University
- Occupation: Associate Professor at University of Wisconsin–Madison
- Known for: Astronomy
- Website: http://www.astro.wisc.edu/our-people/faculty/tremonti/

Christy A. Tremonti is an observational astronomer on the faculty at the University of Wisconsin–Madison. She was a 2005 Hubble Fellow while at the University of Arizona. She received her PhD from Johns Hopkins University in 2003 and her BS from Colgate University in 1994. She completed her dissertation, "The physical properties of low redshift star forming galaxies: Insights from the space-UV and 20,000 SDSS spectra", under the supervision of Timothy M. Heckman.

Tremonti's primary interests involve galaxy formation and evolution, including star-forming galaxies, active galactic nucleus (AGN) feedback, galactic winds, and galaxy mergers. She is also interested in spectroscopy and data mining, and is a member of the Sloan Digital Sky Survey. She has over sixty journal articles in publications including the Astronomical Journal, Astrophysical Journal, and the Monthly Notices of the Royal Astronomical Society. Most of her articles can be found in full text on the arXiv. Tremonti has over 150 co-authors across her publications. Some of her most frequent collaborators are Timothy M. Heckman, Jon V. Brinkmann, and Donald P. Schneider. According to Scopus, her h-index as of March, 2015 is 44.

As of March 15, 2015, Tremonti's top three most highly cited articles present research about the Sloan Digital Sky Survey, including the most highly cited article on which Tremonti was lead author, "The origin of the mass-metallicity relation: Insights from 53,000 star-forming galaxies in the Sloan Digital Sky Survey". She was one of the first to use the Sloan Digital Sky Survey's statistical power for galaxy evolution studies.

Tremonti is a member of the International Astronomical Union.
