= Ingeborg Brun =

Danish amateur astronomer, socialist

Ingeborg Brun Globe
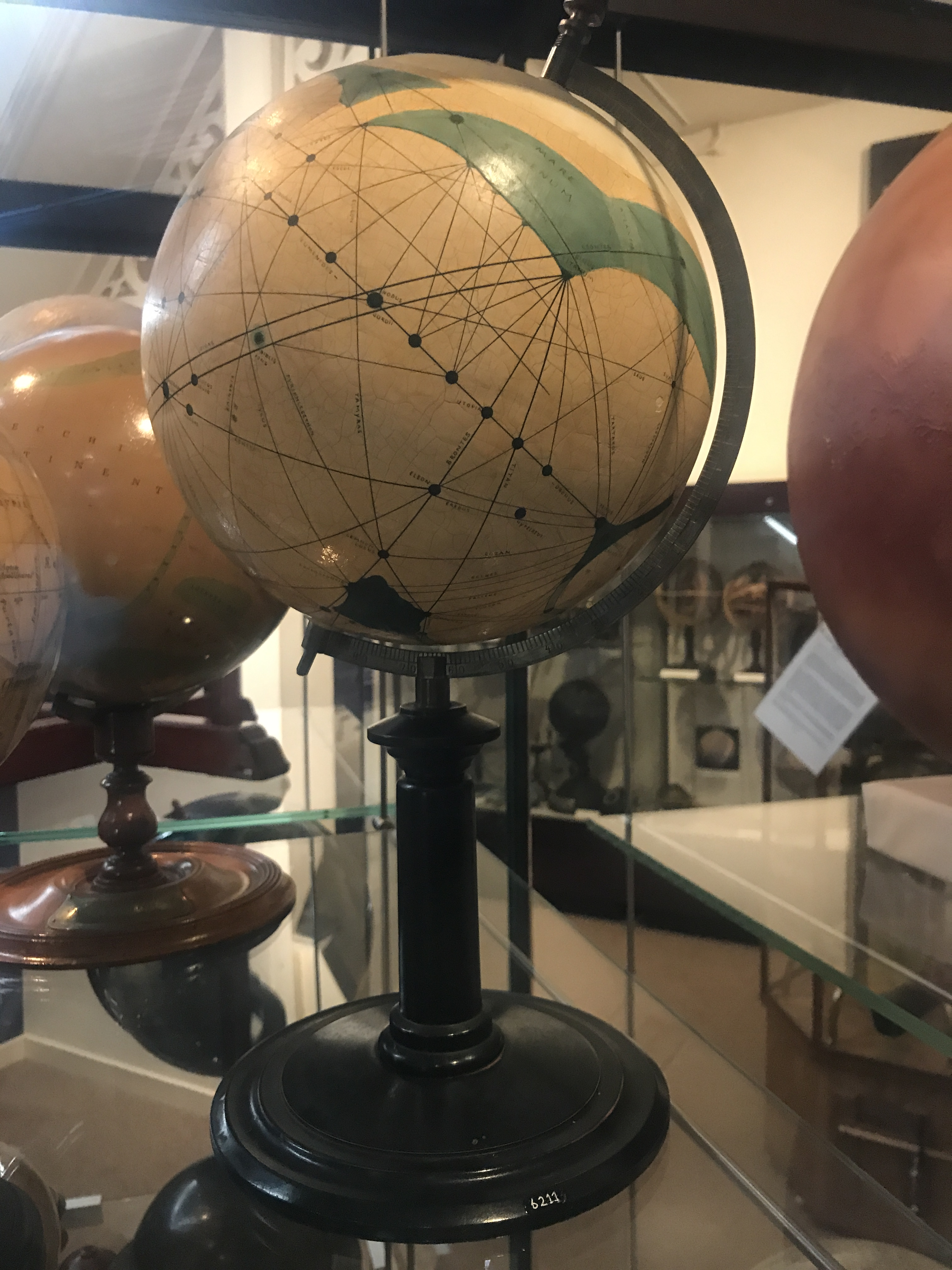
- Hand-painted globe of Mars by Ingeborg Brun
- Born: Emmy Ingeborg Brun; 27 June 1872; Copenhagen, Denmark
- Died: May 19, 1929 (aged 56); Svendborg, Denmark
- Other name: Ingeborg Brun
- Occupations: astronomer, globe maker

Ingeborg Brun (27 June 1872 – 19 May 1929) was a Danish amateur astronomer, socialist and writer and best known for her hand-painted globes depicting the surface of Mars.

Although she made only a small number of them, Brun's museum-owned globes (called manuscript globes) "deserve special mention for their beauty and detailed rendering of the supposed Martian canals."

== Early life ==
Emmy Ingeborg Brun, more commonly known as Ingeborg Brun, was born in 1872 in Copenhagen, Denmark. She was the daughter of a court hunter Alexander Brun and his third wife Louise (born Wolff) and had two older brothers, Carl Frederik Emil Brun (born 1865) and Alf Harald Brun (born 1866).

=== Institutionalization ===
Brun spent nine years in a mental institution. According to her diary, her brother Alf had her put there and only after nine years did she succeed, with the help of friends, to attest that she was not insane and able to return to society in 1910. However, by that time, at about 38 years of age, she was physically ill and remained confined to her bed for the rest of her life.

=== Mars fascination ===
Although Brun lacked formal astronomical training and did not have a telescope or binoculars, she was an enthusiastic researcher. By extensively reading the works of contemporary astronomers, she taught herself about the skies and philosophy. Of special note were the books about Mars by American Percival Lowell (1855–1916) and the Martian observations of Italian Giovanni Schiaparelli, as well as the socialist ideas of American political scientist Henry George, who hoped that Mars could be the ideal place for a new, free society.

Milanese astronomer Schiaparelli first observed a network of dark lines on the surface of Mars in 1855 and had suggested that they were artificial canals, which turned out to be optical illusions. When he published his findings, along with the first detailed modern map of Mars, he named them "canali," and suggested that they were built by a socialist regime as a planet-wide system without any national boundaries. His conjectures were supported by Lowell's observations of the planet from his observatory (now Lowell Observatory) in Flagstaff, Arizona. Lowell claimed the canals showed evidence of life on the planet and Brun became intrigued by these “canals.”

== Manuscript globes ==
From 1905 to 1909, apparently during her institutionalization, Brun adapted Lowell's maps into "manuscript globes," painting Martian worlds over existing globes of Earth. Brun was intrigued by Lowell’s vision of the planet’s infrastructure, which she thought was evidence of a radically different cooperative Martian social order. Therefore, her globes overlay Lowell's territorial observations with Schiaperelli's nomenclature for the planet's features, most of which are no longer used.

=== Construction ===
Each globe is unique. Brun’s typical globe was made using paper mache to cover the preprinted surface of a globe, which she then hand-colored and inked. As she painted the planet's features, carefully transcribing Lowell's maps, she incorporated imagined oases and areas of seasonal vegetation named and connected by a series of canals. The wood or bronze base of some globes were inscribed with text similar to: Mars efter Lowekks Glober 1894-1914. One had a diameter of 20 cm (about 7.8 inches), height of 38–40 cm (about 15 inches). Another had a diameter of 14 cm (5 1/2 inches), and a height of 29 cm (about 11 inches).

Notably, Brun's Mars globes were built with the south pole at the top of the axis and the north pole at the bottom. This inverted view corresponds to the way Mars was viewed from Earth's northern hemisphere using an astronomical telescope.

Brun donated globes to several astronomers, astronomical observatories and institutions. She sent one to Lowell himself in 1915, who replied warmly that it was "a capital piece of work," although, he said, it was initially stopped at customs because the officers there mistook it for a bomb.

=== Current owners ===
Fewer than ten of Brun's globes have been identified. One example appeared at auction at Bonham's New York on 5 December 2012, selling for $50,000 (Lot 129). Brun's globes have been located at these institutions:

- National Maritime Museum, Greenwich, England
- National Museum of Scotland, Edinburgh
- Whipple Museum of the History of Science, Cambridge, England
- Museo Specula Vaticana, the Vatican (Castel Gandolfo), Italy
- Museum Observatoire Camille Flammarion, Juvisy-sur-Orge, France
- Ole Rømer Museum, Taastrup, Denmark
- Lund Observatory, Sweden
- (a possible example) in the Randy and Yulia Liebermann Lunar and Planetary Exploration Collection

== Writings ==
- Brun's diary is titled, "Ben Oni. Leaves of Emmy Hanum's Diary."
- In 1923, her prayer script (Et Bønskrift) was printed in Svendborg and is now held at the Danish Royal Library in Copenhagen.
- In 1929, she published Testimony from Two Generations, which is also held at the Danish Royal Library.

== Death ==
Brun remained bedridden until her death on 19 May 1929 at her house at Svendborg.

== External sources ==
- George Basalla, Civilized Life in the Universe: Scientists on Intelligent Extraterrestrials (Oxford: Oxford University Press, 2006), pp. 86–87
- Lowell published three books that intrigued Brun, Mars (1895), Mars and its Canals (1906) and Mars as the Abode of Life (1908).
- Census and personal data about Brun: https://www.ukp.dk/TNG/getperson.php?personID=I3557&tree=SL
- Image: Danish Royal Library Portrait Collection: http://www5.kb.dk/images/billed/2010/okt/billeder/object449280/da/
