= Hilmar Duerbeck =

German astronomer

Hilmar Willi Duerbeck (19 July 1948 – 5 January 2012) was a German astronomer.

He studied at the University of Bonn and worked at the Observatory Hoher List. He was married to astronomer Waltraut Seitter.
