= Ruth Agnes Daly =

American astrophysicist

Ruth Agnes Daly (born 1958) is an American astrophysicist.

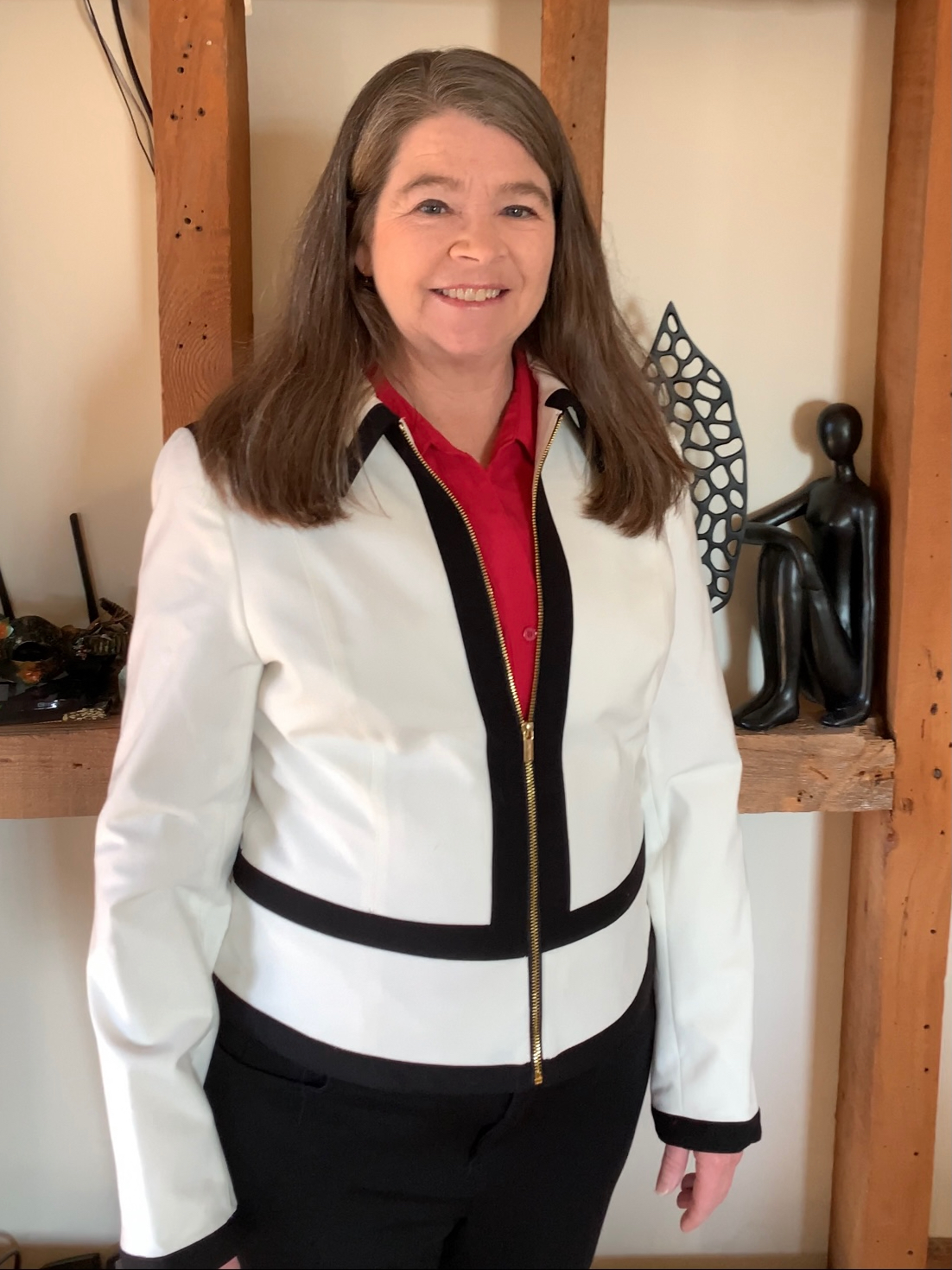
Ruth Agnes Daly

== Education and career ==
Daly obtained a B.A. in Psychology and English from Boston College in 1979 and then switched fields to study Astronomy and Physics at Boston University. She obtained her master's degree and Ph.D. in Astronomy and Physics from Boston University in 1984 and 1987, respectively, working with thesis advisers Alan P. Marscher and Sheldon Glashow. She was a NATO-NSF Postdoctoral Fellow at the Institute of Astronomy in Cambridge from 1987 to 1988, sponsored by Sir Martin Rees. She joined the Physics Department at Princeton University in 1988, first as a Research Associate (1988 to 1989), then as an Instructor (1989 to 1990), and finally as an Assistant Professor (1990 to 1998). She joined the faculty at Bucknell University in 1998, and the faculty at the Pennsylvania State University at the Berks Campus in 1999. She is currently a professor of physics at Penn State University, Berks campus.

== Research ==
Daly conducts theoretical, phenomenological, and observational work in astrophysics. Her PhD thesis title was “The Origin of the Diffuse X-Ray Background and the Formation of Galaxies and Voids” under the supervision of Dr. Sheldon L. Glashow and Dr. Alan P. Marscher. Her main areas of study are cosmology and extragalactic astrophysics. She is most well known for her work on the expansion and acceleration histories of the universe, the use of these histories to determine the contents of the universe, and studies of the properties of supermassive black holes, e.g., as summarized. Non-specialists interested in this work can read about it in the popular literature, such as Sky & Telescope. Some key results, obtained in collaboration with Professor Stanislav George Djorgovski, are that the expansion and acceleration histories of the universe can be determined in a model-independent manner, which does not require that a theory of gravity be specified and does not depend upon the contents of the universe. The results indicate that the universe is accelerating at the present time, and was decelerating in the recent past. Daly has also shown that the properties of outflows from the vicinity of a supermassive black hole can be used to estimate the spin of the black hole. Her ongoing research into the acceleration of the universe and the properties of supermassive black holes is discussed in detail in her publications, linked at her website.

== Recognition ==
Daly was named a Fellow of the American Physical Society (APS) in 2020, after a nomination from the APS Division of Astrophysics, "for studies of radio properties in supermassive black holes, leading to their use as cosmic rulers, and providing early evidence of their role in cosmic acceleration, and insight into the spin properties of the supermassive black holes that power the outflows". She was awarded the Penn State Berks Outstanding Researcher Award in 2006, the NSF National Young Investigator Award (1993 - 2002).

== Affiliations ==
- American Physical Society
- American Astronomical Society
- International Astronomical Union
