= Leah Morabito =

Italian and American radio astronomer

Leah K. Morabito is an Italian and American radio astronomer who uses her observations of supermassive black holes and active galactic nuclei to understand their effects on galaxy formation and evolution. She works in the UK as a research professor and UKRI Future Leaders Fellow in the Department of Physics at Durham University.

== Education and career ==
Morabito has a double baccalaureate in physics and astrophysics from the University of Michigan, where she graduated in 2005 with the support of a military scholarship. From 2005 to 2011 she was an officer in the United States Air Force, working as an air battle manager and achieving the rank of captain. Overlapping with her military service, she continued her studies in astronomy at the University of Oklahoma, and received a master's degree there in 2012. Next, she traveled to the Netherlands for doctoral study at Leiden University, where she completed her Ph.D. in 2016. Her doctoral dissertation, Radio galaxies at low frequencies: high spatial and spectral resolution studies with LOFAR, was jointly promoted by Huub J. A. Röttgering and George K. Miley.

From 2016 to 2019 she was a Hintze Fellow and postdoctoral researcher at the University of Oxford. She joined Durham University in 2019, as an assistant professor. In 2020 she was named as a UKRI Future Leaders Fellow. She was promoted to associate professor in 2022 and to full professor in 2024.

== Recognition ==
Morabito was the 2024 winner of the Fowler Award for early achievement in astronomy of the Royal Astronomical Society, recognizing her research on high-definition imaging with the Low-Frequency Array (LOFAR) and her work on the development of the Square Kilometre Array Observatory (SKAO).
