= Astronomy education =

Astronomy education or astronomy education research (AER) refers both to the methods currently used to teach the science of astronomy and to an area of discipline-based education research that seeks to improve those methods. Specifically, AER includes systematic techniques honed in science and physics education to understand what and how students learn about astronomy and determine how teachers can create more effective learning environments.

Education is important to astronomy as it impacts both the recruitment of future astronomers and the appreciation of astronomy by citizens and politicians who support astronomical research. Astronomy has been taught throughout much of recorded human history, and has practical application in timekeeping and navigation. Teaching astronomy contributes to an understanding of physics and the origin of the world around us, a shared cultural background, and a sense of wonder and exploration. It includes education of the general public through planetariums, books, and instructive presentations, plus programs and tools for amateur astronomy, and University-level degree programs for professional astronomers. Astronomy organizations provide educational functions and societies in about 100 nation states around the world.

In schools, particularly at the collegiate level, astronomy is aligned with physics and the two are often combined to form a Department of Physics and Astronomy. Some parts of astronomy education overlap with physics education, however, astronomy education has its own arenas, practitioners, journals, and research. This can be demonstrated in the identified 20-year lag between the emergence of AER and physics education research. The body of research in this field are available through electronic sources such as the Searchable Annotated Bibliography of Education Research (SABER) and the American Astronomical Society's database of the contents of their journal "Astronomy Education Review" (see link below).

The National Aeronautics and Space Administration (NASA) has also created a Center for Astronomy Education, a program designed to support the professional development of astronomy instructors through the NASA JPL Exoplanet Exploration Public Engagement Program and the Spitzer Education and Outreach Program.

== International perspectives ==
The International Astronomical Union (IAU) established the Office of Astronomy for Education (OAE) in 2019 to support astronomy teaching in primary and secondary schools. Based in Heidelberg, Germany, the office works through National Astronomy Education Coordinators and a network of centers and nodes. Its activities include teacher professional development, educational resource development and support for astronomy in school curricula.

=== India ===
In India, the OAE center is hosted by the Homi Bhabha Centre for Science Education of the Tata Institute of Fundamental Research, in association with the Inter-University Centre for Astronomy and Astrophysics. Its work includes developing astronomy teaching methods, assessment tools and teacher-training materials for middle and secondary education. It also develops model curricula adapted to regional and cultural contexts, with particular attention to language inclusivity.

=== Japan ===
In Japan, astronomy is taught within science at elementary and lower-secondary levels rather than as a separate subject. Topics progress from observations of the Sun, Moon and constellations to celestial motions, eclipses and the Solar System. At upper-secondary level, astronomy is taught mainly within earth science, with gravitation and Kepler’s laws also covered in physics. Science centers, planetariums, public observatories and amateur astronomy organizations provide additional learning opportunities outside schools.

=== South Korea ===
In South Korea, astronomy is a part of the national science curriculum. A review of extant curricula from 1945 to 2023 indicates that celestial motions and the physical properties of stars remained recurring topics, while other content changed in response to social needs and astronomical discoveries. The 2022 curriculum revision placed greater emphasis on inquiry activities using digital tools and removed some content, including coordinate systems. The abovementioned review also identified limited treatment of astronomy in relation to education for sustainable development.

== See also ==
- European Association for Astronomy Education
- Universe Awareness
- Astronomical Society of the Pacific
