= Necia Apfel =

American astronomer

- Born: Necia Halpern; July 31, 1930 (age 96)
- Education: Tufts University, Northwestern University
- Occupations: Astronomer, author, educator
- Spouse: Donald A. Apfel (m. 1952)
- Children: 2

Necia Apfel (née Halpern; born July 31, 1930) is an American astronomer, author and educator.

== Biography ==
Necia Halpern graduated magna cum laude from Tufts University and did graduate work at Radcliffe College and Northwestern University. She has lectured about astronomy to children in the Chicago area and taught courses on the teaching of astronomy at National-Louis University in Evanston, Illinois.. She was a Research Assistant at the Lindheimer Astrophysical Research Center in Evanston, IL as well.

She married Donald A. Apfel on September 7, 1952. They had two children. He predeceased her. She lives in Highland Park, Illinois. After retiring, she was a volunteer and past President of the Friends of the Highland Park Public Library. She is the author of two college textbooks on astronomy and ten books for children.

== Bibliography ==
- It's All Elementary: From Atoms to the Quantum World of Quarks, Leptons and Gluons, Lothrop, Lee & Shepard Books (c1985), ISBN 0-688-04092-6
- Nebulae: The Birth and Death of Stars, Lothrop, Lee & Shepard Books (c1988) ISBN 0-688-07228-3
- Voyager to the Planets, Clarion Books (c1991), ISBN 0-395-55209-5
- It's All Relative: Einstein's Theory of Relativity, with diagrams by Yukio Kondo, Lothrop, Lee & Shepard Books (c1981), ISBN 0-688-41981-X
- Astronomy and Planetology: Projects for Young Scientists, F. Watts (1983)
- Arco Astronomy Projects for Young Scientists, Arco Pub (c1984), ISBN 0-668-06006-9
- Architecture of the Universe, with J. Allen Hynek, Benjamin/Cummings (c1979), ISBN 0-8053-4747-X
- Orion, The Hunter, Clarion Books (c1995), ISBN 0-395-68962-7
- Space Station (First Books), F. Watts (1987), ISBN 0-531-10394-3
- Moon and Its Exploration: A First Book (First Books), F. Watts (1982), ISBN 0-531-04385-1
- Stars and Galaxies. (1982) ISBN 0-531-04389-4
