= Magdalena Zeger =

Astrologer and calendar maker (1490/1–1568)

Magdalena Zeger (1490/1–1568) was an astrologer and calendar maker working in Germany and Denmark. She produced yearly calendars with astrological prognostications in the 1560s, in an early instance of a woman making independent astronomical publications.

Zeger was married to a physician and fellow astrologer, Thomas Zeger, who held several professorships at the Universities of Marburg and Copenhagen and worked as personal physician to Henry V, Duke of Mecklenburg and King Christian III of Denmark. He died in 1544, after which Magdalena at some point moved to Kolding, Denmark. They had a son, Thomas.

She produced almanacs with prognostications for several years, printed in Hamburg, of which copies from 1561 and 1563 survive.

She died in Kolding on 16 January 1568.
