= Universe Awareness =

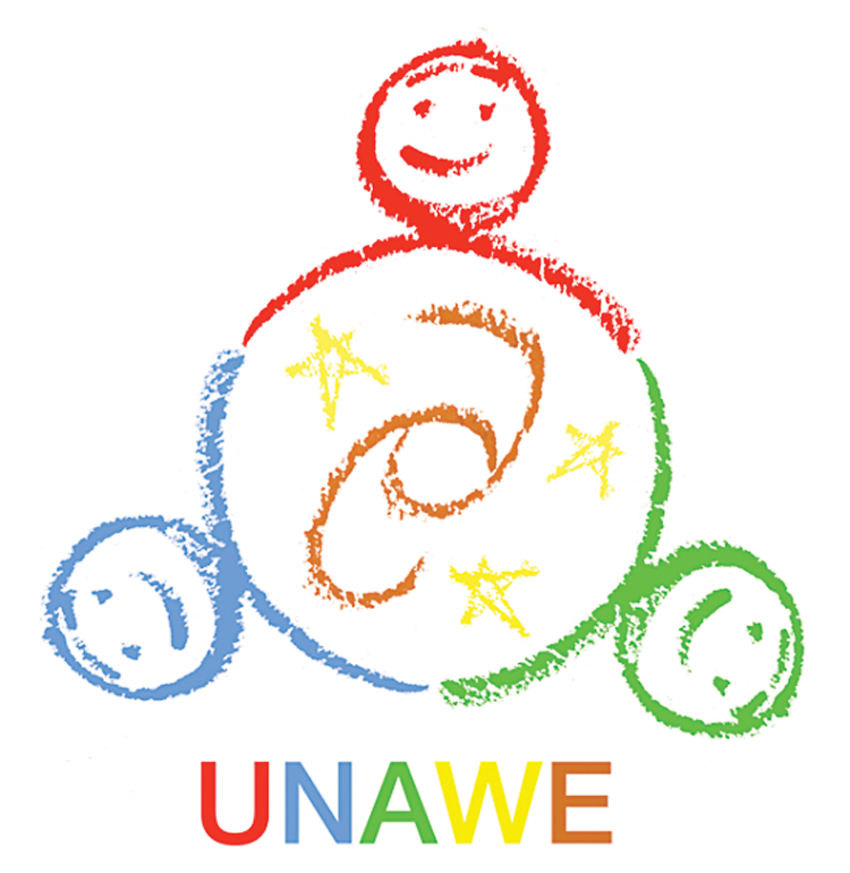
Logo

Universe Awareness or (UNAWE) is an international programme that aim to expose very young children in under-privileged environments to astronomy.

== History ==
=== Inception ===
In 2004, Leiden University professor George K. Miley first began exploring the idea of setting up an astronomy programme to educate and inspire young children, especially those from underprivileged backgrounds. He had been awarded an Academy Professorship by the Royal Netherlands Academy of Arts and Sciences and decided to use part of the associated funding to explore the feasibility of setting up such a programme. With considerable support and encouragement from Claus Madsen at ESO, a successful workshop was held in Germany and it was agreed that the programme was worth pursuing. Universe Awareness (UNAWE) was born.

Shortly afterwards, Carolina Ödman was appointed as the first UNAWE International Project Manager. In 2006, thanks to a grant provided by the Netherlands Minister of Education Culture and Science, Ms. van der Hoeven, the UNAWE International Office was founded at Leiden Observatory, the Netherlands. With the help of Sarah Levin as Media Coordinator, Ödman built UNAWE into a thriving global project, with a network of about 400 experts from 40 countries.

=== Reach ===
UNAWE became a Cornerstone project of the successful UN-ratified IAU/UNESCO International Year of Astronomy in 2009 (IYA2009). During IYA2009, thousands of UNAWE activities were organised in more than 45 countries. For example, in Venezuela, 43 teacher training sessions reached more than 1500 teachers and well over 60 000 children.

2010 saw many changes for UNAWE. Firstly, Ödman left her coordinating role with UNAWE to join the African Institute for Mathematical Sciences Next Einstein Initiative, handing over the reins to the former Global Coordinator for IYA2009, Pedro Russo. Later that year, the European Union awarded a grant of 1.9 million euros to fund a 3-year project called European Universe Awareness (EU-UNAWE), which builds on the work of Universe Awareness (UNAWE). With this grant, EU-UNAWE is now being further developed in six selected countries: the Netherlands, Germany, Spain, Italy, the United Kingdom and South Africa.

EU-UNAWE is endorsed by the International Astronomical Union (IAU) and it is now an integral part of the IAU Strategic Plan 2010–2020, which is called Astronomy for the Developing World. This is an ambitious blueprint that aims to use astronomy to foster education and provide skills and competencies in science and technology throughout the world, particularly in developing countries.

== See also ==
- Astronomy education
