= Waltraut Seitter =

German astronomer

- Born: Waltraut Carola Seitter; 13 January 1930; Zwickau, Germany
- Died: 15 November 2007 (aged 77); Schalkenmehren, Germany
- Education: Smith College
- Occupation: Astronomer
- Spouse: Hilmar Duerbeck

Waltraut Seitter (13 January 1930 – 15 November 2007) was a German astronomer and became the first woman in Germany to hold an astronomy chair.

== Life and work ==
Waltraut Carola Seitter was born in Zwickau in 1930, where her father worked as an engineer with the Horch automobile company. She went to school in Cologne, where she finished high school in 1949 (after jobs as tramway ticket collector, refugee aide and draftswoman), and entered the university to study physics, mathematics, chemistry and astronomy. She continued her studies at Smith College in Northampton, Massachusetts with a grant from the Fulbright Program, obtained her Master of Arts in physics in 1955, and became an astronomy instructor. From 1958 to 1962 she worked at Hoher List Observatory of Bonn University, obtained her Ph.D., and held the positions of assistant, observer and adjunct professor at Bonn University. In 1967, she was a guest professor of the American Astronomical Society at Vanderbilt University in Nashville, Tennessee, afterward professor at Smith College (since 1973, Eliza Appleton Haven Professor for Astronomy). In 1975, she was called to the chair of astronomy at Muenster University in Germany (the first woman in Germany to hold an astronomy chair), and became director of the astronomical institute up to her retirement in 1995.

When in Bonn, she worked on problems of stellar statistics and on spectral classification of stars, publishing the Bonn Spectral Atlas (in two volumes). In Muenster, with a dedicated team of young researchers, she organized the Muenster Redshift Project (MRSP), a method to derive redshifts from UK Schmidt telescope objective prism plates, and the Muenster Red Sky Survey, a galaxy catalog of the southern hemisphere, based on ESO Schmidt direct red plates. With the MRSP data, the first indications of the action of the cosmological constant were found, shortly before major supernova searches established its existence with certainty.

During most of her career, she also did research on novae and related eruptive stars.

Exhibits arranged by her include Women in Astronomy, and Science in Exile (Smith College), as well as Kepler and his times (Muenster 1980). She also organized several international astronomical meetings.

Since 1975, Waltraut Seitter was married to Hilmar Duerbeck, a fellow astronomer.

The asteroid (4893) Seitter, discovered in 1986, is named after her.

== Selected publications ==
- Two-color diagrams and questions of stellar statistics, 1962
- The spectrum of the Nova Herculis in 1963: After objective prism recordings at the Observatory Hoher List, 1963
- Bonner Spectral-Atlas I, II, 1970, 1975
- Large-scale structures in the universe: observational and analytical methods, 1988
- Cosmological aspects of X-ray clusters of galaxies, 1994
