= Nikole Lewis =

American astrophysicist

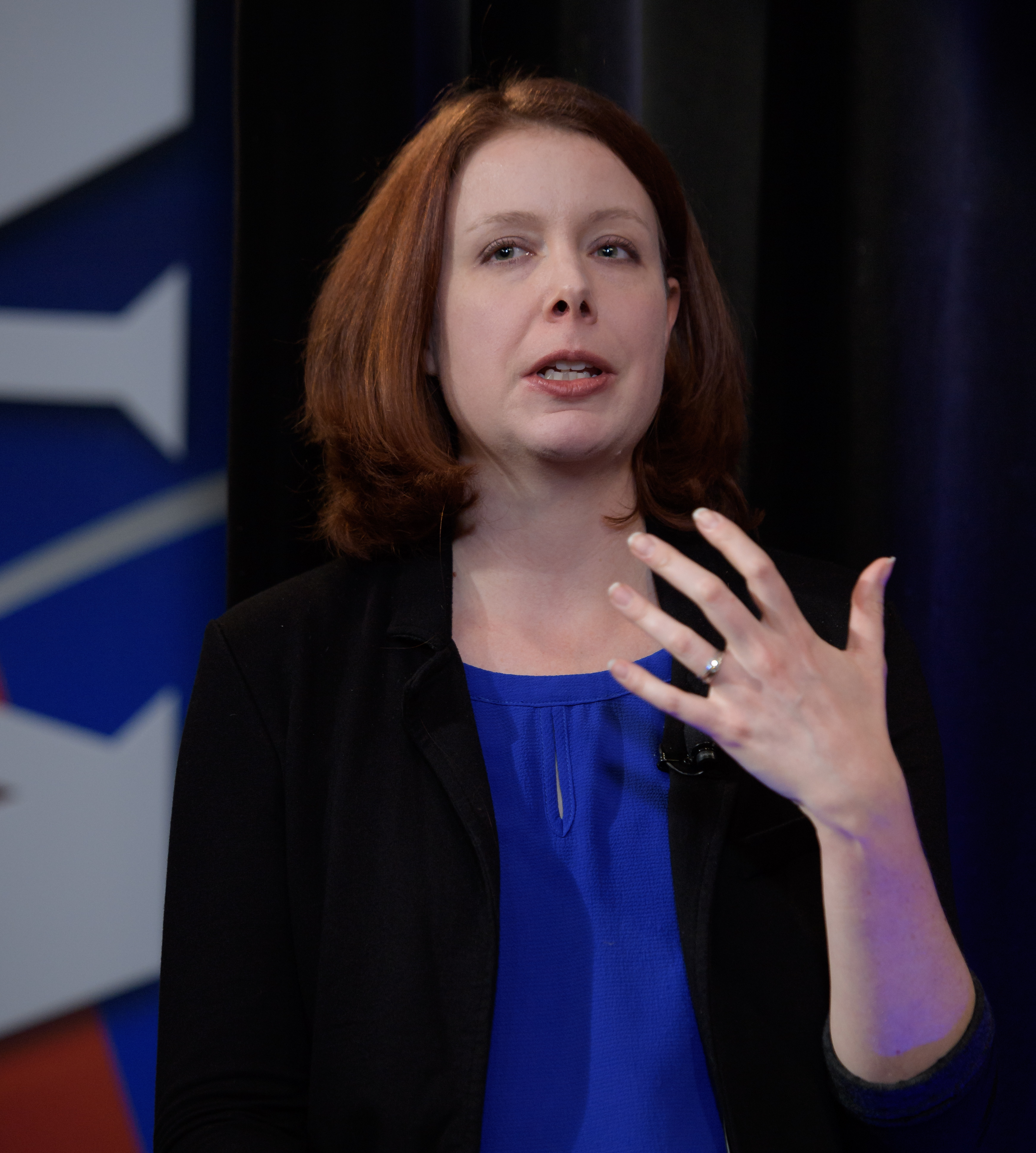
- Lewis in 2017
- Education: University of Arizona (Ph.D. 2012); Boston University (M.A. 2004); Worcester Polytechnic Institute (B.S. 2002)
- Known for: Exoplanet detection
- Scientific career
- Fields: Astrophysics; Exoplanets
- Workplaces: Cornell University; Carl Sagan Institute

Nikole Lewis is an astrophysicist and an associate professor of Astronomy at Cornell University.

== Career ==
Her major research interests include observational and theoretical techniques for probing exoplanet atmospheres. She co-led a spectroscopic survey of the TRAPPIST-1 system in 2018 using the Hubble Space Telescope, which was the first such survey for Earth-sized exoplanets. She also took part in the original announcement of the TRAPPIST-1 system in 2017 by helping describe the system and the importance of detecting atmospheres to search for biosignatures.
