= Grant Tremblay =

American astrophysicist (born 1984)

Grant R. Tremblay
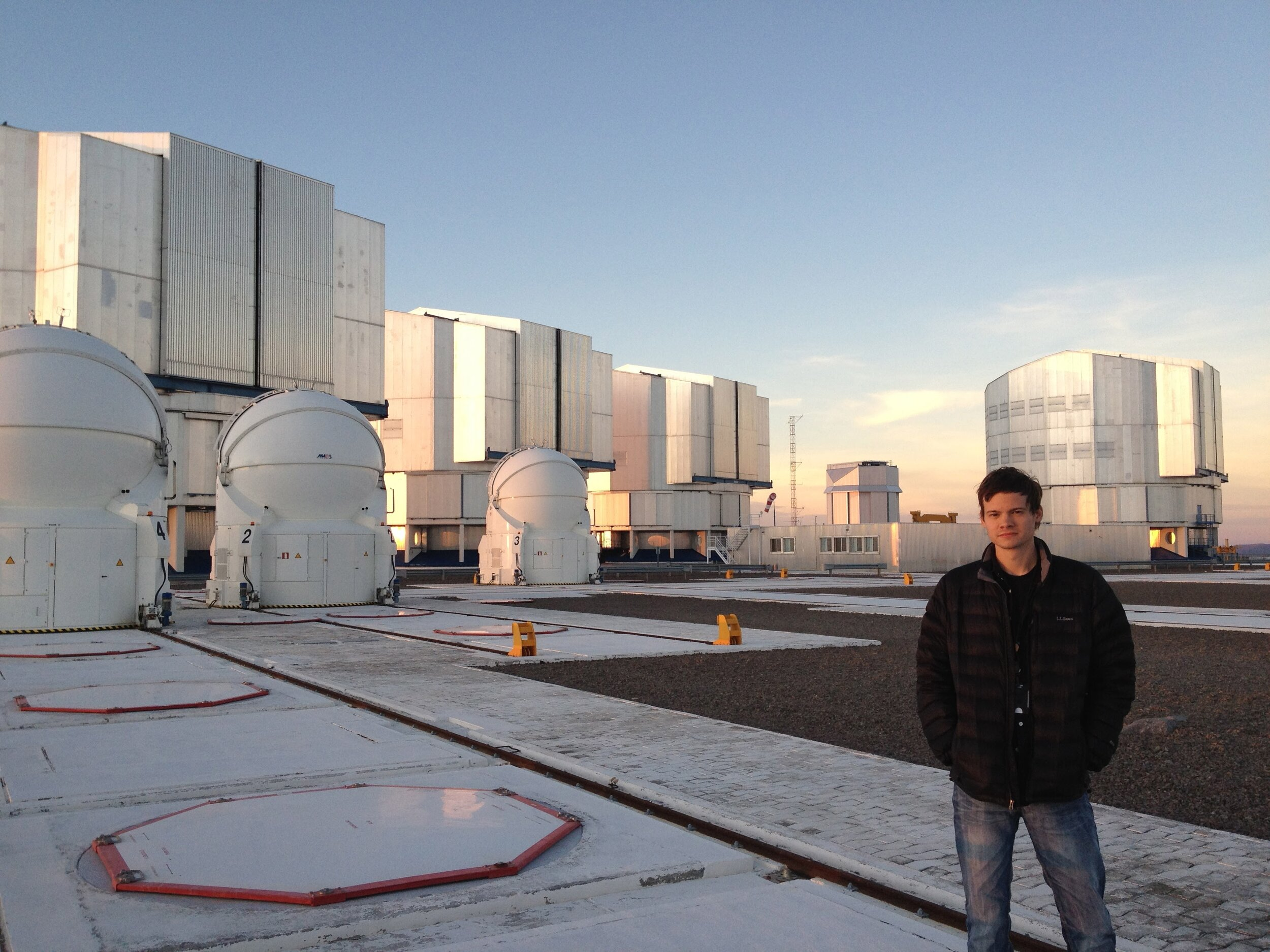
- Born: March 13, 1984 (age 41)
- Education: Ph.D. Astrophysics, Rochester Institute of Technology
- Occupation: Astrophysicist
- Employer: Harvard-Smithsonian Center for Astrophysics
- Scientific career
- Institutions: University of Rochester; Johns Hopkins University; Yale University
- Website: www.granttremblay.com

Grant Tremblay (born March 13, 1984) is an American astrophysicist notable for research on supermassive black holes, science communication, and public advocacy for large space telescopes. He is currently an Astrophysicist and Director of External Relations at the Harvard-Smithsonian Center for Astrophysics, and was formerly a NASA Einstein Fellow at Yale University, a Fellow at the European Southern Observatory (ESO), and an Astronomer at ESO's Very Large Telescope (VLT).

As of 2022, Tremblay is vice president of the American Astronomical Society, a member of the NASA Astrophysics Advisory Committee, and chair of the executive committee for NASA's Physics of the Cosmos Program Analysis Group (PhysPAG). He is an author on more than 100 peer-reviewed publications on star formation and supermassive black holes as well as books for the general public including Light from the Void: Twenty Years of Discovery with NASA's Chandra X-ray Observatory and What do Black Holes Eat for Dinner?.

Tremblay has appeared as a main cast member on various science documentary series including How the Universe Works, and has given numerous presentations at universities, schools, and science festivals. He is head of the Lynx X-ray Observatory Science Study Office, and is a public advocate for a new fleet of Great Observatories following release of the 2020 Decadal Survey in Astronomy and Astrophysics. In 2020 he founded the New Great Observatories community coalition to advocate for that fleet amongst stakeholders, U.S. policymakers, and the global public.

== Early life and education ==
Tremblay was born in Brunswick, Maine, and graduated from Brunswick High School in 2002. His interest in astronomy and astrophysics was triggered by the 1994 Comet Shoemaker–Levy 9 impact of Jupiter, and by using a small telescope in his backyard while growing up in Maine. He obtained his Bachelor of Science degree in Physics and Astronomy from the University of Rochester in 2006, and received his Doctor of Philosophy (Ph.D.) in Astrophysics from the Rochester Institute of Technology in 2011, where his thesis work was conducted in collaboration with the Johns Hopkins University and the Space Telescope Science Institute. His Doctoral advisors were Stefi Baum and Christopher O'Dea, and his Ph.D. Thesis was titled "Feedback Regulated Star Formation in Cool Core Clusters of Galaxies".

== Career and research ==
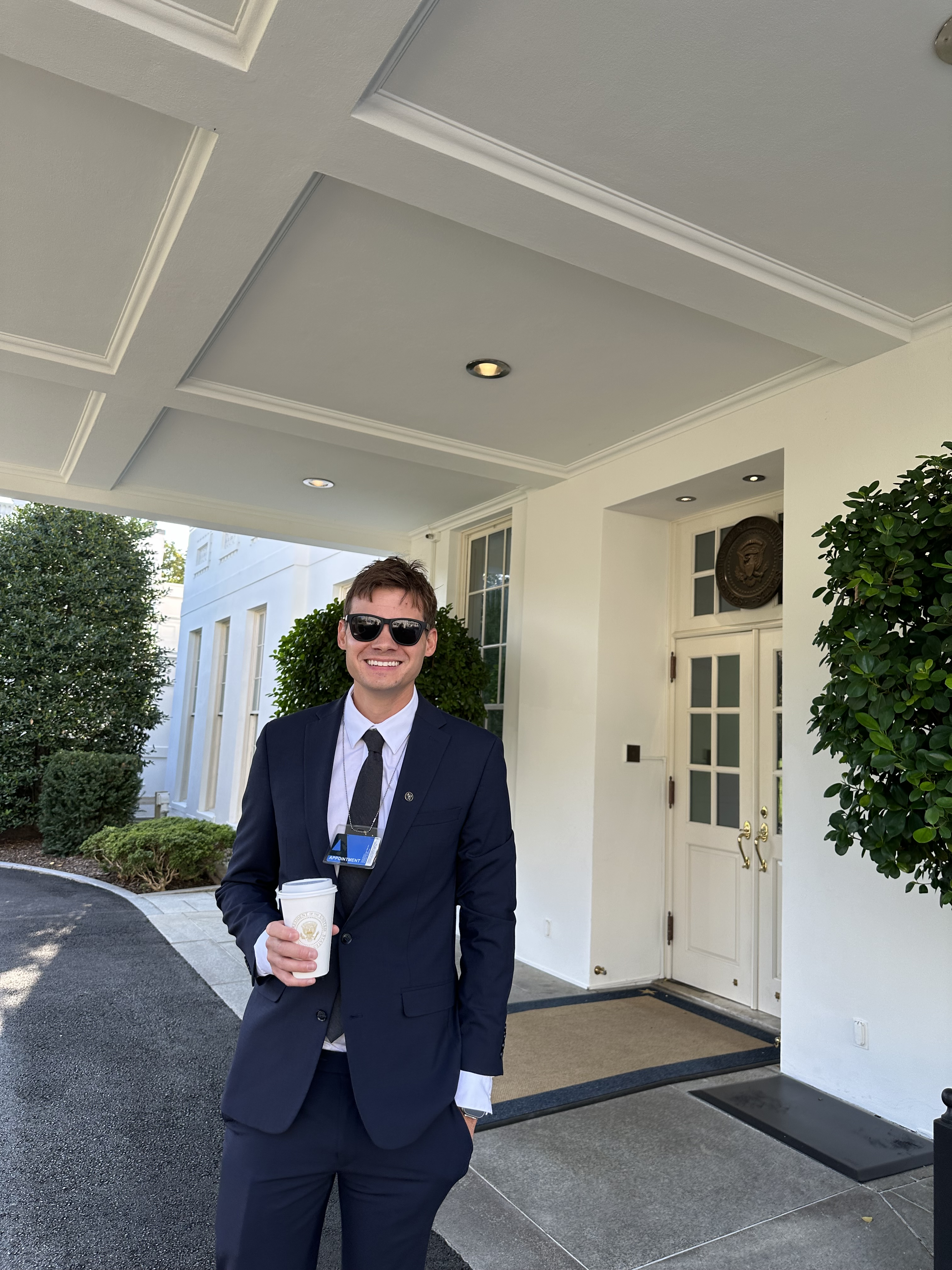
Tremblay standing outside of the West Wing of the White House, September 2024

Following receipt of his doctoral degree, Tremblay was a European Southern Observatory (ESO) Fellow in Garching, Germany and an Astronomer at ESO's Paranal Observatory in the Atacama Desert of Chile (from 2011 through 2014). He was then a NASA Einstein Fellow at Yale University, working with Meg Urry.

In 2016, Tremblay and collaborators published a paper in the journal Nature reporting Atacama Large Millimeter Array (ALMA) observations of cold molecular gas clouds falling toward a supermassive black hole in the brightest cluster galaxy of Abell 2597, a well known cool core cluster of galaxies. The result received widespread media coverage. Tremblay was also involved in the discovery of a possible runaway black hole as well as the oldest black hole ever discovered.

As of 2023, Tremblay works at the Harvard-Smithsonian Center for Astrophysics, where he is the head of the Lynx X-ray Observatory science support office and supports flight operations for the Chandra X-ray Observatory. In 2021, he was elected vice president of the American Astronomical Society (for a 2022–2025 term). He is also a special government employee advising NASA's Astrophysics Division as part of the NASA Astrophysics Advisory Committee.

=== Selected publications ===
Tremblay is an author on more than 100 peer-reviewed publications in academic journals such as The Astrophysical Journal, Monthly Notices of the Royal Astronomical Society, Nature, and Astronomy & Astrophysics, and he frequently collaborates with astronomers such as Françoise Combes, Andrew Fabian, and Megan Donahue.

Selected publications include:

- Grant Tremblay; J B Raymond Oonk; Françoise Combes; et al. (1 June 2016). "Cold, clumpy accretion onto an active supermassive black hole". Nature. 534 (7606): 218–221. arXiv:1606.02304. Bibcode:2016Natur.534..218T. doi:10.1038/NATURE17969. ISSN 1476-4687. PMID 27279215. Wikidata Q54525466.
- G. R. Tremblay; F. Combes; J. B. R. Oonk; et al. (17 September 2018). "A Galaxy-scale Fountain of Cold Molecular Gas Pumped by a Black Hole". The Astrophysical Journal. 865 (1): 13. arXiv:1808.00473. Bibcode:2018ApJ...865...13T. doi:10.3847/1538-4357/AAD6DD. ISSN 0004-637X. Wikidata Q57337395.
- G. R. Tremblay; C. P. O'Dea; S. A. Baum; et al. (29 June 2015). "Far-ultraviolet morphology of star-forming filaments in cool core brightest cluster galaxies". Monthly Notices of the Royal Astronomical Society. 451 (4): 3768–3800. Bibcode:2015MNRAS.451.3768T. doi:10.1093/MNRAS/STV1151. ISSN 0035-8711. Wikidata Q56914248.
- G. R. Tremblay; C. P. O’Dea; S. A. Baum; et al. (27 June 2012). "Residual cooling and persistent star formation amid active galactic nucleus feedback in Abell 2597". Monthly Notices of the Royal Astronomical Society. 424 (2): 1042–1060. arXiv:1205.2373. Bibcode:2012MNRAS.424.1042T. doi:10.1111/J.1365-2966.2012.21278.X. ISSN 0035-8711. Wikidata Q56914870.
- A. M. Price-Whelan; B. M. Sipőcz; H. M. Günther; et al. (23 August 2018). "The Astropy Project: Building an Open-science Project and Status of the v2.0 Core Package". The Astronomical Journal. 156 (3): 123. arXiv:1801.02634. Bibcode:2018AJ....156..123A. doi:10.3847/1538-3881/AABC4F. ISSN 0004-6256. Wikidata Q58831014.
- B. R. McNamara; H. R. Russell; P. E. J. Nulsen; et al. (25 March 2014). "A 10^10^ solar mass flow of molecular gas in the A1835 brightest cluster galaxy". The Astrophysical Journal. 785 (1): 44. arXiv:1309.0013. Bibcode:2014ApJ...785...44M. doi:10.1088/0004-637X/785/1/44. ISSN 0004-637X. Wikidata Q56914524.

=== Public engagement and advocacy ===
Tremblay is also involved in science communication and outreach. He is the author of two books for the general public (Light from the Void: Twenty Years of Discovery with NASA's Chandra X-ray Observatory and What do Black Holes Eat for Dinner?.), and has appeared as a cast member on various documentary series about space and the universe, including Discovery and Science Channel's How the Universe Works, Space's Deepest Secrets, and Nova.

== Personal life ==
Tremblay lives in Newton, Massachusetts, with his wife and three children.
