= V725 Sagittarii =

Star in the constellation Sagittarius

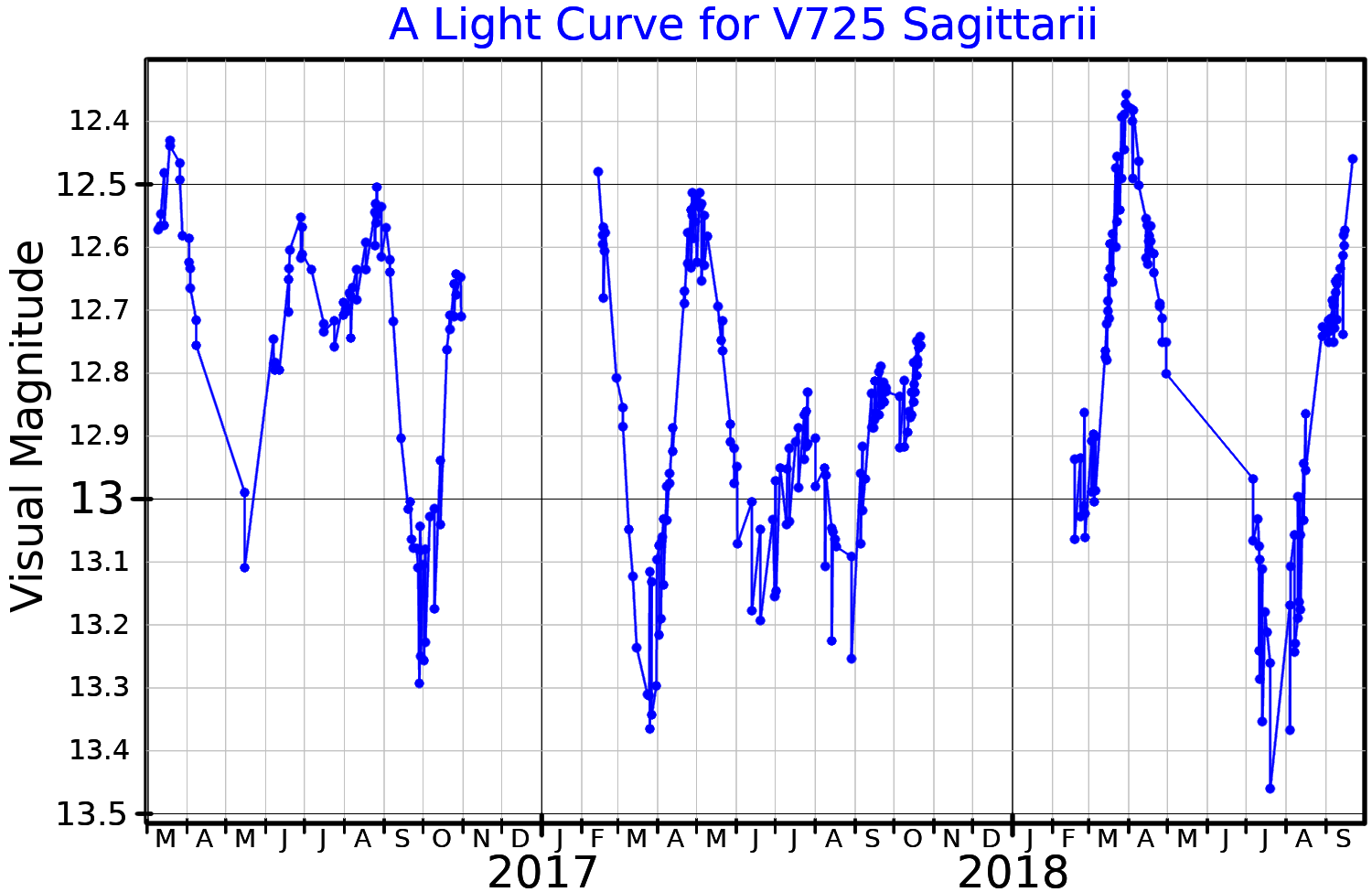
- A visual band light curve for V725 Sagittarii, adapted from Percy (2020)

Observation data Epoch J2000.0 Equinox J2000.0 (ICRS)
- Constellation: Sagittarius
- Right ascension: 18^{h} 11^{m} 59.43904^{s}
- Declination: −36° 06′ 40.3345″

Characteristics
- Spectral type: K4III (in 2009)
- Variable type: Unique

Astrometry
| Proper motion (μ) | RA: −1.111 mas/yr Dec.: −4.396 mas/yr |
| Parallax (π) | 0.1572±0.0433 mas |
| Distance | approx. 21,000 ly (approx. 6,000 pc) |
| Absolute magnitude (M_{V}) | −2.4 |

Details
| Mass | 4.25+0.67 −2.40 M_{☉} |
| Temperature | 4,413 K |
| Metallicity [Fe/H] | −0.001 dex |

Other designations
- V725 Sgr

Database references
| SIMBAD | data |

V725 Sagittarii is a variable star in the southern constellation of Sagittarius. As recently as a century ago, it was a Population II Cepheid; its transformation was documented by Henrietta Swope beginning in 1937, and is one of the most exciting and instructive events in variable-star astronomy. The star has varied between apparent visual magnitude 12.3 and 14.3.

In 1937, Henrietta Hill Swope announced her discovery that the star is a variable star, after she had analysed 40 years of Harvard College Observatory photographic plates. It was given its variable star designation in 1939. Prior to 1926, this star showed the appearance of being an irregular variable. It then became a Population II Cepheid showing a regular light curve with a period of 12 days. Monitoring showed a gradual increase to a 21 day period by 1935, but did not show a corresponding change in brightness. The star was mostly ignored until 1967–68 when it was seen to vary by 0.4 magnitude with a 50 day period. Steady observation thereafter showed that the star had experienced a thermal flash and performed a loop on the H-R diagram. It migrated from the asymptotic giant branch (AGB) to the Cepheid instability strip and then back to the AGB.

In 1973, the spectral class of V725 Sagittarii was estimated to be between F8 and G2 and similar to a type Ib supergiant. In 1994 it was observed to be G8 based on the spectral lines of metals and later than F8 based on the hydrogen lines. In 2006, it was reported that in 2000 V725 Sagittarii was an early M star with emission lines. In 2010, the spectral type was estimated from its colours and other properties to be K4III, although possibly late K.
