= Gerrit Verschuur =

American astronomer (born 1937)

Gerrit L. Verschuur
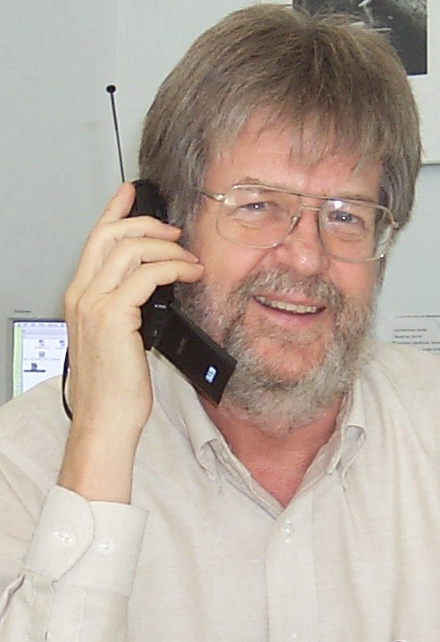
- Gerrit L. Verschuur in 1999
- Born: 1937 (age 88–89); Cape Town
- Education: Rhodes University; University of Manchester
- Scientific career
- Fields: Radio astronomy
- Workplaces: University of Memphis

Gerrit L. Verschuur (born in 1937 in Cape Town, South Africa) is an American scientist who is best known for his work in radio astronomy. Though a pioneer in that field, Verschuur is also an author (he has written about astronomy, natural disasters, and earth sciences), inventor, adjunct professor of physics for the University of Memphis, and Astronomer Emeritus - Arecibo Observatory and now semi-retired. He served for a time as the Chief Scientist for Translucent Technologies, LLC; a company which is based in Memphis, Tennessee.

In 1992 Verschuur became a resident of the City of Lakeland, which is located in Shelby County, Tennessee, northwest of Memphis. In 2001 Verschuur was elected, and served a four-year term as commissioner. In 2007 he was elected again and served for a total of 10 years. In Lakeland, Verschuur was also the President of the Garner Lake Association. Since 1986 he has been married to Dr. Joan Schmelz, a fellow scientist whose specialty is solar astronomy, specifically coronal loops. Verschuur has one son who lives in England.

During his years living beside the lake in Lakeland he made a fundamental discovery concerning the manner in which light interacts with a so-called Secchi Disk that is used to measure the transparency of lake and ocean waters. The disk had been invented in the mid-nineteenth century by a Jesuit priest (Angela Secchi) but no one before Verschuur had understand the optics underlying the measurement technique.

Verschuur has taught at the University of Manchester, Rhodes University, the universities of Colorado and Maryland, UCLA, and the University of California, Berkeley, among others. He has been an annual speaker at Mid-South Stargaze, "the annual amateur astronomers conference and star party held at Rainwater Observatory in French Camp, Mississippi." In 1971 Verschuur was hired as the first Director of Fiske Planetarium for the University of Colorado at Boulder, and in 1980 he worked with Dr. John C. Lilly.

In his primary field of study Verschuur "pioneered the measurement of the interstellar magnetic field using the 21-cm Zeeman effect technique." A thing which, according to Virginia Trimble, for the first time allowed astronomers to "measure magnetic strengths and their place-to-place variations with some confidence."

== Biography ==
Gerrit L. Verschuur was born in 1937 in Cape Town, South Africa, at the foot of Table Mountain. In 1936, his parents had emigrated from the Netherlands and settled in Cape Town. Two years after he was born—in 1939—his parents moved again, choosing a suburb of Cape Town named Lakeside. While he was living there, Verschuur attended Muizenberg Junior School. Then, when his parents moved to Port Elizabeth in 1950, he attended Grey Junior and subsequently Grey High School.

After graduation he began a six-year stint at Rhodes University in Grahamstown where he earned a BSc in 1957—Majors: Math, Physics, & Applied math; a BSc (Hons) of Physics in 1958; and a MSc degree of physics, in 1960.

In December 1960 he sailed for Southampton, England on Edinburgh Castle, a ship owned by the Union Castle Line. It was one of the last passenger mail boats to ply the SA-England route, but was sold for scrap in 1967.

He discovered the Local Leo Cold Clouds (LLCC), a cold, low-velocity interstellar cloud located in the Local Bubble.

== Current research ==
Verschuur is at the center of a recent debate over the age of the universe. He claimed that images from the Wilkinson Microwave Anisotropy Probe are not pictures of the universe in its early form, but rather hydrogen gas clouds in our own galaxy. If he is shown to be correct, much work relating to the Big Bang theory would be undermined.

On December 10, 2007, his work with respect to COBE, WMAP, and HI, was published in The Astrophysical Journal. However, Land and Slosar claimed that the data did not support the correlation claimed by Verschuur. He subsequently published 4 more papers on the subject backing up his claims.

His current research is conducted in partnership with Joan Schmelz, his wife, and elaborates on the exciting discovery they made that the so-called high-velocity clouds are produced by supernova events that occurred relatively close to the Sun, of order hundreds of light years distant, several hundred thousand years ago. They solved the 60 year-old mystery concerning the distance to certain clouds when they found that neutron stars (left over after the explosion) exists in spectroscopic binary systems, the primary example having been discovered by researchers in Belgium led by Ana Escorza who used GAIA data to identify likely neutron star candidates.

== Selected publications ==
=== Books ===
- The Invisible Universe: The Story of Radio Astronomy. Springer-Verlag, New York, 1974"Nominated for National book award – then disqualified because I was not a US citizen at the time."
- Galactic and Extragalactic Radio Astronomy. Springer-Verlag, New York, 1974. Co-edited with K.I. Kellerman
  ISBN 0-387-06504-0
- Cosmic Evolution: An Introduction to Astronomy. Houghton Mifflin, 1978. Co-Author with George B. Field and Cyril Ponnamperuma
  ISBN 0-395-25321-7
- Starscapes.Little Brown & Co., Boston, 1977ISBN 0-316-90030-3
- Cosmic Catastrophes. Addison Wesley Longman Publishing Co., 1978ISBN 0-201-08099-0
- Interstellar Matters: Essays on Curiosity and Astronomical Discovery. Springer-Verlag, 1989 ISBN 0-387-96814-8
- Hidden Attraction: The History and Mystery of Magnetism. Oxford University Press, 1996, (First Published 1993) ISBN 0-19-510655-5
- Impact!: The Threat of Comets and Asteroids. Oxford University Press, 1996 ISBN 0-19-510105-7
- The Invisible Universe: The Story of Radio Astronomy. Springer, 2nd. ed., 2007 ISBN 978-0-387-30816-6

=== Encyclopaedia articles ===
- "Interstellar Medium" Encyclopædia Britannica (15th edition) Volume I-J. pp 790–800, 1973
- "Interstellar Matter" Encyclopædia Britannica (Asian edition) 1986
- "Magnetic Fields and Galactic Structure." Reference Encyclopedia of Astronomy and Astrophysics. Ed. S. Maran, Van Nostrand Rheinhold, New York, 1992
