= Catharine Garmany =

Astronomer

Catharine D. Garmany
- Born: March 6, 1946 (age 80)
- Education: Bronx High School of ScienceIndiana University Bloomington (B.S., 1966; M.A., 1968); University of Virginia (PhD, 1971)
- Awards: Annie Jump Cannon Award in Astronomy (1976)
- Scientific career
- Fields: Astronomy
- Workplaces: Columbia University; University of Colorado

Catharine "Katy" D. Garmany (born March 6, 1946) is an astronomer with the National Optical Astronomy Observatory. She holds a B.S. (astrophysics), 1966 from Indiana University Bloomington; and a M.A. (astrophysics), 1968, and Ph.D. (astronomy), 1971, from the University of Virginia. Catharine's main areas of research are massive stars, evolution and formation; astronomical education.

Garmany served as board member of the Astronomical Society of the Pacific from 1998 to 2001, and then the vice president from 2001 to 2003. She is most recognized in association with her work on star formation. In 1976, Garmany received the Annie J. Cannon Award in Astronomy from the American Astronomical Society. From 1976 to 1984, Garmany was a research associate at the Joint Institute for Laboratory Astrophysics (JILA). Since 1981, Dr. Garmany has been a professor with in the Department of Astrophysical, Planetary, and Atmospheric Sciences at the University of Colorado. Garmany is the former chair of JILA and has experience teaching undergraduate, graduate, elementary, and general public audiences through her work with the University of Virginia, University of Colorado, and the Sommers-Bausch Observatory and Fiske Planetarium, on Colorado's campus. She is also a member of the International Astronomical Union, the American Astronomical Society, the Astronomical Society of the Pacific, and the International Planetarium Society.

== Research ==
Garmany's dissertation built upon three years of research on OB association III Cepheus at the Kitt Peak National Observatory in Arizona. Dr. Garmany and her research team study O- and B-type stars (see OB star), the largest and hottest stars of the galaxy. These stars form in OB associations, which defy typical gravitational bounds. Dr. Garmany was quoted, "an OB association is the closest thing to nothing that is still something." The significance of this research is associated with the star's potential to produce heavy elements when they explode. Garmany says that without OB stars, "there would be no planets like earth."

== Professional history ==
Starting 1971 and lasting through 1973, Garmany worked as a research associate for the department which awarded her doctorate degree, the University of Virginia's Department of Astronomy. Garmany also taught for 3 semesters at Sweet Briar College in Virginia. In 1975, Garmany moved to Colorado when she obtained an associate position researching with JILA and teaching general undergraduate and graduate level astronomy at the University of Colorado.

Garmany was selected as a fellow at the Center for Astrophysics and Space Astronomy (CASA) at the University of Colorado in 1985. Then beginning in 1990 she joined as a fellow of JILA of the University of Colorado, while maintaining her fellowship with CASA. She also led as director of the Sommers-Bausch Observatory and Fiske Planetarium and as a research professor at the University of Colorado. As director of the observatory and planetarium, Garmany was tasked with overseeing graduate students and maintaining the mission of the facility: to support instruction, provide public education through shows and displays, and to reach out to public school groups. "

From 2000 to 2003 Garmany taught as an associate professor at Columbia University and as director of the Astronomy Program with Biosphere 2, a science research facility located in Oracle, Arizona. S

Since 2004, she has worked as Sr. Science Education Specialist in the Office of Education and Public Outreach for the National Optical Astronomy Observatory.

== Personal history ==
Garmany was accepted to and attended the Bronx High School of Science. There Catharine met lifelong friends who would also pursue doctorates in chemistry and biology.

In 1970 she was married to George P. Garmany Jr., the two are now divorced. Garmany has two sons, Rick, born 1974, and Jeff, 1980.

== Recognition ==
Garmany received the Annie J. Cannon Award in astronomy in 1976. This award was distinguished to Garmany for "promise in her field," according to the American Association of University Women. After receiving this award, Garmany was offered an associate position for postdoctoral work at the University of Colorado with the Joint Institute for Laboratory Astrophysics, of which she would later become chair. Garmany articulated the impact of this award on her and for future female candidates, saying "Young women who enter science begin with low self-esteem. And the ones who leave science feel that they are not doing well enough, when, in fact, they are doing as well as the men."

She was elected a Legacy Fellow of the American Astronomical Society in 2020 and named an American Association for the Advancement of Science (AAAS) fellow in 2022.
