= SBO =

SBO may refer to:

- Jawa Pos TV, a television station in Surabaya, Indonesia formerly known as SBO TV
- SAP Business One, an enterprise resource planning software
- Senior British Officer, see Group captain
- Small bowel obstruction, a blockage of normal passage of digested food through the small intestine
- Small business owner, small business activities
- Sommers-Bausch Observatory, an astronomical observatory on the University of Colorado Boulder campus
- Stay-behind operation or Stay-behind organization
- Systems Biology Ontology, a project for the development of Systems Biology-oriented vocabularies and ontologies
- Tougeki – Super Battle Opera, a Japanese fighting video game tournament
