= Sara Ellison =

Astronomer

- Title: Professor
- Awards: Annie Jump Cannon Award in Astronomy (2004), American Astronomical Society Rutherford Memorial Medal (2014), Royal Society of Canada Member (2015), Royal Society of Canada's College for New Scholars

Academic background
- Education: University of Kent
- Alma mater: University of Cambridge
- Thesis: The Chemical Evolution of QSO Absorbers (2000)

Academic work
- Discipline: Astronomy
- Sub-discipline: Active galactic nucleus; Galaxy formation and evolution
- Institutions: University of Victoria
- Notable works: Galaxy Pairs in the Sloan Digital Sky Survey I-IV
- Website: http://orca.phys.uvic.ca/~sara/

Sara Ellison is an Astronomy Professor at University of Victoria. Her work involves observational extragalactic astronomy, galaxy mergers and evolution, galactic chemistry and active galactic nuclei.

== Background and education ==
Ellison was inspired to study astronomy by a teacher who was also an astronomer. The only student in a physics class in her small, all-girls school, Ellison finished the standard curriculum quickly and spent the remainder of class time discussing astronomy with her teacher.

Ellison enrolled in physics and space science at the University of Kent in 1993 and received her MSc degree in physics at this university in 1997. She went on to earn her PhD degree in astronomy from University of Cambridge in 2000. After finishing her graduate studies, she worked as an ESO fellow in Chile for three years, and then joined the faculty of the University of Victoria as an assistant professor in 2003. The same year, she was selected as Canada Research Chair (Tier II), a grant given to extraordinary emerging researchers by the Canadian government. In 2008, she became an associate professor and in 2014 a full professor at the University of Victoria.

== Research ==
The main themes of Ellison's research are studying absorption lines in quasar spectra and studying the effects of environment on galaxy evolution. Her quasar work has focused on studying the chemistry of gas along the line-of-sight to quasars such as Damped Lyman-alpha systems and the Lyman-alpha forest. Much of Ellison's most recent work has focused on using close pairs of galaxies in the Sloan Digital Sky Survey to investigate how galaxy interactions affect galaxy evolution.

== Personal ==
In addition to her work in astronomy, Ellison has been involved in science outreach since 1992. She appeared on CBC Radio's Quirks & Quarks to answer questions about lunar landing sites. In a 2015 interview with the Vancouver Sun, she spoke about how she got interested in astronomy. Her hobbies include painting on stretched canvas in acrylics. An accomplished amateur athlete, Ellison has a Boston Qualifying marathon time and age group wins in both running and triathlon.

== Honours and awards ==
- 2021: Canadian Astronomical Society Peter G. Martin Award for mid-career achievement
- 2020-2022: President, Canadian Astronomical Society
- 2018-2020: Vice President, Canadian Astronomical Society
- 2015: Elected member of the Royal Society of Canada's College for New Scholars
- 2014: Royal Society of Canada Rutherford Memorial medal in physics
- 2009: Faculty of Science excellence in research award
- 2007: NSERC Discovery Accelerator grant
- 2004: Royal Astronomical Society of Canada Ovenden lecturer
- 2004: American Astronomical Society Annie Jump Cannon Award in Astronomy
- 2001: Royal Astronomical Society PhD thesis prize (runner-up)
