= Annie Jump Cannon Award in Astronomy =

Awarded by the American Astronomical Society (AAS) to a woman resident of North America

The Annie Jump Cannon Award in Astronomy is awarded annually by the American Astronomical Society (AAS) to a woman resident of North America, who is within five years of receipt of a PhD, for distinguished contributions to astronomy or for similar contributions in related sciences which have immediate application to astronomy. The awardee is invited to give a talk at an AAS meeting and is given a $1,500 honorarium. The award is named in honor of American astronomer Annie Jump Cannon.

Margaret Burbidge was due to be given the 1972 award, but she refused it on the grounds of gender discrimination, stating: "It is high time that discrimination in favor of, as well as against, women in professional life be removed". This prompted the AAS to set up its first committee on the status of women in astronomy and they ceased issuing the award directly. From 1973 to 2004 the American Association of University Women issued the awards, on advice from the AAS. The AAS resumed direct issuing of the award in 2005.

== List of winners ==
Source: American Astronomical Society

| Year | Recipient |
|---|---|
Awarded by the AAS
| 1934 | Cecilia Payne-Gaposchkin |
| 1937 | Charlotte Moore Sitterly |
| 1940 | Julie Vinter Hansen |
| 1943 | Antonia Maury |
| 1946 | Emma Vyssotsky |
| 1949 | Helen Sawyer Hogg |
| 1952 | Ida Barney |
| 1955 | Helen Dodson Prince |
| 1958 | Margaret Mayall |
| 1962 | Margaret Harwood |
| 1965 | Erika Böhm-Vitense |
| 1968 | Henrietta Swope |
Awarded by the AAUW with advice of AAS
| 1974 | Beatrice Tinsley |
| 1976 | Catharine Garmany |
| 1978 | Paula Szkody |
| 1980 | Lee Anne Willson |
| 1982 | Judith Young |
| 1984 | Harriet Dinerstein |
| 1986 | Rosemary Wyse |
| 1988 | Karen Jean Meech |
| 1989 | Jacqueline Hewitt |
| 1990 | Claudia Megan Urry |
| 1991 | Jane Luu |
| 1992 | Elizabeth Lada |
| 1993 | Stefi Baum |
| 1994 | Andrea Ghez |
| 1995 | Suzanne Madden |
| 1996 | Joan Najita |
| 1997 | Chung-Pei Ma |
| 1998 | Victoria M. Kaspi |
| 1999 | Sally Oey |
| 2000 | Alycia J. Weinberger |
| 2001 | Amy Barger |
| 2002 | Vassiliki Kalogera |
| 2003 | Annette Ferguson |
| 2004 | Sara Ellison |
Awarded by the AAS
| 2006 | Lisa J. Kewley |
| 2007 | Ann Hornschemeier |
| 2008 | Jenny Greene |
| 2009 | Alicia M. Soderberg |
| 2010 | Anna Frebel |
| 2011 | Rachel Mandelbaum |
| 2012 | Heather Knutson |
| 2013 | Sarah Dodson-Robinson |
| 2014 | Emily Levesque |
| 2015 | Smadar Naoz |
| 2016 | Laura A. Lopez |
| 2017 | Rebekah Dawson |
| 2018 | Ilse Cleeves |
| 2019 | Blakesley Burkhart |
| 2020 | Caroline Morley |
| 2021 | Laura Kreidberg |
| 2022 | Eve Lee |
| 2023 | Marta Bryan |
| 2024 | Jennifer Bergner |
| 2025 | Maya Fishbach |
| 2026 | Mary Anne Limbach |

== See also ==
- List of astronomy awards
- List of women astronomers
- List of prizes, medals, and awards for women in science
- Prizes named after people
