= Local Leo Cold Cloud =

Interstellar cold cloud located in the Local Bubble

Interstellar cloud
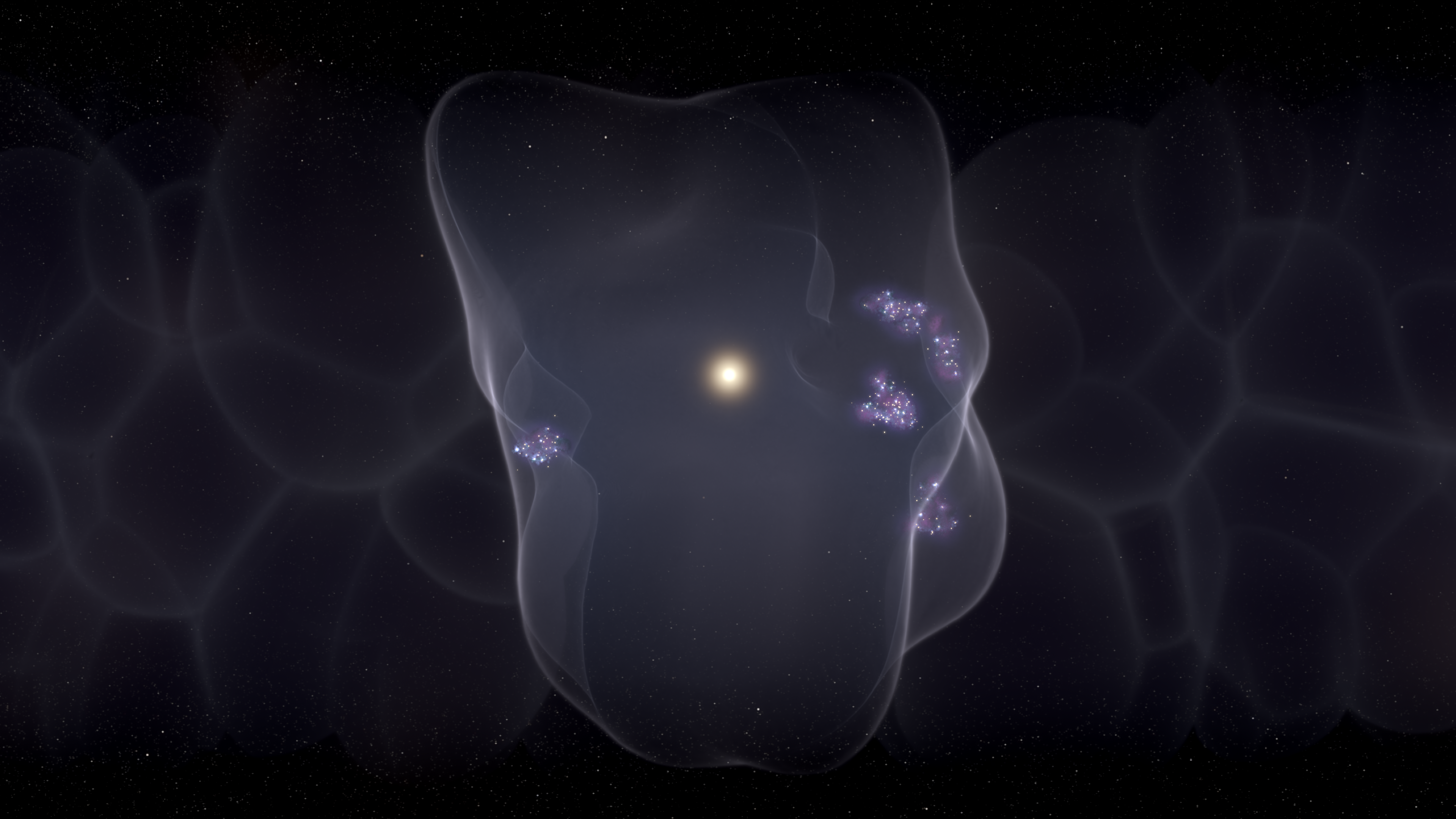
- Illustration of the Local Bubble

Observation data
- Distance: 36.8-79.2 ly (11.3-24.3 pc)
- Notable features: Closest cold neutral cloud
- Designations: LLCC, Cloud A

The Local Leo Cold Cloud (LLCC) is a relatively nearby cloud of interstellar gas embedded in the Local Bubble. Its distance from Earth ranges from 11.3 to 24.3 parsecs. It is very cold compared to the surrounding environment with the cloud itself having a temperature of 20 Kelvin while the surrounding bubble has a temperature of around 1,000,000 Kelvin.

== Discovery ==
It was first observed by Gerrit Verschuur using the Green Banks Telescope, a 300-foot radio telescope. He was looking at intermediate velocity clouds when he discovered a low velocity cold cloud which he named “Cloud A” along with other similar clouds.

== Properties ==
It is composed of 0.2 solar masses of neutral Hydrogen gas. The cloud is very elongated and thin with certain fine filaments of the cloud extending towards the stars HD 85259 and HD 83023. It is tentatively thought that the cloud is split into two concentrations which are connected by a long ridge of Hydrogen. The peculiar elongated shape of the LLCC seems to be caused by regional magnetic fields. The northern parts of the cloud have not been thoroughly mapped out. It has a high brightness. The hydrogen atom density in this cloud is 3,000 atoms per cubic centimeter, which is dense for interstellar medium. Thermal infrared radiation from dust in the cloud can be detected at 0.1 mm.

Compared to the surrounding environment, the temperature of the neutral gas is cold ranging from 15-30 Kelvin while the temperature of the Local Bubble is about 1,000,000 Kelvin.

=== Velocities ===
The cloud as a whole moves at an average velocity of +3.6 km/s but different areas of the cloud have a wide range of velocities with the southern and eastern parts of the cloud moving at +3.8 km/s and northern regions moving slightly faster than the rest of the cloud at around +3.9 km/s. The southwest side has a velocity of 1.19 km/s which varies smoothly into 1.49 km/s in the northeast edge of the cloud.

== Environment ==
It is located in the Local Bubble, a 500-light year cavity in the interstellar medium that contains the Solar System. In the Local Bubble, specifically in the vicinity of the Solar System, there are several large, cold clouds that are dense. The two most notable ones are the Local Ribbon of Cold Clouds (LRCC), Local Lynx of Cold Clouds (LxCC) and the Local Leo Cold Clouds (LLCC). The LLCC is among the largest and the most studied of these clouds.
