= Eve Lee =

Canadian astrophysicist

- Education: University of Toronto University of California, Berkeley
- Awards: Annie Jump Cannon Award in Astronomy
- Scientific career
- Fields: Astrophysics
- Workplaces: McGill University
- Thesis: The Late-Time Formation and Dynamical Signatures of Small Planets (2017)
- Doctoral advisor: Eugene Chiang

Eve Jihyun Lee is a Canadian astrophysicist, and an assistant professor of physics at McGill University. Her research concerns star formation and planet formation, including the formation of super-Earths.

== Education and career ==
Lee studied astronomy and physics at the University of Toronto, with a minor in mathematics. She graduated with high distinction in 2011, under the mentorship of Norman Murray, and was granted a master's degree there in 2012. Next, she went to the University of California, Berkeley for continued graduate study in astrophysics. She earned a second master's degree in 2014 and completed her Ph.D. in 2017. Her doctoral dissertation, The Late-Time Formation and Dynamical Signatures of Small Planets, was supervised by Eugene Chiang.

After postdoctoral research as a Sherman Fairchild Postdoctoral Scholar at the California Institute of Technology, Lee became an assistant professor of physics at McGill University in 2019.

== Recognition ==
Lee was the 2022 recipient of the Annie Jump Cannon Award in Astronomy, of the American Astronomical Society, "for her illuminating work on the formation of stars, debris disks, and planets", and the 2022 recipient of the Professor M. K. Vainu Bappu Gold Medal of the Astronomical Society of India. She was selected as a keynote speaker at the 2024 meeting of the American Astronomical Society.
