= Rachel Mandelbaum =

American astrophysicist

- Education: Princeton University (A.B., Ph.D.)
- Awards: Alfred P. Sloan Fellowship; Annie Jump Cannon Award in Astronomy
- Scientific career
- Fields: Astrophysics, Gravitational lensing
- Workplaces: Carnegie Mellon University
- Thesis: Weak gravitational lensing analysis of Sloan Digital Sky Survey data (2006)
- Doctoral advisor: Uros Seljak
- Website: http://www.andrew.cmu.edu/user/rmandelb/

Rachel Mandelbaum is a professor of astrophysics at Carnegie Mellon University, studying cosmology and galactic evolution with a focus on dark matter and dark energy. Since 2025, she has served as head of Carnegie Mellon's Department of Physics. Much of her work has used the phenomenon of gravitational lensing of galaxies and she has made significant improvements in the calibration of lensing parameters.

== Education ==
Mandelbaum received her A.B. in physics with highest honors from Princeton University in 2000.

She received her Ph.D. in physics from Princeton University in 2006 and is a professor of physics and head of the Department of Physics at Carnegie Mellon University.

== Research ==
Mandelbaum studies cosmology using the technique of weak gravitational lensing. She has contributed to more than 100 published papers since 2011. She served as the spokesperson for the LSST Dark Energy Science Collaboration, elected in 2019 and serving until July 1, 2021.

== Personal life ==
Mandelbaum is an Orthodox Jew. She is open about her faith.

== Awards ==
Mandelbaum has received numerous awards including the Alfred P. Sloan Fellowship in 2013, the Department of Energy Early Career Award in 2012 and the Annie Jump Cannon Award in Astronomy from the American Astronomical Society in 2011. In 2019, she was named a Simons Investigator by the Simons Foundation.
