= Caroline Morley =

American scientist

- Education: Massachusetts Institute of Technology University of California, Santa Cruz
- Awards: Annie Jump Cannon Award in Astronomy
- Scientific career
- Workplaces: The University of Texas
- Thesis: Clouds and Hazes in Exoplanets and Brown Dwarfs (2016)
- Doctoral advisor: Jonathan Fortney

Caroline Morley is an American scientist, teacher and astronomer researching exoplanet atmosphere science.

== Education and career ==
Morley is an assistant professor at The University of Texas, in the department of astronomy. Morley’s knowledge is displayed in multiple informational articles, including scientific information about climate, planetary mass, and use of astrological equipment. Morley earned a bachelor's degree in physics, earth, atmosphere, and planetary sciences from Massachusetts Institute of Technology, in 2010. She then earned her PhD from the University of California, Santa Cruz in 2016.

== Research ==
Morley’s focus is the atmospheres and exoplanets from terrestrial planets like earth and other larger planets. She has been working and studying in Texas since 2018.

An example of work from Morley is her article on water vapor in the atmosphere of Neptune, “ A Mirage or an Oasis”. This article elaborates on observations and research made by her and her colleagues. This article is exact and mathematically explained as well as explained beyond the math and scientific terms.

== Awards ==
In 2020 Morley won the Annie Jump Cannon Award for Astronomy, which recognizes outstanding research and promise for future research by a woman researcher within 5 years of earning her PhD.
