= Sally Oey =

American astronomer

Dr. Sally Oey is an American astronomer at the University of Michigan and an expert in massive, hot stars which are often precursors to supernovae. In 1999, she was awarded the Annie J. Cannon Award in Astronomy by the American Astronomical Society (AAS) and, in 2006, was invited to give an address to the 206th meeting of the AAS. Oey is currently a professor and is a member of the board of the Gemini Observatory. In 2023, the University of Michigan named her an Arthur F. Thurnau Professor in recognition of her contributions to undergraduate education.

== Early life and education ==
Oey was born in Ithaca, New York, to Chinese Indonesian parents who migrated to the U.S. in 1957. She attended Bryn Mawr College, graduating in 1986. She went on to obtain a PhD in astronomy from the University of Arizona in 1995.

== Academic career ==
From 1998 to 2001, she worked at the Space Telescope Science Institute. From 2001 to 2004, she was an assistant astronomer at the Lowell Observatory.

Oey's research group, Feedback Activity in Nearby Galaxies (FANG), focuses on massive star feedback to the interstellar and intergalactic medium, on a local, global and cosmic scale. These feedbacks include:

- Radiative feedback: HII regions, Lyman continuum-emitting galaxies
- Chemical feedback: Enrichment processes and galactic chemical evolution
- Kinematic feedback: Supernova-driven superbubbles and galactic superwinds
- Massive star and clusters

Finding no star bigger than 200 solar masses, she and her colleagues at the University of Michigan at Ann Arbor have found evidence for a size limit in a survey of other clusters within our galaxy and in the nearby satellite galaxy, Magellanic clouds. "It is not clear whether the size is limited by the physics of star formation or by the size of the parent gas cloud. Larger stars, perhaps of up to 500 solar masses, may have existed in the early universe," Oey says.

Oey's dedication to undergraduate education earned her an Arthur F. Thurnau Professorship at the University of Michigan in 2023, where she was instrumental in quadrupling the number of undergraduate majors and minors over the previous decade, promoting astronomy study for interdisciplinary students pursuing majors in other fields, and incorporating approaches to diversity, equity, and inclusion into her teaching.
