= Elizabeth Lada =

American astronomer

Elizabeth Lada is an American astronomer. She is the Professor of Astronomy at the University of Florida.

== Biography ==
Lada received her Bachelor of Science in Physics degree from Yale University in 1983 and her Ph.D. in astronomy from the University of Texas in 1990. She worked at the University of Maryland, College Park for a time. She is currently Professor of Astronomy at the University of Florida.

In 1992, the American Astronomical Society (AAS) awarded Lada the Annie Jump Cannon Award in Astronomy. She was also named a Hubble Fellow during her work at the University of Maryland. In 1998, she received the Presidential Early Career Award for Scientists and Engineers. In 1999, he received the National Science Foundation CAREER Award.

Lada was named a Fellow of the AAS in 2023, "for pioneering the use of infrared array detectors to push ground-based infrared imaging limits and survey giant molecular clouds for obscured populations of young stars; for transformative work on a broad range of problems in star formation including constraining the initial mass function within giant molecular clouds and performing the first robust measurements of the frequency and lifetimes of circumstellar disks in young clusters; and for extensive service to the astronomical community as a member of many boards and committees".
