= Paula Szkody =

American astronomer

- Born: July 17, 1948 (age 78); Detroit, Michigan
- Education: Michigan State University, University of Washington
- Awards: Annie Jump Cannon Award in Astronomy
- Scientific career
- Fields: Astronomy
- Workplaces: University of Washington
- Website: http://www.astro.washington.edu/szkody/

Paula Szkody (born July 17, 1948) is a professor in the Department of Astronomy at the University of Washington in Seattle. She served as president of the American Astronomical Society from 2020 to 2022.

== Early life and education ==
Szkody was born on July 17, 1948, in Detroit, Michigan. She earned her B.A. degree in astrophysics at Michigan State University in 1970, and her Ph.D. in astronomy from the University of Washington in 1975.

== Work ==
Paula Szkody specializes in cataclysmic variable stars, which are binary star systems that periodically undergo energetic outbursts. She is an active participant in the Sloan Digital Sky Survey (SDSS) searching for new dwarf novae and has worked with the XTE, ASCA, ROSAT, IUE, HST, EUVE and XMM-Newton space missions.

== Activities ==
In 2005 she became the editor-in-chief of the astronomical journal Publications of the Astronomical Society of the Pacific (PASP). She is also very active in professional-amateur collaboration, especially in conjunction with the American Association of Variable Star Observers, for whom she has served both as an officer on the board (2003-2009) and, for the term 2007-09, as President of the organization. Szkody was president of the American Astronomical Society from 2020 to 2022.

== Honors and awards ==
In 1978, she was awarded the Annie Jump Cannon Award in Astronomy by the American Astronomical Society.

As of 1994, she is a fellow of the American Association for the Advancement of Science.

A minor planet has been named after her.
