= Fiske Planetarium =

Planetarium in the United States

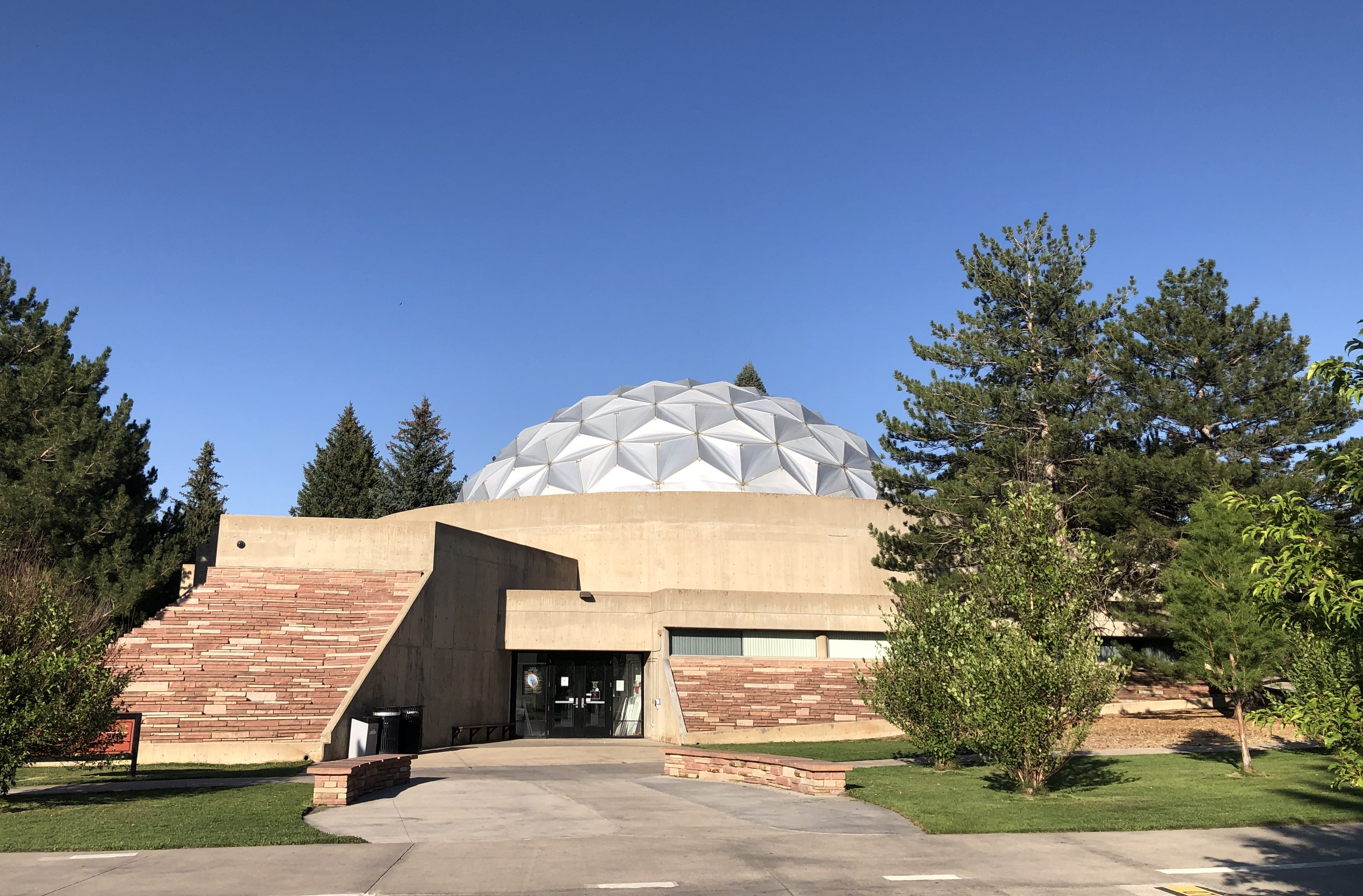
- Fiske Planetarium in 2022
- Established: September 19, 1975
- Location: 2414 Regent Dr, Boulder, Colorado, United States
- Director: John Keller
- Owner: University of Colorado
- Website: www.colorado.edu/fiske

Fiske Planetarium (est. 1975) is one of the largest planetariums in the United States. They offer fulldome films, live talks, laser and liquid sky music shows, as well as public gatherings for astronomical and NASA-related events. It is a constituent of the Department of Astrophysical and Planetary Sciences at the University of Colorado Boulder.

The planetarium utilizes an geodesic dome with an interior diameter of 65 feet, making it as the largest planetarium between Chicago and Los Angeles. Its theater is currently equipped with a Megastar IIA projector alongside Sky Skan's Digital Sky 2, an 8k digital hybrid projection system capable of projecting approximately 59 million pixels. They can currently seat up to 200 guests in their theater.

== History ==
Fiske was founded in 1975 with a donation from University of Colorado alumni, Wallace Franz Fiske (class of 1917). The donation was made to CU upon his death in 1966, in the amount of $1.13 million. While a quarter of this amount was dedicated to the university's music department, the remaining amount was "to build and equip a planetarium for the University of Colorado." By the time the university's astronomers decided to act on the donation in 1971, their share had grown to $1.61 million.

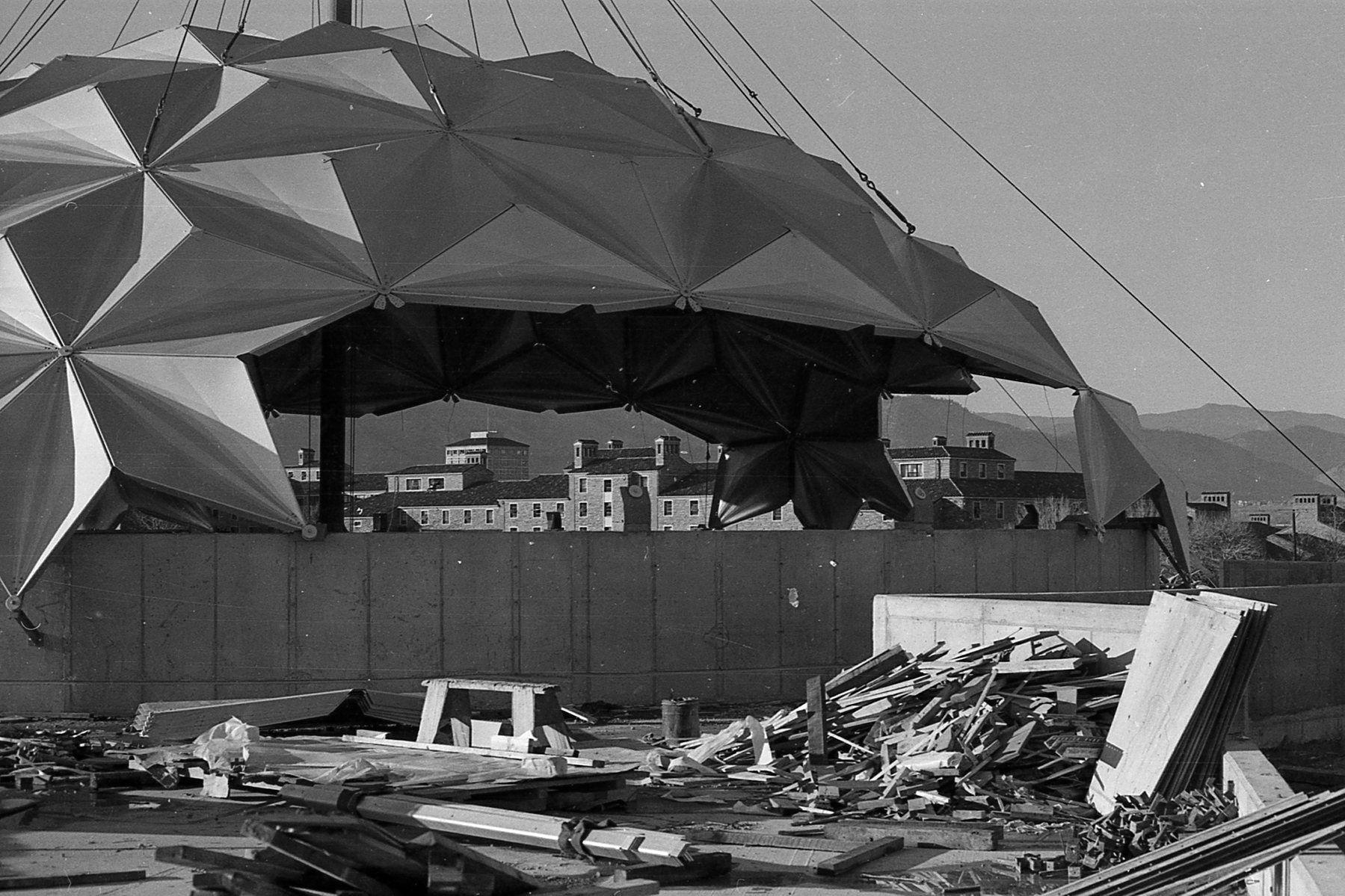
Fiske Planetarium's Construction (Marty Day, 1974)

Gerrit Verschuur was brought on as Fiske's first director in 1971. James Sharp, an engineer from Strasenburgh Planetarium, oversaw the building design, organized the planetarium staff, and built auxiliary systems for Fiske. The planetarium was dedicated on Sept 19th, 1975, with doors opening to the public the following day. Opening shows included "Stardeath", a short film about supernovae written by Verschuur, and "Quaking Aspens", a visual art program by photographer Gary Metz. Fiske is a sister-facility to Sommers-Bausch Observatory.

In 1976, Fiske hosted the International Society of Planetarium Educators (now the International Planetarium Society) Conference. That same year, Fiske began programming laser shows in the theater, providing an intermittent revenue stream as well as technical training for undergraduates. In 1983, university “Science Discovery” classes started to be offered at Fiske.

In 2003, there was a major flood of the planetarium caused by a broken water main. While the projection system survived, the majority of the theater was ruined, resulting in the installation of new carpet and chairs.

In 2004, Fiske completed its first planetarium show for international distribution titled “Deep Impact: Rendezvous with a Comet”, funded by NASA in association with Ball Aerospace, JPL, and the University of Maryland. Fiske has continued to create fulldome films in the decades since.

In 2007, a Science On a Sphere exhibit was installed in the planetarium's lobby. In 2013, Fiske underwent a major upgrade in which the facility retired their 38-year-old, Zeiss Mark VI Star projector. Nicknamed Fritz after the West German engineer who oversaw its installation, it is currently on display in the lobby.
