= Annette Ferguson =

Scottish observational astrophysicist

Annette Ferguson FRSE
- Born: Annette Mairi Nelson Ferguson; Dumbarton, Scotland
- Education: University of Toronto; Johns Hopkins University
- Awards: Annie J. Cannon Award in Astronomy (2003); Friedrich Wilhelm Bessel Research Award; Fellowship of the Royal Society of Edinburgh (2016); Alexander von Humboldt Foundation (2017)
- Scientific career
- Fields: Physics; Astrophysics
- Workplaces: University of Edinburgh; Max-Planck-Institut für Astrophysik; Kapteyn Astronomical Institute; Institute of Astronomy, Cambridge
- Website: https://www.ph.ed.ac.uk/people/annette-ferguson

Annette Mairi Nelson Ferguson FRSE is a Scottish observational astrophysicist who specialises in the area of galaxy evolution. She is a professor at the Institute for Astronomy, Edinburgh, and holds the Personal Chair in Observational Astrophysics at the School of Physics and Astronomy, University of Edinburgh.

== Career ==
Ferguson's research focuses on conducting observations of stars and interstellar gas in nearby galaxies to gain insights into the formation and evolution of systems in the Milky Way. Much of her recent work has focused on the Andromeda Galaxy, a giant spiral galaxy in our galactic neighbourhood.

Her research exploits ground-based telescopes in the Canary Islands, Chile, and Hawaii as well as sophisticated instruments on board the Hubble Space Telescope. Ferguson is also involved in planning for future exploitation of data collected by the European Space Agency's Euclid mission, and the Vera C. Rubin Observatory, which is currently under construction in Chile.

Originally from Scotland, Ferguson graduated with a BSc with Distinction in Physics and Astronomy from the University of Toronto, and obtained a PhD in Astrophysics from the Johns Hopkins University in Baltimore.

She has previously held postdoctoral fellowships at the Institute of Astronomy, Cambridge, the Kapteyn Astronomical Institute in Groningen, Netherlands, and was a Marie Curie postdoctoral fellow at the Max-Planck-Institut für Astrophysik in Garching, Germany.

Ferguson returned to Scotland in 2005, taking up a Lectureship at The University of Edinburgh, before being promoted to a Readership in 2007, and a Professorship in 2013.

== Honours ==
Ferguson received the Annie J. Cannon Award in 2003, and was elected a Fellow of the Royal Society of Edinburgh, Scotland's National Academy for Science and Letters, in March 2016. In 2017 she received the Friedrich Wilhelm Bessel Research Award from the Alexander von Humboldt Foundation.
