= Sarah Dodson-Robinson =

American astronomer

- Born: Los Angeles, California
- Education: Rochester Institute of Technology; University of California, Santa Cruz
- Known for: Astrophysics
- Awards: NSF GRFP Spitzer Fellowship; Annie Jump Cannon Award in Astronomy NSF CAREER Award
- Scientific career
- Thesis: Chemistry of planet formation (2008)
- Doctoral advisor: Gregory P Laughlin

Sarah Dodson-Robinson is an American astronomer known for her work on planet formation and an associate professor of physics and astronomy at the University of Delaware.

== Early life and education ==
She was born in Los Angeles, California. She goes by the name “Sally.” Dodson-Robinson always had an interest for Space Science. When she was 7 or 8 years old, she joined The Planetary Society and collected the mini-posters of planets and moons that came with the magazine.

Dodson-Robinson was inspired to become an astronomer by Stephen Hawking. She was later further influenced by her undergraduate and graduate advisors, Elliott Horch and Greg Laughlin, respectively.

In 2002, Dodson-Robinson received her B.S. at Rochester Institute of Technology. She then began graduate study at the University of California, Santa Cruz. There, she received her M.S. in 2005 and her Ph.D. in Astronomy and Astrophysics in June of 2008.

== Career ==
Dodson-Robinson research focuses on planet formation and planetary archaeology and also includes more traditional astronomy topics such as protostellar disk chemistry, galactic chemical evolution, and brown dwarfs. With the use of analytical theory and numerical simulations of the dynamical and chemical environment of planet growth, she is able to uncover the formation histories of exoplanets and solar system objects.

Dodson-Robinson joined the University of Texas as an assistant professor in 2009. In Spring 2014, Dodson-Robinson began work at The University of Delaware.

In 2021, Dodson-Robinson authored the textbook Origins of Giant Planets, Volume 1: Disks, dust, and planetesimals.

== Awards and honors ==
Dodson-Robinson has received multiple honors and awards for her work and research. As a graduate student in 2002, she was awarded the National Science Foundation Graduate Research Fellowship. She received the Spitzer Fellowship in 2008 and took leave from the University of Texas to use it for work at the NASA Exoplanet Science Institute.

While at the University of Texas, she was honored as a Charter Member into the Society for Teaching Excellence. In 2013, she received the Annie Jump Cannon Award in Astronomy from the American Astronomical Society for her work on the formation of planetary systems. That year she was also awarded a National Science Foundation’s CAREER Award for her work, titled “Giant Planets in Dusty Disks.”
