= Brooke Simmons =

American astrophysicist

Brooke D. Simmons is an American astrophysicist known for her research on galaxy formation and evolution, the shapes of galaxies, and active galactic nuclei. She is also known for her coordination of citizen science, both in astrophysics through the Galaxy Zoo and in crowdsourced disaster management. She works in the United Kingdom as a professor of physics at Lancaster University.

== Research ==
Simmons was a coauthor of the 2013 Galaxy Zoo 2 Catalog, which listed the shapes of over 300,000 galaxies, and a coauthor of a 2015 study using the Hubble Space Telescope that provided a causal connection between galaxy mergers and active galactic nuclei. A 2021 study with Simmons as coauthor showed a link between the shapes of barred spiral galaxies and quenching, the shutdown of star formation in galaxies.

Since 2014, Simmons has extended the crowdsourced science efforts of astrophysics site Zooniverse to disaster management, heading the Zooniverse Planetary Response Network project. This work has included tracking flooding in Sudan, providing responders with information about safe transportation routes after hurricanes, and comparing before and after aerial photographs to determine the damage caused by earthquakes in Venezuela.

== Education and career ==
Simmons graduated with honors in astrophysics from Princeton University in 2001. She continued her studies at Yale University, where she received a double masters degree in 2003. After a four-year leave for family reasons, she completed her Ph.D. at Yale in 2011. Her dissertation, Black Hole Growth and Host Galaxy Co-Evolution Over 8 Billion Years of Cosmic Time, was supervised by Meg Urry.

Next, Simmons worked as a postdoctoral researcher at the University of Oxford from 2012 to 2015, and at the University of California, San Diego from 2015 to 2018, with the support of NASA as an Einstein Fellow. She joined Lancaster University as a lecturer in 2018, was promoted to reader in 2021, and became a full professor there in 2024.
