= Jenny Greene =

American astrophysicist

Jenny Greene (born October 9, 1978) is an astrophysicist and professor of Astrophysical Sciences at Princeton University. She is notable for her work on supermassive black holes and the galaxies in which they reside. Her work also involves a partnership with the Princeton Gravity Initiative and as co-founder and academic advisor to the Prison Teaching Initiative (PTI) at Princeton University.

== Biography ==
In 2000, Greene received a B.S. in astronomy and physics (summa cum laude) from Yale University. She moved to Harvard where she earned her Ph.D. in astronomy, with a thesis entitled The Growth of Black Holes: From Primordial Seeds to Local Demographics. After a post-doctoral fellowship at Princeton, she became an assistant professor of astronomy at UT Austin. Since 2011, she has been a faculty member in the Astrophysical Sciences department at Princeton where she is currently a professor of astrophysics.

Her broad research interests include measurements of black hole masses, the connection between supermassive black holes and galaxies, stellar and gas kinematics of galactic nuclei, and diffuse light in galaxy clusters. In a 2022 study, "The Nature of Low-surface-brightness Galaxies in the Hyper Suprime-Cam Survey" Greene utilizes imaging technology to study in the ability to distinguish and identify low-surface-brightness galaxies. The PTI provides college-level education and other educational opportunities, such as research experiences for undergraduate students (REU), to the incarcerated and formerly incarcerated in New Jersey correctional facilities. She has been involved in the effort and growth of the PTI as a post-doc fellow at Princeton since its founding in 2005 and as academic advisor of the program in 2017, when REUs through PTI began.

== Awards and honors ==
- 2000: Phi Beta Kappa
- 2000: Yale University, George Beckwith Prize in Astronomy
- 2002-2003: Certificate of Distinction in Teaching
- 2001–2003: NSF Graduate Student Research Fellowship
- 2006–2009: Hubble Fellow
- 2006–2010: Carnegie-Princeton Fellow
- 2008: AAS, Annie Jump Cannon Award
- 2009: Harvard University Astronomy Department, The Bok Prize
- 2011: Alfred P. Sloan Fellowship
