= Margaret Mayall =

American astronomer

- Born: January 27, 1902; Iron Hill, Maryland, US
- Died: December 6, 1995 (aged 93); Cambridge, Massachusetts, US
- Education: Swarthmore College
- Alma mater: Swarthmore College; Radcliffe College (M.A.)
- Scientific career
- Fields: Astronomy

Margaret Walton Mayall (January 27, 1902 – December 6, 1995) was an American astronomer. She was the director of the American Association of Variable Star Observers (AAVSO) from 1949 to 1973.

== Early life and education ==
Mayall (born Margaret Lyle Walton) was born in Iron Hill, Maryland, on January 27, 1902. The northern lights and Halley's comet in 1910 are stated to have stimulated her interest in astronomy at a young age. She attended the University of Delaware, where her interest in astronomy grew after taking math and chemistry courses. She then moved to Swarthmore College, where she received her Bachelor's Degree in Mathematics in 1925.

She earned an MA in astronomy from Radcliffe College, Harvard University, in 1928 and worked as a research assistant and astronomer at Harvard College Observatory from 1924 to 1954, initially working with Annie Jump Cannon on classifying star spectra and estimating star brightness. During this time, she would spend summers working with Margaret Hardwood of the Maria Mitchell Observatory in Nantucket, MA, where she became interested in researching variable stars. She was a research staff member at the Heat Research Laboratory, Special Weapons Group, Massachusetts Institute of Technology from 1943 to 1946.

== Personal life ==
While working in Nantucket, she met Robert Newton Mayall, a member of the American Association of Variable Star Observers (AAVSO), and would marry in 1927. They co-wrote several books on sundial and other subjects while working with the Ernst Sundial Collection of Harvard.

She died of congestive heart failure in Cambridge, Massachusetts, on 6 December 1995.

== Awards ==
In 1957, she was the recipient of the G. Bruce Blair Gold Medal from the Western Amateur Society.

In 1958, she won the Annie J. Cannon Award in Astronomy.

In 1982, a minor planet was named, 3342 Fivesparks, in honor of her and her husband's home in Cambridge.
