= Joan Najita =

American astronomer

Joan R. Najita is an American astronomer and Chief Scientist at National Optical Astronomy Observatory.

== Career ==
She has been at NOAO since 1998. In 1993 she received her PhD from University of California, Berkeley under supervision of Frank Shu.

She is an expert in star formation and the formation and evolution of planetary systems, in particular the gas in circumstellar disks.

== Awards ==
In 1996, Najita was awarded the Annie Jump Cannon Award in Astronomy.
