= Suzanne Madden =

American astronomer

Suzanne Madden is an American astronomer who works as a researcher at the Saclay Nuclear Research Centre in Paris, France. The American Astronomical Society honored her work by awarding her the Annie J. Cannon Prize in 1995.

Madden has studied dwarf galaxies and the interstellar medium in other galaxies. She has guaranteed time on the Herschel Space Observatory.

Suzanne has been an active member of the International Astronomical Union with past affiliations in Division VIII Galaxies and the Universe (until 2012) and Commission 28 Galaxies (until 2015). Her current affiliations include Division H Interstellar Matter and Local Universe and Division J Galaxies and Cosmology.
