= Ilse Cleeves =

American astrophysicist

- Education: Rice University, BS University of Michigan, Ph.D.
- Awards: Annie Jump Cannon Award in Astronomy Packard Fellowship
- Scientific career
- Workplaces: University of Virginia
- Thesis: Molecular Signposts of the Physics and Chemistry of Planet Formation (2015)
- Doctoral advisor: Edwin A. Bergin

Lauren Ilsedore Cleeves is an American astrophysicist and an assistant professor in the Department of Astronomy at the University of Virginia. She is specialized in the study of protoplanetary disks.

== Education ==
Cleeves received her Bachelor of Science from Rice University in Houston, Texas in 2009. She then went on to receive her PhD from the University of Michigan in Ann Arbor in 2015.

== Career ==
From 2015 to 2018, Cleeves was a Hubble Fellow at the Smithsonian Astrophysical Observatory. Before that, she received her PhD from the University of Michigan under supervision of Edwin Bergin.

She is an expert in astrochemical signatures of circumstellar disks. She studies the chemistry, composition, and structure of young planetary systems in formation around low-mass stars, using theoretical modelling and observations from Atacama Large Millimeter Array and Herschel Space Observatory. She has studied the origin of water on Earth.

== Awards ==
In 2018, Cleeves was awarded the Annie Jump Cannon Award in Astronomy "for her groundbreaking work on planet formation and protoplanetary disks".

In 2019, Cleeves was awarded a Packard Fellowship
