= Sheila Tobias =

American researcher (1935–2021)

- From a 1972 newspaper
- Born: April 26, 1935; New York City, U.S.
- Died: July 6, 2021 (aged 86); Tucson, Arizona, U.S.
- Occupations: Researcher, college administrator, lecturer
- Spouses: Carlos Stern (m. 1970; div. 1978); Carl Tomizuka (m. 1987; died 2017)

Sheila Tobias (April 26, 1935 – July 6, 2021) was an American college administrator who studied the gender gap in math and science at the college level.

== Early life ==
Tobias was born in Brooklyn, New York, the eldest daughter of Paul Tobias and Rose Steinberger Tobias. She graduated from Radcliffe College in 1957, and earned two master's degrees (an MA in 1961 and an MPhil in 1974) from Columbia University.

== Career ==
Tobias was a journalist in Germany and London after college, wrote for the New York Herald Tribune, and taught history courses at the City College of New York. She worked at Cornell University as assistant to the vice president for academic affairs from 1967 to 1970, and organized an early women's studies course at Cornell. From 1970 to 1978, she was associate vice provost of Wesleyan University, helping the school through the process of becoming co-educational. At Wesleyan, she began studying math anxiety (a phrase she coined) and other phenomena around the gender gap in STEM fields. She opened a math clinic, staffed by tutors and counselors, and published her first book, Overcoming Math Anxiety (1978).

Tobias moved to Tucson in the 1980s. She taught women's studies courses at the University of Arizona, and was outreach coordinator for the Alfred P. Sloan Foundation's Professional Science Master's Degree initiative.

Tobias served on the board of the Association for Women in Science, and was co-president of Veteran Feminists of America. She was active in the National Organization for Women (NOW), the Pima County/Tucson Women's Commission, and the Women's Studies Advisory Council at the University of Arizona. She served on the Committee on the Status of Women in Physics of the American Physical Society in the 1980s, and was a delegate to the International Conference on Women in Physics, held in Paris in 2002. In 2006, her name was added to the Women's Plaza of Honor at the University of Arizona.

== Personal life ==
Tobias married Carlos Stern in 1970; they divorced in 1982. She married a physics professor, Carl Tomizuka in 1987; he died in 2017. She died at a nursing home in Tucson on July 6, 2021, aged 86. Her papers are held in the Schlesinger Library.

== Books ==
- Overcoming Math Anxiety (1978, 1994)
- What Kinds of Guns Are They Buying for Your Butter? A Beginner's Guide to Defense, Weaponry and Military Spending (1982, with Peter Goudinoff, Stefan Leader, and Shelah Leader)
- Succeed with Math: Every Student's Guide to Conquering Math Anxiety (1987)
- Rethinking Science as a Career: Perceptions and Realities in the Physical Sciences (1995, with Daryl Chubin and Kevin Aylesworth)
- They're Not Dumb, They're Different: Stalking the Second Tier (1990)
- Women, Militarism, and War: Essays in History, Politics, and Social Theory (1990, edited with Jean Bethke Elshtain)
- Breaking the Science Barrier: How to Explore and Understand the Sciences (1992, with Carl Tomizuka)
- Revitalizing Undergraduate Science: Why Some Things Work and Most Don't (1992)
- The Hidden Curriculum: Faculty-Made Tests in College Science (1997, with Jacqueline Raphael)
- Faces of Feminism: An Activist's Reflections on the Women's Movement (1997, 2018)
- Science Teaching as a Profession. Why It Isn't. How It Could Be (2010, with Anne Baffert)
- Banishing Math Anxiety (2012)

== Selected articles and essays ==
- "Women's studies: Its origins, its organization and its prospects" (1978)
- "Math Mental Health: Going Beyond Math Anxiety" (1991)
- "Physics: for women, the last frontier" (1996, with Meg Urry and Aparna Venkatesan)
- "The Science-Trained Professional: A New Breed for the New Century" (1998, with Frans A. J. Birrer)
- "Who will study physics, and why?" (1999, with Frans A. J. Birrer)
- "Some Recent Developments in Teacher Education in Mathematics and Science: A Review and Commentary" (1999)
- "From Innovation to Change: Forging A Physics Education Reform Agenda for the 21st Century" (2000)
- "Vox Populi to Music" (2004, with Shelah Leader)
- "Empowering Science Teachers" (2012, with Anne Baffert)
