= Alycia J. Weinberger =

Astronomer

Alycia J. Weinberger is a staff member at the Carnegie Institution of Washington. Weinberger started her recent position as co-chair of the National Academies of Sciences, Engineering, and Medicine in 2023. She is considered an observational astronomer and her focus is in planet formation, exoplanets, and brown dwarfs. She examines early development of planets and their interactions with surrounding circumstellar disk. She continues to examine these early developments with the techniques that include high angular resolution imaging and infrared spectroscopy. Before joining the Carnegie scientific staff in 2001, she was a Near Infrared Camera and Multi-Object Spectrometer (NICMOS) postdoctoral researcher and astrobiology postdoctoral fellow at University of California, Los Angeles (UCLA). She received her B.A. in Physics from the University of Pennsylvania and her PhD from Caltech. In 1991, she was recognized by the Phi Beta Kappa. She is the 2000 winner of the Annie J. Cannon Award in Astronomy and the Vainu Bappu Gold Medal of Astronomical Society of India for 2000 (awarded 2002). In 2005, Weinberger co-authored a study identifying a concentration of warm silicate dust orbiting the Sun-like star BD+20 307, concluding that this debris field was most likely generated by huge, violent collisions between rocky planetesimals. In 2019 she was selected to become a fellow of the American Astronomical Society. Dr Weinberger has worked at the Carnegie Science Earth and Planets Labretory since 2001 and was promoted to Associate Division Director in 2023. She was a full time staff scientist there for 24 years before she became promoted, and has been in this position ever since.

Weinberger studies the formation of planets, using observational methods such as ultra-high spatial-resolution imaging using advanced instrumentation on the ground and in space including the Hubble Space Telescope. Her research focuses on disks surrounding nearby stars in order to understand the conditions for the birth of new planets.Alycia Weinberger has worked as a Principle Investigator or Co-Investigator on numerous HST programs over the span of her career to image disks, specifically nearby dusty debris disks. Her current work is with the Magellan Extreme Adaptive Optics System also known as MagAO-X, to image disks at measurable wavelengths.

In 2013, Weinberger was part of a research team of astronomers from around the globe who discovered exoplanet HD 106906 b. This discovery was notable due to the planet’s distance away from its host star, which raised questions and ideas about the formation of planets. The planet has a mass size of 11 Jupiters and is a Gas Giant planet. Alyscia Weinberger’s Ph.D research was about environments around massive black holes in active galaxies rather than planet information.

Alycia Weinberger, among a team of astronomers published their work in The Astrophysical Journal about their new discovery. They found a forming planet around a young star called TW Hydrae, approximately 10 million years old, in the constellation Hydra. TW Hydrae consists of a disk of dust and gas in rotation, in which small planets are born. This young star may have given astronomers an insight of how Earth and the planets of the Solar system may have looked 4.6 billion years ago, during its formation. It is the nearest planet to be observed which is also one of the most distant planetary mass companions that has ever been directly observed and is projectedly closer to the binary system HD 106906 at a distance of about 650 astronomical units (AU), over 20 times greater than the distance between Neptune and the Sun. This is because of its extreme orbit which is opposite to classical core accretion theories of planet formation which suggest giant planets to be formed nearer to their stars where the proto planetary disk is richer has led astronomers to consider other possibilities such as gravitational instability or dynamical scattering by the inner system.

In 2025, Weinberger contributed to the Proxima Centauri flare study using the Atacama Large Millimeter/submillimeter Array (ALMA), examining how stellar flares may affect exoplanet habitability.

== Selected publications ==
- "Debris Disks Around Nearby Stars with Circumstellar Gas," Roberge, A. & Weinberger, A. J. 2008, ApJ, in press (astro-ph/arXiv:0711.4561)
- "Complex Organic Materials in the Circumstellar Disk of HR 4796A," Debes, J. H., Weinberger, A. J. & Schneider, G. 2007, Astrophysical Journal Letters., 673, L191
- "Stabilization of the disk around Beta Pictoris by extremely carbon-rich gas," Roberge, A., Feldman, P. D., Weinberger, A. J., Deleuil, M., & Bouret, J.-C. 2006, Nature, 441, 724
- "Evolution of Circumstellar Disks Around Normal Stars: Placing Our Solar System in Context," Meyer, M. R., Backman, D. E., Weinberger, A. J. & Wyatt, M. C. 2006, in Protostars and Planets V (University of Arizona Press: Tucson), Ed. B. Reipurth, D. Jewitt & K. Keil ISBN 978-0-8165-2654-3
- "Astrometry and radial velocities of the planet host M dwarf Gliese 317: new trigonometric distance, metallicity and upper limit to the mass of Gliese 317 b," Anglada-Escude, Guillem; et al. (2012) in The Astrophysical Journal, 764 https://iopscience.iop.org/article/10.1088/0004-637X/746/1/37
