= Meg Urry =

American astrophysicist

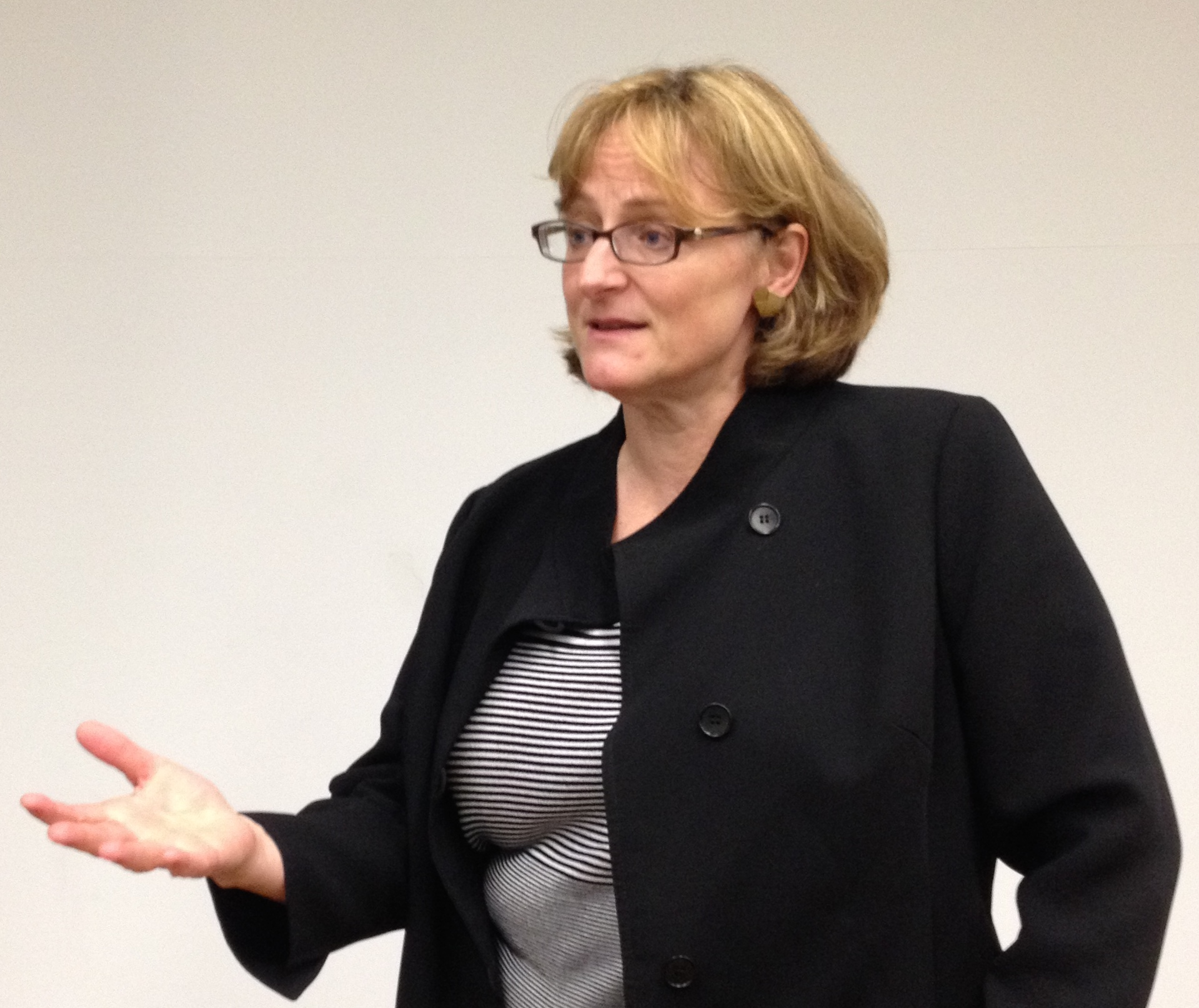
- Meg Urry speaking at Fermilab.
- Education: Tufts University, B.S. 1977 (summa cum laude); Johns Hopkins University, M.S. 1979; Johns Hopkins University, Ph.D. 1984
- Scientific career
- Fields: Astrophysics
- Workplaces: Yale University
- Doctoral advisor: Art Davidsen
- Doctoral students: Brooke Simmons

Claudia Megan Urry is an American astrophysicist, who has served as the President of the American Astronomical Society, as chair of the Department of Physics at Yale University, and as part of the Hubble Space Telescope faculty. She is the Israel Munson Professor of Physics and Astronomy at Yale University. Urry is known for establishing the unification paradigm for radio-loud active galactic nuclei, for her research on the co-evolution of supermassive black holes and galaxies, and for her advocacy for women and underrepresented groups in science.

== Early life and education ==
After growing up in Indiana and Massachusetts, Urry attended college at Tufts University, double-majoring in mathematics and physics, and graduating summa cum laude in 1977. She was elected to Phi Beta Kappa and received the N. Hobbs Knight Award for Physics. She became interested in astronomy during the summer of her junior year when she interned at the National Radio Astronomy Observatory.

Urry earned an M.S. (1979) and a Ph.D. (1984) in physics from Johns Hopkins, where her advisor was Art Davidsen. For her dissertation, she studied blazars at Goddard Space Flight Center with Richard Mushotzky.

== Career ==
After finishing her Ph.D., Urry conducted a post-doctorate at M.I.T.'s Center for Space Research, working with Claude Canizares. This was followed by another post-doctorate at the Space Telescope Science Institute (STScI), after which, in 1990, the Institute hired her as a full-time astronomer. At STScI she rose to the position of Head of the Science Program Selection Office.

Urry joined Yale's faculty in 2001, at that time as the only woman in the department. She served as Chair of the Yale Physics Department from 2007 to 2013. From 2013 to 2017 she served in the Presidential line of the American Astronomical Society, from 2013-2014 as President-Elect, 2014-2016 as President, and 2016-2017 as Past President. In 2020 she was named one of the American Astronomical Society's inaugural class of fellows.

She served from 2017-2023 on the Board of Trustees of Associated Universities, Inc. (AUI), the managing organization of the National Radio Astronomy Observatory.

Urry has been active in addressing sex inequality in astronomy and science more generally, giving more than 60 talks on the topic, including at the annual Conferences for Undergraduate Women in Physics (CUWiP). With Laura Danly, Urry co-organized the first meeting of Women in Astronomy in 1992. This meeting produced the "Baltimore Charter," which was drafted by Sheila Tobias and eventually endorsed by the Council of the American Astronomical Society. Reducing the prevalence of sexual harassment in astronomy was also an area of focus for Urry during the time she was President of the American Astronomical Society. In 2010 she won the Women in Space Science Award from the Adler Planetarium, and in 2015 she won the Edward A. Bouchet Leadership award from Yale University.

== Research ==
Urry has published over 330 papers in refereed journals, including one of the most highly cited review papers in astronomy, and was identified as a Highly Cited Author by Thomson Reuters. Her research focuses on active galactic nuclei (AGN) — galaxies whose central supermassive black holes are actively accreting matter — and the co-evolution of black holes and their host galaxies over cosmic time.

Urry's most influential contribution is establishing the unification paradigm for radio-loud AGN, demonstrating that apparently different classes — including blazars, radio galaxies, and quasars — are intrinsically the same type of object viewed at different orientations, with relativistic jets beamed toward the observer in the case of blazars. She used variability and spectral energy distribution analysis to probe the physics of relativistic jets and the demographics of blazars.

Urry and her collaborators designed major multiwavelength surveys — including the Great Observatories Origins Deep Survey (GOODS) and Stripe 82X — to quantify black hole growth over the past 12 billion years, establishing that roughly three-quarters of all accretion onto supermassive black holes is obscured by dust. Her group also showed that AGN host galaxies are predominantly disk-dominated rather than merger remnants, suggesting that most black hole accretion is not triggered by galaxy mergers. She and her research group participated in the Sloan Digital Sky Survey to investigate the growth of supermassive black holes. More recently, her group has developed machine learning techniques to study galaxy properties and to characterize spectral energy distributions.

== Teaching and outreach ==
In 2002, Urry created one of the first flipped classroom versions of introductory physics at Yale. She is the founding physics instructor for the Global Teaching Project, which provides Advanced Placement physics courses to high school students in underserved rural areas of Mississippi. Urry has taught at the program's summer residential sessions since 2017 and provides remote lectures during the academic year. She also writes about science for CNN.com.

== Awards and honors ==
- N. Hobbs Knight Award for Physics, Tufts University, 1976, 1977
- Phi Beta Kappa, 1976
- Annie J. Cannon Award in Astronomy, 1990
- Fellow, American Physical Society, 1999
- Fellow, American Women in Science, 2006
- Fellow, Connecticut Academy of Science and Engineering, 2007
- Fellow, American Academy of Arts and Sciences, 2008
- Women in Space Science Award, Adler Planetarium, 2010
- George Van Biesbroeck Prize, American Astronomical Society, 2012
- Fellow, American Association for the Advancement of Science, 2013
- Antoinette de Vaucouleurs Medal, University of Texas at Austin, 2014
- Edward A. Bouchet Leadership Award, Yale University, 2015
- Member, National Academy of Sciences, 2016
- Fellow, Johns Hopkins University Society of Scholars
- Honorary doctorate, Tufts University
- Howard R. Lamar Faculty Award, Yale University, 2018
- Fellow, American Astronomical Society, 2020 (inaugural class)
- Distinguished Career Prize, High Energy Astrophysics Division, American Astronomical Society, 2023 (inaugural recipient)
- Residency, Bellagio Center, Rockefeller Foundation, 2023
