= Joan T. Schmelz =

Professor of physics

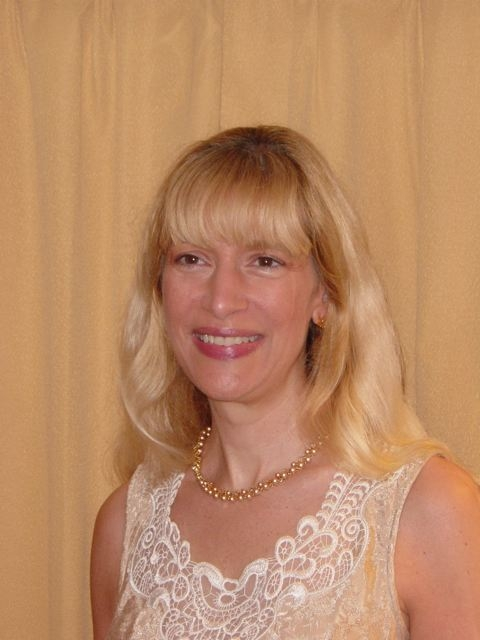
- Education: Rensselaer Polytechnic Institute (BS, MS); Pennsylvania State University (PhD)
- Scientific career
- Fields: Heliophysics
- Workplaces: University of Memphis, NASA, Rhodes College, National Science Foundation, Universities Space Research Association (USRA)
- Thesis: Investigations of Extragalactic Hydroxyl (1987)

Joan T. Schmelz is the associate director for science and public outreach at the Stratospheric Observatory for Infrared Astronomy (SOFIA) for the Universities Space Research Association (USRA). Previously, Schmelz was the deputy director of Arecibo Observatory and director of USRA Operations at Arecibo from 2015 to 2018. Before joining USRA, Schmelz was an NSF program director in the Astronomical Sciences Division, where she oversaw the Astronomy & Astrophysics Postdoctoral Fellowship program, and a professor of physics at the University of Memphis from 1996 to 2017. Schmelz's research focus is heliophysics, specifically investigating the coronal heating problem as well as the properties and dynamics of the solar atmosphere. She uses spectroscopic and image data in the X-ray and ultraviolet wavelength ranges obtained from NASA satellites and rockets. She has published over 80 refereed scientific journal articles and authored three books.

Schmelz was the chair of the American Astronomical Society's (AAS's) Committee on the Status of Women in Astronomy for 6 years (two terms) and has been the vice president of the AAS since June 2018. In December 2015, Schmelz was named by the scientific journal Nature as one of the ten people who mattered in 2015 because of her significant work as a voice for women in science, specifically because of her behind-the-scenes efforts to expose sexual harassment in science.

== Education and career ==
Joan T. Schmelz obtained her bachelor's degree in physics at Rensselaer Polytechnic Institute in 1980 and stayed for an additional two years to complete a master's degree in physics. Her master's thesis was titled "Variability in T Tauri Stars". During her time as a master's student, she won the physics department award for outstanding teaching. She then attended Pennsylvania State University, completing a PhD in astronomy with her dissertation "Investigations of extragalactic hydroxyl".

After completing her PhD, Schmelz worked at NASA's Goddard Space Flight Center where she was part of the operations team for the Solar Maximum Mission Satellite. She worked at NASA for five years before working as an assistant professor at Rhodes College. She held this position for four years before moving to the University of Memphis.

At the University of Memphis, Schmelz is the director of the solar physics lab. To study the coronal heating problem, her lab uses data from the Solar EUV Research Telescope and Spectrograph (SERTS) instrument, SOHO, TRACE and Yohkoh. She is also a frequent visitor to the Harvard-Smithsonian Center for Astrophysics and was a program officer for the National Science Foundation's Division of Astronomical Sciences.

Joan Schmelz was the deputy director of Arecibo Observatory in Puerto Rico and is now the associate director for science and public outreach at the Stratospheric Observatory for Infrared Astronomy (SOFIA) for the Universities Space Research Association (USRA).

== Promoting women in science ==
Since the fall of 2013, she has been the program director for the NSF's Astronomy and Astrophysics Postdoctoral Fellowships (AAPF). She also served as the chair of the American Astronomical Society's Committee on the Status of Women for two terms (a total of six years which ended in August 2015) and a contributor for the Women in Astronomy blog where she has written posts on sexual harassment, unconscious bias, patriarchy, balancing work and life, as well as many other topics relevant to women in astronomy.

In January 2014, she participated in the Northeast Conference for Undergraduate Women in Physics by giving a talk on unconscious bias at Penn State. This is a topic she frequently covers in lectures and she often recommends investigating the origins of patriarchy (for example, Merlin Stone's 'When God Was A Woman') to understand the small numbers of women in science.

Besides participating in the Conference for Undergraduate Women in Physics, she has given many invited talks at Caltech, JPL, NASA Goddard Space Flight Center, UT Austin, Space Telescope, the University of Maryland, MIT, the National Science Foundation, and NASA headquarters on Women in Science.

Schmelz plays an active role, assisting young women astronomers seeking guidance after facing sexual harassment and other forms of harassment within astronomy. "There's no office that will keep a confidential complaint [regarding sexual harassment] on file until, for example, they get a second confidential complaint from another person. That's one of the things I’d like to see going forward. The Committee on the Status of Women in Astronomy had been acting like that, and I had been acting like that in a very informal way." Regarding Geoff Marcy's sexual harassment complaints and resignation from Berkeley, Schmelz was quoted in the New York Times: "This should put sexual harassers on notice: No one is too big to fail".

Schmelz was named as one of the top ten people who mattered in 2015 by the journal Nature for her significant work as a voice for women in science, specifically because of her behind-the-scenes efforts to expose sexual harassment in science.

== Discrimination lawsuit ==
In 2015, married couple James Richardson and Elizabeth Sternke, both astronomers, alleged that Schmelz discriminated against them during her deputy directorship at Arecibo Observatory because of their age and because Richardson is legally blind. The US Equal Employment Opportunity Commission (EEOC), which investigates workplace bias, found Schmelz's behavior toward Richardson included "direct discriminatory age-based comments," and that the couple was wrongfully terminated as a result of retaliation when Schmelz learned of their complaints. According to the lawsuit, Schmelz "marginalized and ostracized" Richardson and Sternke.
