= Abell 2597 =

Galaxy cluster in the constellation of Aquarius

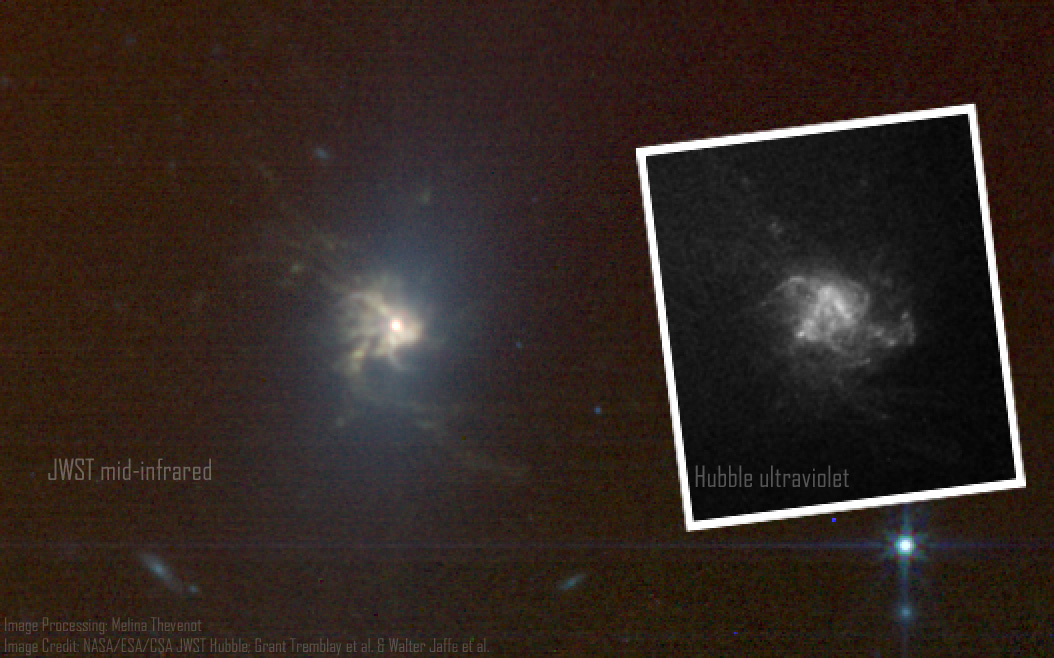
- James Webb Space Telescope image (left) in mid-infrared and Hubble Space Telescope image (right) in ultraviolet

Observation data (Epoch J2000)
- Right ascension: 23^{h} 25^{m} 19.70^{s}
- Declination: −12° 07′ 27.07″
- Redshift: 0.0852
- Distance: 307 Mpc (1,001 Mly)

Other designations
- ACO 2597, HMS 2323-1224, PSZ1 G065.33-64.85, 1RXS J232519.4-120741, BAX 351.3252-12.1083, 2MAXI J2324-121, RBS 2002, [DBG99] 125, ClG 2322.7-1224, MCXC J2325.3-1207, RXC J2325.3-1207, [F81] 432

Abell 2597 is a galaxy cluster located about a billion light years from Earth in the constellation of Aquarius. It is a giant elliptical galaxy that is surrounded by a sprawling cluster of other galaxies. In 2018, the National Radio Astronomy Observatory (NRAO) captured cosmic weather event using the Atacama Large Millimeter/submillimeter Array (ALMA) that has never been seen before - a cluster of towering intergalactic gas clouds raining in on the supermassive black hole at the center of the huge galaxy. The black hole draws in vast store of cold molecular gas and sprays it back again in an ongoing cycle so that it resembles a gigantic fountain.

== Gallery ==
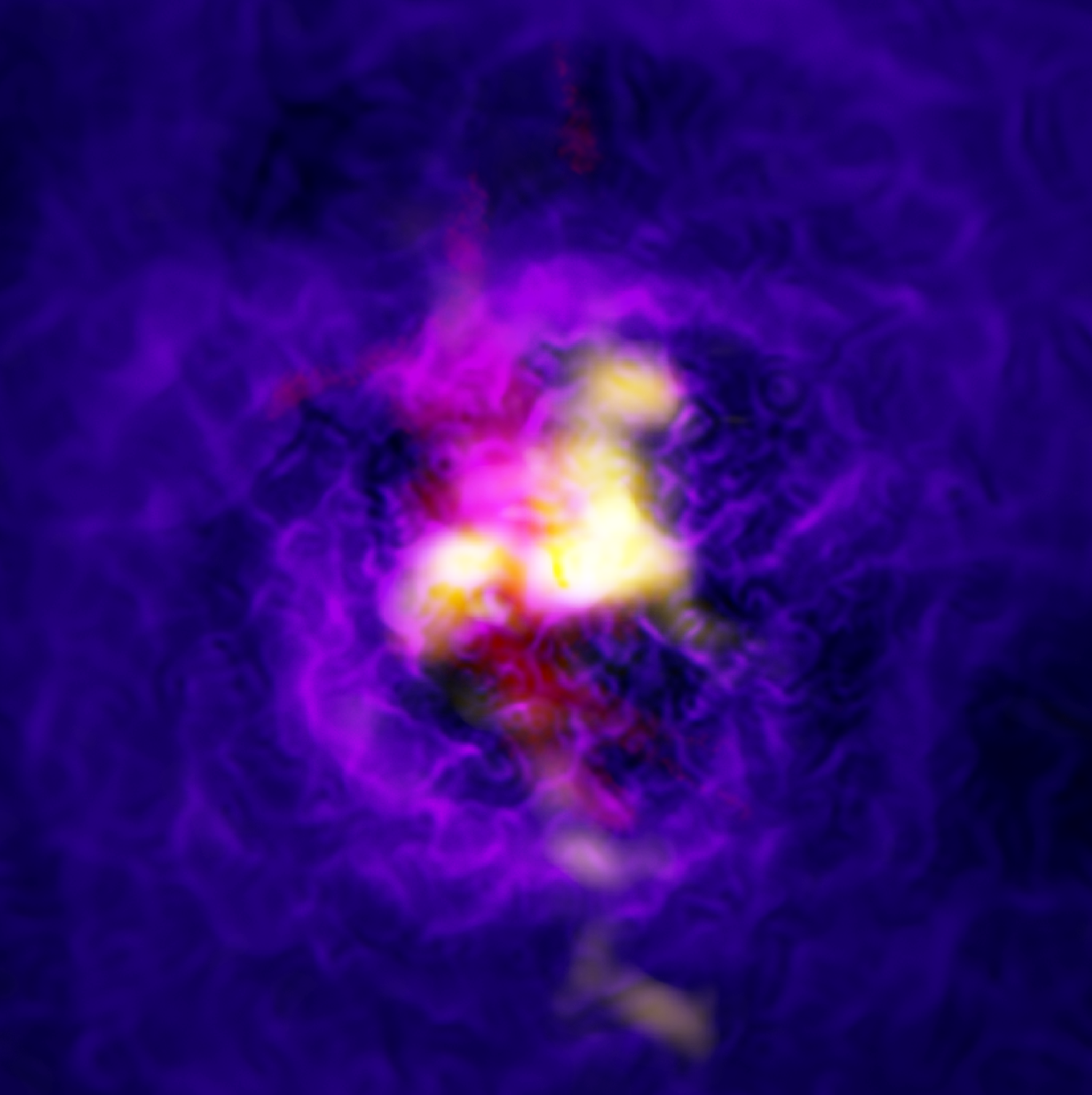
Composite image of Chandra (blue), ALMA (yellow) and MUSE (red) data showing the fountain-like flow of gas.

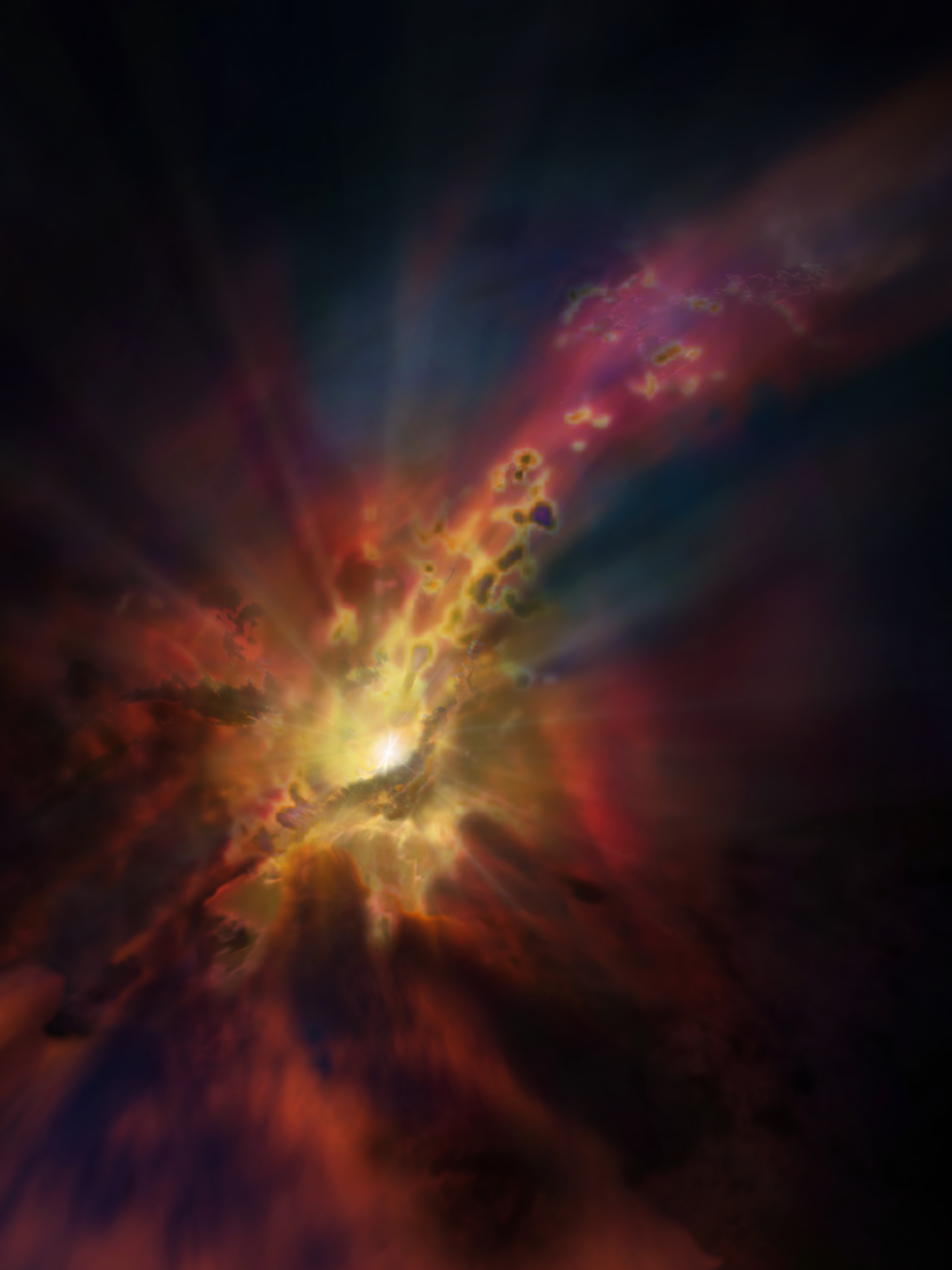
Artist’s concept showing condensing clouds of cold molecular gas around Abell 2597

== See also ==
- Abell catalogue
- Constellation of Aquarius
