= Stefi Baum =

American-Canadian astronomer (born 1958)

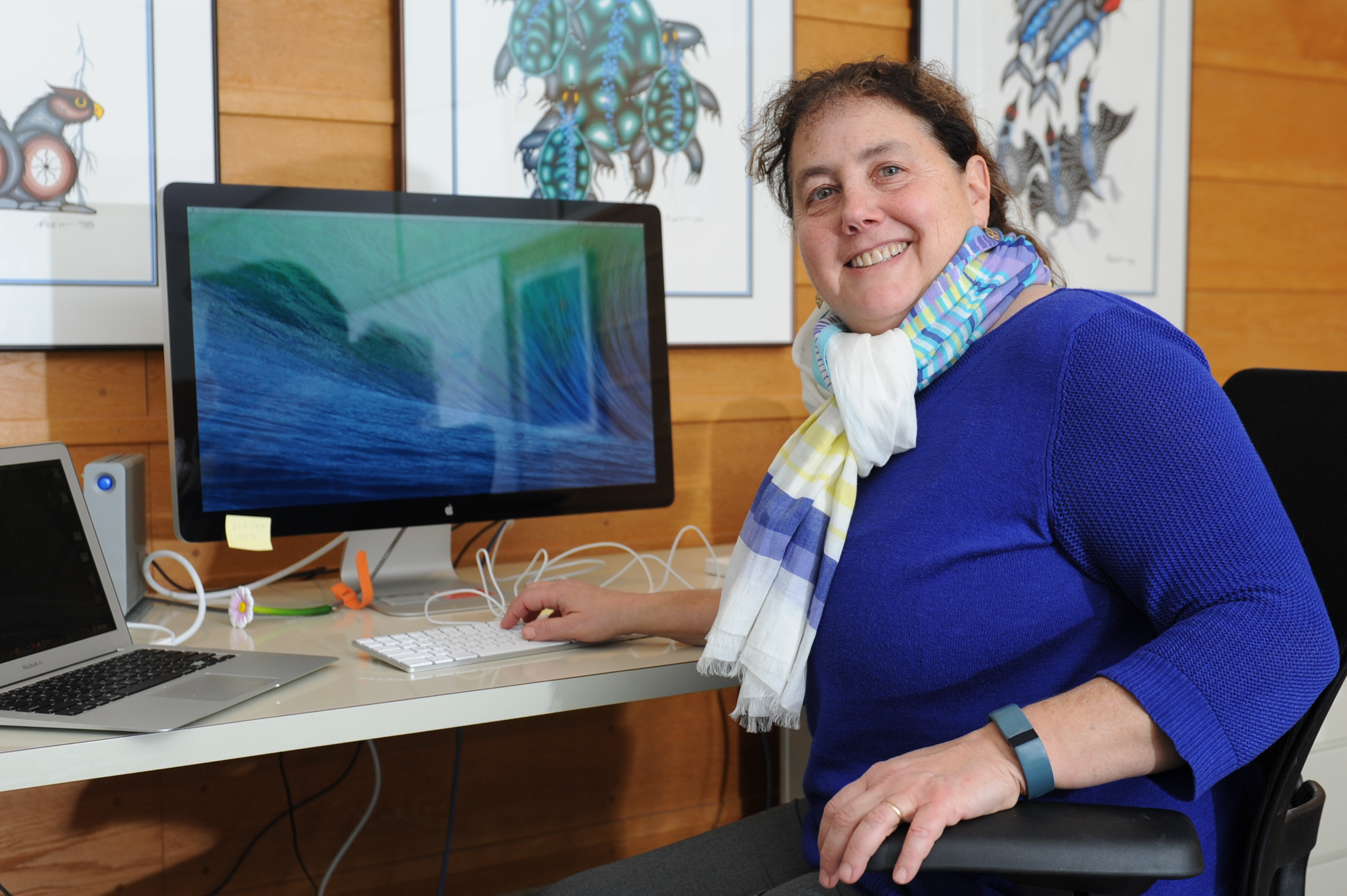
- Stefi Baum at her desk
- Born: December 11, 1958 (age 67); Chicago, Illinois, U.S.
- Education: Harvard University (BA); University of Maryland (PhD)
- Known for: Radio galaxies and active galactic nuclei; Space Telescope Imaging Spectrograph; Hubble Space Telescope data systems
- Awards: Annie Jump Cannon Award in Astronomy (1993); AAS Legacy Fellow (2020); AAAS Fellow (2017); Fellow of the Royal Society of Canada (2025)
- Scientific career
- Fields: Astrophysics, radio astronomy
- Workplaces: University of Manitoba; Rochester Institute of Technology; Space Telescope Science Institute

Stefi Alison Baum (born December 11, 1958) is an American-Canadian astrophysicist whose research focuses on active galactic nuclei, radio galaxies, and the role of supermassive black holes in galaxy evolution. She has published over 230 refereed papers and has been cited more than 22,000 times.

Baum spent over a decade at the Space Telescope Science Institute (STScI), where she contributed to the development and commissioning of the Space Telescope Imaging Spectrograph (STIS) for the Hubble Space Telescope and led the institute's data archive and engineering divisions. She later directed the Chester F. Carlson Center for Imaging Science at the Rochester Institute of Technology (2004–2014) and served as Dean of the Faculty of Science at the University of Manitoba (2014–2022).

Baum is a Fellow of the American Association for the Advancement of Science (2017), a Legacy Fellow of the American Astronomical Society (2020), and a Fellow of the Royal Society of Canada (2025).

== Early life and education ==
Baum was born in Chicago, Illinois, and grew up in Princeton, New Jersey, where she graduated from Princeton High School in 1976. She is the daughter of the mathematician Leonard E. Baum. Baum earned a Bachelor of Arts in physics cum laude from Harvard University in 1980 and a PhD in astronomy from the University of Maryland in 1987.

== Career ==
=== Space Telescope Science Institute (1987–2002) ===
After completing postdoctoral research at the Netherlands Foundation for Research in Astronomy in Dwingeloo (1987–1990) and a fellowship at Johns Hopkins University (1990–1991), Baum joined the Space Telescope Science Institute in Baltimore, Maryland. She served as an archive scientist (1991–1995), during which time she led the development and deployment of the Hubble Space Telescope data archive, for which she received both group and individual achievement awards from STScI in 1993.

From 1996 to 1998, Baum was branch chief of the Spectrographs Team, overseeing the commissioning and calibration of the Space Telescope Imaging Spectrograph (STIS) after its installation on Hubble during Servicing Mission 2 in 1997. She was subsequently promoted to division head of engineering and software services (1999–2002). In 1999 she received a NASA Excellence Award for her contributions to Hubble Servicing Mission 3A.

=== Science diplomacy and Rochester Institute of Technology (2002–2014) ===
In 2002, Baum was selected as a Science/Diplomacy Fellow with the United States Department of State and the American Institute of Physics, a position she held until 2004. She then joined the Rochester Institute of Technology (RIT) as director of the Chester F. Carlson Center for Imaging Science, a position she held for a decade (2004–2014). During her time at RIT, she secured over $20 million in external grants and contracts.

From September 2011 to July 2012, Baum held the Cashin Fellowship at the Radcliffe Institute for Advanced Study at Harvard University.

=== University of Manitoba (2014–present) ===
In October 2014, Baum joined the University of Manitoba as Dean of the Faculty of Science and Professor of Physics and Astronomy. She served as dean until 2022 and remains a professor of physics and astronomy at the university. In this role, she has been involved in the development of a virtual radio astronomy data centre as part of a Canada Foundation for Innovation-funded collaboration with the University of Toronto and other Canadian institutions.

== Research ==
Baum's research centres on the interplay between supermassive black holes, active galactic nuclei (AGN), and their host galaxies. Working frequently with collaborator Christopher P. O'Dea, she has studied how relativistic jets from supermassive black holes interact with the surrounding interstellar medium, driving gas outflows and influencing star formation on galactic scales. Her work has addressed several major topics in extragalactic astrophysics, including the nature of compact steep spectrum (CSS) and gigahertz-peaked spectrum (GPS) radio sources, the Fanaroff–Riley classification of radio galaxies, jet-triggered star formation, and feedback processes in clusters of galaxies.

In addition to her astrophysics work, Baum has contributed to the development of image-processing and statistical algorithms for functional magnetic resonance imaging (fMRI) applied to the diagnosis of schizophrenia.

== Honours and awards ==
- 1993 – Annie Jump Cannon Award in Astronomy, American Astronomical Society
- 1999 – NASA Excellence Award, Hubble Space Telescope Servicing Mission 3A
- 2002–2003 – American Institute of Physics–US State Department Science Diplomacy Fellowship
- 2017 – Elected Fellow of the American Association for the Advancement of Science
- 2020 – Elected Legacy Fellow, American Astronomical Society
- 2025 – Elected Fellow, Royal Society of Canada
