= Henrietta Hill Swope =

American astronomer (1902–1980)

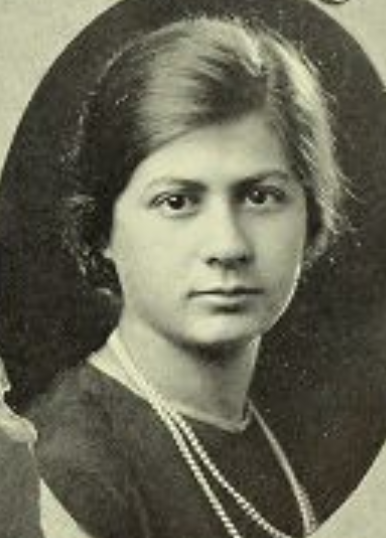
- Henrietta Swope, from the 1925 yearbook of Barnard College
- Born: October 26, 1902; St. Louis, Missouri
- Died: November 24, 1980 (aged 78); Los Angeles, California
- Education: Barnard College (BA); Radcliffe College (MA)
- Known for: Distances to Galaxies
- Awards: Annie Jump Cannon Award in Astronomy (1968)
- Scientific career
- Fields: Astronomy
- Workplaces: Carnegie Institution for Science; Harvard College Observatory

Henrietta Hill Swope (October 26, 1902 – November 24, 1980) was an American astronomer who studied variable stars. In particular, she measured the period–luminosity relation for Cepheid stars, which are bright variable stars whose periods of variability relate directly to their intrinsic luminosities. Their measured periods can therefore be related to their distances and used to measure the size of the Milky Way and distances to other galaxies.

== Personal life ==
She was the daughter of Mary Hill and Gerard Swope, and niece of Herbert Bayard Swope. Both of her parents taught at Hull-House in Chicago in the late 1890s, where they met. Her father had attended MIT and was an engineer. He worked for General Electric, eventually rising to be president of the company in 1922 and enabling his daughter to be independently wealthy throughout her life.

She learned of talks at Maria Mitchell Observatory while vacationing with her family on Nantucket, and took an evening class there alongside her brother. She also heard Harvard astronomer Harlow Shapley speak; eventually she would go to work with him on variable stars.

== Education ==
Swope attended Barnard College, and graduated in 1925, with an AB degree in mathematics. She only took an astronomy class, from Harold Jacoby, in her final year.

After college, she went back to Chicago and attended the School of Social Service Administration, at the University of Chicago, but only for one year.

While working with Harlow Shapley, she obtained her Masters in Astronomy in 1928 from Radcliffe College.

== Professional history ==
She learned that Dr. Shapley at Harvard was offering fellowships for women to work on finding variable stars. Swope went to work for Shapley in 1926 and began working alongside other "girls" to identify variable stars in the Milky Way. She became friends with Cecilia Payne-Gaposchkin and Adelaide Ames. She supported herself on a salary from Harvard and a stipend from her family. She became an expert on estimating magnitudes of stars from images on photographic plates.

Swope left Harvard to work for MIT's staff Radiation Laboratory in 1942. In her Oral History, she says, "...they said, 'How much were you getting [at Harvard]?' And I said, I think, $2000. That’s what they say they would pay me, what I was getting, but that was too little for them. They couldn't. So I rose fairly quickly." From 1942-1947, she worked on the LORAN navigation tables.

From 1947 until 1952, Swope taught astronomy at Barnard College and Connecticut College for Women and did research using old plates from Harvard.

In 1952, Walter Baade of the Carnegie Institution of Washington's Observatories asked her, via Martin Schwarzschild as an intermediary, to come work with him on variable stars detected in other galaxies by the new 200-inch Hale Telescope at Palomar Observatory. Although she was hired as Baade's research assistant, in the "nebular-studies" group, she worked independently even to the point of writing scientific publications with his name on them after his death. She stayed at the Carnegie Institution for the rest of her career; she officially retired in 1968.

In 1964, a paper by Baade & Swope reported the results of light curves for 275 Cepheids derived by Swope from photographic plates of the Andromeda Galaxy taken at the relatively new Hale 200-inch Telescope at Palomar Mountain. They reported a new distance to M31, given as a distance modulus of 24.25. They followed up this work in 1963 with new results of 20 Cepheids in a region of Andromeda less affected by extinction and estimated a new distance modulus of 24.20 mag.

== Legacy ==
In 1967, Swope made a donation of securities valued at $650,000 to the Carnegie Institution of Washington to develop "optical astronomical observatory facilities in the Southern Hemisphere." This gift was used for development of the site, including roads, water, and power systems, and for building a 40-inch telescope at Carnegie's Las Campanas Observatory in Chile. This telescope was named the Swope Telescope in her honor; it started operation in 1971 and is still used today. Swope also left most of her estate to Carnegie to support further Las Campanas and astronomical research at the institution more generally.

Henrietta Hill Swope died at the age of 78 in Pasadena in California.

== Awards and honors ==
- Annie J. Cannon Award in 1968
- Asteroid 2168 Swope is named in her honor.
- Barnard Distinguished Alumnae Award, 1975
- The Swope Telescope at the Las Campanas Observatory in Chile is named in her honor.
- Honorary PhD, 1975, University of Basel, Switzerland
- Barnard College Medal of Distinction, 1980
