= Sommers–Bausch Observatory =

Astronomical observatory in Colorado, US

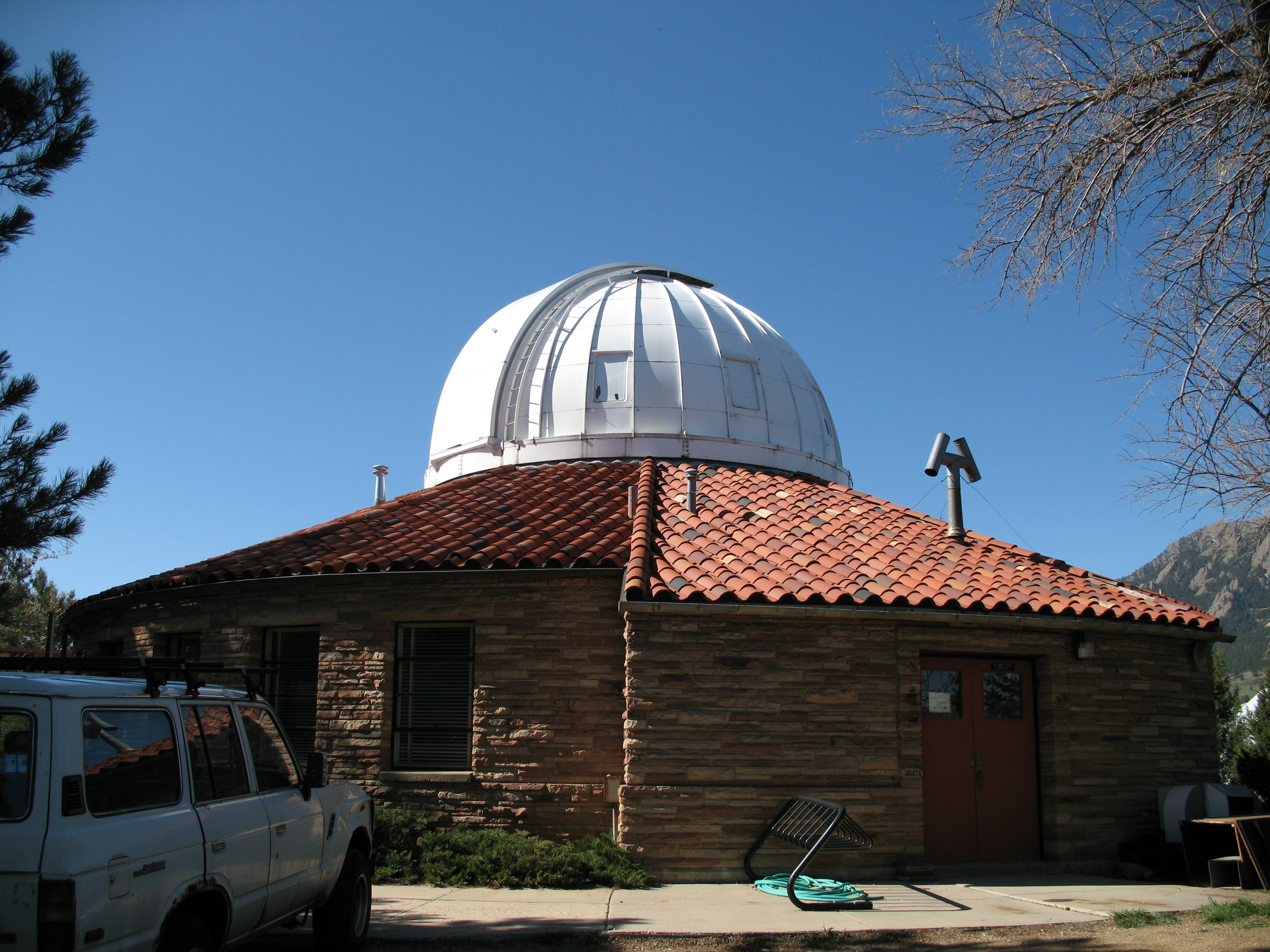
- Organization: University of Colorado Boulder
- Observatory code: 463
- Location: Boulder, Colorado
- Coordinates: 40°00′13.4″N 105°15′45.0″W
- Altitude: 1,653 m (5,423 ft)
- Website: sbo.colorado.edu

Telescopes
- Leto: 24" Boller and Chivens
- Artemis: 20" Planewave CDK
- Apollo: 20" Planewave CDK

Sommers–Bausch Observatory (SBO) is an astronomical observatory operated by the University of Colorado, Boulder on its main campus. The building was initially completed in 1953 and named after Elmer E. Sommers and Carl L. Bausch.

It is operated by the university's Department of Astrophysical and Planetary Sciences (APS), which primarily utilizes the facilities and equipment of the observatory for teaching as well as some research. Telescopes include two 20" Planewave CDK telescopes on Software Bisque Taurus 500 encoder mounts, a 24" Boller and Chivens Cassegrain reflectors, and a 10-inch aperture heliostat (solar telescope). The observatory also possesses multiple smaller telescopes and ancillary equipment. The observatory also houses the lab classroom and the computer lab for the APS department.

== History ==
In 1949, the University of Colorado received a bequest of $49,054 from the estate of Mayme Sommers in memory of her husband Elmer E. Sommers. These funds were used to construct the observatory, which was built in an adapted rural Italian style to match buildings on the campus. Construction began in 1950 and was completed in 1953, which was delayed because of manpower and material shortages due to the Korean War. The building was dedicated on August 27, 1953, during the 89th meeting of the American Astronomical Society. The 17 foot, 10-inch Bausch refractor, originally from the Bausch & Lomb building in Rochester, New York, was installed in the dome the same year. In 1957, the Department of Astro-Geophysics, now Astrophysical & Planetary Sciences, was formed and used Sommers–Bausch Observatory as its research and teaching facility. Harvard University’s High Altitude Observatory also had office space inside the Observatory, which was then moved to the new HAO Building constructed next to the Observatory in 1960.

In 1973, the current 24-inch reflector telescope was installed in place of the previous 10-inch Bausch & Lomb refractor. As a result of the decrease in length of the telescope, modifications had to be made to the interior of the dome. The 10-inch lens of the Bausch telescope was fitted onto the heliostat on top of the Duane Physics Building on the University’s campus. The telescope itself was displayed in the lobby of Fiske Planetarium until 2013 when it was replaced by the Fritz Star Projector.

In 1981, an addition was built to provide space for a new observing deck that hosted an 18-inch teaching telescope along with four darkrooms, a laboratory, offices and a workshop. The heliostat was also moved from Duane Physics to the new space. A permanent roll off roof was installed in 1986 and with it also came the installation of an extra 18-inch teaching telescope. 1986 was also the year that SBO received CCD technology to fit onto their telescopes. The Observatory was one of the first university observatories to acquire the technology, with the Observatory’s detector in particular being designed and built for the Hubble Space Telescope and Galileo mission. This greatly increased the research use for the Observatory given the 60X sensitivity. In 1989, the Astrophysical & Planetary Sciences Department introduced the lab/lecture Introduction to Astronomy courses, which greatly benefited from the new technology and expanded the involvement of undergraduate students.

The Observatory was renovated again in 1997, converting two of the darkrooms into a computer lab that currently hosts 38 computers. The lab is used by undergraduates, graduates, and groups such as the Summer Science Program.

The original dome slit was replaced in 2005 by Ash-Dome. In 2006, the original lens for the Bausch & Lomb telescope cracked beyond repair due to constant heating and cooling from use in the heliostat. The 18-inch and 16-inch teaching telescopes on the Observing Deck were replaced by two 20-inch Planewave CDK telescopes in 2017, named Artemis and Apollo.

== Visiting the observatory ==
The observatory hosts free public open houses on Friday nights, hosted by students and faculty. In addition to the open houses, the observatory is open to the public during astronomical events such as lunar eclipses.

== See also ==
- List of observatories
