= Nevidzany =

Nevidzany may refer to several villages in Slovakia:

- Nevidzany, Zlaté Moravce District
- Nevidzany, Prievidza District
