= Hosťovce =

Hosťovce may refer to several places in Slovakia.

- Hosťovce, Košice-okolie District
- Hosťovce, Zlaté Moravce District
