= Ladice =

Ladice Barslédec
- Municipality
- Flag

- Location of Ladice in the Nitra Region Location of Ladice in Slovakia
- Coordinates: 48°23′47″N 18°15′38″E
- Country: Slovakia
- Region: Nitra Region
- District: Zlaté Moravce District
- First mentioned: 1253

Area
  - Total: 11.64 km^{2} (4.49 sq mi)
- Elevation: 197 m (646 ft)

Population (2025)
  - Total: 728
- Time zone: UTC+1 (CET)
  - Summer (DST): UTC+2 (CEST)
- Postal code: 951 77
- Area code: +421 37
- Vehicle registration plate (until 2022): ZM
- Website: www.ladice.sk

Ladice (Hungarian: Barslédec) is a village and municipality in Zlaté Moravce District of the Nitra Region, in western-central Slovakia.

== History ==
The village was first mentioned in historical records in 1075.

== Geography ==
The municipality lies at an altitude of 197 metres (646 ft) and covers an area of 11.64 km^{2} (4.49 sq mi) (2025).

== Population ==
Population statistic (10 years)
Year	1995	2005	2015	2025
Count	816	786	745	728
Difference		−3.67%	−5.21%	−2.28%

Population statistic
Year	2024	2025
Count	719	728
Difference		+1.25%

It has a population of 728 people (31 December 2025).

=== Ethnicity ===
Census 2021 (1+ %)
Ethnicity	Number	Fraction
Slovak	554	73.08%
Hungarian	195	25.72%
Not found out	48	6.33%
Total	758	

In year 2021 was 758 people by ethnicity 554 as Slovak, 195 as Hungarian, 48 as Not found out, 3 as Czech, 1 as Ukrainian and 1 as Rusyn.

Note on population: The difference values of population numbers in the table "Population statistic" and in the sections "Ethnicity" & "Religion" is caused by the use of various statistical methods.

=== Religion ===
Census 2021 (1+ %)
Religion	Number	Fraction
Roman Catholic Church	574	75.73%
None	111	14.64%
Not found out	50	6.6%
Total	758	

In year 2021 was 758 people by religion 574 from Roman Catholic Church, 111 from None, 50 from Not found out, 7 from Paganism and natural spirituality, 5 from Christian Congregations in Slovakia, 2 from Eastern Orthodox Church, 2 from Greek Catholic Church, 2 from Evangelical Church, 2 from Church of Jesus Christ of Latter-day Saints, 2 from Buddhism and 1 from United Methodist Church.
