= Martin nad Žitavou =

Martin nad Žitavou Zsitvaszentmárton
- Municipality
- Flag

- Location of Martin nad Žitavou in the Nitra Region Location of Martin nad Žitavou in Slovakia
- Coordinates: 48.40°N 18.36°E
- Country: Slovakia
- Region: Nitra Region
- District: Zlaté Moravce District
- First mentioned: 1272

Area
  - Total: 4.33 km^{2} (1.67 sq mi)
- Elevation: 196 m (643 ft)

Population (2025)
  - Total: 584
- Time zone: UTC+1 (CET)
  - Summer (DST): UTC+2 (CEST)
- Postal code: 953 01
- Area code: +421 37
- Vehicle registration plate (until 2022): ZM
- Website: www.martinnadzitavou.sk

Martin nad Žitavou (Hungarian: Zsitvaszentmárton) is a village and municipality in Zlaté Moravce District of the Nitra Region, in western-central Slovakia.

== History ==
In historical records the village was first mentioned in 1272.

== Geography ==
The municipality lies at an altitude of 196 metres (643 ft) and covers an area of 4.33 km^{2} (1.67 sq mi) (2025).

== Population ==
Population statistic (10 years)
Year	1995	2005	2015	2025
Count	509	532	531	584
Difference		+4.51%	−0.18%	+9.98%

Population statistic
Year	2024	2025
Count	583	584
Difference		+0.17%

It has a population of 584 people (31 December 2025).

=== Ethnicity ===
Census 2021 (1+ %)
Ethnicity	Number	Fraction
Slovak	522	97.57%
Not found out	14	2.61%
Total	535	

In year 2021 was 535 people by ethnicity 522 as Slovak, 14 as Not found out, 4 as Other, 1 as Romani, 1 as German and 1 as Hungarian.

Note on population: The difference values of population numbers in the table "Population statistic" and in the sections "Ethnicity" & "Religion" is caused by the use of various statistical methods.

=== Religion ===
Census 2021 (1+ %)
Religion	Number	Fraction
Roman Catholic Church	444	82.99%
None	73	13.64%
Not found out	13	2.43%
Total	535	

In year 2021 was 535 people by religion 444 from Roman Catholic Church, 73 from None, 13 from Not found out, 3 from Ad hoc movements, 1 from Eastern Orthodox Church and 1 from Evangelical Church.
