= Obyce =

Obyce Ebedec
- Municipality
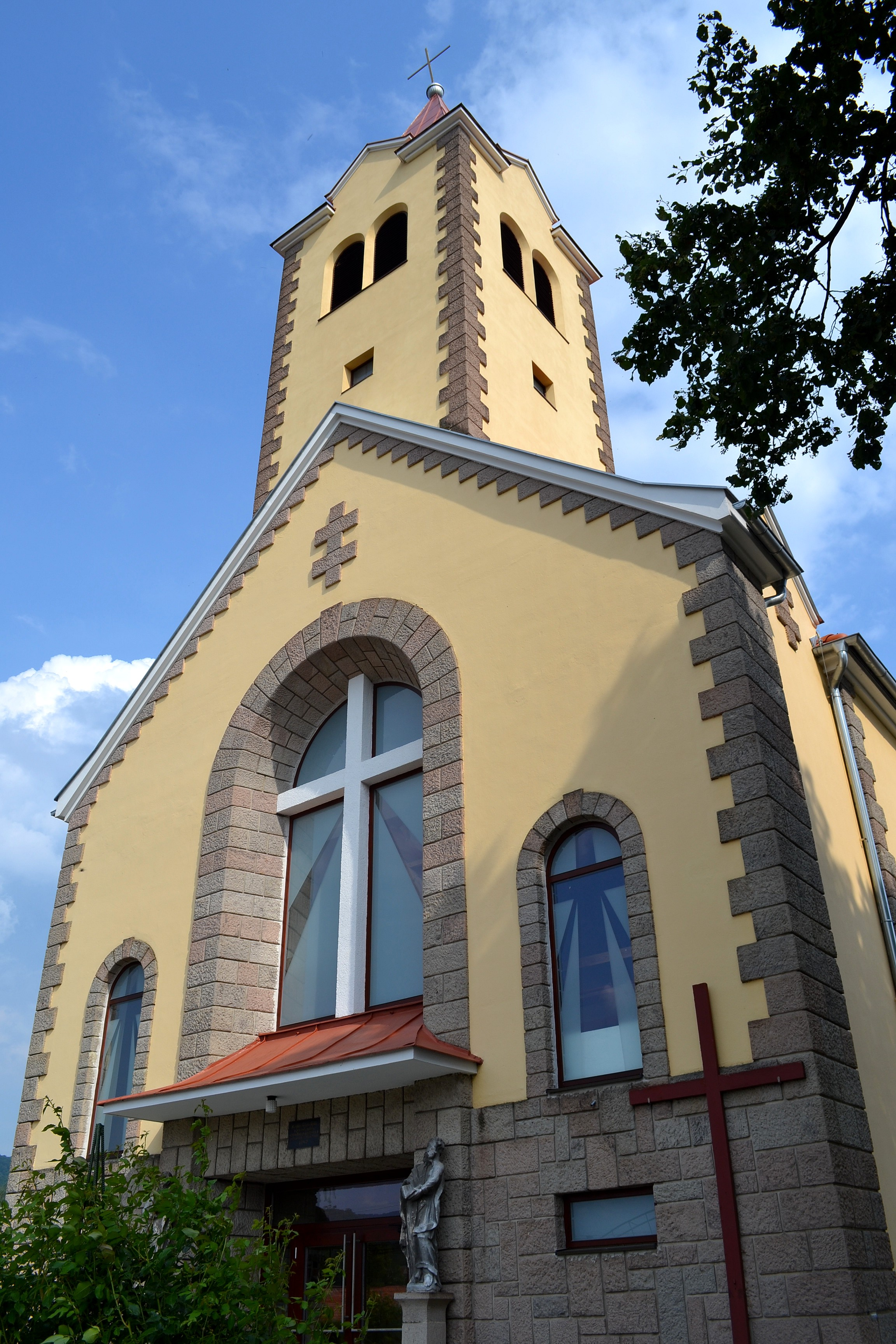

- Flag

- Location of Obyce in the Nitra Region Location of Obyce in Slovakia
- Coordinates: 48.43°N 18.45°E
- Country: Slovakia
- Region: Nitra Region
- District: Zlaté Moravce District
- First mentioned: 1322

Area
  - Total: 31.26 km^{2} (12.07 sq mi)
- Elevation: 248 m (814 ft)

Population (2025)
  - Total: 1,442
- Time zone: UTC+1 (CET)
  - Summer (DST): UTC+2 (CEST)
- Postal code: 951 95
- Area code: +421 37
- Vehicle registration plate (until 2022): ZM
- Website: www.obyce.eu

Obyce (Hungarian: Ebedec) is a village and municipality in Zlaté Moravce District of the Nitra Region, in western-central Slovakia.

== History ==
In historical records the village was first mentioned in 1332.

== Geography ==
The municipality lies at an altitude of 248 metres (814 ft) and covers an area of 31.26 km^{2} (12.07 sq mi) (2025).

== Population ==
Population statistic (10 years)
Year	1995	2005	2015	2025
Count	1506	1543	1522	1442
Difference		+2.45%	−1.36%	−5.25%

Population statistic
Year	2024	2025
Count	1460	1442
Difference		−1.23%

It has a population of 1442 people (31 December 2025).

=== Ethnicity ===
Census 2021 (1+ %)
Ethnicity	Number	Fraction
Slovak	1461	96.75%
Not found out	41	2.71%
Total	1510	

In year 2021 was 1510 people by ethnicity 1461 as Slovak, 41 as Not found out, 7 as Other, 6 as Czech, 2 as Austrian, 1 as Turkish, 1 as Russian, 1 as Polish and 1 as Hungarian.

Note on population: The difference values of population numbers in the table "Population statistic" and in the sections "Ethnicity" & "Religion" is caused by the use of various statistical methods.

=== Religion ===
Census 2021 (1+ %)
Religion	Number	Fraction
Roman Catholic Church	1271	84.17%
None	143	9.47%
Not found out	39	2.58%
Total	1510	

In year 2021 was 1510 people by religion 1271 from Roman Catholic Church, 143 from None, 39 from Not found out, 11 from Apostolic Church, 9 from Evangelical Church, 7 from Greek Catholic Church, 5 from Other and not ascertained christian church, 4 from Jehovah's Witnesses, 4 from Christian Congregations in Slovakia, 4 from Ad hoc movements, 3 from Calvinist Church, 3 from Other, 2 from Paganism and natural spirituality, 2 from Buddhism, 1 from Jewish community, 1 from Islam and 1 from Baptists Church.
