= Volkovce =

Volkovce Valkóc
- Municipality
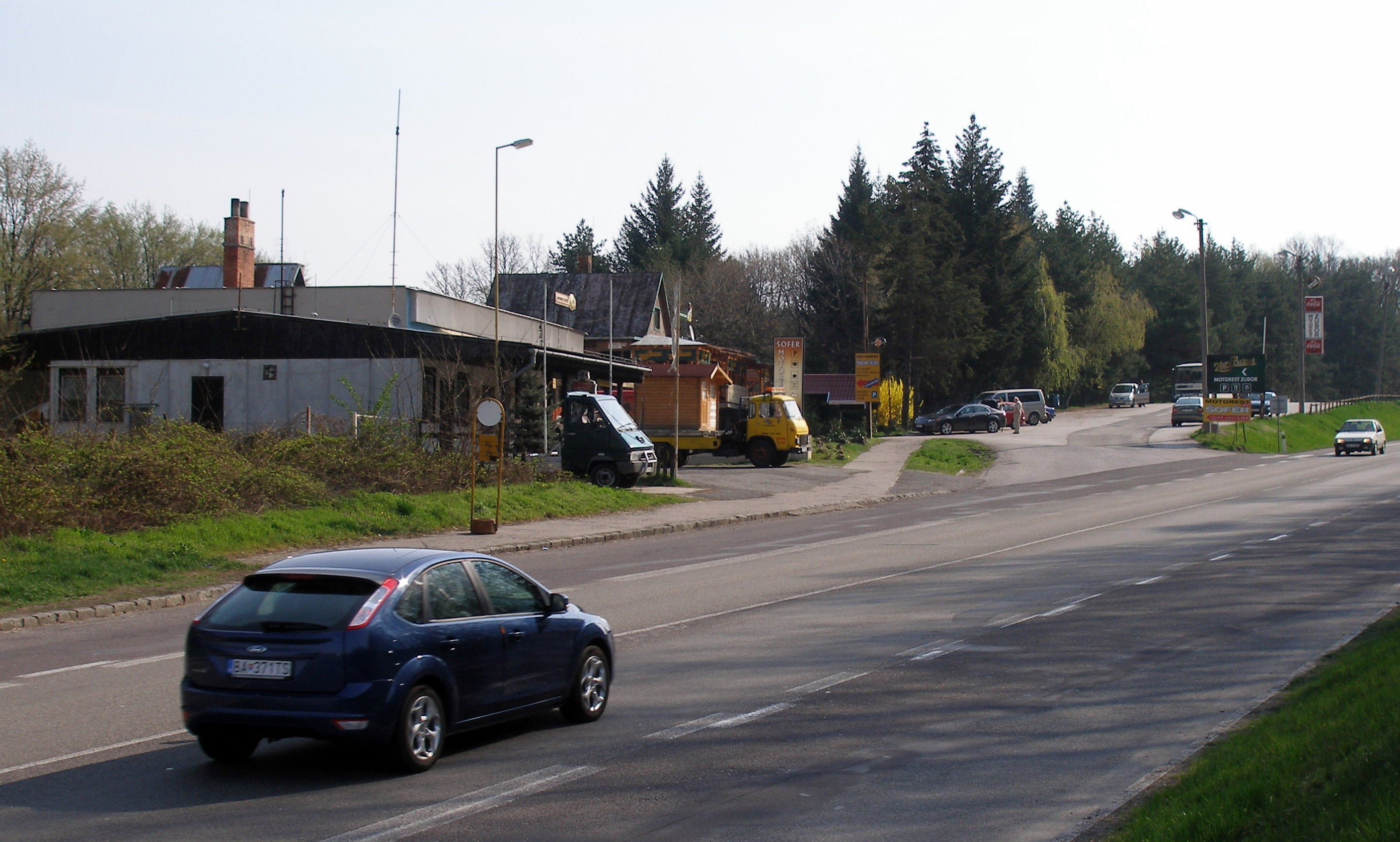

- Flag

- Location of Volkovce in the Nitra Region Location of Volkovce in Slovakia
- Coordinates: 48.33°N 18.45°E
- Country: Slovakia
- Region: Nitra Region
- District: Zlaté Moravce District
- First mentioned: 1209

Area
  - Total: 11.60 km^{2} (4.48 sq mi)
- Elevation: 205 m (673 ft)

Population (2025)
  - Total: 987
- Time zone: UTC+1 (CET)
  - Summer (DST): UTC+2 (CEST)
- Postal code: 951 87
- Area code: +421 37
- Vehicle registration plate (until 2022): ZM
- Website: www.volkovce.sk

Volkovce (Hungarian: Valkóc) is a village and municipality in Zlaté Moravce District of the Nitra Region, in western-central Slovakia.

== History ==
The earliest evidence of settlement in the area dates back to the Palaeolithic period, around 35,000 years ago. The first written mention of Volkovce is found in a document from 1275, where the village is mentioned as being a part of the Tekov Castle. In 1327 part of the village belonged to the Saint Benedict Abbey. In 1535 the village was burnt completely. In 1565 the village was one of Esztergom canonry. In the 16th and 17th centuries this area fell victim to Turkish invasion. The Závada village is first mentioned in 1629. The villages of Volkovce and Závada first merged in 1924-1931, and finally in 1945. Part of the village also includes the village (former farmlands) Slance and Olichov.

=== 1275 ===
The first written reference to Volkovce is found in a document from 1275. It was written by master Ladislav an official from Ostrihom canonry during the reign of king Ladislav IV. The document confirms the exchange of land estates between master Štefan, the Tekov region Zhupan (Zhupan = a title of various positions among South Slavic peoples, at the head of several types of units called ŽUPA) and the castle's lords Dom, the son of George and his brothers. All the attending parties declared that they “give and assign estates called Mohala and Wolkouch”, that have fallen into the castle's territory and therefore are better, preferable and more beneficial to be exchanged for other estates that belong to them”.

Volkovce did not get into this document as a newly erected village, but in connection with an economic dispute of its residing owners. It can be assumed that the village was probably well established and belonged under the territory of Tekov castle.

=== 1327 ===
Another interesting reference to Volkovce is dated 1327. It is also a record about judicial dispute between an Abbot of Saint Benedict Abbacy, who owned a part of estate in the region of Volkovce and Pavol also named as Literate from Volkovce and his brothers. According to the document these tenants wanted to withdraw from the influence of the abbot and claim ownership of the land they had rented from him. However, the abbot was able to prove that the predecessors of Pavol acquired their lands from the previous abbot as tenants, therefore the estates in dispute continued to be the property of abbacy. Since Pavol lost his case, he was forced to pay the court costs – 12 marks of silver.

== Geography ==
The municipality lies at an altitude of 205 metres (673 ft) and covers an area of 11.60 km^{2} (4.48 sq mi) (2025).

Volkovce lies in the Danube highlands, represented by Hron highlands on the southern slopes of Pohronský Inovec in the Valley of the Bočovka Stream.

== Population ==
Population statistic (10 years)
| Year | 1995 | 2005 | 2015 | 2025 |
|---|---|---|---|---|
| Count | 1038 | 1017 | 1015 | 987 |
| Difference | | −2.02% | −0.19% | −2.75% |

Population statistic
| Year | 2024 | 2025 |
|---|---|---|
| Count | 1006 | 987 |
| Difference | | −1.88% |

It has a population of 987 people (31 December 2025).

=== Ethnicity ===
Census 2021 (1+ %)
| Ethnicity | Number | Fraction |
|---|---|---|
| Slovak | 988 | 97.53% |
| Total | 1013 | |

In year 2021 was 1013 people by ethnicity 988 as Slovak, 10 as Hungarian, 6 as Not found out, 5 as Ukrainian, 2 as Czech, 2 as Russian, 2 as Other, 1 as Vietnamese, 1 as Romani and 1 as Romanian.

Note on population: The difference values of population numbers in the table "Population statistic" and in the sections "Ethnicity" & "Religion" is caused by the use of various statistical methods.

=== Religion ===
Census 2021 (1+ %)
| Religion | Number | Fraction |
|---|---|---|
| Roman Catholic Church | 805 | 79.47% |
| None | 157 | 15.5% |
| Not found out | 14 | 1.38% |
| Evangelical Church | 13 | 1.28% |
| Total | 1013 | |

In year 2021 was 1013 people by religion 805 from Roman Catholic Church, 157 from None, 14 from Not found out, 13 from Evangelical Church, 6 from Eastern Orthodox Church, 5 from Ad hoc movements, 4 from Other, 4 from Greek Catholic Church, 3 from Christian Congregations in Slovakia, 1 from Calvinist Church and 1 from Jehovah's Witnesses.
