= Malé Vozokany =

Malé Vozokany Kisvezekény
- Municipality
- Flag

- Location of Malé Vozokany in the Nitra Region Location of Malé Vozokany in Slovakia
- Coordinates: 48.31°N 18.40°E
- Country: Slovakia
- Region: Nitra Region
- District: Zlaté Moravce District
- First mentioned: 1295

Area
  - Total: 5.86 km^{2} (2.26 sq mi)
- Elevation: 176 m (577 ft)

Population (2025)
  - Total: 367
- Time zone: UTC+1 (CET)
  - Summer (DST): UTC+2 (CEST)
- Postal code: 951 82
- Area code: +421 37
- Vehicle registration plate (until 2022): ZM
- Website: www.malevozokany.sk

Malé Vozokany (Hungarian: Kisvezekény) is a village and municipality in Zlaté Moravce District of the Nitra Region, in western-central Slovakia.

== History ==
In historical records the village was first mentioned in 1209.

== Geography ==
The municipality lies at an altitude of 176 metres (577 ft) and covers an area of 5.86 km^{2} (2.26 sq mi) (2025).

== Population ==
Population statistic (10 years)
Year	1995	2005	2015	2025
Count	304	324	264	367
Difference		+6.57%	−18.51%	+39.01%

Population statistic
Year	2024	2025
Count	359	367
Difference		+2.22%

It has a population of 367 people (31 December 2025).

=== Ethnicity ===
Census 2021 (1+ %)
Ethnicity	Number	Fraction
Slovak	323	96.99%
Not found out	7	2.1%
Ukrainian	5	1.5%
Total	333	

In year 2021 was 333 people by ethnicity 323 as Slovak, 7 as Not found out, 5 as Ukrainian, 1 as Romani and 1 as Hungarian.

Note on population: The difference values of population numbers in the table "Population statistic" and in the sections "Ethnicity" & "Religion" is caused by the use of various statistical methods.

=== Religion ===
Census 2021 (1+ %)
Religion	Number	Fraction
Roman Catholic Church	279	83.78%
None	38	11.41%
Not found out	6	1.8%
Ad hoc movements	4	1.2%
Total	333	

In year 2021 was 333 people by religion 279 from Roman Catholic Church, 38 from None, 6 from Not found out, 4 from Ad hoc movements, 1 from Calvinist Church, 1 from Eastern Orthodox Church, 1 from Paganism and natural spirituality, 1 from Christian Congregations in Slovakia, 1 from Other and 1 from Evangelical Church.
