= Slepčany =

Village and municipality in Slovakia

Slepčany Szelepcsény
- Municipality
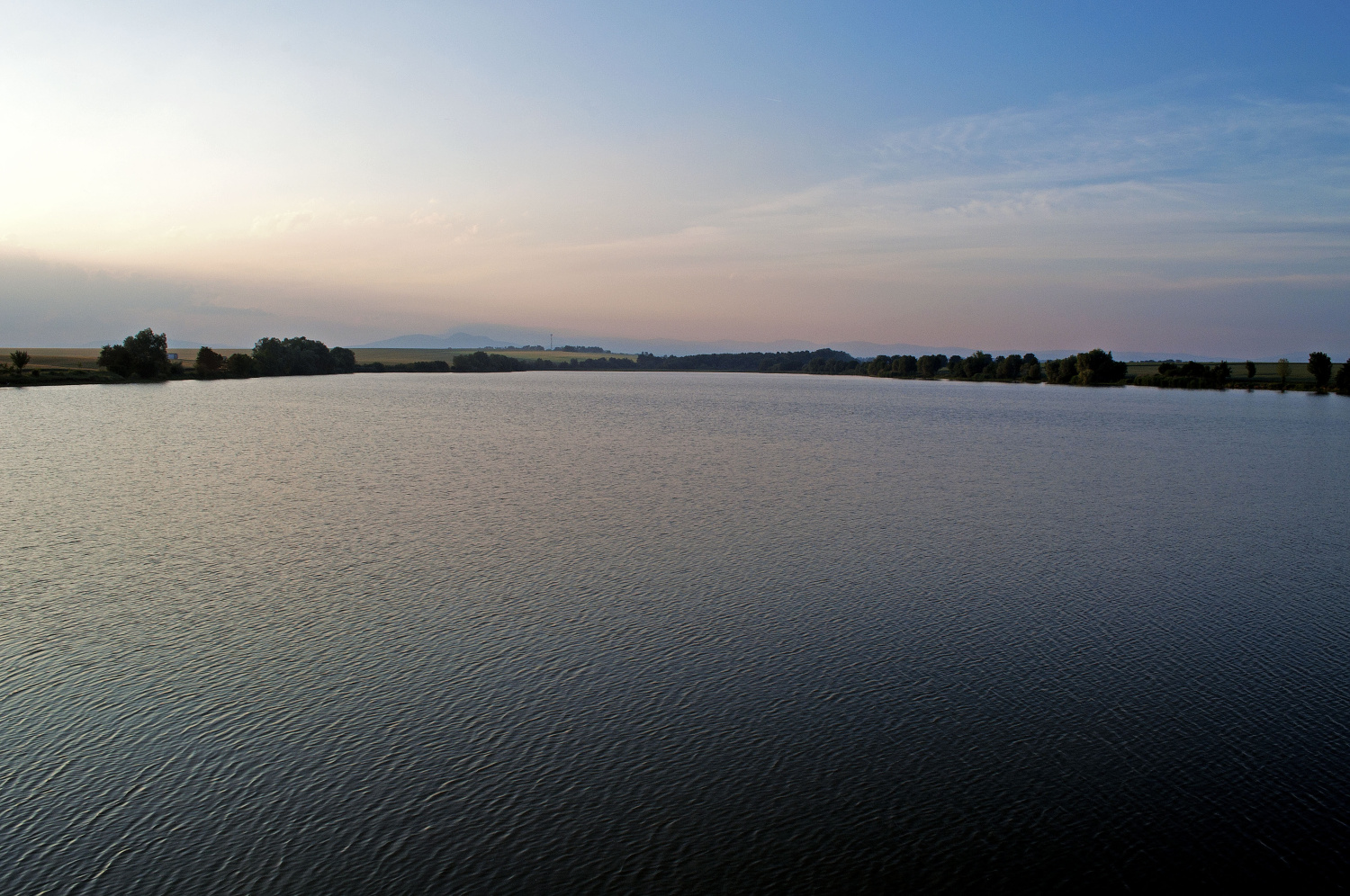
- Slepčany water reservoir

- Flag

- Location of Slepčany in the Nitra Region Location of Slepčany in Slovakia
- Coordinates: 48.32°N 18.33°E
- Country: Slovakia
- Region: Nitra Region
- District: Zlaté Moravce District
- First mentioned: 1165

Area
  - Total: 9.35 km^{2} (3.61 sq mi)
- Elevation: 163 m (535 ft)

Population (2025)
  - Total: 845
- Time zone: UTC+1 (CET)
  - Summer (DST): UTC+2 (CEST)
- Postal code: 951 52
- Area code: +421 37
- Vehicle registration plate (until 2022): ZM
- Website: www.slepcany.sk

Slepčany (Hungarian: Szelepcsény) is a village and municipality in Zlaté Moravce District of the Nitra Region, in western-central Slovakia.

== History ==
In historical records the village was first mentioned in 1165.

== Geography ==
The municipality lies at an altitude of 163 metres (535 ft) and covers an area of 9.35 km^{2} (3.61 sq mi) (2025).

== Population ==
Population statistic (10 years)
Year	1995	2005	2015	2025
Count	871	869	806	845
Difference		−0.22%	−7.24%	+4.83%

Population statistic
Year	2024	2025
Count	839	845
Difference		+0.71%

It has a population of 845 people (31 December 2025).

=== Ethnicity ===
Census 2021 (1+ %)
Ethnicity	Number	Fraction
Slovak	769	94.58%
Not found out	40	4.92%
Total	813	

In year 2021 was 813 people by ethnicity 769 as Slovak, 40 as Not found out, 5 as Czech, 5 as Hungarian, 3 as Ukrainian, 2 as Rusyn, 2 as Polish, 1 as Austrian and 1 as Other.

Note on population: The difference values of population numbers in the table "Population statistic" and in the sections "Ethnicity" & "Religion" is caused by the use of various statistical methods.

=== Religion ===
Census 2021 (1+ %)
Religion	Number	Fraction
Roman Catholic Church	673	82.78%
None	77	9.47%
Not found out	40	4.92%
Total	813	

In year 2021 was 813 people by religion 673 from Roman Catholic Church, 77 from None, 40 from Not found out, 4 from Calvinist Church, 4 from Greek Catholic Church, 3 from Evangelical Church, 3 from Apostolic Church, 2 from Eastern Orthodox Church, 2 from Paganism and natural spirituality, 2 from Other and not ascertained christian church, 1 from Christian Congregations in Slovakia, 1 from Buddhism and 1 from Ad hoc movements.
