= Neverice =

Neverice Néver
- Municipality
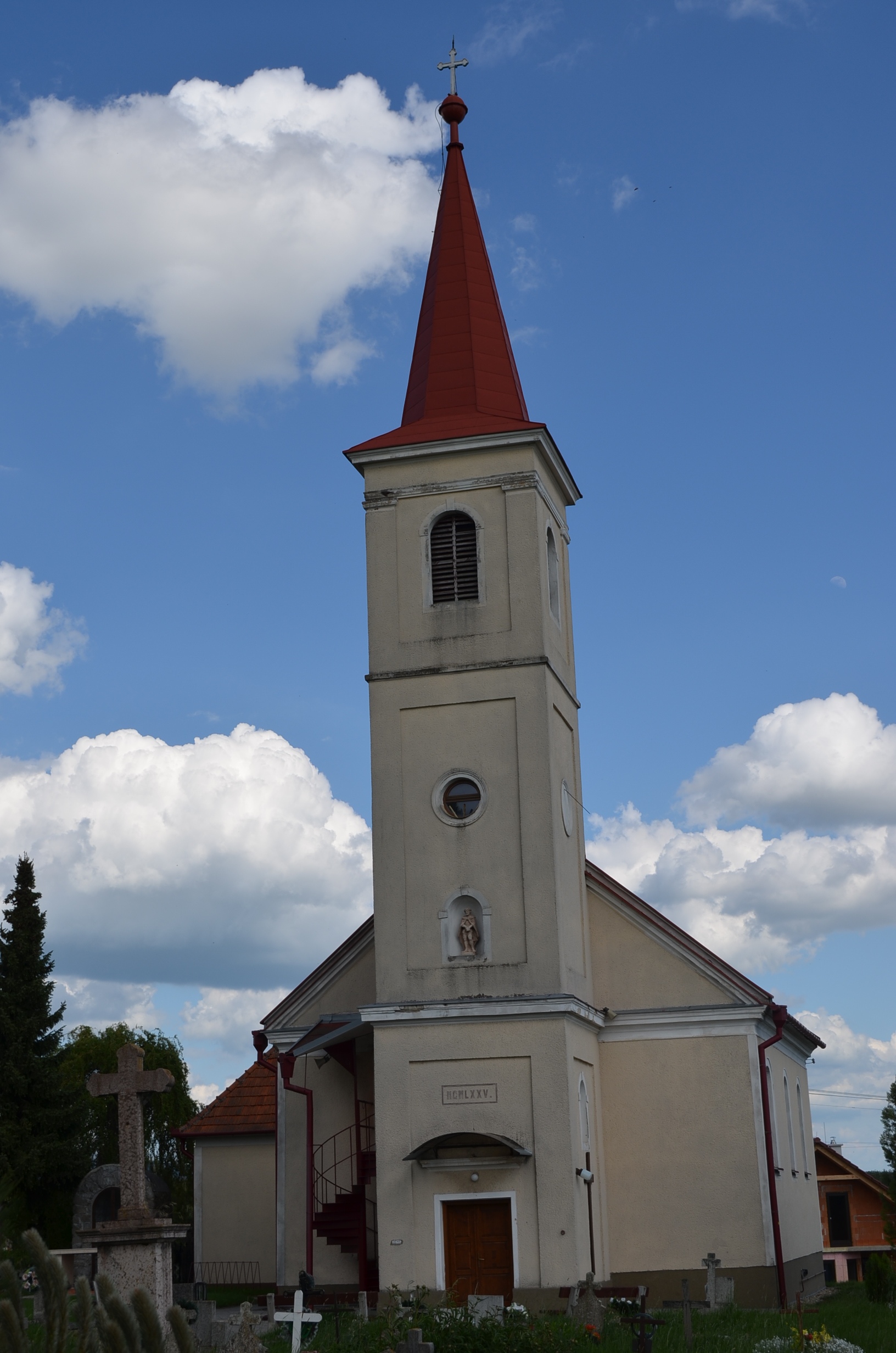

- Flag

- Location of Neverice in the Nitra Region Location of Neverice in Slovakia
- Coordinates: 48.37°N 18.27°E
- Country: Slovakia
- Region: Nitra Region
- District: Zlaté Moravce District
- First mentioned: 1275

Area
  - Total: 5.95 km^{2} (2.30 sq mi)
- Elevation: 182 m (597 ft)

Population (2025)
  - Total: 687
- Time zone: UTC+1 (CET)
  - Summer (DST): UTC+2 (CEST)
- Postal code: 951 72
- Area code: +421 37
- Vehicle registration plate (until 2022): ZM
- Website: www.neverice.sk

Neverice (Hungarian: Néver) is a village and municipality in Zlaté Moravce District of the Nitra Region, in western-central Slovakia.

== History ==
In historical records, the village was first mentioned in 1275.

== Geography ==
The municipality lies at an altitude of 182 metres (597 ft) and covers an area of 5.95 km^{2} (2.30 sq mi) (2025).

== Population ==
Population statistic (10 years)
Year	1995	2005	2015	2025
Count	656	674	684	687
Difference		+2.74%	+1.48%	+0.43%

Population statistic
Year	2024	2025
Count	677	687
Difference		+1.47%

It has a population of 687 people (31 December 2025).

=== Ethnicity ===
Census 2021 (1+ %)
Ethnicity	Number	Fraction
Slovak	674	97.39%
Not found out	16	2.31%
Total	692	

In year 2021 was 692 people by ethnicity 674 as Slovak, 16 as Not found out, 6 as Russian, 4 as Hungarian, 3 as Czech, 2 as Other, 2 as English and 1 as Polish.

Note on population: The difference values of population numbers in the table "Population statistic" and in the sections "Ethnicity" & "Religion" is caused by the use of various statistical methods.

=== Religion ===
Census 2021 (1+ %)
Religion	Number	Fraction
Roman Catholic Church	519	75%
None	115	16.62%
Not found out	20	2.89%
Evangelical Church	20	2.89%
Total	692	

In year 2021 was 692 people by religion 519 from Roman Catholic Church, 115 from None, 20 from Not found out, 20 from Evangelical Church, 5 from Paganism and natural spirituality, 5 from Greek Catholic Church, 3 from Christian Congregations in Slovakia, 1 from Other, 1 from Church of the Brethren, 1 from Buddhism, 1 from Apostolic Church and 1 from Ad hoc movements.
