= Machulince =

Machulince Maholány
- Municipality
- Flag

- Location of Machulince in the Nitra Region Location of Machulince in Slovakia
- Coordinates: 48.42°N 18.43°E
- Country: Slovakia
- Region: Nitra Region
- District: Zlaté Moravce District
- First mentioned: 1275

Area
  - Total: 9.42 km^{2} (3.64 sq mi)
- Elevation: 241 m (791 ft)

Population (2025)
  - Total: 1,063
- Time zone: UTC+1 (CET)
  - Summer (DST): UTC+2 (CEST)
- Postal code: 951 93
- Area code: +421 37
- Vehicle registration plate (until 2022): ZM
- Website: www.obecmachulince.sk

Machulince (Hungarian: Maholány) is a village and municipality in Zlaté Moravce District of the Nitra Region, in western-central Slovakia. Total municipality population was 1044 in 2000.

== History ==
In historical records the village was first mentioned in 1275.

== Geography ==
The municipality lies at an altitude of 241 metres (791 ft) and covers an area of 9.42 km^{2} (3.64 sq mi) (2025).

== Population ==
Population statistic (10 years)
Year	1995	2005	2015	2025
Count	995	1046	1111	1063
Difference		+5.12%	+6.21%	−4.32%

Population statistic
Year	2024	2025
Count	1087	1063
Difference		−2.20%

It has a population of 1063 people (31 December 2025).

=== Ethnicity ===
Census 2021 (1+ %)
Ethnicity	Number	Fraction
Slovak	1069	97.09%
Not found out	29	2.63%
Total	1101	

In year 2021 was 1101 people by ethnicity 1069 as Slovak, 29 as Not found out, 9 as Czech, 1 as Polish, 1 as Hungarian and 1 as Other.

Note on population: The difference values of population numbers in the table "Population statistic" and in the sections "Ethnicity" & "Religion" is caused by the use of various statistical methods.

=== Religion ===
Census 2021 (1+ %)
Religion	Number	Fraction
Roman Catholic Church	929	84.38%
None	121	10.99%
Not found out	24	2.18%
Total	1101	

In year 2021 was 1101 people by religion 929 from Roman Catholic Church, 121 from None, 24 from Not found out, 7 from Ad hoc movements, 5 from Greek Catholic Church, 5 from Apostolic Church, 4 from Evangelical Church, 2 from Jehovah's Witnesses, 2 from Other, 1 from Eastern Orthodox Church and 1 from Christian Congregations in Slovakia.
