= Kostoľany pod Tribečom =

Municipality of Slovakia

Kostoľany pod Tribečom Gímeskosztolány
- Municipality
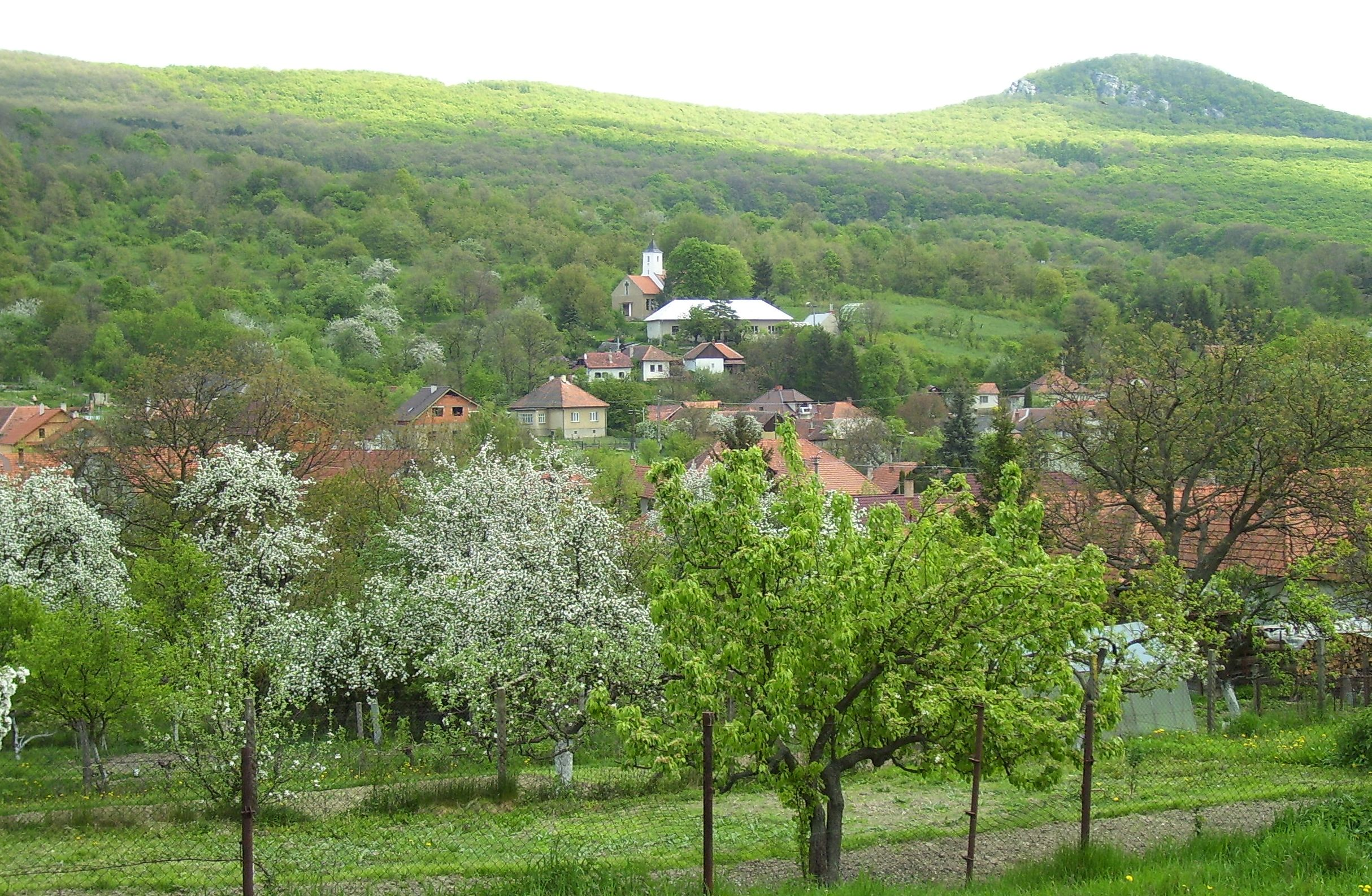

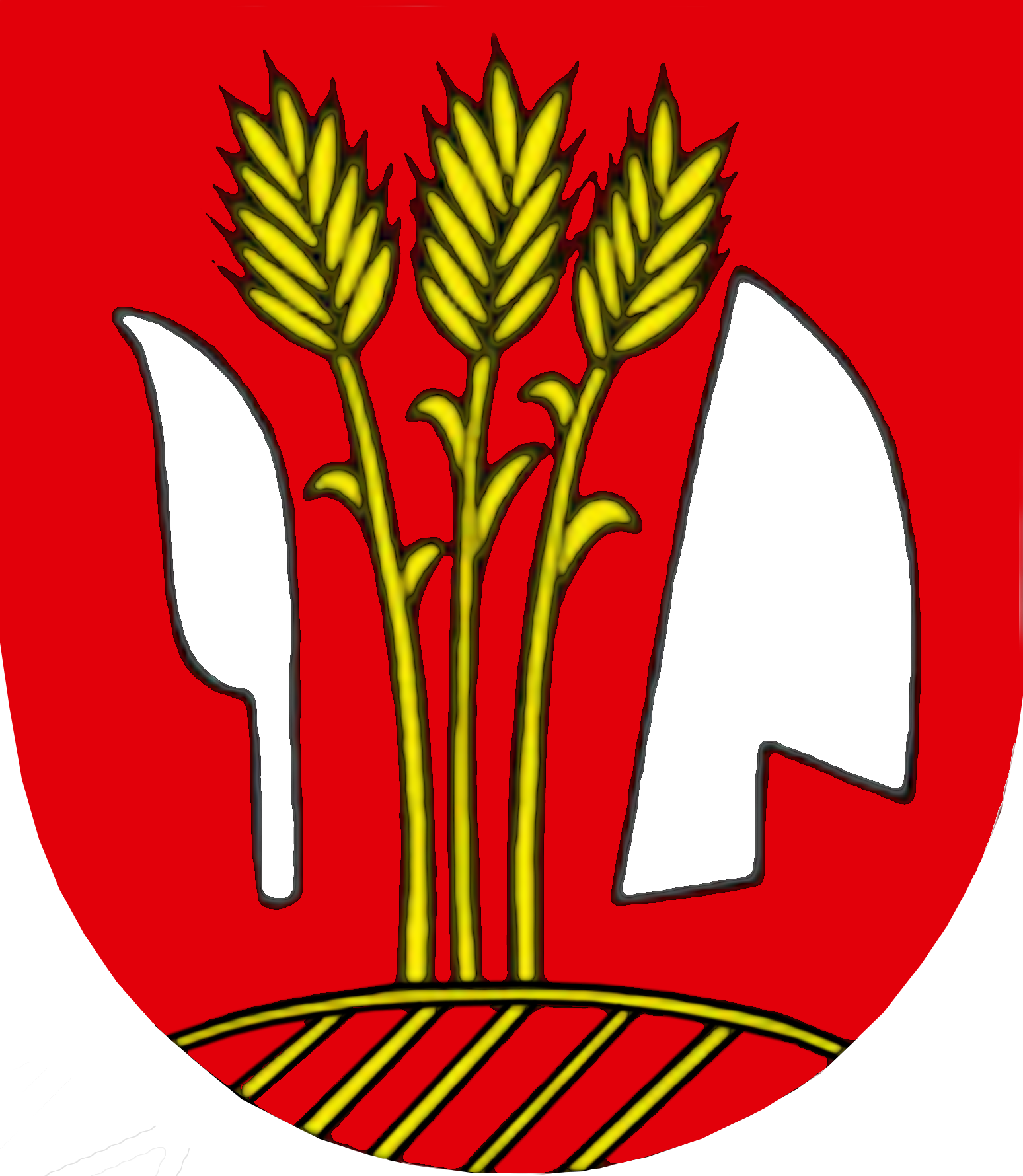
- Flag Coat of arms

- Location of Kostoľany pod Tribečom in the Nitra Region Location of Kostoľany pod Tribečom in Slovakia
- Coordinates: 48.42°N 18.25°E
- Country: Slovakia
- Region: Nitra Region
- District: Zlaté Moravce District
- First mentioned: 1113

Area
  - Total: 22.12 km^{2} (8.54 sq mi)
- Elevation: 242 m (794 ft)

Population (2025)
  - Total: 334
- Time zone: UTC+1 (CET)
  - Summer (DST): UTC+2 (CEST)
- Postal code: 951 77
- Area code: +421 37
- Vehicle registration plate (until 2022): ZM
- Website: www.kostolanypodtribecom.sk

Kostoľany pod Tribečom (Hungarian: Gímeskosztolány) is a village and municipality in Zlaté Moravce District of the Nitra Region, in western-central Slovakia.

== History ==
In historical records the village was first mentioned in 1113.

== Geography ==
The municipality lies at an altitude of 242 metres (794 ft) and covers an area of 22.12 km^{2} (8.54 sq mi) (2025).

== Population ==
Population statistic (10 years)
Year	1995	2005	2015	2025
Count	399	359	346	334
Difference		−10.02%	−3.62%	−3.46%

Population statistic
Year	2024	2025
Count	335	334
Difference		−0.29%

It has a population of 334 people (31 December 2025).

=== Ethnicity ===
Census 2021 (1+%)
Ethnicity	Number	Fraction
Slovak	336	97.67%
Hungarian	7	2.03%
Total	344	

In year 2021 was 344 people by ethnicity 336 as Slovak, 7 as Hungarian, 3 as Czech, 2 as Not found out, 1 as Italian, 1 as Romanian and 1 as Other.

Note on population: The difference values of population numbers in the table "Population statistic" and in the sections "Ethnicity" & "Religion" is caused by the use of various statistical methods.

=== Religion ===
Census 2021 (1+%)
Religion	Number	Fraction
Roman Catholic Church	266	77.33%
None	56	16.28%
Not found out	9	2.62%
Evangelical Church	4	1.16%
Total	344	

In year 2021 was 344 people by religion 266 from Roman Catholic Church, 56 from None, 9 from Not found out, 4 from Evangelical Church, 2 from Other, 2 from Greek Catholic Church, 1 from Calvinist Church, 1 from Other and not ascertained christian church, 1 from Christian Congregations in Slovakia, 1 from Buddhism and 1 from Ad hoc movements.

== Economy ==
The village is almost exclusively dedicated to stockbreeding and agriculture, specializing in wine.

== Genealogical resources ==
The records for genealogical research are available at the state archive "Statny Archiv in Nitra, Slovakia"

- Roman Catholic church records (births/marriages/deaths): 1713-1901 (parish B)

== Church of Saint George ==
The Church of Saint George (Kostol svätého Juraja) is a simple one-nave church of pre-romanesque origin with later romanesque, baroque and modern extensions. It lies on the hill in the eastern part of the village. In 1960, the church acquired interest of experts after the discovery of medieval paintings and further research led to dating to the period before the second half of the 11th century. Subsequently, the church had been referenced in literature for decades as an oldest remaining sacral building in Slovakia. After breakthrough discoveries in Kopčany and revised dating of Church of St. Margaret of Antioch, a revised archaeological and artistic research have been done also in Kostoľany pod Tribečom.

The church belongs to remaining sacral buildings in Slovakia that are considered to be of potential Great Moravian origin. The result of chronometric research of masonry published in 2015 indices that the church was built at the end of the 9th or in the first third of the 10th century.

== Gallery ==
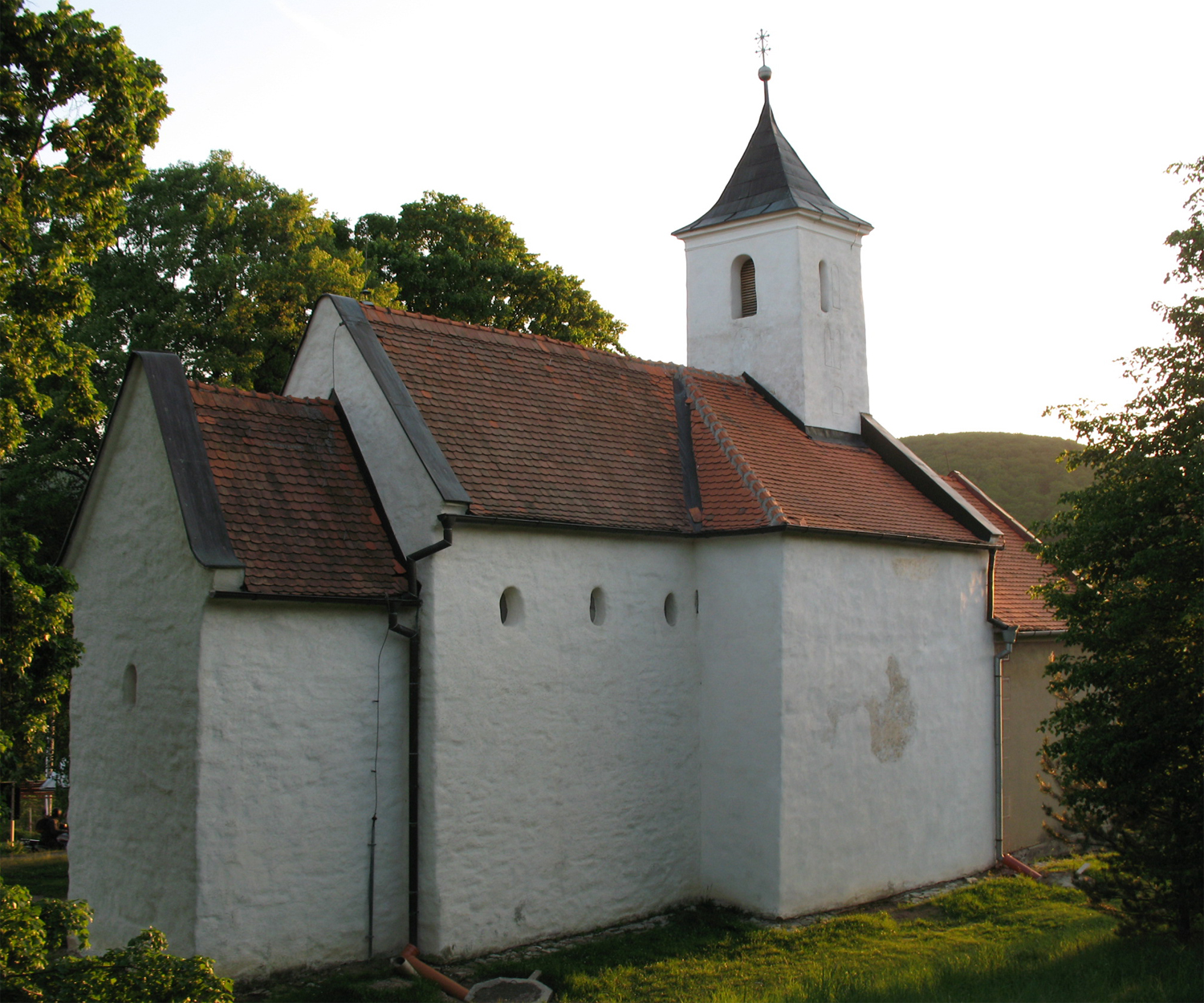

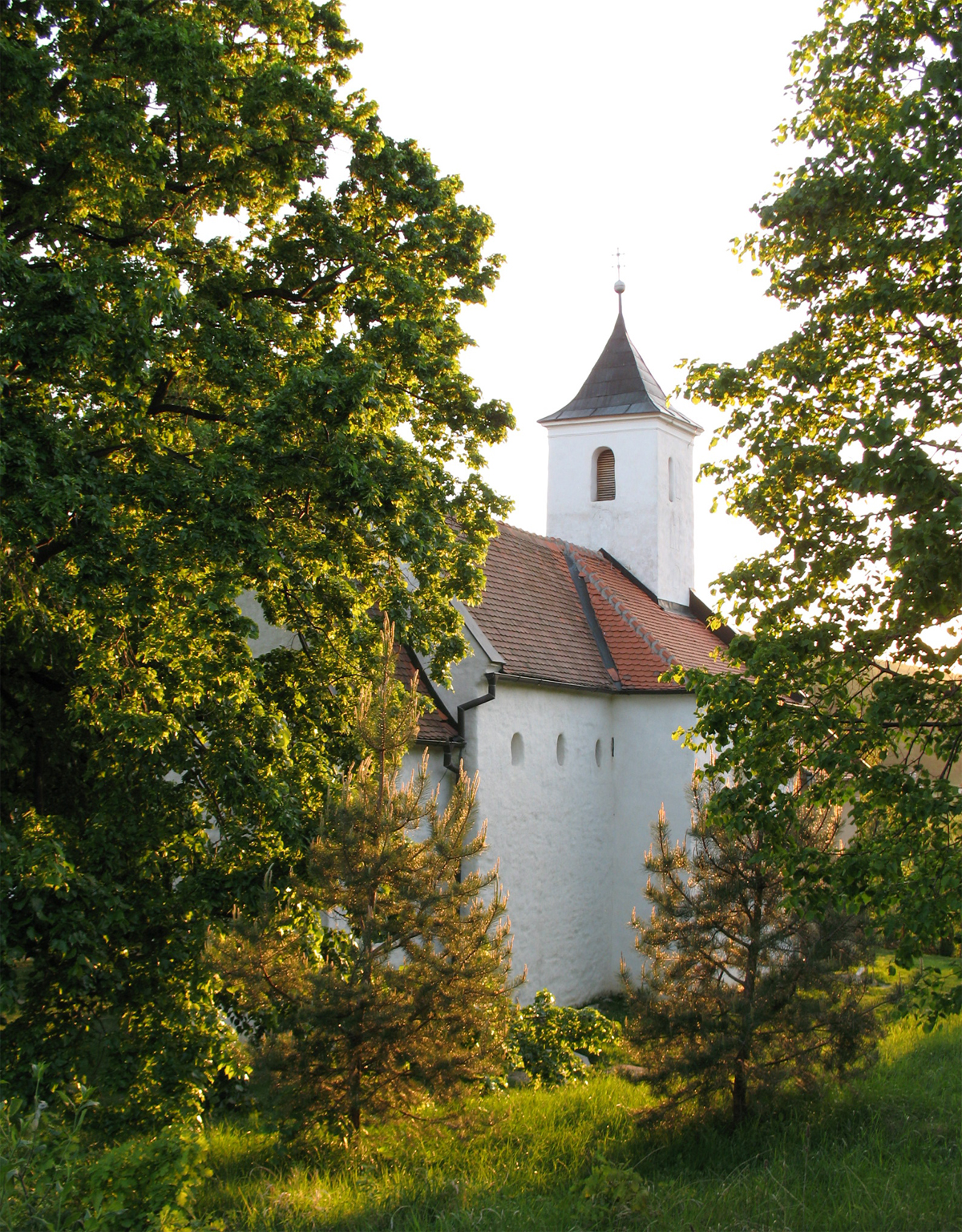

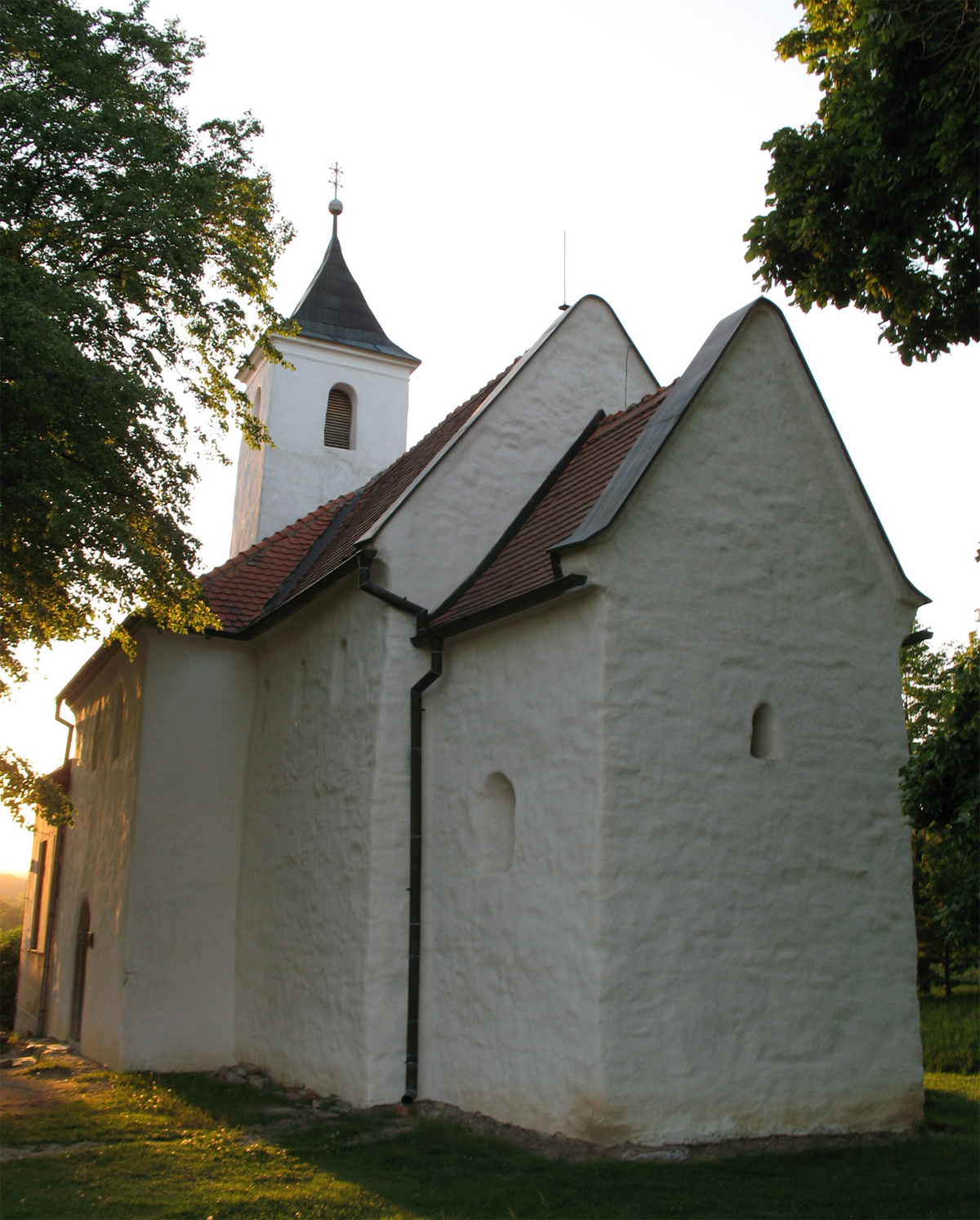

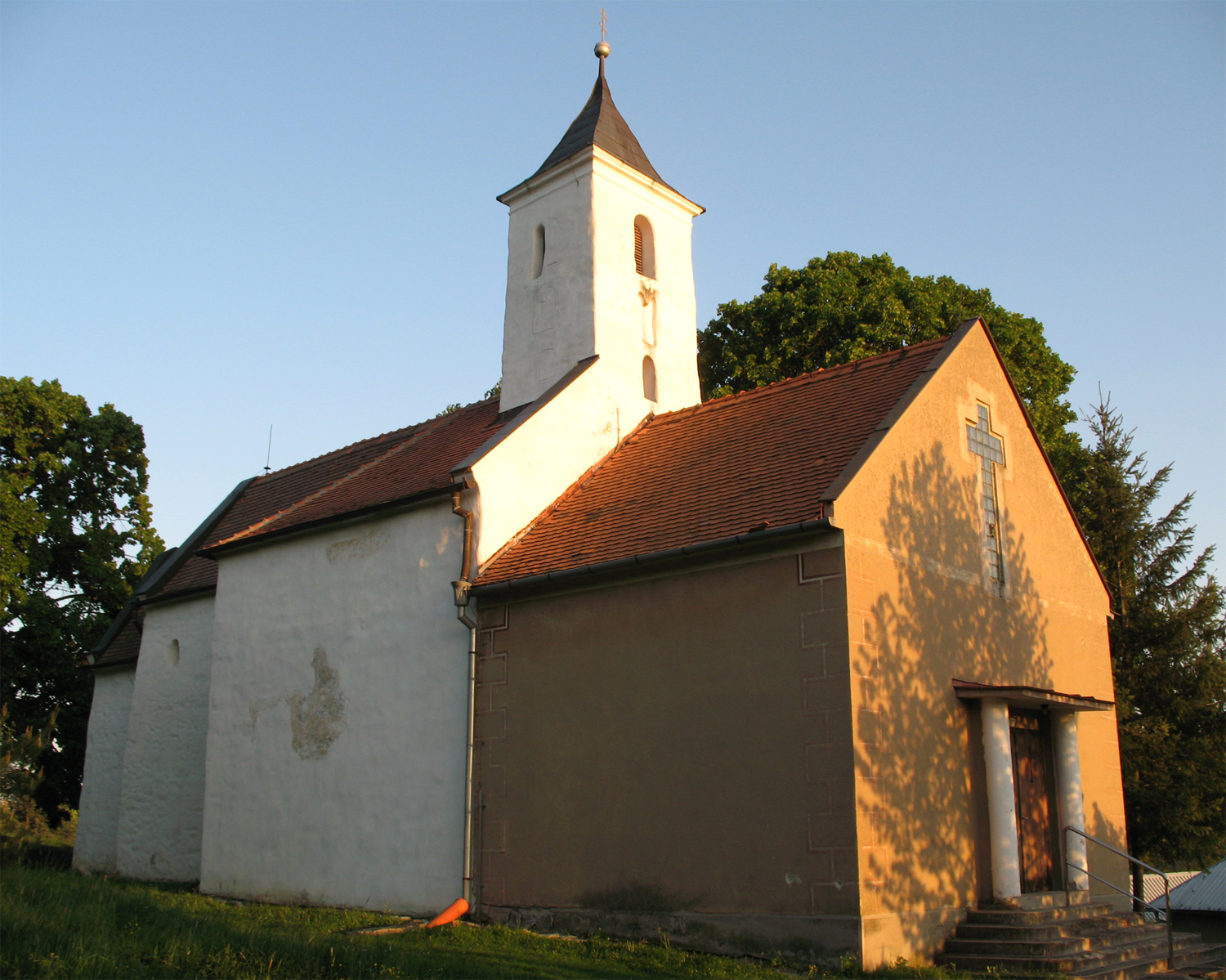

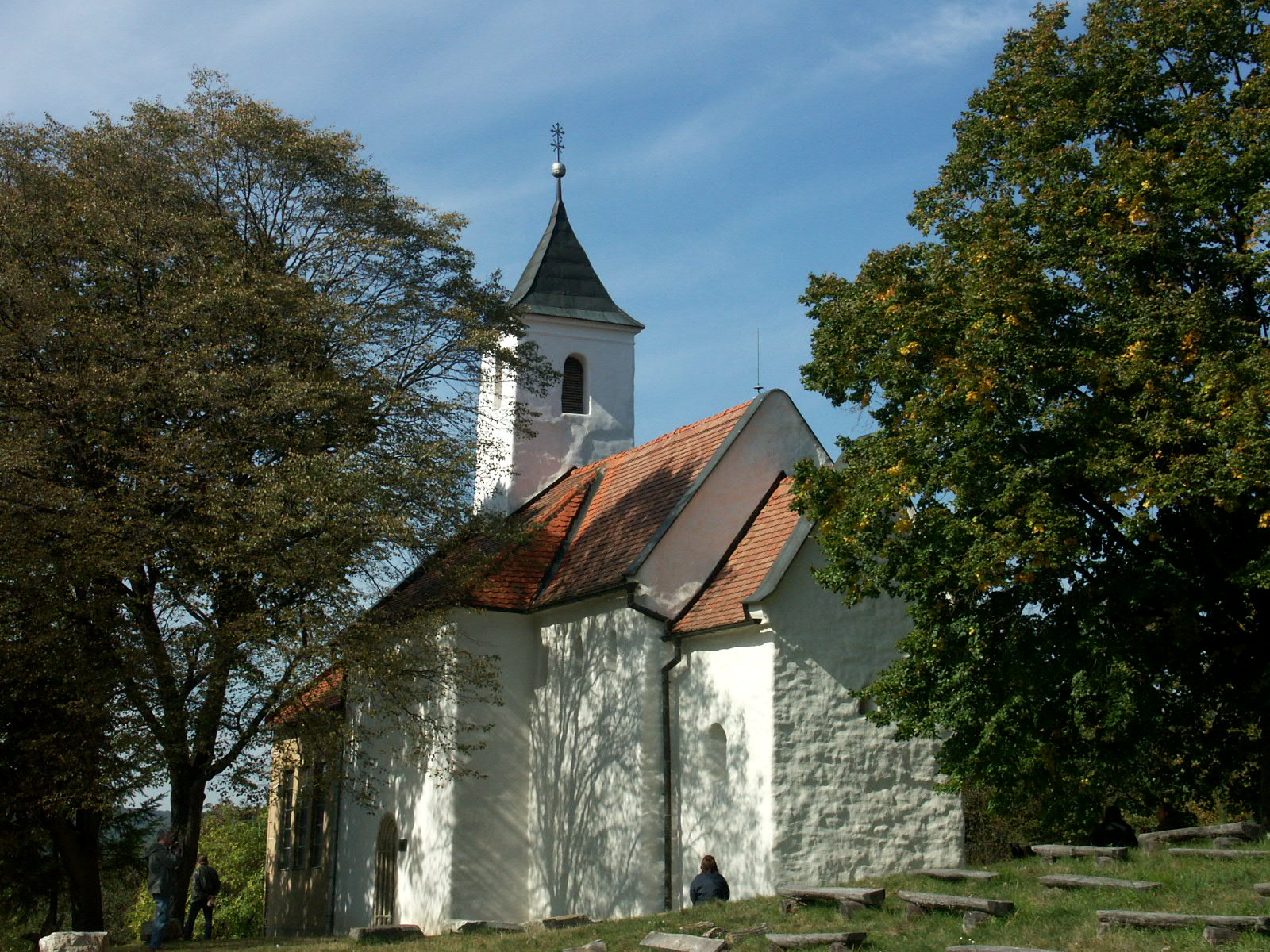

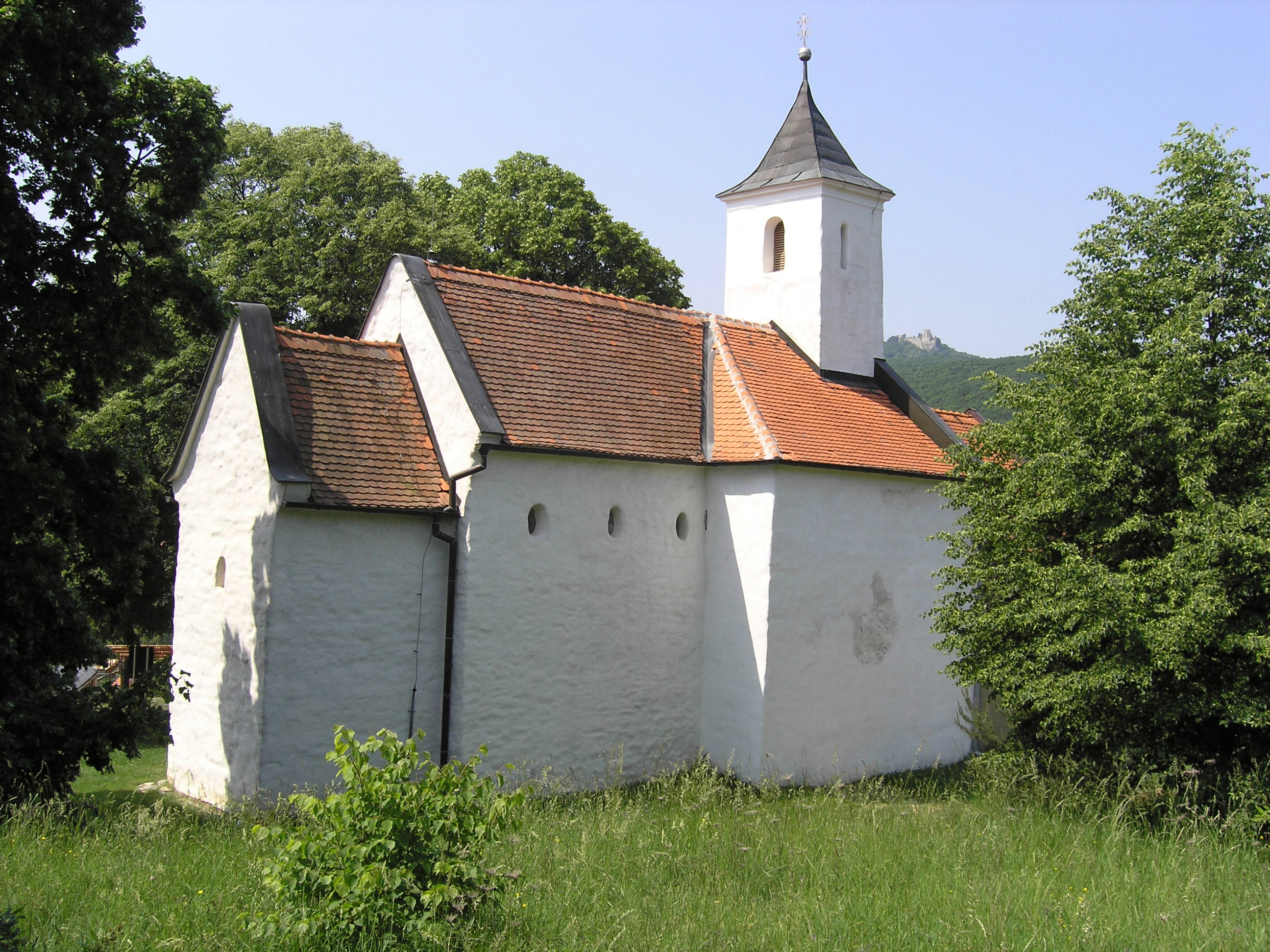

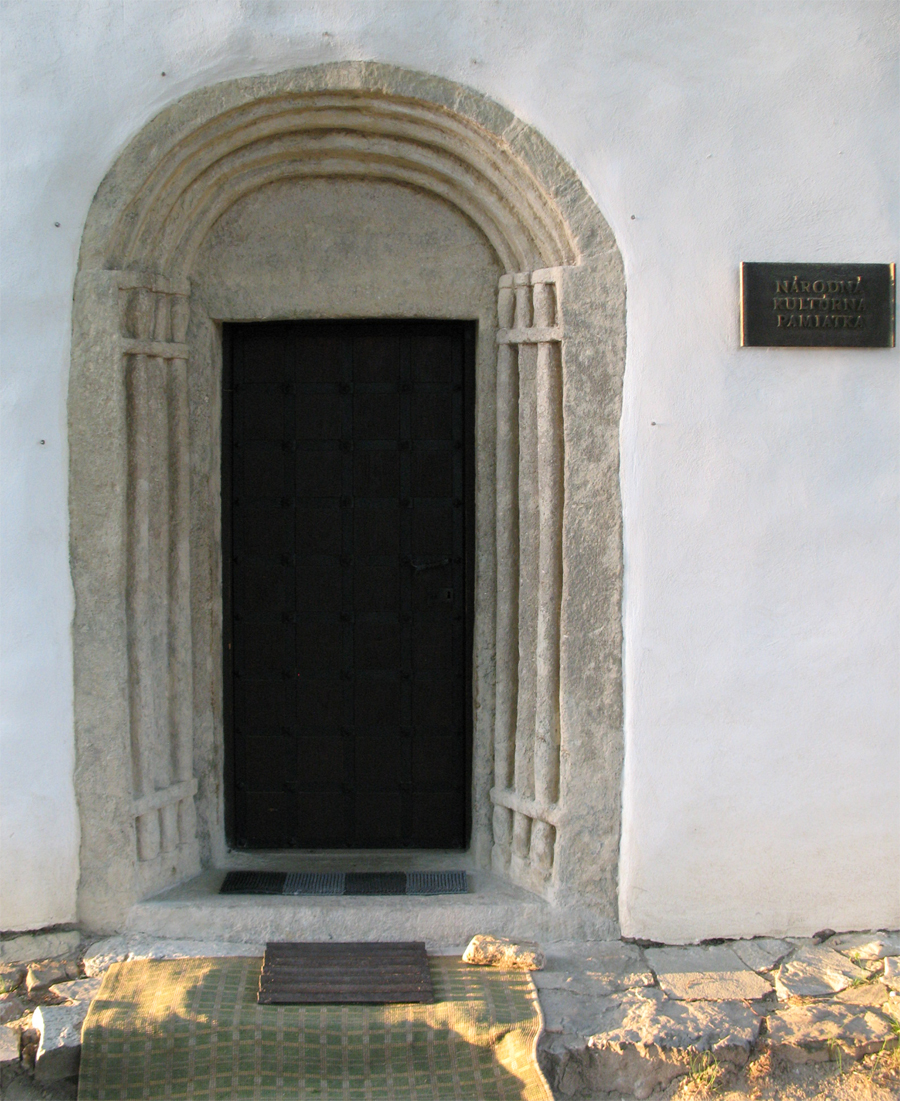

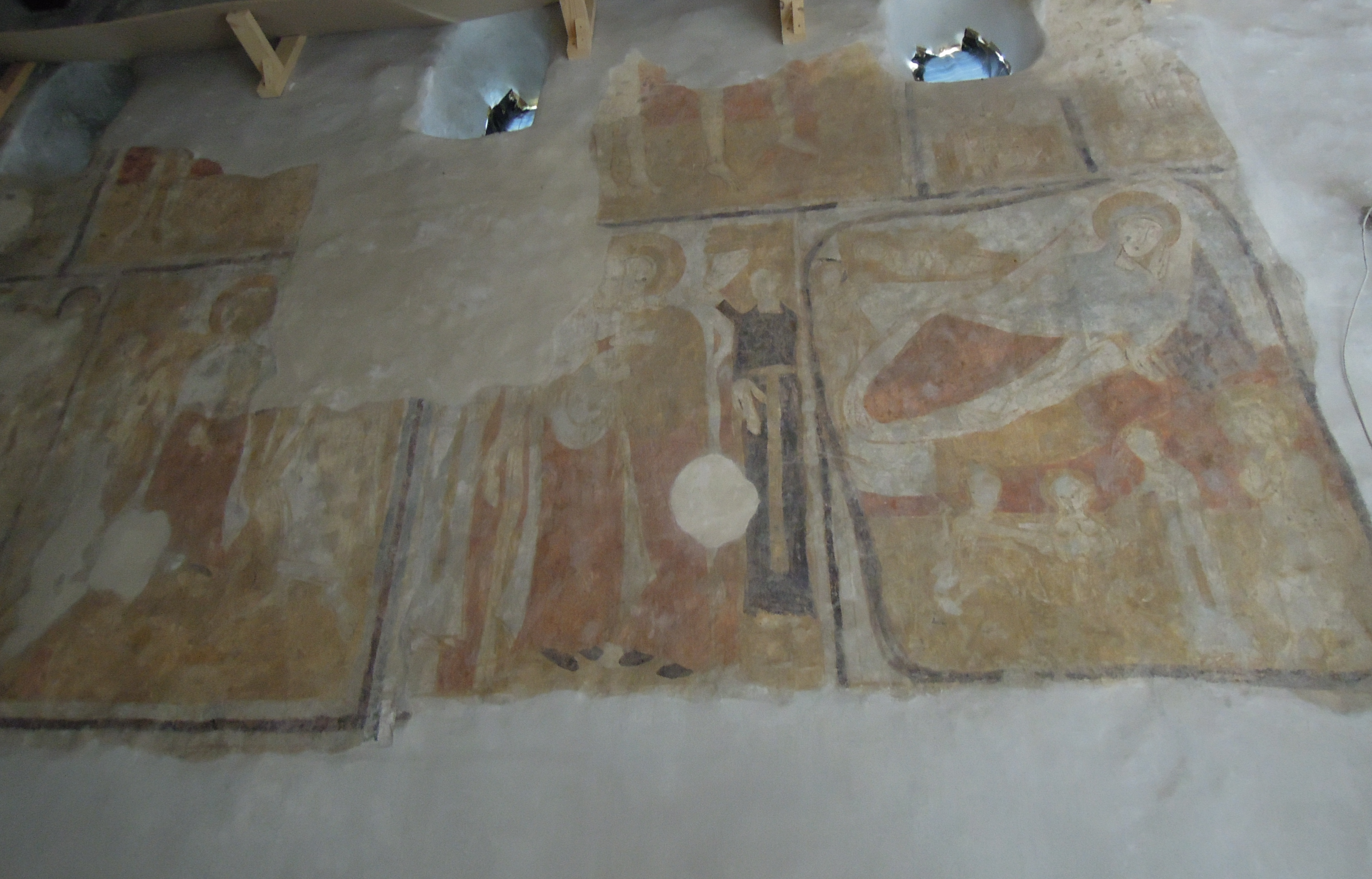

== Sources ==
- Botek, Andrej (2014). Veľkomoravské kostoly na Slovensku [The Great Moravian Churches in Slovakia] (in Slovak). Bratislava: Post Scriptum. ISBN 978-80-89567-37-9.
- Barta, Peter; Bóna, Martin; Keleši, Marián (2015). "Chronometrický výskum murív Kostola sv. Juraja v Kostoľanoch pod Tribečom" [Chronometric research of Masonry of St. George's Church in Kostoľany pod Tribečom]. Archaeologia Historica (in Slovak). 40 (2). Brno: Masarykova univerzita, Filozofická fakulta. ISSN 2336-4386.
