= Jedľové Kostoľany =

Jedľové Kostoľany Fenyőkosztolány
- Municipality
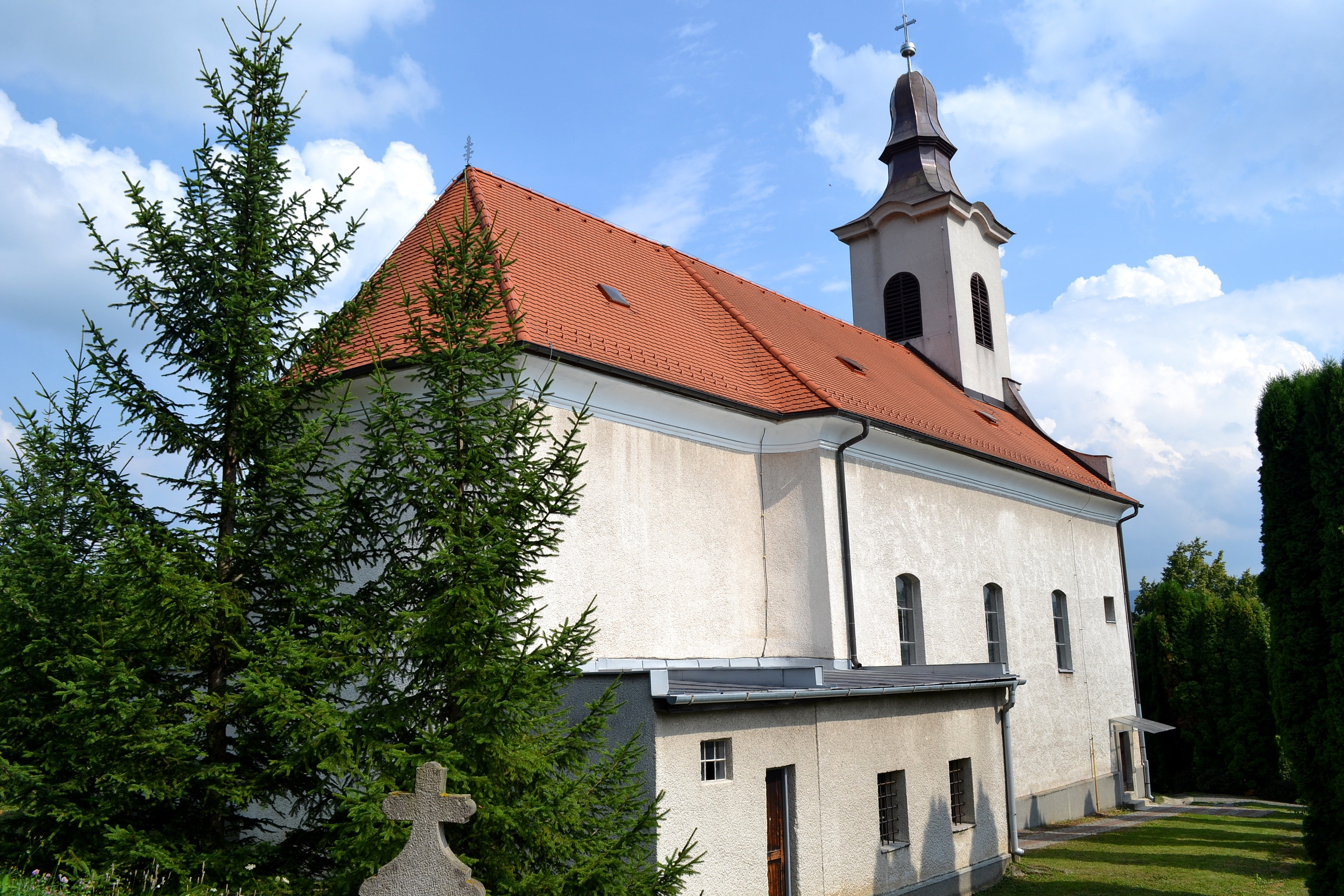
- Church of All Saints

- Flag Coat of arms

- Location of Jedľové Kostoľany in the Nitra Region Location of Jedľové Kostoľany in Slovakia
- Coordinates: 48.47°N 18.50°E
- Country: Slovakia
- Region: Nitra Region
- District: Zlaté Moravce District
- First mentioned: 1387

Area
  - Total: 27.29 km^{2} (10.54 sq mi)
- Elevation: 394 m (1,293 ft)

Population (2025)
  - Total: 862
- Time zone: UTC+1 (CET)
  - Summer (DST): UTC+2 (CEST)
- Postal code: 951 96
- Area code: +421 37
- Vehicle registration plate (until 2022): ZM
- Website: jedlovekostolany.sk

Jedľové Kostoľany (Hungarian: Fenyőkosztolány) is a village and municipality in Zlaté Moravce District of the Nitra Region, in western-central Slovakia.

== History ==
In historical records the village was first mentioned in 1387.

== Geography ==
The municipality lies at an altitude of 394 metres (1,293 ft) and covers an area of 27.29 km^{2} (10.54 sq mi) (2025).

== See also ==
- List of municipalities and towns in Slovakia

== Population ==
Population statistic (10 years)
Year	1995	2005	2015	2025
Count	1089	1003	911	862
Difference		−7.89%	−9.17%	−5.37%

Population statistic
Year	2024	2025
Count	871	862
Difference		−1.03%

It has a population of 862 people (31 December 2025).

=== Ethnicity ===
Census 2021 (1+ %)
Ethnicity	Number	Fraction
Slovak	864	97.4%
Not found out	23	2.59%
Romani	17	1.91%
Total	887	

In year 2021 was 887 people by ethnicity 864 as Slovak, 23 as Not found out, 17 as Romani, 6 as Czech, 4 as Other, 2 as Hungarian, 1 as Jewish, 1 as Ukrainian, 1 as Rusyn, 1 as Russian and 1 as Polish.

Note on population: The difference values of population numbers in the table "Population statistic" and in the sections "Ethnicity" & "Religion" is caused by the use of various statistical methods.

=== Religion ===
Census 2021 (1+ %)
Religion	Number	Fraction
Roman Catholic Church	682	76.89%
None	146	16.46%
Not found out	19	2.14%
Evangelical Church	10	1.13%
Other	9	1.01%
Total	887	

In year 2021 was 887 people by religion 682 from Roman Catholic Church, 146 from None, 19 from Not found out, 10 from Evangelical Church, 9 from Other, 6 from Greek Catholic Church, 4 from Ad hoc movements, 3 from Eastern Orthodox Church, 2 from Paganism and natural spirituality, 2 from Christian Congregations in Slovakia, 1 from Calvinist Church, 1 from Jehovah's Witnesses, 1 from Seventh-day Adventist Church and 1 from Buddhism.

== Genealogical resources ==
The records for genealogical research are available at the state archive "Statny Archiv in Nitra, Slovakia"

- Roman Catholic church records (births/marriages/deaths): 1762-1904 (parish A)
