= Čaradice =

Čaradice Csárad
- Municipality
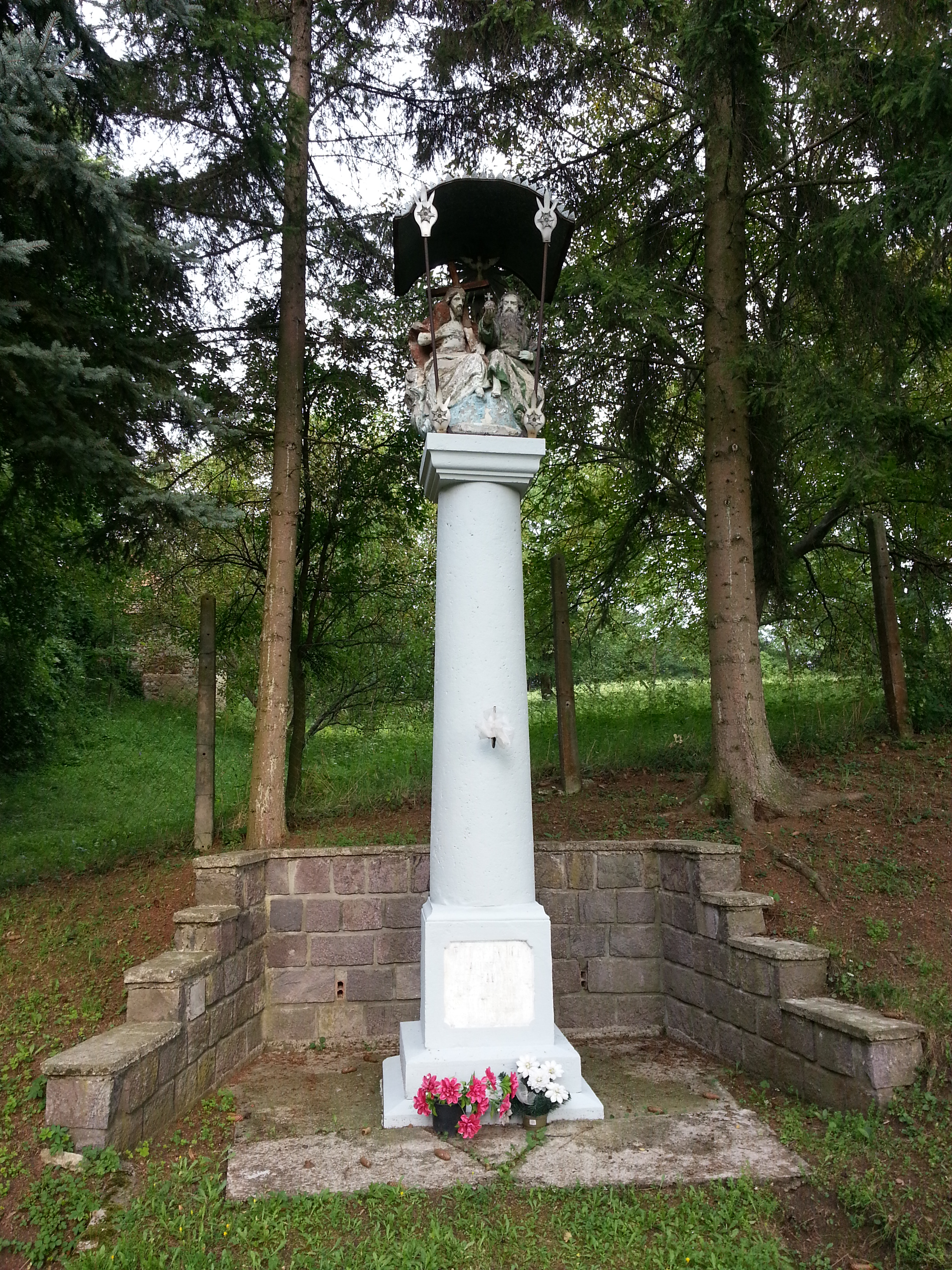

- Flag

- Location of Čaradice in the Nitra Region Location of Čaradice in Slovakia
- Coordinates: 48.37°N 18.52°E
- Country: Slovakia
- Region: Nitra Region
- District: Zlaté Moravce District
- First mentioned: 1209

Area
  - Total: 17.84 km^{2} (6.89 sq mi)
- Elevation: 245 m (804 ft)

Population (2025)
  - Total: 590
- Time zone: UTC+1 (CET)
  - Summer (DST): UTC+2 (CEST)
- Postal code: 953 01
- Area code: +421 37
- Vehicle registration plate (until 2022): ZM
- Website: www.caradice.sk

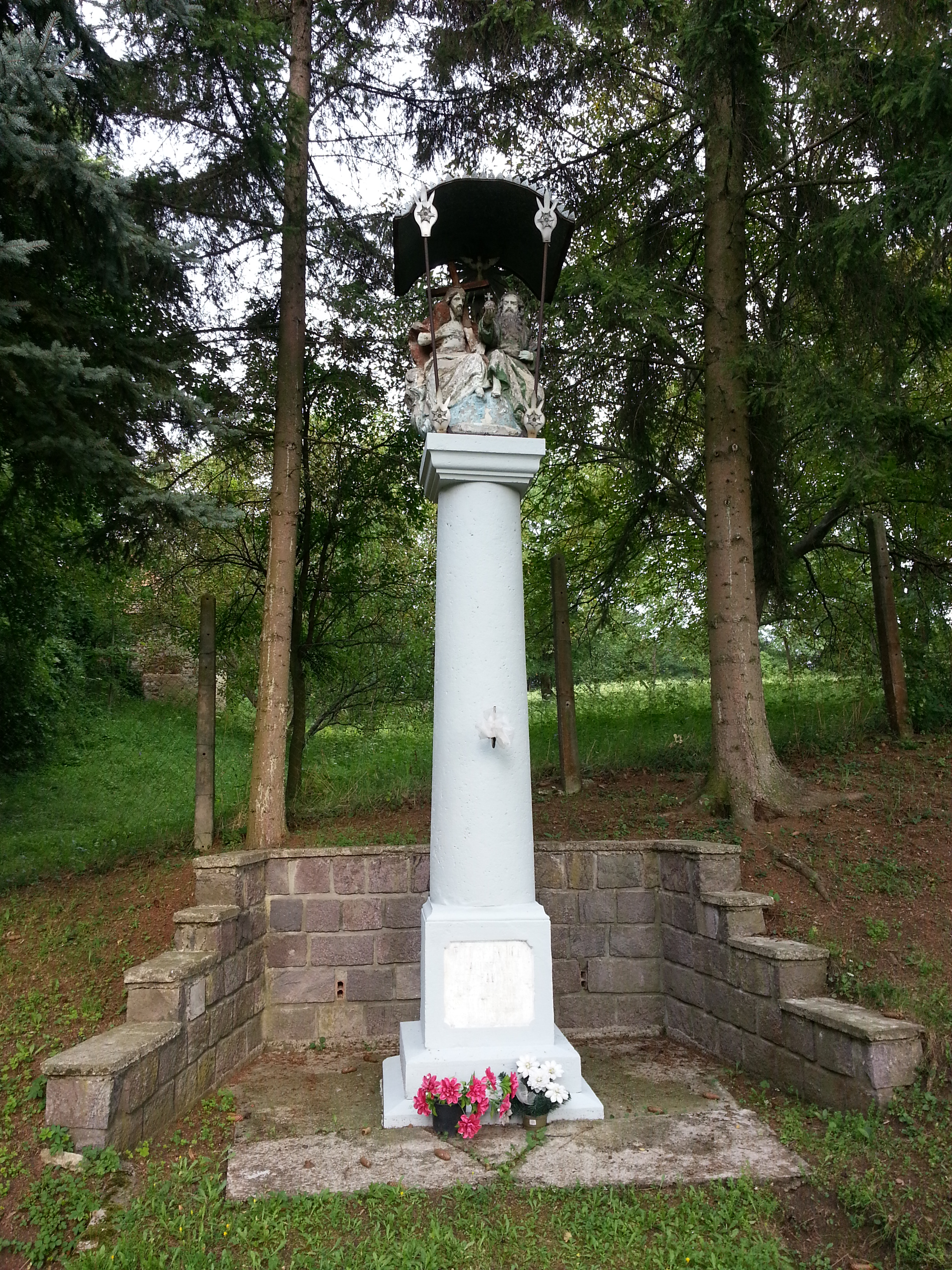

Čaradice (Hungarian: Csárad) is a village and municipality in Zlaté Moravce District of the Nitra Region, in western-central Slovakia.

== History ==
In historical records the village was first mentioned in 1209.

== Geography ==
The municipality lies at an altitude of 245 metres (804 ft) and covers an area of 17.84 km^{2} (6.89 sq mi) (2025).

== Population ==
Population statistic (10 years)
Year	1995	2005	2015	2025
Count	553	528	497	590
Difference		−4.52%	−5.87%	+18.71%

Population statistic
Year	2024	2025
Count	545	590
Difference		+8.25%

It has a population of 590 people (31 December 2025).

=== Ethnicity ===
Census 2021 (1+ %)
Ethnicity	Number	Fraction
Slovak	472	92.18%
Not found out	43	8.39%
Total	512	

In year 2021 was 512 people by ethnicity 472 as Slovak, 43 as Not found out, 2 as Hungarian, 1 as Rusyn, 1 as Canadian, 1 as Other and 1 as Bulgarian.

Note on population: The difference values of population numbers in the table "Population statistic" and in the sections "Ethnicity" & "Religion" is caused by the use of various statistical methods.

=== Religion ===
Census 2021 (1+ %)
Religion	Number	Fraction
Roman Catholic Church	396	77.34%
None	56	10.94%
Not found out	39	7.62%
Total	512	

In year 2021 was 512 people by religion 396 from Roman Catholic Church, 56 from None, 39 from Not found out, 4 from Christian Congregations in Slovakia, 4 from United Methodist Church, 4 from Ad hoc movements, 3 from Eastern Orthodox Church, 2 from Other, 1 from Jewish community, 1 from Greek Catholic Church, 1 from Evangelical Church and 1 from Apostolic Church.

== Genealogical resources ==
The records for genealogical research are available at the state archive "Statny Archiv in Nitra, Slovakia"

- Roman Catholic church records (births/marriages/deaths): 1742-1894 (parish B)

== See also ==
- List of municipalities and towns in Slovakia
