= Nemčiňany =

Nemčiňany Nemcsény
- Municipality
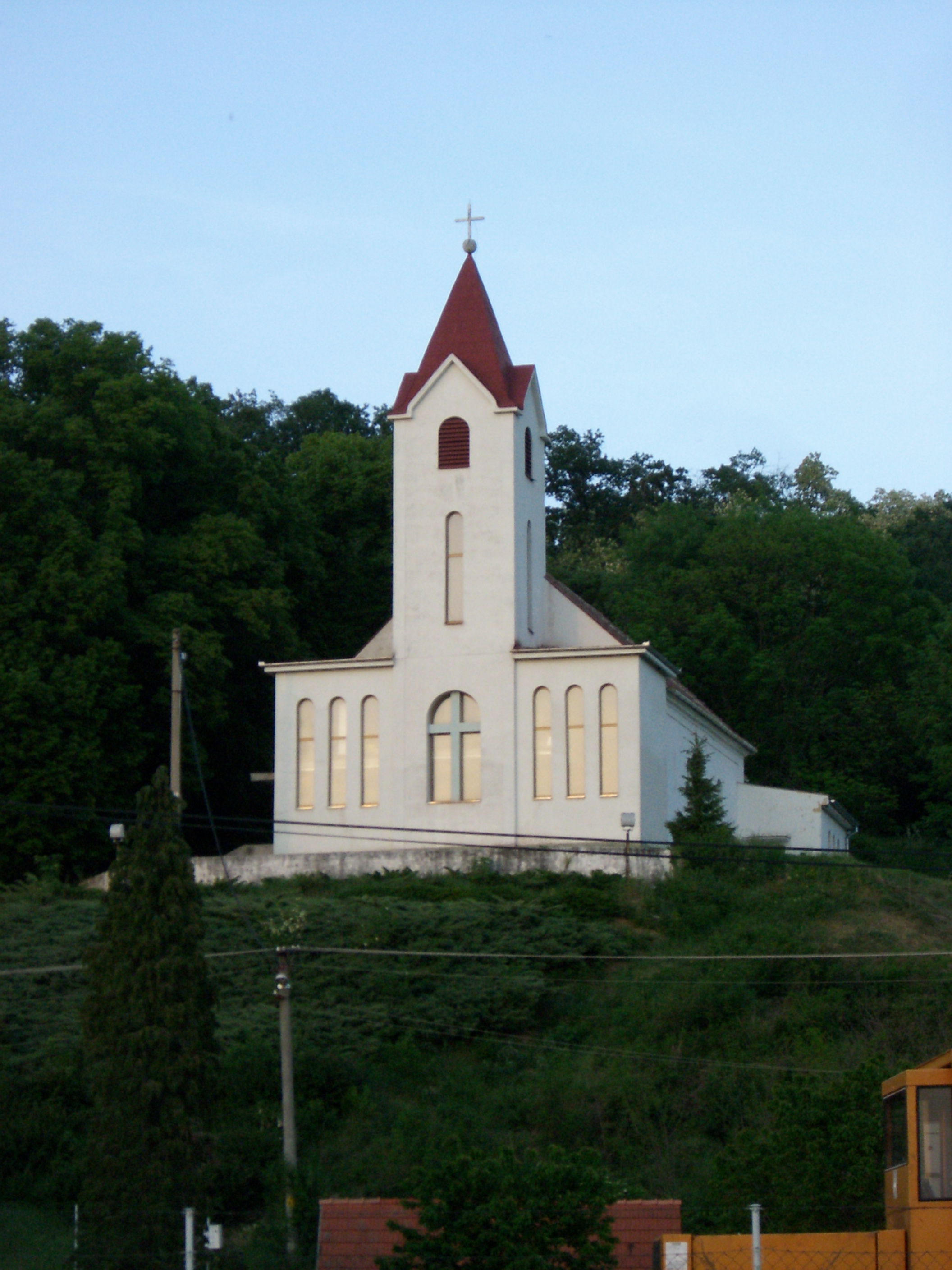

- Flag

- Location of Nemčiňany in the Nitra Region Location of Nemčiňany in Slovakia
- Coordinates: 48.31°N 18.45°E
- Country: Slovakia
- Region: Nitra Region
- District: Zlaté Moravce District
- First mentioned: 1258

Area
  - Total: 15.68 km^{2} (6.05 sq mi)
- Elevation: 192 m (630 ft)

Population (2025)
  - Total: 676
- Time zone: UTC+1 (CET)
  - Summer (DST): UTC+2 (CEST)
- Postal code: 951 81
- Area code: +421 37
- Vehicle registration plate (until 2022): ZM
- Website: www.nemcinany.sk

Nemčiňany (Hungarian: Nemcsény) is a village and municipality in Zlaté Moravce District of the Nitra Region, in western-central Slovakia.

== History ==
In historical records the village was first mentioned in 1232.

== Geography ==
The municipality lies at an altitude of 192 metres (630 ft) and covers an area of 15.68 km^{2} (6.05 sq mi) (2025).

== Population ==
Population statistic (10 years)
Year	1995	2005	2015	2025
Count	803	743	665	676
Difference		−7.47%	−10.49%	+1.65%

Population statistic
Year	2024	2025
Count	662	676
Difference		+2.11%

It has a population of 676 people (31 December 2025).

=== Ethnicity ===
Census 2021 (1+ %)
Ethnicity	Number	Fraction
Slovak	607	92.81%
Not found out	42	6.42%
Romani	27	4.12%
Czech	11	1.68%
Total	654	

In year 2021 was 654 people by ethnicity 607 as Slovak, 42 as Not found out, 27 as Romani, 11 as Czech, 2 as Hungarian, 1 as Ukrainian, 1 as Other, 1 as Bulgarian and 1 as English.

Note on population: The difference values of population numbers in the table "Population statistic" and in the sections "Ethnicity" & "Religion" is caused by the use of various statistical methods.

=== Religion ===
Census 2021 (1+ %)
Religion	Number	Fraction
Roman Catholic Church	477	72.94%
None	114	17.43%
Not found out	44	6.73%
Total	654	

In year 2021 was 654 people by religion 477 from Roman Catholic Church, 114 from None, 44 from Not found out, 4 from Christian Congregations in Slovakia, 3 from Greek Catholic Church, 3 from Evangelical Church, 2 from Calvinist Church, 2 from Eastern Orthodox Church, 2 from Jehovah's Witnesses, 1 from Other, 1 from Czechoslovak Hussite Church and 1 from Ad hoc movements.

== Pictures ==
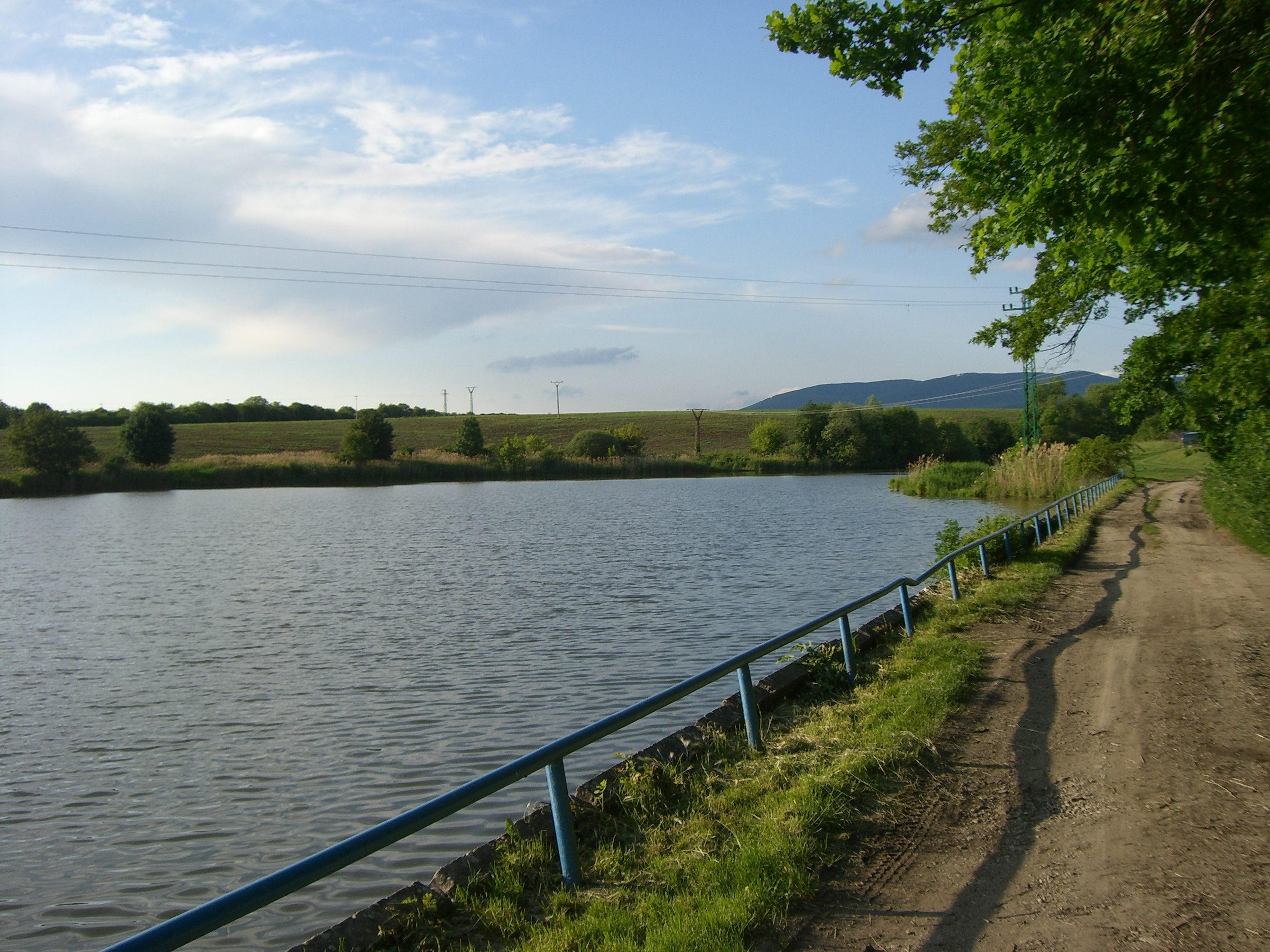

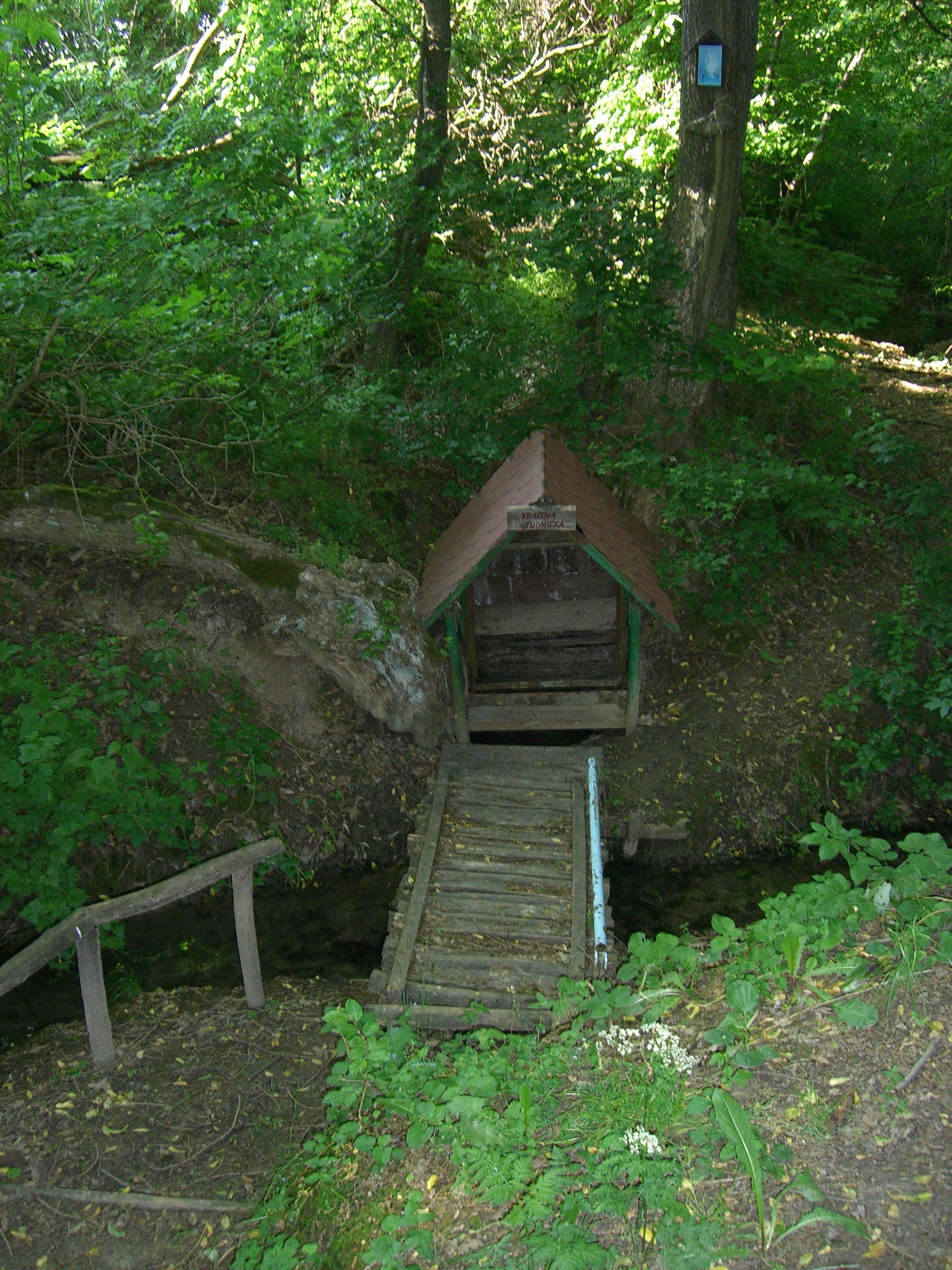
