= Lovce =

Lovce Kislóc
- Municipality
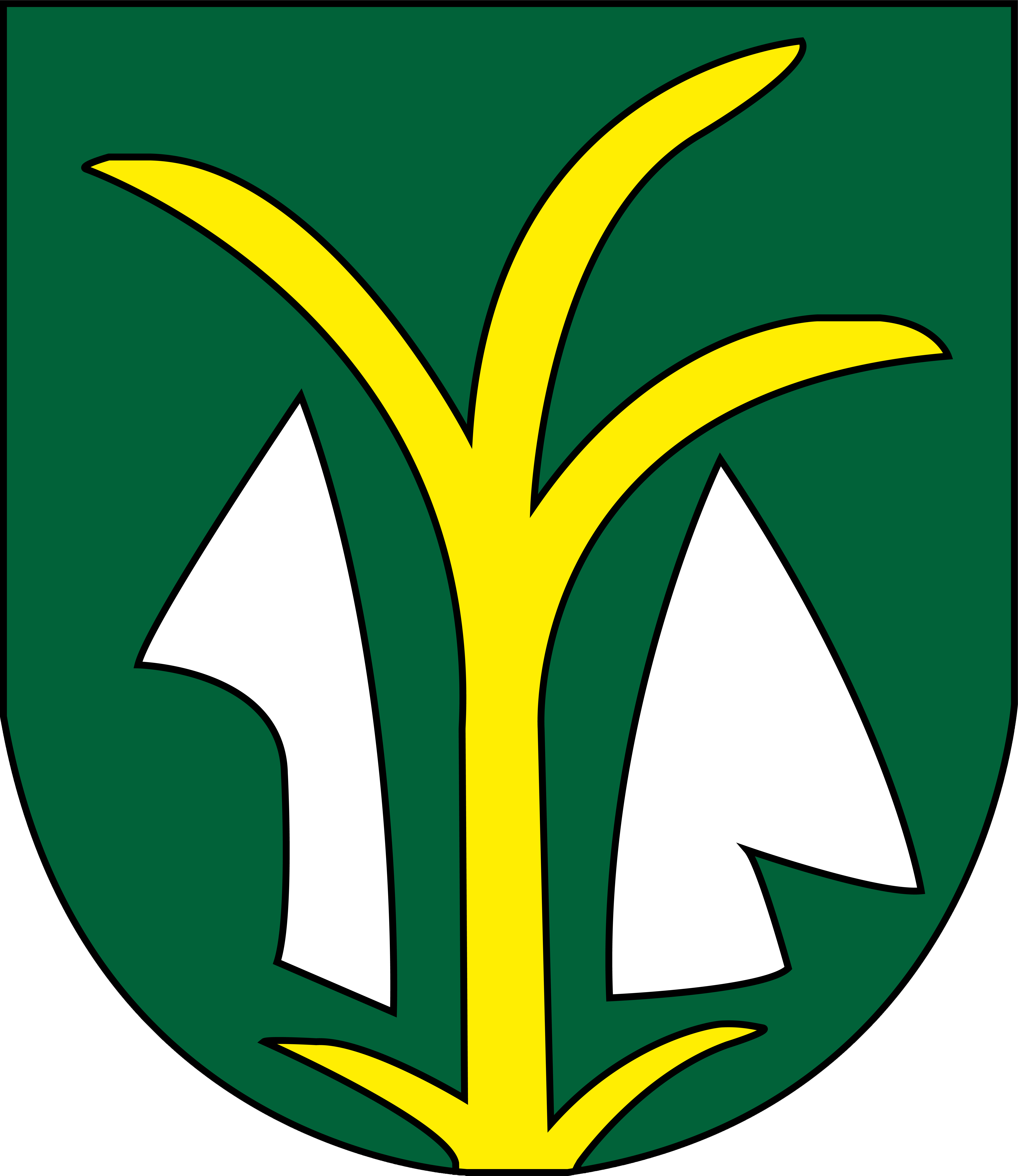
- Flag Coat of arms

- Location of Lovce in the Nitra Region Location of Lovce in Slovakia
- Coordinates: 48.44°N 18.36°E
- Country: Slovakia
- Region: Nitra Region
- District: Zlaté Moravce District
- First mentioned: 1323

Area
  - Total: 10.18 km^{2} (3.93 sq mi)
- Elevation: 271 m (889 ft)

Population (2025)
  - Total: 683
- Time zone: UTC+1 (CET)
  - Summer (DST): UTC+2 (CEST)
- Postal code: 951 92
- Area code: +421 37
- Vehicle registration plate (until 2022): ZM
- Website: www.obeclovce.sk

Lovce (Hungarian: Kislóc) is a village and municipality in Zlaté Moravce District of the Nitra Region, in western-central Slovakia.

== Geography ==
The municipality lies at an altitude of 271 metres (889 ft) and covers an area of 10.18 km^{2} (3.93 sq mi) (2025).

== Population ==
Population statistic (10 years)
Year	1995	2005	2015	2025
Count	671	698	658	683
Difference		+4.02%	−5.73%	+3.79%

Population statistic
Year	2024	2025
Count	703	683
Difference		−2.84%

It has a population of 683 people (31 December 2025).

=== Ethnicity ===
Census 2021 (1+ %)
Ethnicity	Number	Fraction
Slovak	684	97.85%
Not found out	7	1%
Other	7	1%
Total	699	

In year 2021 was 699 people by ethnicity 684 as Slovak, 7 as Not found out, 7 as Other, 5 as Hungarian, 4 as Czech, 2 as Rusyn, 1 as Serbian, 1 as Polish and 1 as Croatian.

Note on population: The difference values of population numbers in the table "Population statistic" and in the sections "Ethnicity" & "Religion" is caused by the use of various statistical methods.

=== Religion ===
Census 2021 (1+ %)
Religion	Number	Fraction
Roman Catholic Church	587	83.98%
None	80	11.44%
Evangelical Church	9	1.29%
Total	699	

In year 2021 was 699 people by religion 587 from Roman Catholic Church, 80 from None, 9 from Evangelical Church, 6 from Not found out, 6 from Greek Catholic Church, 3 from Jehovah's Witnesses, 2 from Christian Congregations in Slovakia, 1 from Eastern Orthodox Church, 1 from Other, 1 from Seventh-day Adventist Church, 1 from Buddhism, 1 from Apostolic Church and 1 from Ad hoc movements.
