= Zlaté Moravce District =

Coordinates: 48°23′0″N 18°23′51″E

- District
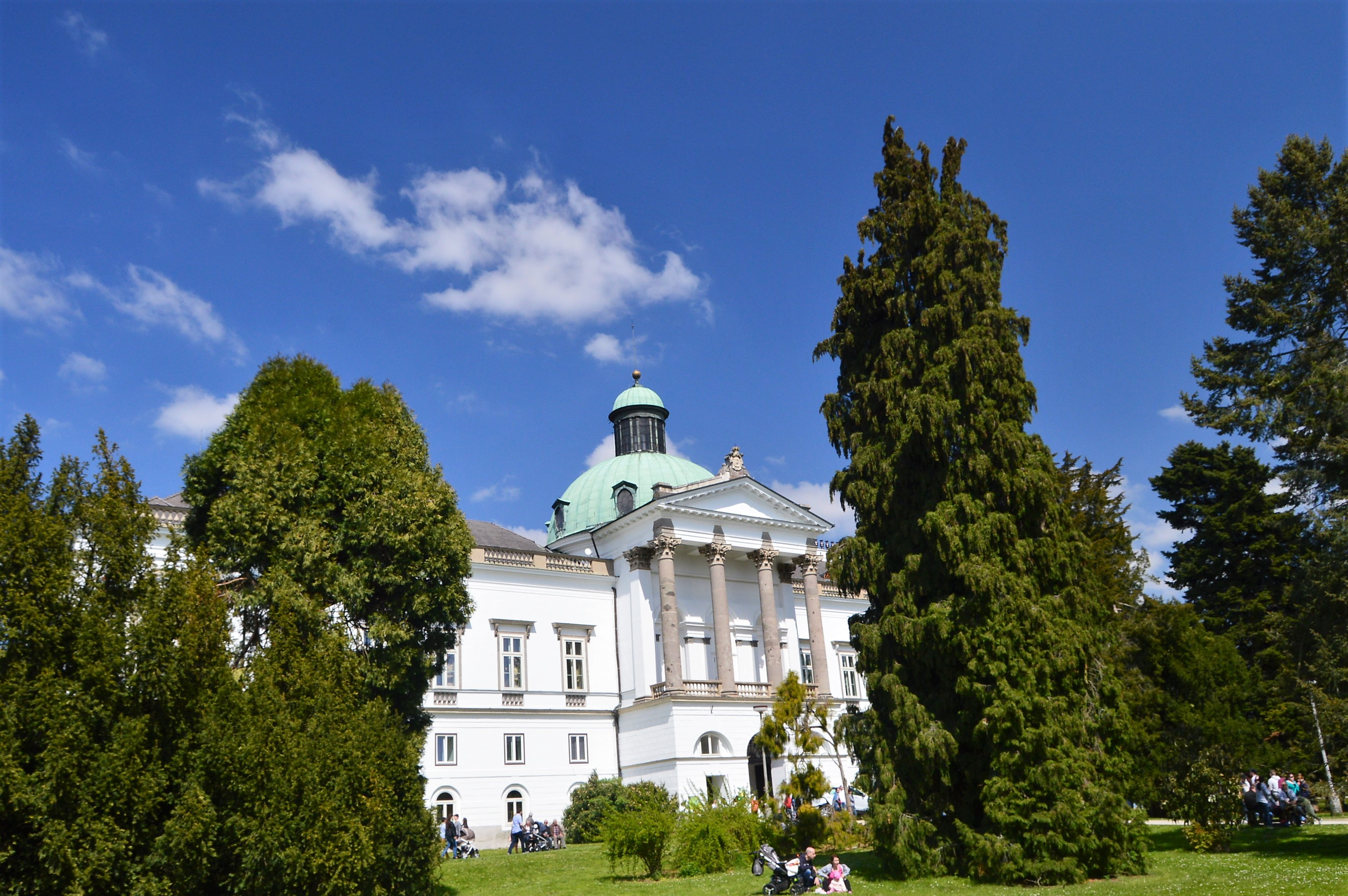
- Country: Slovakia
- Region: Nitra Region
- Seat: Zlaté Moravce

Area
  - Total: 521.16 km^{2} (201.22 sq mi)

Population (2025)
  - Total: 40,585
- Time zone: UTC+1 (CET)
  - Summer (DST): UTC+2 (CEST)
- Telephone prefix: 37
- Vehicle registration plate (until 2022): ZM
- Municipalities: 33

Zlaté Moravce District (Slovak: okres Zlaté Moravce) is a district in the Nitra Region of western Slovakia. Located in lowhills area, the industry is concentrated mostly in district seat town Zlaté Moravce, which is also the largest town in the district and its administrative and cultural center. The district was established in 1923 and in its present borders exists from 1996. Between 1960 and 1996 was the district area part of the Nitra District.

== Population ==
Population statistic (10 years)
Year	1995	2005	2015	2025
Count	43,773	43,045	40,977	40,585
Difference		−1.66%	−4.80%	−0.95%

Population statistic
Year	2024	2025
Count	40,722	40,585
Difference		−0.33%

It has a population of 40,585 people (31 December 2025).

Historical population
Year	Pop.	±%
1970	44,646	—
1980	45,076	+1.0%
1991	44,378	−1.5%
2001	43,622	−1.7%
2011	41,402	−5.1%
2021	41,169	−0.6%
Source: Statistical Office of the Slovak Republic

=== Ethnicity ===
Census 2021 (1+ %)
Ethnicity	Number	Fraction
Slovak	38,622	91.77%
Not found out	2091	4.96%
Total	42,082	

In year 2021 was 42,082 people by ethnicity 38,622 as Slovak, 2091 as Not found out, 369 as Hungarian, 319 as Romani, 261 as Czech, 115 as Other, 68 as Russian, 34 as Rusyn, 34 as Polish, 31 as Ukrainian, 28 as German, 19 as Austrian, 14 as English, 13 as Chinese, 11 as Moravian, 10 as Serbian, 6 as Jewish, 6 as Italian, 6 as Romanian, 6 as Bulgarian, 4 as Vietnamese, 3 as Canadian, 3 as French, 2 as Turkish, 2 as Silesian, 2 as Greek, 2 as Albanian and 1 as Croatian.

Note on population: The difference values of population numbers in the table "Population statistic" and in the sections "Ethnicity" & "Religion" is caused by the use of various statistical methods.

=== Religion ===
Census 2021 (1+ %)
Religion	Number	Fraction
Roman Catholic Church	31,148	75.66%
None	6393	15.53%
Not found out	2251	5.47%
Total	41,169	

In year 2021 was 41,169 people by religion 31,148 from Roman Catholic Church, 6393 from None, 2251 from Not found out, 347 from Evangelical Church, 186 from Greek Catholic Church, 144 from Ad hoc movements, 121 from Christian Congregations in Slovakia, 110 from Other, 64 from Calvinist Church, 61 from Paganism and natural spirituality, 60 from Jehovah's Witnesses, 59 from Eastern Orthodox Church, 56 from Other and not ascertained christian church, 47 from Apostolic Church, 38 from Buddhism, 26 from Old Catholic Church, 15 from Seventh-day Adventist Church, 13 from Islam, 7 from United Methodist Church, 6 from Church of the Brethren, 5 from Czechoslovak Hussite Church, 4 from Church of Jesus Christ of Latter-day Saints, 3 from Jewish community, 3 from Baptists Church and 2 from Hinduism.

== Municipalities ==
Municipality	Area [km^{2}]	Population
Beladice	22.40	1,784
Čaradice	17.84	590
Červený Hrádok	5.49	445
Čierne Kľačany	10.97	1,135
Hostie	28.16	1,164
Hosťovce	16.23	712
Choča	4.38	472
Jedľové Kostoľany	27.29	862
Kostoľany pod Tribečom	22.12	334
Ladice	11.64	728
Lovce	10.18	683
Machulince	9.42	1,063
Malé Vozokany	5.86	367
Mankovce	4.23	508
Martin nad Žitavou	4.33	584
Nemčiňany	15.68	676
Neverice	5.95	687
Nevidzany	10.25	556
Obyce	31.26	1,442
Skýcov	25.23	944
Sľažany	16.27	1,690
Slepčany	9.35	845
Tekovské Nemce	28.50	1,011
Tesárske Mlyňany	18.00	1,780
Topoľčianky	26.32	2,598
Velčice	34.70	836
Veľké Vozokany	9.87	419
Vieska nad Žitavou	5.46	427
Volkovce	11.60	987
Zlaté Moravce	45.35	11,733
Zlatno	15.36	192
Žikava	11.29	534
Žitavany	0.00	1,797

Population and area values are current for year 2025.
