= Mankovce =

Mankovce Mankóc
- Municipality
- Flag

- Location of Mankovce in the Nitra Region Location of Mankovce in Slovakia
- Coordinates: 48.42°N 18.32°E
- Country: Slovakia
- Region: Nitra Region
- District: Zlaté Moravce District
- First mentioned: 1345

Area
  - Total: 4.23 km^{2} (1.63 sq mi)
- Elevation: 241 m (791 ft)

Population (2025)
  - Total: 508
- Time zone: UTC+1 (CET)
  - Summer (DST): UTC+2 (CEST)
- Postal code: 951 91
- Area code: +421 37
- Vehicle registration plate (until 2022): ZM
- Website: www.obecmankovce.sk

Mankovce (Hungarian: Mankóc) is a village and municipality in Zlaté Moravce District of the Nitra Region, in western-central Slovakia.

== History ==
In historical records the village was first mentioned in 1345. The name of the city in Hungarian is Mankóc, earlier Mankócz ("Great auk", Pinguinus impennis).

== Geography ==
The municipality lies at an altitude of 241 metres (791 ft) and covers an area of 4.23 km^{2} (1.63 sq mi) (2025).

== Population ==
Population statistic (10 years)
Year	1995	2005	2015	2025
Count	539	529	533	508
Difference		−1.85%	+0.75%	−4.69%

Population statistic
Year	2024	2025
Count	510	508
Difference		−0.39%

It has a population of 508 people (31 December 2025).

=== Ethnicity ===
Census 2021 (1+ %)
Ethnicity	Number	Fraction
Slovak	515	97.53%
Not found out	9	1.7%
Total	528	

In year 2021 was 528 people by ethnicity 515 as Slovak, 9 as Not found out, 2 as Other, 1 as Czech, 1 as Russian, 1 as German and 1 as Hungarian.

Note on population: The difference values of population numbers in the table "Population statistic" and in the sections "Ethnicity" & "Religion" is caused by the use of various statistical methods.

=== Religion ===
Census 2021 (1+ %)
Religion	Number	Fraction
Roman Catholic Church	448	84.85%
None	56	10.61%
Not found out	10	1.89%
Total	528	

In year 2021 was 528 people by religion 448 from Roman Catholic Church, 56 from None, 10 from Not found out, 4 from Evangelical Church, 3 from Greek Catholic Church, 3 from Ad hoc movements, 2 from Other, 1 from Calvinist Church and 1 from Buddhism.
