= Sľažany =

Sľažany Szelezsény
- Municipality
- Flag

- Location of Sľažany in the Nitra Region Location of Sľažany in Slovakia
- Coordinates: 48.39°N 18.33°E
- Country: Slovakia
- Region: Nitra Region
- District: Zlaté Moravce District
- First mentioned: 1156

Government
  - Mayor: Jozef Magát (Jozef Magát (SMER SD))

Area
  - Total: 16.27 km^{2} (6.28 sq mi)
- Elevation: 198 m (650 ft)

Population (2025)
  - Total: 1,690
- Time zone: UTC+1 (CET)
  - Summer (DST): UTC+2 (CEST)
- Postal code: 951 71
- Area code: +421 37
- Vehicle registration plate (until 2022): ZM
- Website: www.slazany.eu

Sľažany (Hungarian: Szelezsény) is a village and municipality in Zlaté Moravce District of the Nitra Region, in western-central Slovakia.

== History ==
In historical records the village was first mentioned in 1156.

== Geography ==
The municipality lies at an altitude of 198 metres (650 ft) and covers an area of 16.27 km^{2} (6.28 sq mi) (2025). It is in the northern part of Žitavská pahorkatina (part of the Danubian Lowland).

The Tribeč mountain range is located to the north of the village.

== Population ==
Population statistic (10 years)
Year	1995	2005	2015	2025
Count	1696	1712	1702	1690
Difference		+0.94%	−0.58%	−0.70%

Population statistic
Year	2024	2025
Count	1690	1690
Difference		+1.42%

It has a population of 1690 people (31 December 2025).

=== Ethnicity ===
Census 2021 (1+ %)
Ethnicity	Number	Fraction
Slovak	1638	95.67%
Not found out	70	4.08%
Total	1712	

In year 2021 was 1712 people by ethnicity 1638 as Slovak, 70 as Not found out, 12 as Hungarian, 7 as Czech, 7 as Russian, 1 as Ukrainian, 1 as Silesian, 1 as Rusyn, 1 as German and 1 as Other.

Note on population: The difference values of population numbers in the table "Population statistic" and in the sections "Ethnicity" & "Religion" is caused by the use of various statistical methods.

=== Religion ===
Census 2021 (1+ %)
Religion	Number	Fraction
Roman Catholic Church	1401	81.83%
None	197	11.51%
Not found out	65	3.8%
Total	1712	

In year 2021 was 1712 people by religion 1401 from Roman Catholic Church, 197 from None, 65 from Not found out, 10 from Ad hoc movements, 8 from Greek Catholic Church, 8 from Evangelical Church, 7 from Calvinist Church, 4 from Christian Congregations in Slovakia, 4 from Other, 3 from Eastern Orthodox Church, 2 from Other and not ascertained christian church, 1 from Old Catholic Church, 1 from Paganism and natural spirituality and 1 from Buddhism.

According to the 2019 census, the municipality has a population of about 1685 people. In 2011, 96.7% of inhabitants were Slovaks, 0.65% are Hungarians and 0.24% Czechs. The religious makeup was 90.7% Roman Catholic and 5.6% unaffiliated.
