= Velčice =

Velčice Velséc
- Municipality
- Flag

- Location of Velčice in the Nitra Region Location of Velčice in Slovakia
- Coordinates: 48.42°N 18.31°E
- Country: Slovakia
- Region: Nitra Region
- District: Zlaté Moravce District
- First mentioned: 1232

Area
  - Total: 34.70 km^{2} (13.40 sq mi)
- Elevation: 223 m (732 ft)

Population (2025)
  - Total: 836
- Time zone: UTC+1 (CET)
  - Summer (DST): UTC+2 (CEST)
- Postal code: 951 71
- Area code: +421 37
- Vehicle registration plate (until 2022): ZM
- Website: www.velcice.sk

Velčice (Hungarian: Velséc) is a village and municipality in Zlaté Moravce District of the Nitra Region, in western-central Slovakia.

== History ==
In historical records the village was first mentioned in 1232.

== Geography ==
The municipality lies at an altitude of 223 metres (732 ft) and covers an area of 34.70 km^{2} (13.40 sq mi) (2025).

== Population ==
Population statistic (10 years)
Year	1995	2005	2015	2025
Count	897	841	832	836
Difference		−6.24%	−1.07%	+0.48%

Population statistic
Year	2024	2025
Count	840	836
Difference		−0.47%

It has a population of 836 people (31 December 2025).

=== Ethnicity ===
Census 2021 (1+ %)
Ethnicity	Number	Fraction
Slovak	838	98.47%
Total	851	

In year 2021 was 851 people by ethnicity 838 as Slovak, 6 as Czech, 6 as Not found out, 5 as Hungarian, 5 as Other, 2 as German, 1 as Romani, 1 as Rusyn, 1 as Russian and 1 as Polish.

Note on population: The difference values of population numbers in the table "Population statistic" and in the sections "Ethnicity" & "Religion" is caused by the use of various statistical methods.

=== Religion ===
Census 2021 (1+ %)
Religion	Number	Fraction
Roman Catholic Church	693	81.43%
None	117	13.75%
Evangelical Church	13	1.53%
Total	851	

In year 2021 was 851 people by religion 693 from Roman Catholic Church, 117 from None, 13 from Evangelical Church, 5 from Greek Catholic Church, 4 from Not found out, 4 from Christian Congregations in Slovakia, 4 from Buddhism, 3 from Other, 2 from Calvinist Church, 2 from Paganism and natural spirituality, 1 from Eastern Orthodox Church, 1 from United Methodist Church, 1 from Czechoslovak Hussite Church and 1 from Ad hoc movements.
