= Skýcov =

Skýcov Kicő
- Municipality
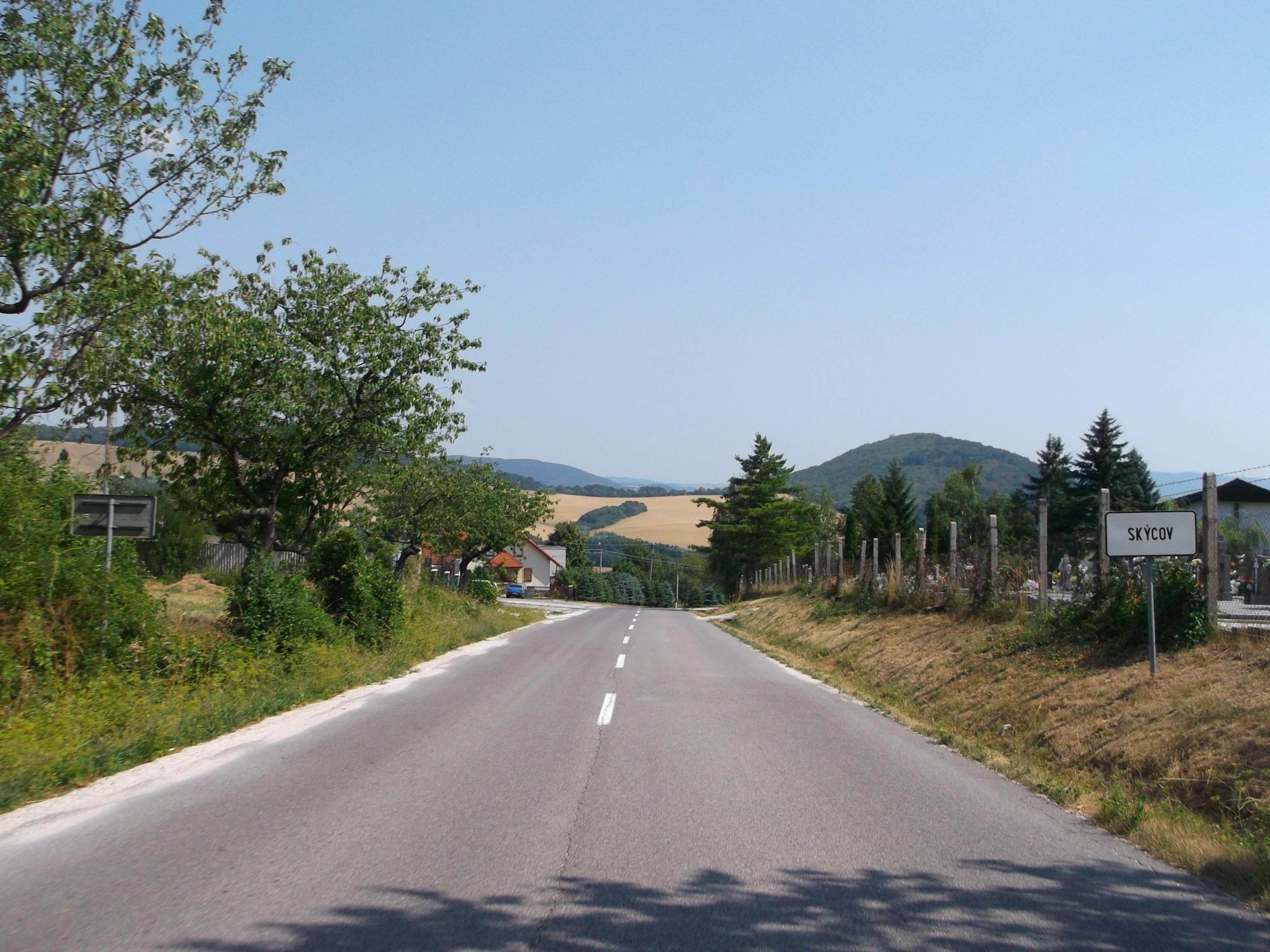

- Flag

- Location of Skýcov in the Nitra Region Location of Skýcov in Slovakia
- Coordinates: 48.50°N 18.42°E
- Country: Slovakia
- Region: Nitra Region
- District: Zlaté Moravce District
- First mentioned: 1359

Area
  - Total: 25.23 km^{2} (9.74 sq mi)
- Elevation: 422 m (1,385 ft)

Population (2025)
  - Total: 944
- Time zone: UTC+1 (CET)
  - Summer (DST): UTC+2 (CEST)
- Postal code: 951 85
- Area code: +421 37
- Vehicle registration plate (until 2022): ZM
- Website: www.skycov.sk

Skýcov (Hungarian: Kicő) is a municipality (village) in the Zlaté Moravce District, Nitra Region, Slovakia. It is located between the towns of Partizánske and Zlaté Moravce, in the Tribeč mountains.

== Geography ==
The municipality lies at an altitude of 422 metres (1,385 ft) and covers an area of 25.23 km^{2} (9.74 sq mi) (2025).

== Population ==
Population statistic (10 years)
Year	1995	2005	2015	2025
Count	1073	1038	981	944
Difference		−3.26%	−5.49%	−3.77%

Population statistic
Year	2024	2025
Count	936	944
Difference		+0.85%

It has a population of 944 people (31 December 2025).

=== Ethnicity ===
Census 2021 (1+ %)
Ethnicity	Number	Fraction
Slovak	921	97.15%
Not found out	23	2.42%
Total	948	

In year 2021 was 948 people by ethnicity 921 as Slovak, 23 as Not found out, 7 as Czech, 7 as Hungarian, 1 as Italian, 1 as Romani, 1 as Rusyn, 1 as Russian, 1 as German, 1 as Moravian and 1 as Other.

Note on population: The difference values of population numbers in the table "Population statistic" and in the sections "Ethnicity" & "Religion" is caused by the use of various statistical methods.

=== Religion ===
Census 2021 (1+ %)
Religion	Number	Fraction
Roman Catholic Church	774	81.65%
None	128	13.5%
Not found out	16	1.69%
Total	948	

In year 2021 was 948 people by religion 774 from Roman Catholic Church, 128 from None, 16 from Not found out, 8 from Greek Catholic Church, 8 from Evangelical Church, 5 from Christian Congregations in Slovakia, 4 from Calvinist Church, 1 from Paganism and natural spirituality, 1 from Other and not ascertained christian church, 1 from Other, 1 from Buddhism and 1 from Ad hoc movements.
