= Žitavany =

Žitavany Zsitvaapáti
- Municipality
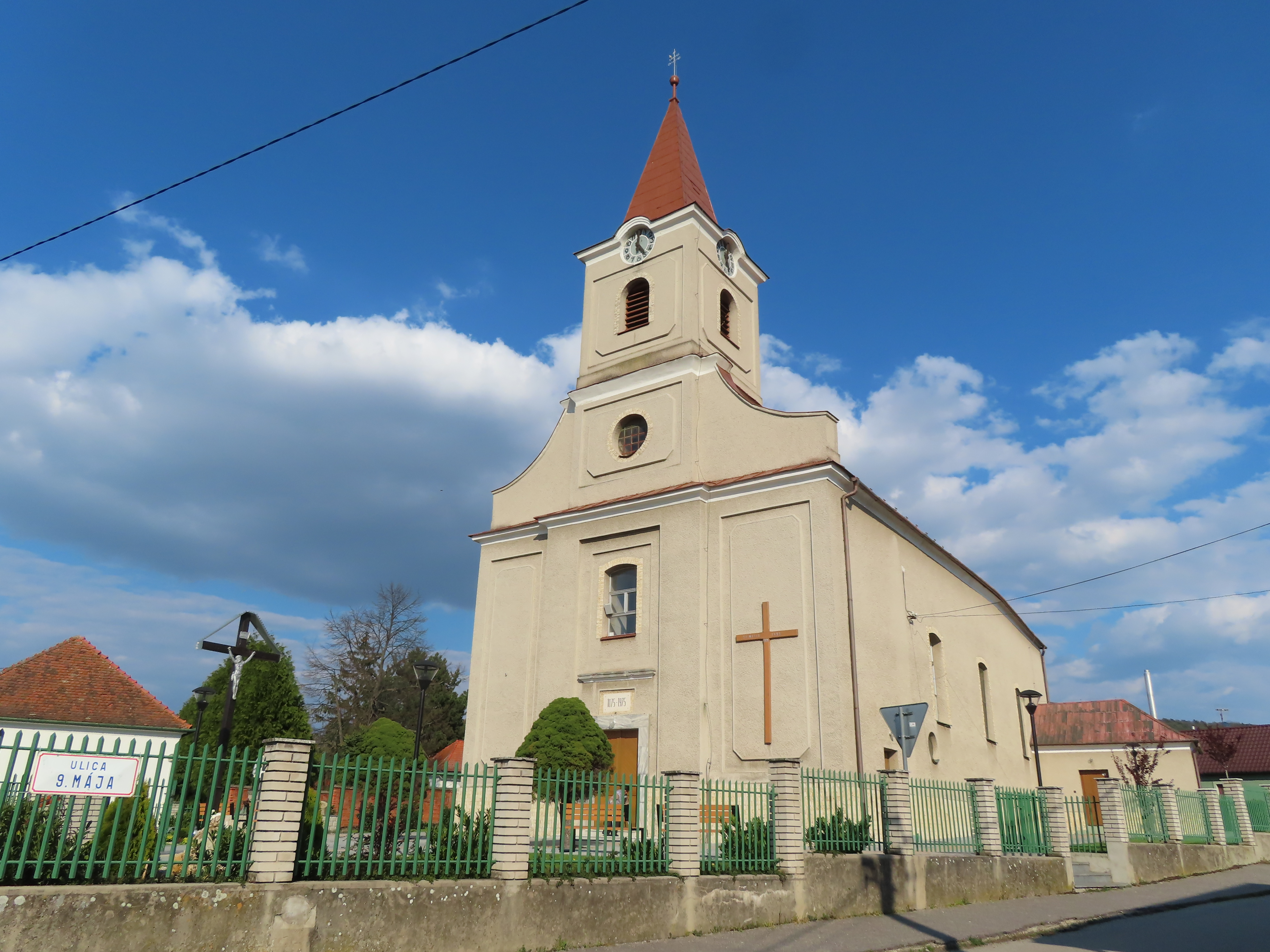

- Flag

- Location of Žitavany in the Nitra Region Location of Žitavany in Slovakia
- Coordinates: 48.40°N 18.42°E
- Country: Slovakia
- Region: Nitra Region
- District: Zlaté Moravce District
- First mentioned: 1075

Area
  - Total: 0.00 km^{2} (0 sq mi)
- Elevation: 204 m (669 ft)

Population (2025)
  - Total: 1,797
- Time zone: UTC+1 (CET)
  - Summer (DST): UTC+2 (CEST)
- Postal code: 951 97
- Area code: +421 37
- Vehicle registration plate (until 2022): ZM
- Website: www.zitavany.sk

Žitavany (Hungarian: Zsitvaapáti) is a village and municipality in Zlaté Moravce District of the Nitra Region, in western-central Slovakia. The municipality had 1874 inhabitants in 2011.

== Geography ==
The municipality lies at an altitude of 204 metres (669 ft) and covers an area of 0.00 km^{2} (0 sq mi) (2025).

== Population ==
Population statistic (10 years)
Year	1995	2005	2015	2025
Count	0	1832	1926	1797
Difference		–	+5.13%	−6.69%

Population statistic
Year	2024	2025
Count	1804	1797
Difference		−0.38%

It has a population of 1797 people (31 December 2025).

=== Ethnicity ===
Census 2021 (1+ %)
Ethnicity	Number	Fraction
Slovak	1722	92.53%
Not found out	133	7.14%
Total	1861	

In year 2021 was 1861 people by ethnicity 1722 as Slovak, 133 as Not found out, 6 as Czech, 3 as Russian, 3 as Hungarian, 2 as Vietnamese, 2 as Polish, 2 as Other, 2 as English, 1 as Ukrainian and 1 as German.

Note on population: The difference values of population numbers in the table "Population statistic" and in the sections "Ethnicity" & "Religion" is caused by the use of various statistical methods.

=== Religion ===
Census 2021 (1+ %)
Religion	Number	Fraction
Roman Catholic Church	1442	77.49%
None	246	13.22%
Not found out	128	6.88%
Total	1861	

In year 2021 was 1861 people by religion 1442 from Roman Catholic Church, 246 from None, 128 from Not found out, 18 from Evangelical Church, 6 from Christian Congregations in Slovakia, 5 from Other, 4 from Ad hoc movements, 3 from Other and not ascertained christian church, 2 from Old Catholic Church, 2 from Calvinist Church, 2 from Jehovah's Witnesses, 1 from Eastern Orthodox Church, 1 from Paganism and natural spirituality and 1 from Buddhism.
