= Nevidzany, Zlaté Moravce District =

Nevidzany district Zlaté Moravce Néved
- Municipality
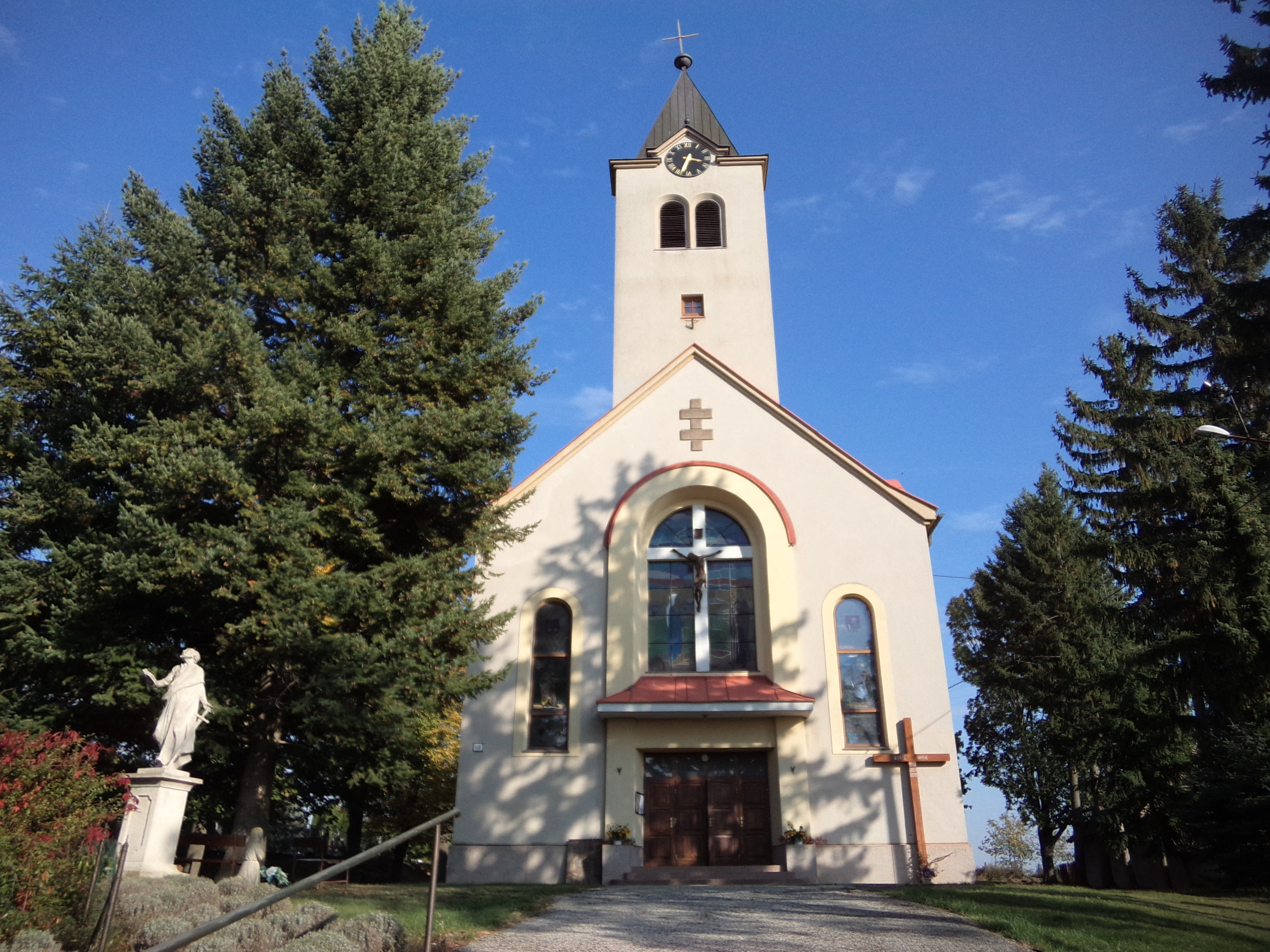

- Flag

- Location of Nevidzany district Zlaté Moravce in the Nitra Region Location of Nevidzany district Zlaté Moravce in Slovakia
- Coordinates: 48.2875°N 18.3777°E
- Country: Slovakia
- Region: Nitra Region
- District: Zlaté Moravce District
- First mentioned: 1229

Area
  - Total: 10.25 km^{2} (3.96 sq mi)
- Elevation: 179 m (587 ft)

Population (2025)
  - Total: 556
- Time zone: UTC+1 (CET)
  - Summer (DST): UTC+2 (CEST)
- Postal code: 951 62
- Area code: +421 37
- Vehicle registration plate (until 2022): ZM
- Website: www.obecnevidzany.sk

Nevidzany (Hungarian: Néved) is a village and municipality in Zlaté Moravce District of the Nitra Region, in western-central Slovakia.

== History ==
In historical records the village was first mentioned in 1229.

== Geography ==
The municipality lies at an altitude of 179 metres (587 ft) and covers an area of 10.25 km^{2} (3.96 sq mi) (2025).

== Population ==
Population statistic (10 years)
Year	1995	2005	2015	2025
Count	638	616	590	556
Difference		−3.44%	−4.22%	−5.76%

Population statistic
Year	2024	2025
Count	560	556
Difference		−0.71%

It has a population of 556 people (31 December 2025).

=== Ethnicity ===
Census 2021 (1+ %)
Ethnicity	Number	Fraction
Slovak	564	96.74%
Not found out	17	2.91%
Hungarian	6	1.02%
Total	583	

In year 2021 was 583 people by ethnicity 564 as Slovak, 17 as Not found out, 6 as Hungarian and 1 as Other.

Note on population: The difference values of population numbers in the table "Population statistic" and in the sections "Ethnicity" & "Religion" is caused by the use of various statistical methods.

=== Religion ===
Census 2021 (1+ %)
Religion	Number	Fraction
Roman Catholic Church	502	86.11%
None	45	7.72%
Not found out	20	3.43%
Greek Catholic Church	6	1.03%
Total	583	

In year 2021 was 583 people by religion 502 from Roman Catholic Church, 45 from None, 20 from Not found out, 6 from Greek Catholic Church, 5 from Evangelical Church, 2 from Ad hoc movements, 1 from Christian Congregations in Slovakia, 1 from Other and 1 from Buddhism.
