= Hosťovce, Zlaté Moravce District =

Hosťovce district Zlaté Moravce Gesztőd
- Municipality
- Flag

- Location of Hosťovce district Zlaté Moravce in the Nitra Region Location of Hosťovce district Zlaté Moravce in Slovakia
- Coordinates: 48°25′N 18°21′E
- Country: Slovakia
- Region: Nitra Region
- District: Zlaté Moravce District
- First mentioned: 1209

Area
  - Total: 16.23 km^{2} (6.27 sq mi)
- Elevation: 213 m (699 ft)

Population (2025)
  - Total: 712
- Time zone: UTC+1 (CET)
  - Summer (DST): UTC+2 (CEST)
- Postal code: 951 91
- Area code: +421 37
- Vehicle registration plate (until 2022): ZM
- Website: www.obechostovce.sk

Hosťovce (Hungarian: Gesztőd) is a village and municipality in the Zlaté Moravce District of the Nitra Region, in western-central Slovakia.

== See also ==
- List of municipalities and towns in Slovakia

== Population ==
Population statistic (10 years)
Year	1995	2005	2015	2025
Count	761	765	763	712
Difference		+0.52%	−0.26%	−6.68%

Population statistic
Year	2024	2025
Count	719	712
Difference		−0.97%

It has a population of 712 people (31 December 2025).

=== Ethnicity ===
Census 2021 (1+ %)
Ethnicity	Number	Fraction
Slovak	706	94.13%
Not found out	40	5.33%
Total	750	

In year 2021 was 750 people by ethnicity 706 as Slovak, 40 as Not found out, 6 as Romani, 4 as Czech, 4 as Hungarian, 2 as Italian, 2 as Russian, 1 as Moravian and 1 as Other.

Note on population: The difference values of population numbers in the table "Population statistic" and in the sections "Ethnicity" & "Religion" is caused by the use of various statistical methods.

=== Religion ===
Census 2021 (1+ %)
Religion	Number	Fraction
Roman Catholic Church	579	77.2%
None	120	16%
Not found out	39	5.2%
Total	750	

In year 2021 was 750 people by religion 579 from Roman Catholic Church, 120 from None, 39 from Not found out, 4 from Evangelical Church, 2 from Other and not ascertained christian church, 2 from Christian Congregations in Slovakia, 2 from Ad hoc movements, 1 from Paganism and natural spirituality and 1 from Buddhism.

== Genealogical resources ==
The records for genealogical research are available at the state archive "Statny Archiv in Nitra, Slovakia"

- Roman Catholic church records (births/marriages/deaths): 1723-1894 (parish B)
- Lutheran church records (births/marriages/deaths): 1827-1894 (parish B)
