= Janssen (lunar crater) =

Crater on the Moon

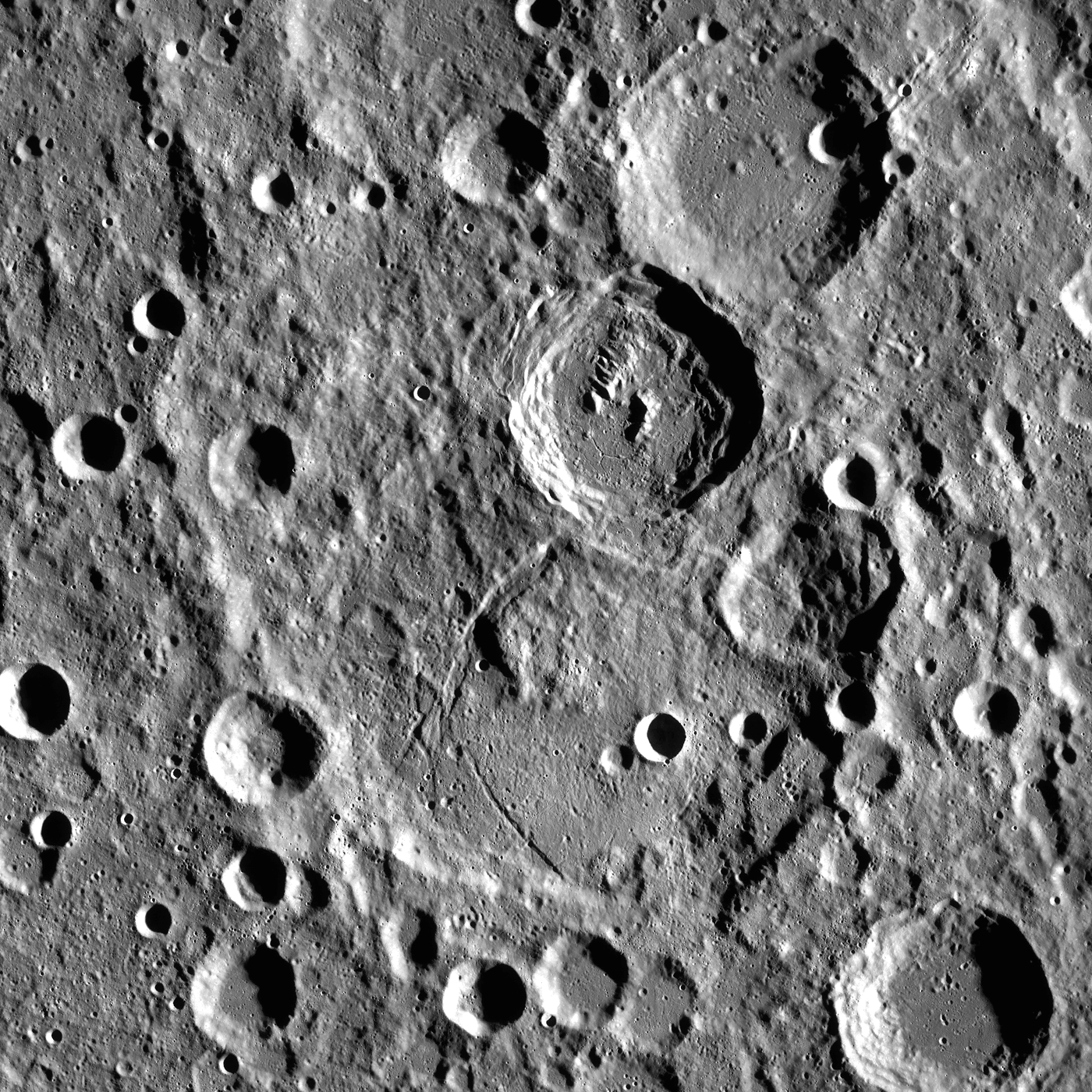
- Lunar Reconnaissance Orbiter image
- Coordinates: 44.96°S 40.82°E
- Diameter: 201 km
- Depth: 2.9 km
- Colongitude: 320° at sunrise
- Formation: Pre-Nectarian
- Eponym: Pierre J. C. Janssen

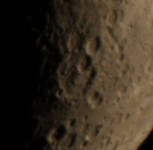
Janssen at center, near the terminator as viewed from Earth

Janssen is an ancient impact crater located in the highland region near the southeastern lunar limb. It dates to the Pre-Nectarian period of the lunar geologic timescale. The entire structure has been heavily worn and is marked by many lesser crater impacts. The outer wall is breached in multiple locations, but the outline of the crater rim can still be observed. The wall forms a distinctive hexagonal shape upon the rugged lunar surface, with a slight curvature at the vertices.

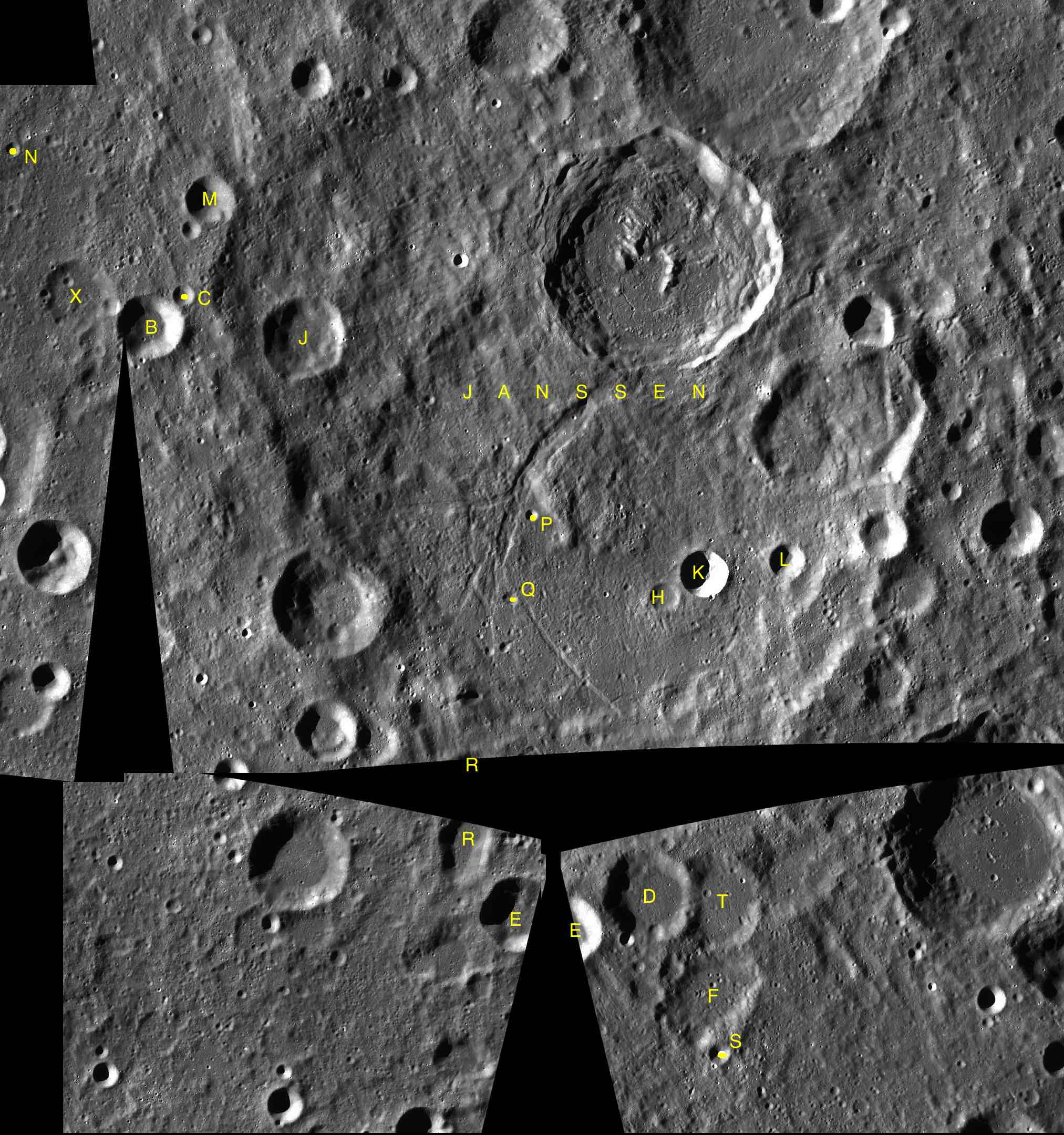
Satellite craters of Janssen

The crater is named after French astronomer Pierre Jules César Janssen.

The prominent crater Fabricius lies entirely within the outer wall, in the northeast quadrant of the floor. A number of other lesser, but still notable craters mark the crater floor. Connected to the northeast rim is Metius, and to the north is the heavily worn Brenner. Southeast of Janssen are the co-joined craters Steinheil and Watt. Astride the southwest wall is the smaller Lockyer. Further to the east, although appearing nearby due to elongation, is the huge Vallis Rheita.

In the southern two-thirds of Janssen can be discerned the remains of a large, concentric crater, the wall of which is overlaid by Fabricius. The floor of this inner depression contains a rille system named the Rimae Janssen. The rille curves from the rim of Fabricius to the southeast of the outer wall of Janssen, extending for a distance of up to 140 kilometers.

== Janssen during full moon ==
In this heavily cratered region which was called Terra Fertilitatis by Giovanni Battista Riccioli, the formation Janssen is hard to detect, especially during full moon. A handy guide for telescopic observers of the full moon is the bright bowl shaped crater Janssen K at the southeastern section of Janssen's floor. In this region, high albedo crater Janssen K is an eye-catcher. The brightness of Janssen K is also noticeable on the photographic version of chart LAC 114 (page 228) in The Clementine Atlas of the Moon (Ben Bussey / Paul D. Spudis).

== Satellite craters ==
By convention these features are identified on lunar maps by placing the letter on the side of the crater midpoint that is closest to Janssen.

Janssen	Coordinates	Diameter, km
B	43.17°S 34.37°E	21
C	42.89°S 34.91°E	7
D	48.65°S 41.22°E	29
E	48.82°S 39.77°E	24
F	49.82°S 41.92°E	35
H	46.43°S 41.71°E	10
J	43.44°S 36.58°E	27
K	46.19°S 42.31°E	15
L	46.09°S 43.58°E	12
M	41.90°S 35.44°E	16
N	41.43°S 32.12°E	5
P	45.50°S 39.76°E	4
Q	46.35°S 39.36°E	5
R	48.28°S 38.70°E	23
S	50.42°S 41.83°E	7
T	48.88°S 42.31°E	29
X	42.93°S 33.27°E	24
