= Johannes Fabricius =

German astronomer

Johann Goldsmid, better known by his Latinized name Johann(es) Fabricius (8 January 1587 – 19 March 1616), eldest son of David Fabricius (1564–1617), was a Frisian astronomer and a modern era discoverer of sunspots in 1611, preceded by Thomas Harriot and followed by Galileo Galilei.

== Biography ==
Johannes was born in Resterhafe (East Friesland). He studied at the University of Helmstedt, Wittenberg University and graduated from Leiden University in 1611. He returned from university in the Netherlands with telescopes that he and his father turned on the Sun. Despite the difficulties of observing the Sun directly with a telescope, they noted the existence of sunspots, one of the first confirmed instance of such observations telescopically; sunspots had first been identified without telescopes in ancient China and Greece. Johannes first observed a sunspot on February 27, 1611; in Wittenberg in that year he published the results of his observations in his 22-page pamphlet De Maculis in Sole observatis..... It was the first publication on the topic of sunspots.

The pair soon used camera obscura telescopy so as to save their eyes and get a better view of the solar disk, and observed that the spots moved. They would appear on the eastern edge of the disk, steadily move to the western edge, disappear, then reappear at the east again after the same amount of time that it had taken for it to cross the disk in the first place.

He is also mentioned in Jules Verne's 1865 novel From the Earth to the Moon as someone who claimed to have seen lunar inhabitants through his telescope, though that particular fact is merely part of Verne's fiction. The large (90-kilometre or 56-mile) Fabricius crater, on the Moon's southern hemisphere, is named after his father, David Fabricius.

He died in Marienhafe, at the age of 29.

== Legacy ==
In 1895, a monument was erected to his memory in the churchyard at Osteel, where his father had been pastor from 1603 until 1616.

== Work ==
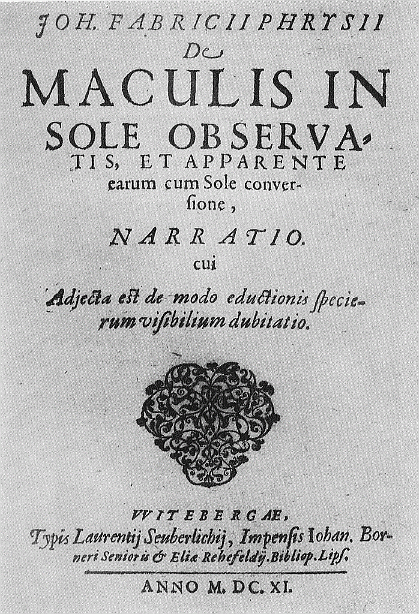
Title page of De Maculis in sole observatis et apparente earum cum Sole conversione, Narratio (1611).

- Joh. Fabricii Phrysii De Maculis in Sole observatis, et apparente earum cum Sole conversione, Narratio, etc. Witebergae, Anno M.DC.XI. (year 1611).
