= Biela (crater) =

Lunar impact crater

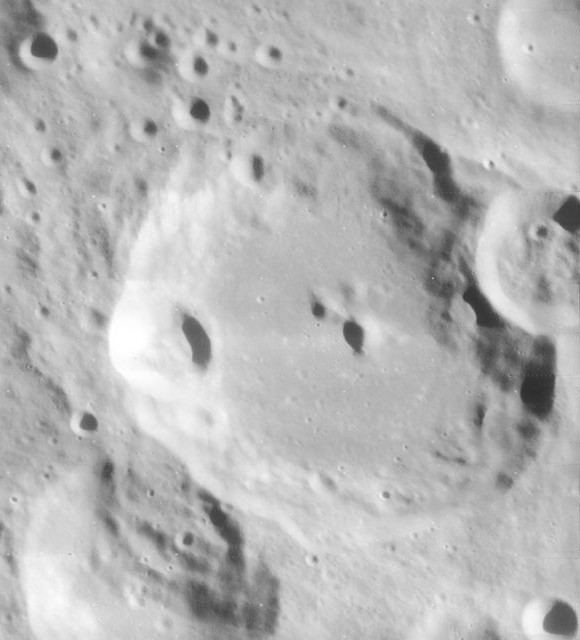
- Lunar Orbiter 4 image
- Coordinates: 54.9°S 51.3°E
- Diameter: 77.03 km (47.86 mi)
- Depth: 3.1 km (1.9 mi)
- Colongitude: 310° at sunrise
- Eponym: Wilhelm von Biela

Biela is a lunar impact crater that is located in the rugged highlands of the southeastern Moon, close to the limb. The crater lies to the east of Rosenberger, to the southeast of the Watt–Steinheil double crater.

The rim of this crater is overlaid by a pair of small but notable craters: Biela C across the northeast rim and Biela W along the western inner wall. The satellite crater Biela B is attached to the southwestern outer rim, and ejecta from Biela covers the northwestern part of the interior. Despite a certain degree of wear, the rim of Biela remains relatively well-defined, especially in the southeast. The interior floor is flat and not marked by any craterlets of note. There is a central peak formation of three ridges located just to the northeast of the midpoint.

This formation is named after Austrian astronomer Wilhelm von Biela (1782-1856). The name was incorporated into lunar nomenclature by the German astronomer Johann Mädler during the 19th century. Its designation was officially adopted by the International Astronomical Union in 1935.

== Satellite craters ==
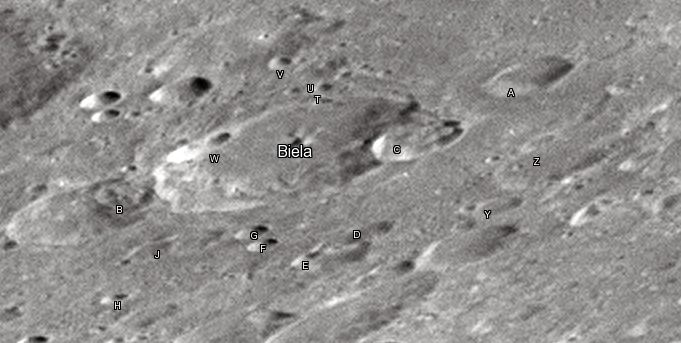
Biela crater and its satellite craters taken from Earth in 2012 at the University of Hertfordshire's Bayfordbury Observatory with the telescopes Meade LX200 14" and Lumenera Skynyx 2-1

By convention these features are identified on lunar maps by placing the letter on the side of the crater midpoint that is closest to Biela.

Biela	Latitude	Longitude	Diameter
A	52.9° S	53.3° E	26 km
B	56.5° S	49.6° E	43 km
C	54.3° S	53.5° E	26 km
D	55.8° S	56.3° E	14 km
E	56.4° S	56.3° E	8 km
F	56.3° S	54.5° E	9 km
G	56.2° S	53.9° E	10 km
H	57.9° S	54.2° E	8 km
J	57.0° S	52.9° E	14 km
T	53.8° S	49.9° E	7 km
U	53.4° S	49.0° E	16 km
V	53.6° S	48.5° E	6 km
W	55.1° S	49.6° E	16 km
Y	54.9° S	58.0° E	15 km
Z	53.8° S	57.0° E	48 km
