= Paul Christian =

Paul Christian may refer to:

- A pen name of the nineteenth-century occult author Jean-Baptiste Pitois
- Paul Hubschmid, used this screen name
- Pablo Christiani, a Jewish convert to Roman Catholicism
- Paul Christian (comics), a supervillain from DC Comics
