= David Fabricius =

German pastor and astronomer

David Fabricius (9 March 1564 – 7 May 1617) was a Frisian pastor who made two major discoveries in the early days of telescopic astronomy, jointly with his eldest son, Johannes Fabricius (1587–1615).

David Fabricius (Latinization of his proper name David Faber, or David Goldschmidt; possibly Hebrew) was born at Esens, studied at the University of Helmstedt starting in 1583 and served as pastor for small towns near his birthplace in Frisia (now northwest Germany and northeast Netherlands), at Resterhafe near Dornum in 1584 and at Osteel in 1603. As was common for Protestant ministers of the day, he dabbled in science: his particular interest was astronomy. Fabricius corresponded with astronomer Johannes Kepler.

== Scientific work ==
Fabricius discovered the first known periodic variable star (as opposed to cataclysmic variables, such as novas and supernovas), Mira, in August 1596. At first he believed it to be "just" another nova, as the whole concept of a recurring variable did not exist at the time. When he saw Mira brighten again in 1609, however, it became clear that a new kind of object had been discovered in the sky.

Two years later, his son Johannes Fabricius (1587–1615) returned from university in the Netherlands with telescopes that they turned on the Sun. Despite the difficulties of observing the Sun directly, they noted the existence of sunspots, the first confirmed instance of their observation (though unclear statements in East Asian annals suggest that Chinese astronomers may have discovered them with the naked eye previously, and Fabricius may have noticed them himself without a telescope a few years before). The pair soon invented camera obscura telescopy so as to save their eyes and get a better view of the solar disk, and observed that the spots moved. They would appear on the eastern edge of the disk, steadily move to the western edge, disappear, then reappear at the east again after the passage of the same amount of time that it had taken for it to cross the disk in the first place. This suggested that the Sun rotated on its axis, which had been postulated before but never backed up with evidence. Johannes then published Maculis in Sole Observatis, et Apparente earum cum Sole Conversione Narratio ("Narration on Spots Observed on the Sun and their Apparent Rotation with the Sun") in June 1611. Unfortunately, after Johannes Fabricius's early death at the age of 29, the book remained obscure and was eclipsed by the independent discoveries of and publications about sunspots by Christoph Scheiner and Galileo Galilei, few months later.

== Death ==
After Fabricius denounced a local goose thief from the pulpit at Osteel in 1617, the accused man struck him on the head with a shovel and killed him.

== Legacy ==
Copies of a map he made of Frisia in 1589 are also still extant. He is name-checked in Giacomo Leopardi's 1824 "Dialogue Between the Earth and the Moon" as well as in Jules Verne's 1865 novel From the Earth to the Moon as someone who claimed to have seen lunar inhabitants through his telescope, though the origin of such a claim in both cases is fictional. The large (79-kilometer) crater Fabricius in the Moon's southern hemisphere is named after David Fabricius. In 1895 a monument was erected to his memory in the churchyard at Osteel where he was pastor from 1603 until 1617.
