= Émile Bayard =

French illustrator (1837–1891)

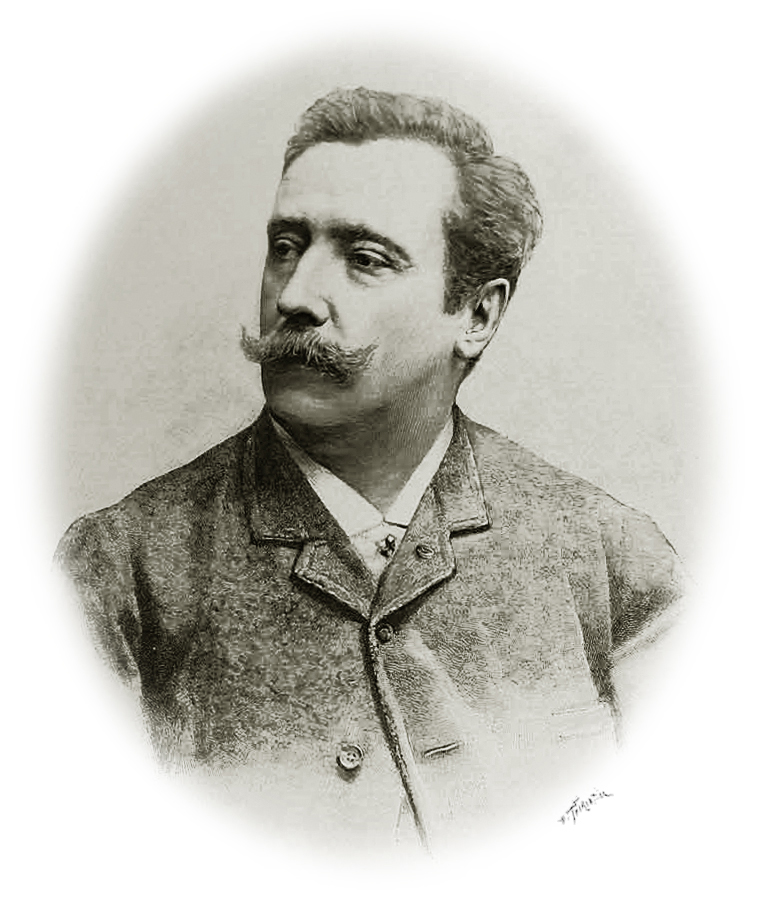
- Bayard, December 1891
- Born: Émile-Antoine Bayard; 2 November 1837; La Ferté-sous-Jouarre, Seine-et-Marne, France
- Died: 6 December 1891 (aged 54); Cairo, Egypt
- Other names: Abel De Miray
- Occupation: Illustrator
- Years active: 1853–1891
- Known for: Illustration of Cosette from Les Misérables by Victor Hugo

Émile-Antoine Bayard (2 November 1837 – 6 December 1891) was a French illustrator born in La Ferté-sous-Jouarre, Seine-et-Marne. A student of Léon Cogniet, he is known for illustrating Victor Hugo's 1862 novel Les Misérables.

== Career ==
Starting in 1853, Bayard was a student of Cogniet for five years, publishing his first cartoons at the age of fifteen, often using the anagrammatic pseudonym, Abel De Miray.

Between 1857 and 1864, he worked in the mediums of charcoal drawings, paintings, watercolors, woodcuts, engravings, and lithographs. In 1864, he began to work primarily for magazines, and illustrated current events such as the Franco-Prussian War of 1870–71.

At the end of the 19th century, with a growing interest in photography displacing documentary drawing, Bayard moved to illustrating novels, including Les Misérables by Victor Hugo, Uncle Tom's Cabin by Harriet Beecher Stowe, L'Immortel by Alphonse Daudet, "Robinson Crusoé by Daniel De Foë, and From the Earth to the Moon by Jules Verne. His illustration of Cosette from Les Misérables was adapted for the logo from the Cameron Mackintosh musical.

== Space art ==
While there had been art depicting spaceflight and alien worlds prior to 1865, they were based heavily on mysticism as opposed to science. Bayard's artwork accompanying From the Earth to the Moon by Jules Verne is considered among the first Space art of a scientific nature.

== Gallery ==
Works by Émile Bayard

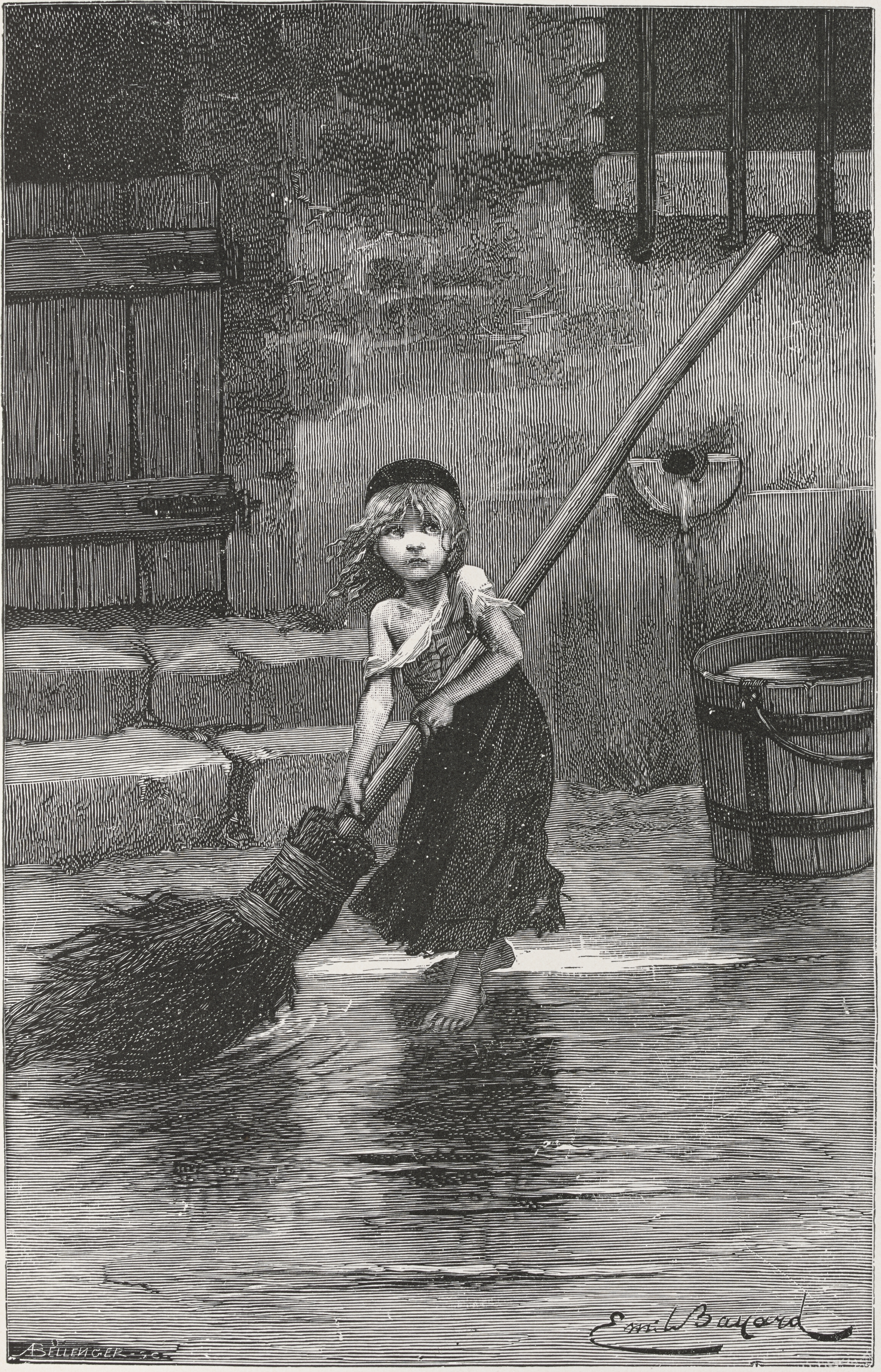
Illustration of Cosette from Les Misérables by Victor Hugo. This image was used on posters promoting the musical version of Les Misérables.

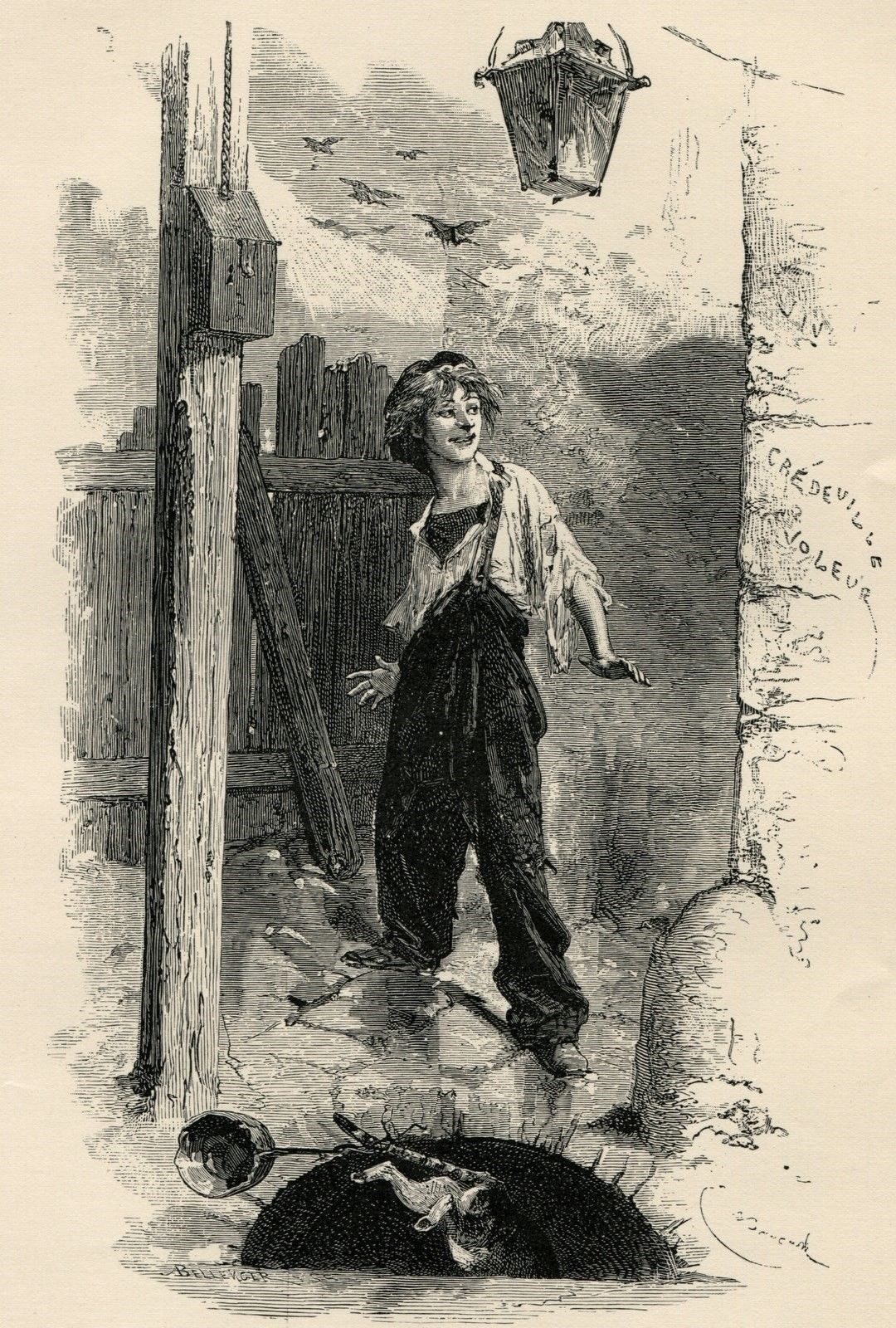
Illustration of Gavroche from Les Misérables by Victor Hugo

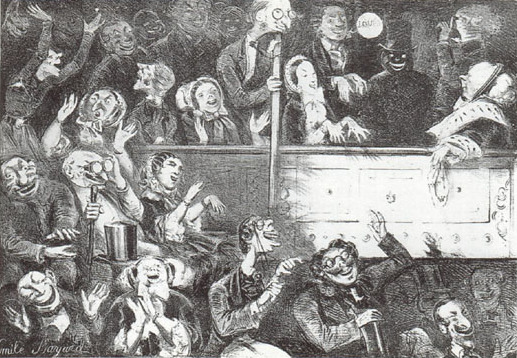
The audience at the Théâtre des Bouffes-Parisiens, the birthplace of Jacques Offenbach's operettas. Caricature of 1860.

Illustration of scene from As You Like It by William Shakespeare

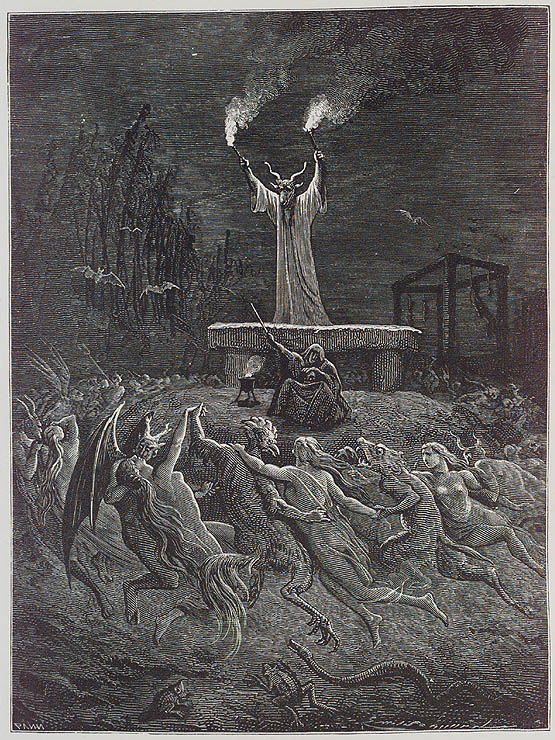
The Dance of the Witches' Sabbath: illustration from History of Magic by Jean-Baptiste Pitois (a.k.a. Paul Christian), Paris, 1870

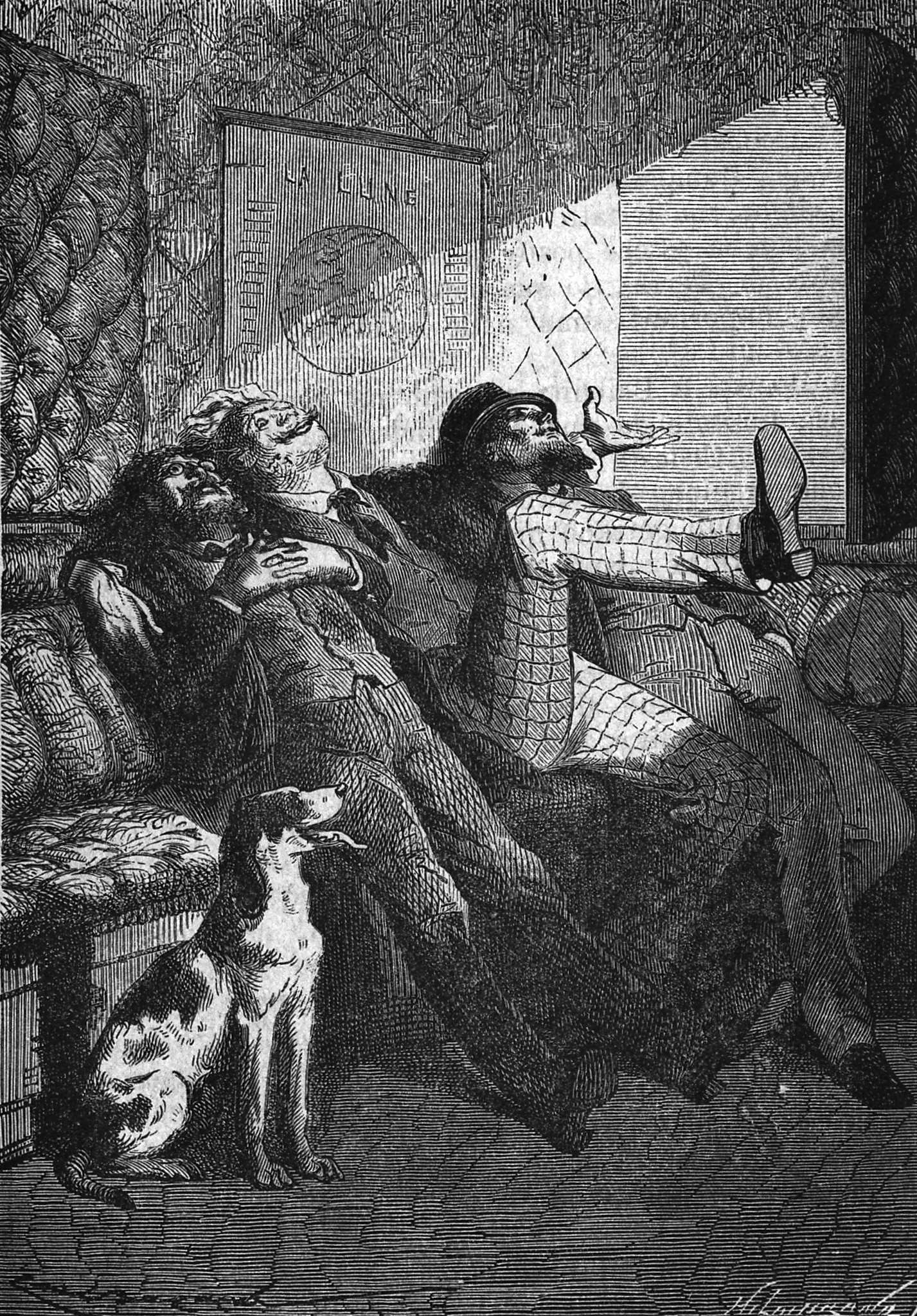
An illustration from Jules Verne's novel "Around the Moon" drawn by and Alphonse de Neuville, September 16, 1872, "The Christening" oil on canvas by Émile Bayard in 1863 (Émile-Antoine Bayard The Christening).

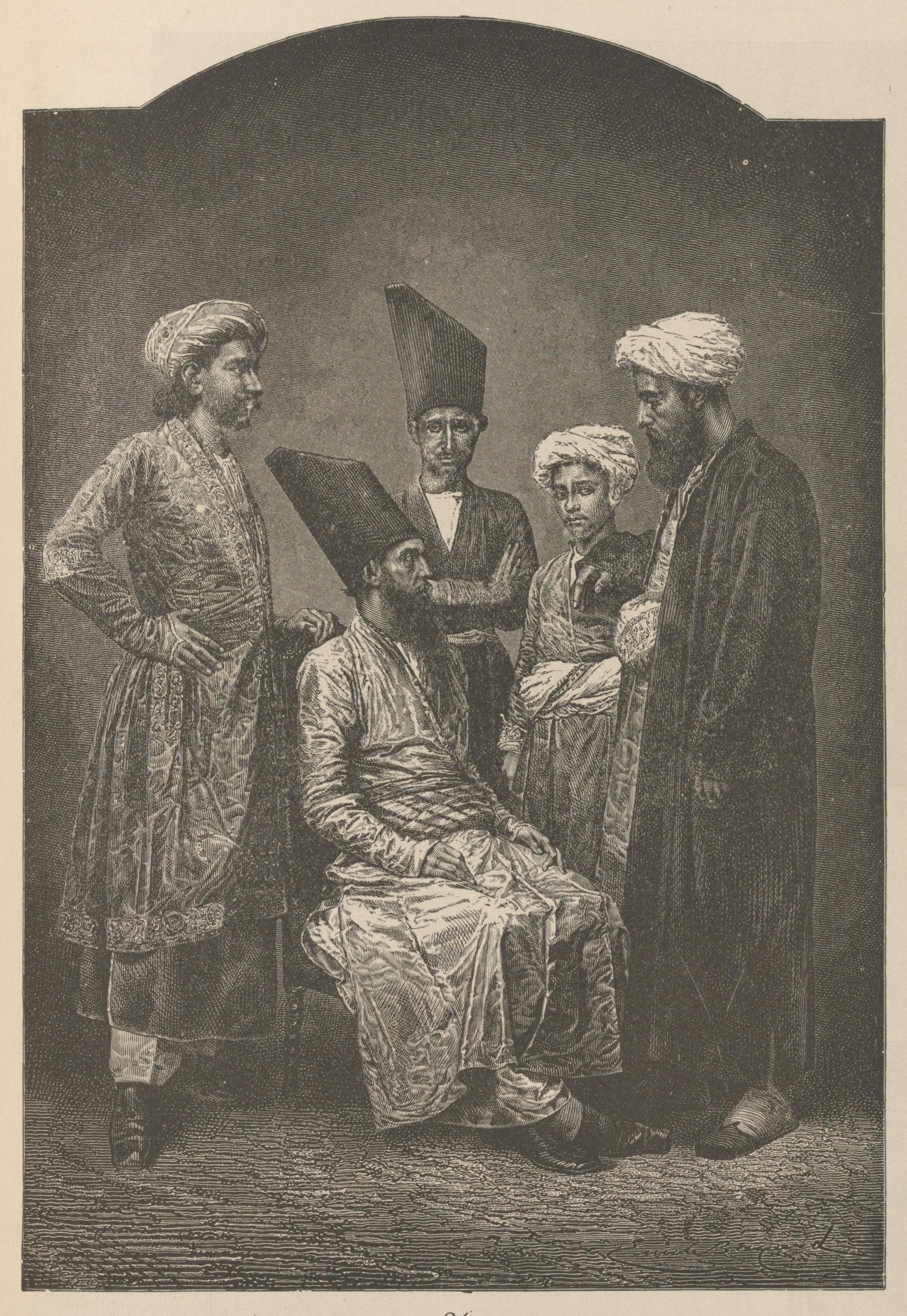
Persians in Bombay, 1873

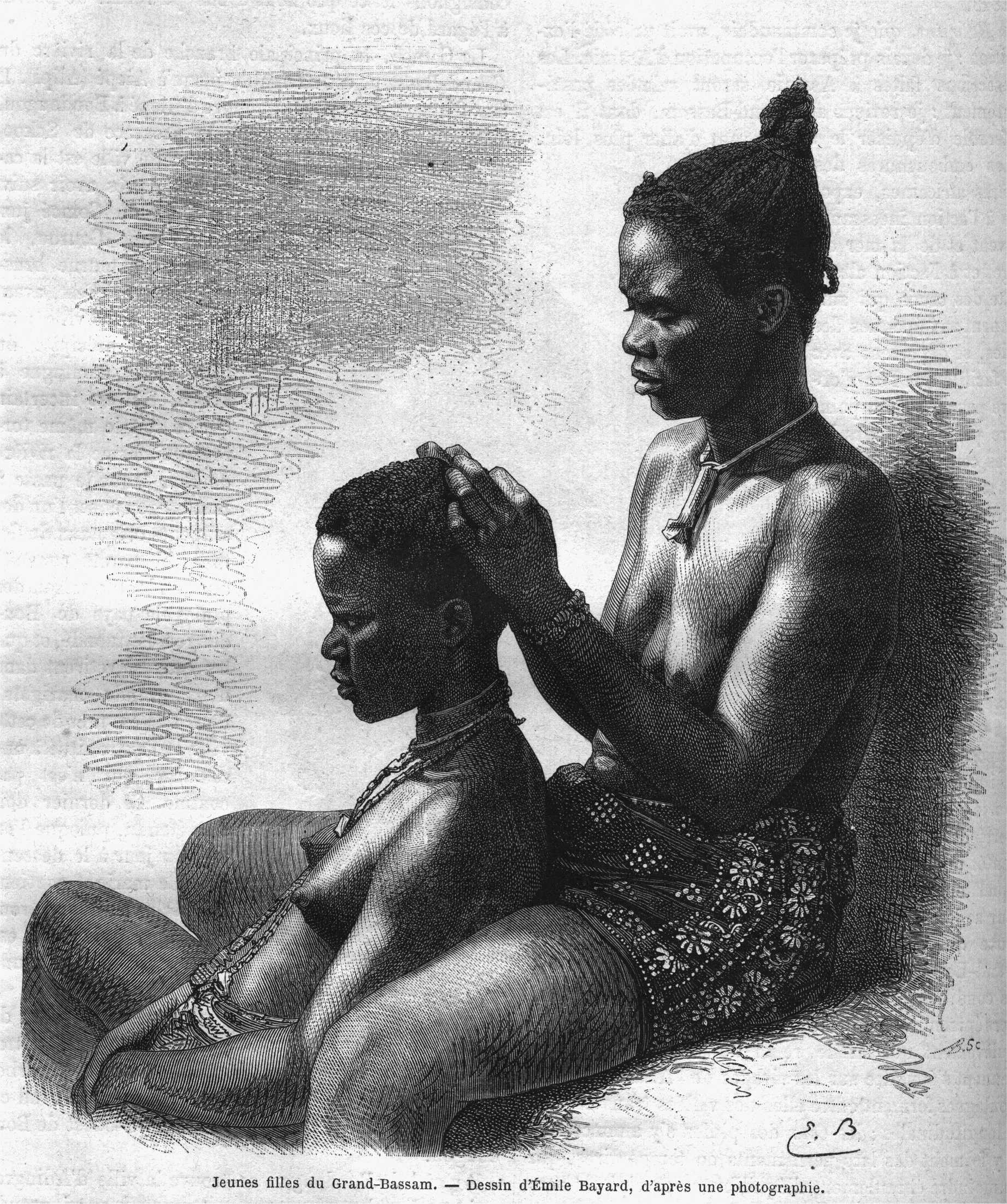
Young girls from Grand-Bassam drawn by Émile Bayard from a photograph, 1869

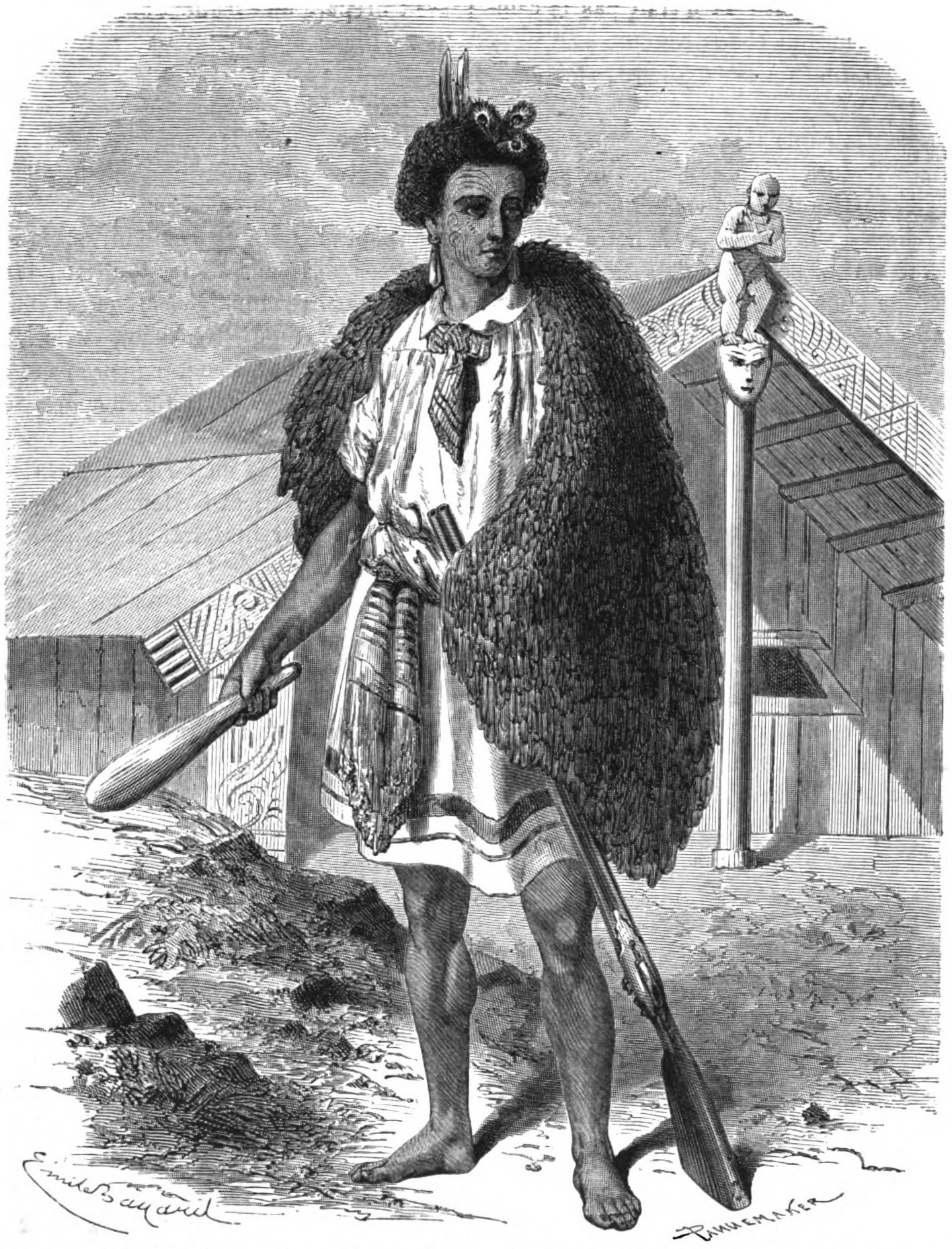
Illustration of Māori monarch Tāwhiao as a young man (then known as Matutaera)
