= Around the Moon =

1869 novel by Jules Verne

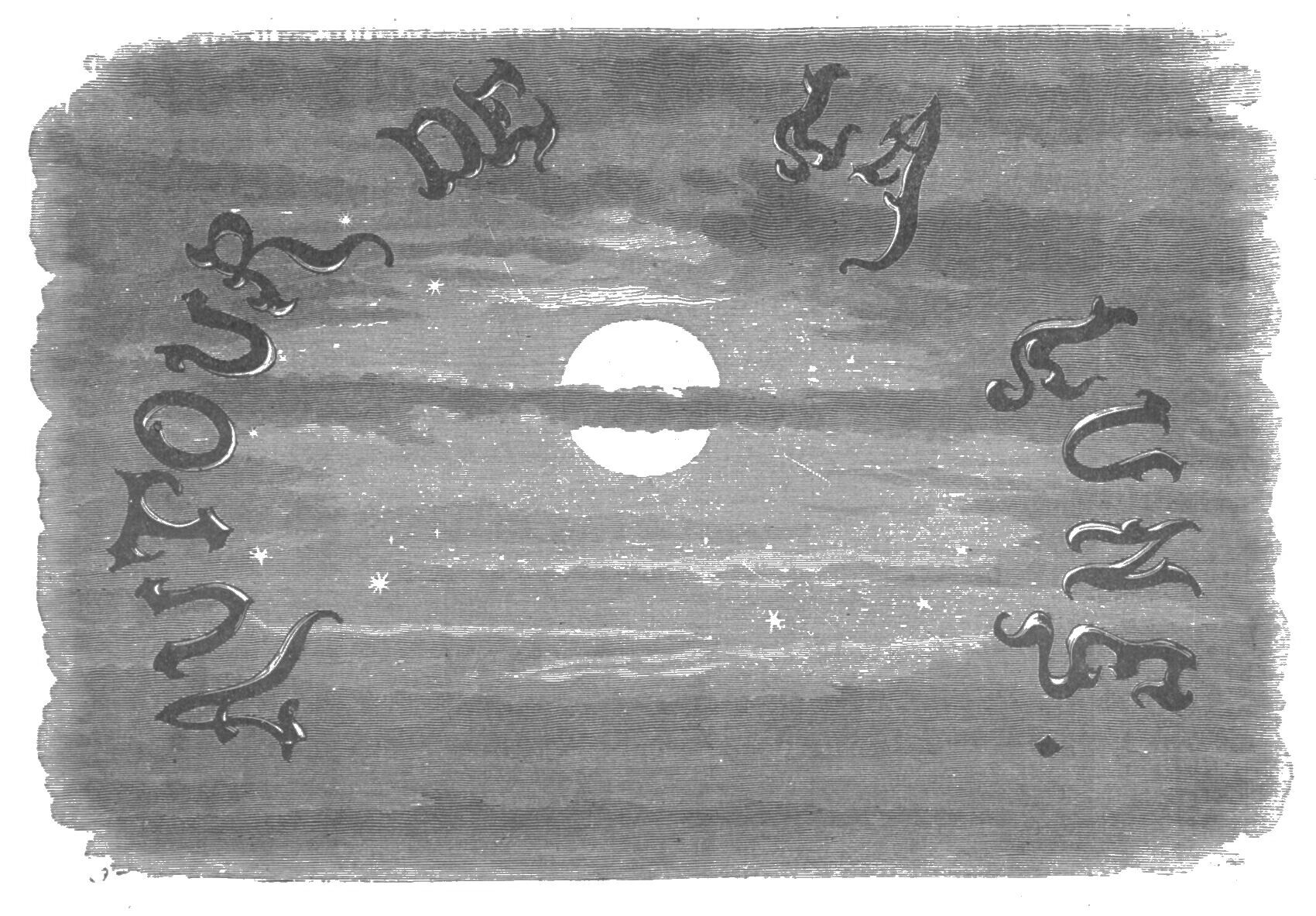
- Author: Jules Verne
- Original title: Autour de la Lune
- Translator: Louis Mercier & Eleanor E. King (1873); Edward Roth (1874); Thomas H. Linklater (1877); I. O. Evans (1959), Jacqueline and Robert Baldick (1970), Harold Salemson (1970), William Butcher (2025)
- Illustrator: Émile-Antoine Bayard and Alphonse-Marie de Neuville
- Language: French
- Series: The Extraordinary Voyages #7; Baltimore Gun Club #2
- Genre: Science fiction novel
- Publisher: Pierre-Jules Hetzel
- Publication date: 1869
- Publication place: France
- English publication date: 1873
- Media type: Print (Hardback)
- Preceded by: Twenty Thousand Leagues Under the Seas
- Followed by: A Floating City
- Text: Around the Moon at Wikisource

Around the Moon (French: Autour de la Lune, 1869), also translated as Circling the Moon and All Around the Moon, is the sequel to Jules Verne's 1865 novel, From the Earth to the Moon. It is a science fiction tale which continues the trip to the Moon that was only begun in the first novel. Later English editions sometimes combined the two under the title From the Earth to the Moon and Around It. There are two modern unabridged English translations by Frederick Paul Walter (2010) and David Petault (2024) (trad IA).

From the Earth to the Moon and Around the Moon served as the basis for the 1902 film A Trip to the Moon by French director Georges Méliès.

== Plot ==
Having been fired out of the giant Columbiad space gun, the Baltimore Gun Club's bullet-shaped projectile, along with its three passengers, Barbicane, Nicholl and Michel Ardan, begins the five-day trip to the Moon. A few minutes into the journey, a small, bright asteroid passes within a few hundred yards of them, but does not collide with the projectile. The asteroid had been captured by the Earth's gravity and had become a second moon.

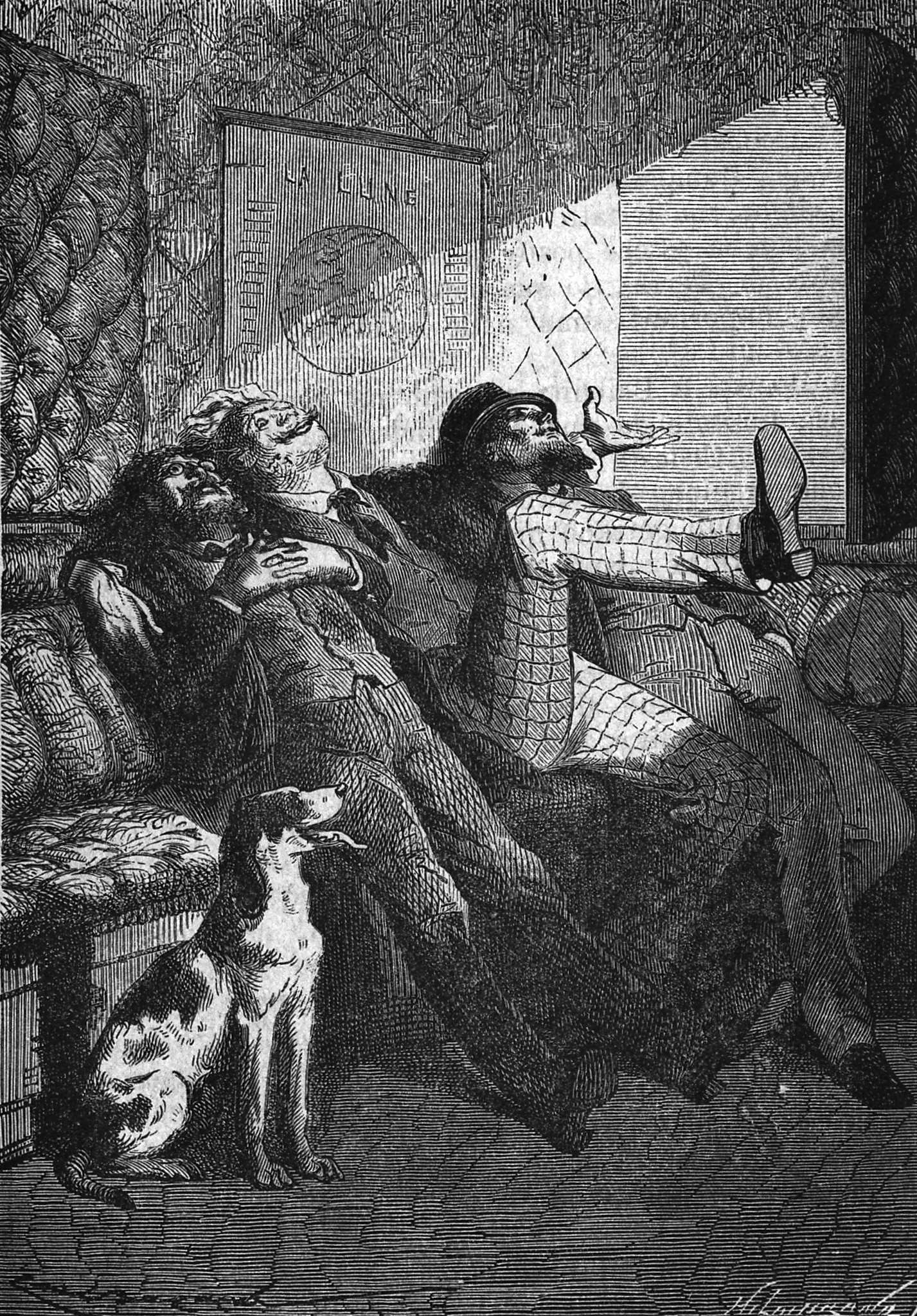
An illustration from Jules Verne's novel Around the Moon drawn by Émile-Antoine Bayard and Alphonse de Neuville, September 16, 1872

The three travelers undergo a series of adventures and misadventures during the rest of the journey, including disposing of the body of a dog out a window, suffering intoxication by gases, and making calculations leading them, briefly, to believe that they are to fall back to Earth. During the latter part of the voyage, it becomes apparent that the gravitational force of their earlier encounter with the asteroid has caused the projectile to deviate from its course.

The projectile enters lunar orbit, rather than landing on the Moon as originally planned. Barbicane, Ardan and Nicholl begin geographical observations with opera glasses. The projectile then dips over the northern hemisphere of the Moon, into the darkness of its shadow. It is plunged into extreme cold, before emerging into the light and heat again. They then begin to approach the Moon's southern hemisphere. From the safety of their projectile, they gain spectacular views of Tycho, one of the greatest of all craters on the Moon. The three men discuss the possibility of life on the Moon, and conclude that it is barren. The projectile begins to move away from the Moon, towards the 'dead point' (the place at which the gravitational attraction of the Moon and Earth becomes equal). Michel Ardan hits upon the idea of using the rockets fixed to the bottom of the projectile (which they were originally going to use to deaden the shock of landing) to propel the projectile towards the Moon and hopefully cause it to fall onto it, thereby achieving their mission.

When the projectile reaches the point of neutral attraction, the rockets are fired, but it is too late. The projectile begins a fall onto the Earth from a distance of 260,000 kilometres (160,000 miles), and it is to strike the Earth at a speed of 185,400 km/h (115,200 mph), the same speed at which it left the mouth of the Columbiad. All hope seems lost for Barbicane, Nicholl and Ardan. Four days later, the crew of a US Navy vessel, Susquehanna, spots a bright meteor fall from the sky into the sea. This turns out to be the returning projectile. A rescue operation is assembled, intending to raise the capsule from a depth of 6096 m (20,000 ft), using diving bells and steam-powered grappling claws. After several days of fruitless searches, all hope is lost and the rescue party heads home. On the way back, a lookout spots a strange shining buoy. Only then do the rescuers realize that the hollow aluminium projectile had positive buoyancy and thus must have surfaced after impact. The 'buoy' turns out to be the projectile and three men inside are found to be alive and well. They are treated to lavish homecoming celebrations as the first people to leave Earth.

== Gallery ==
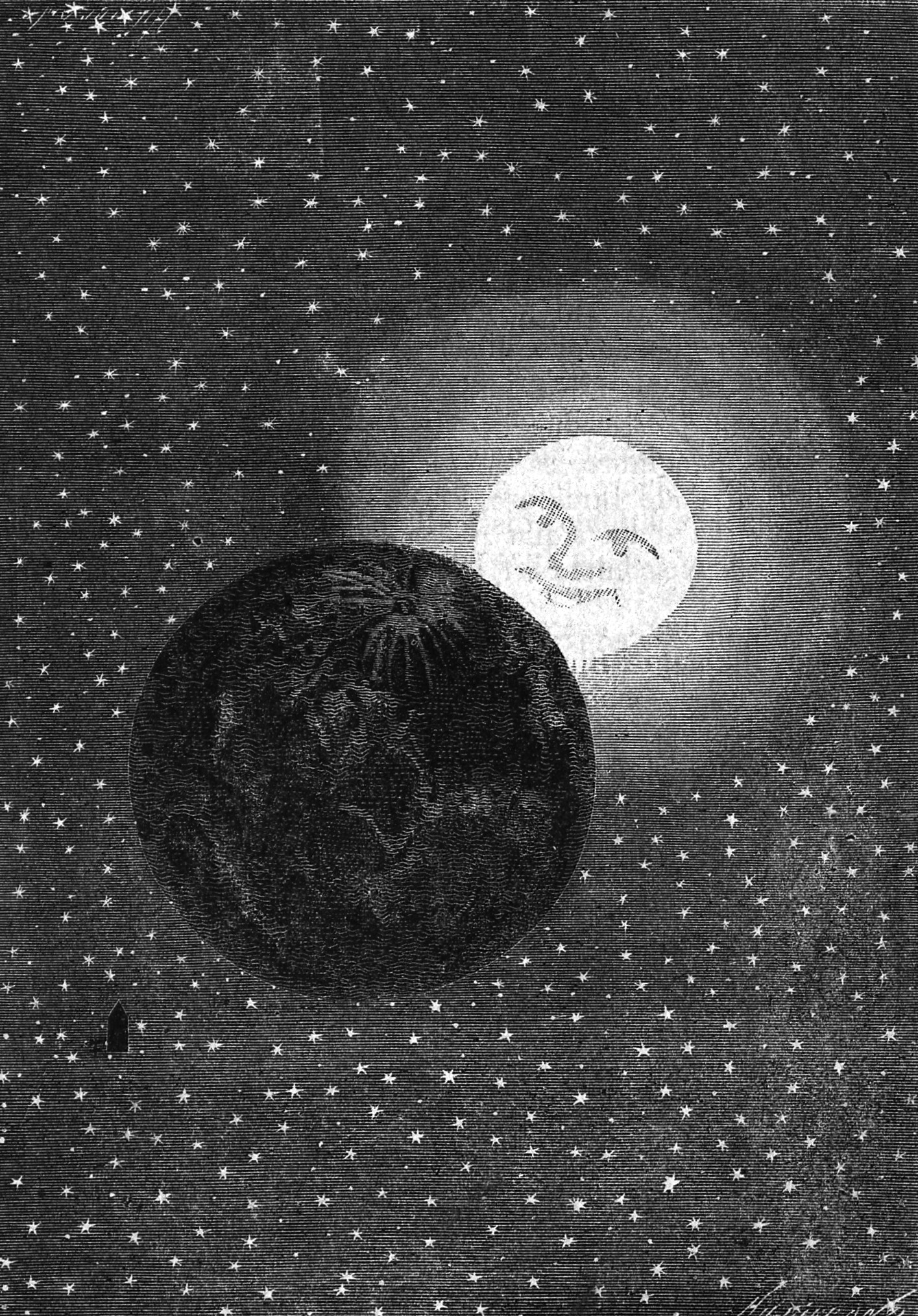

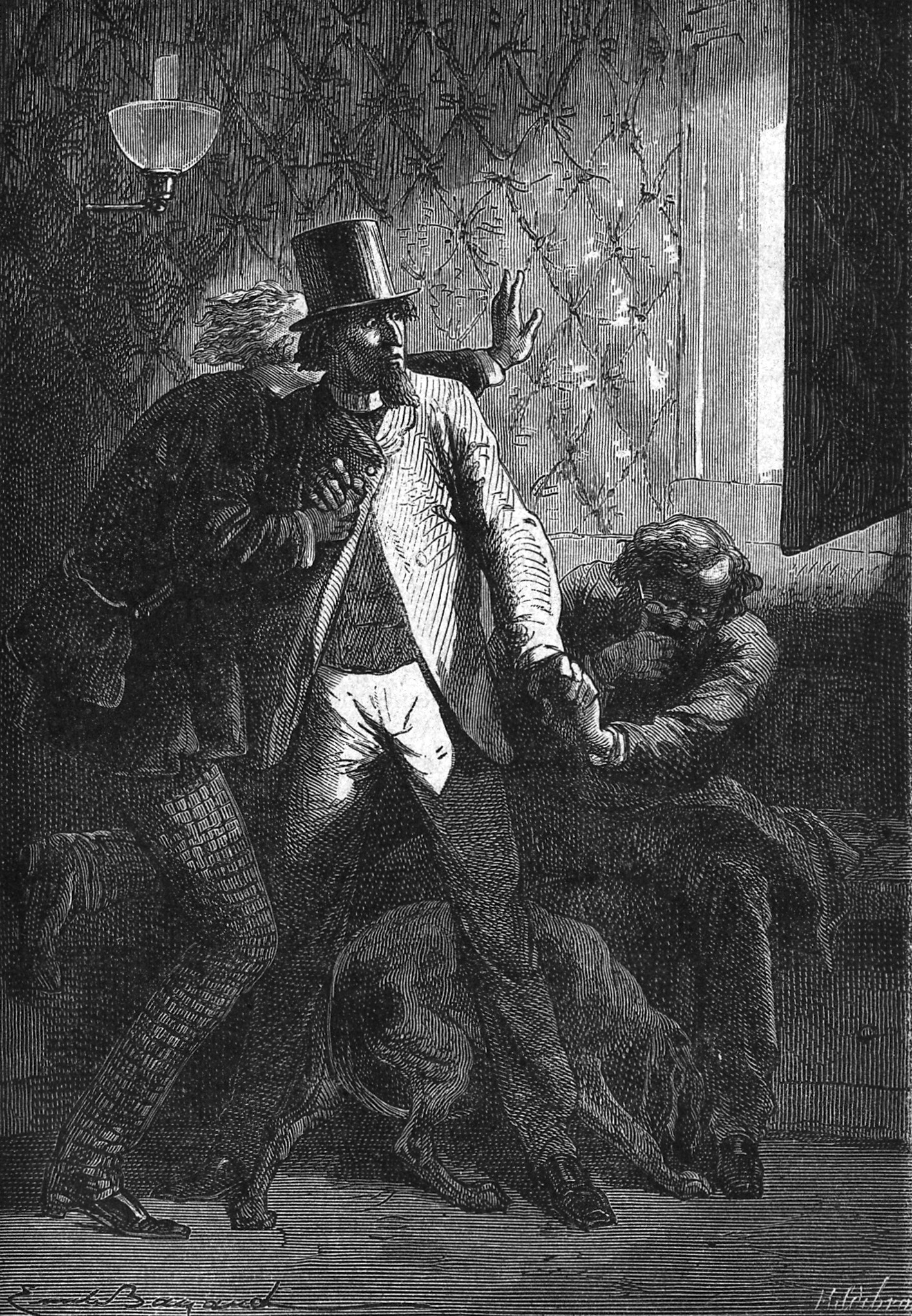

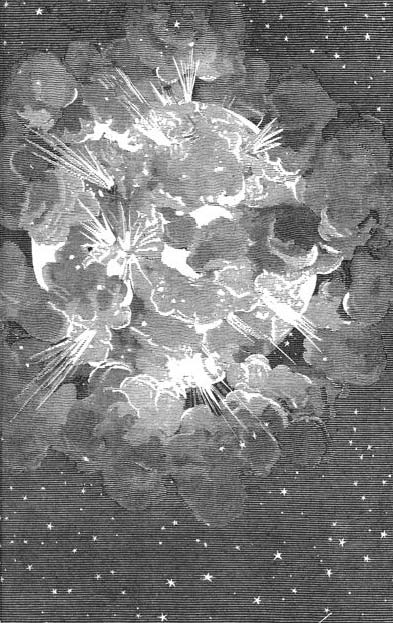

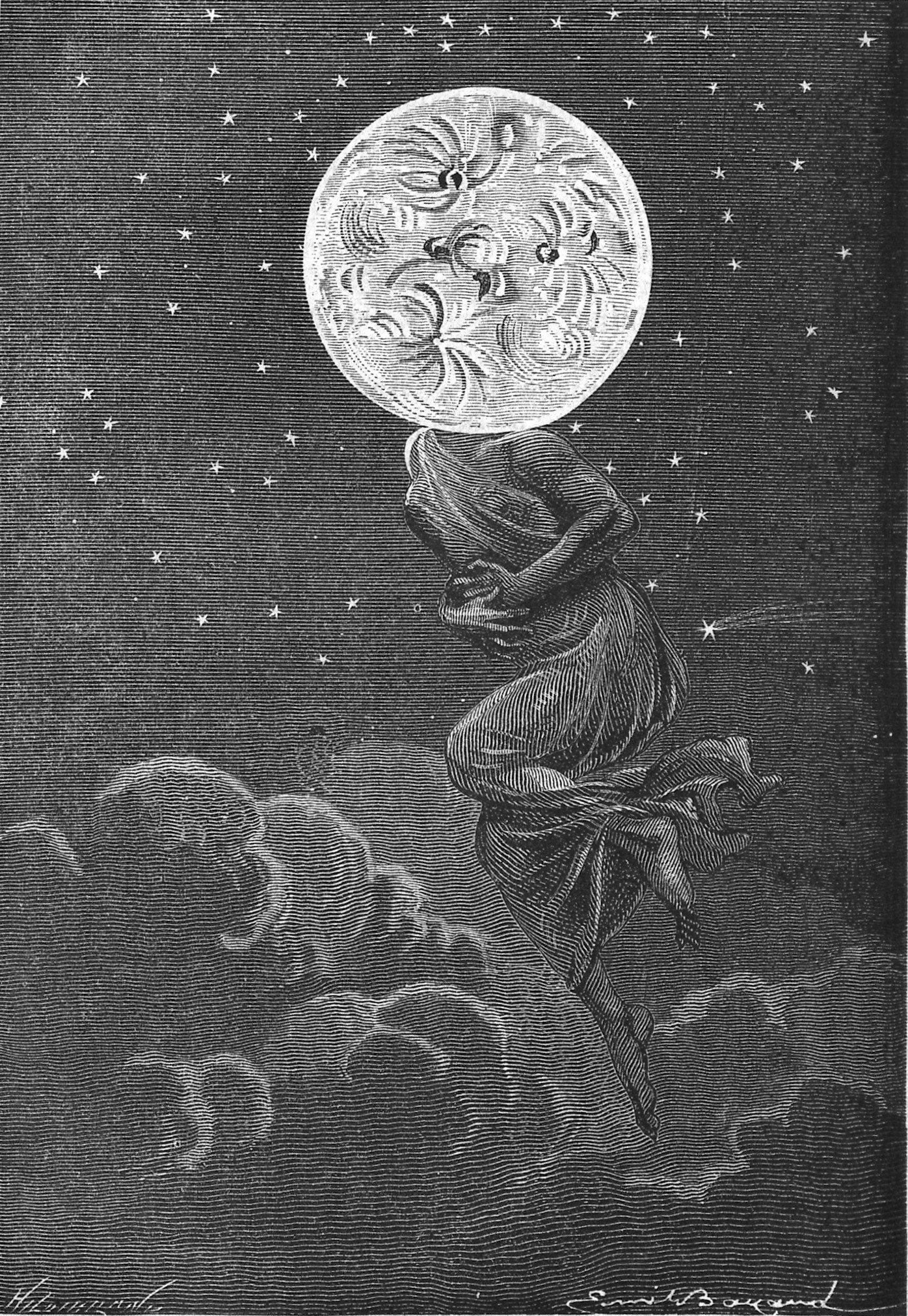

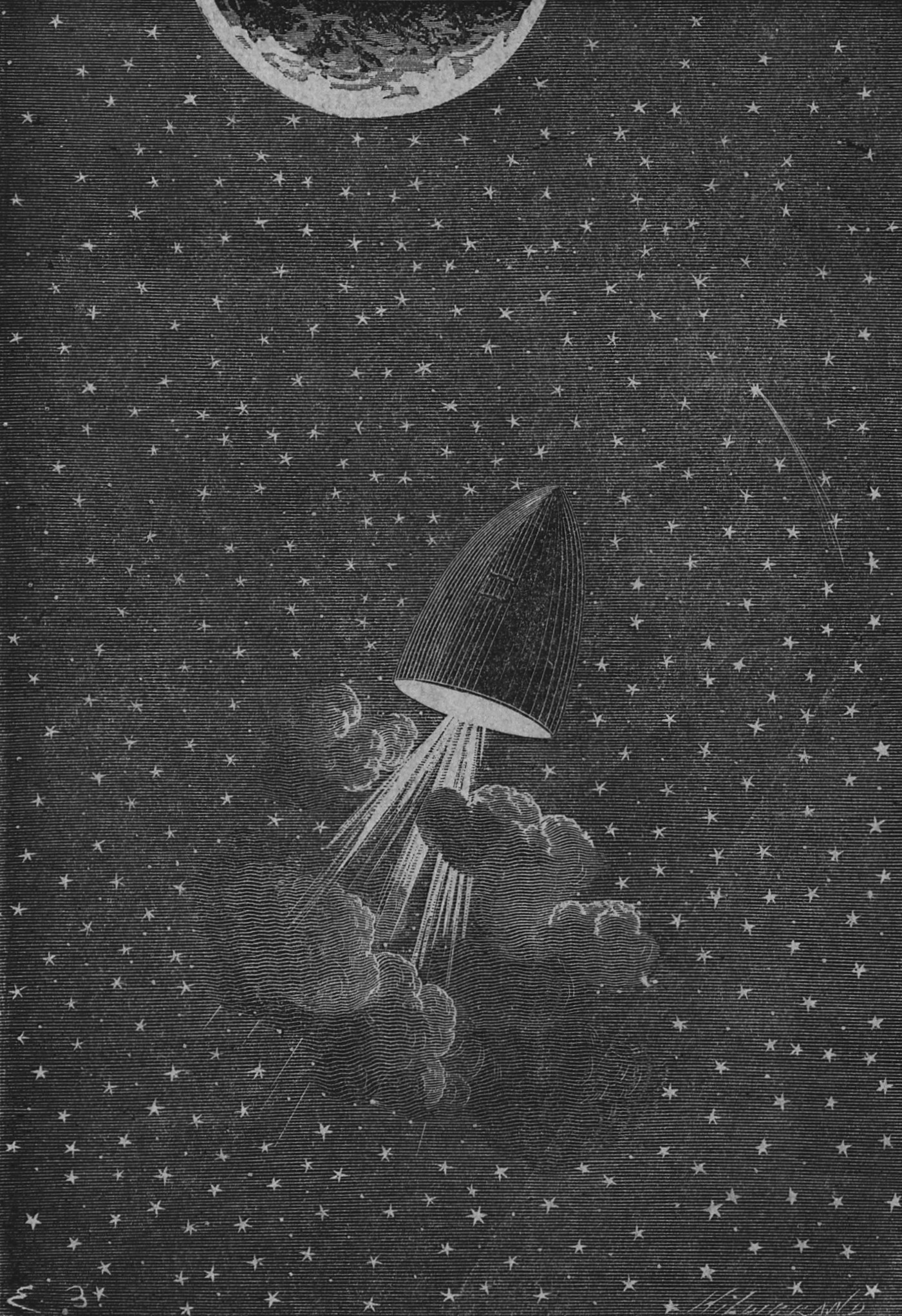

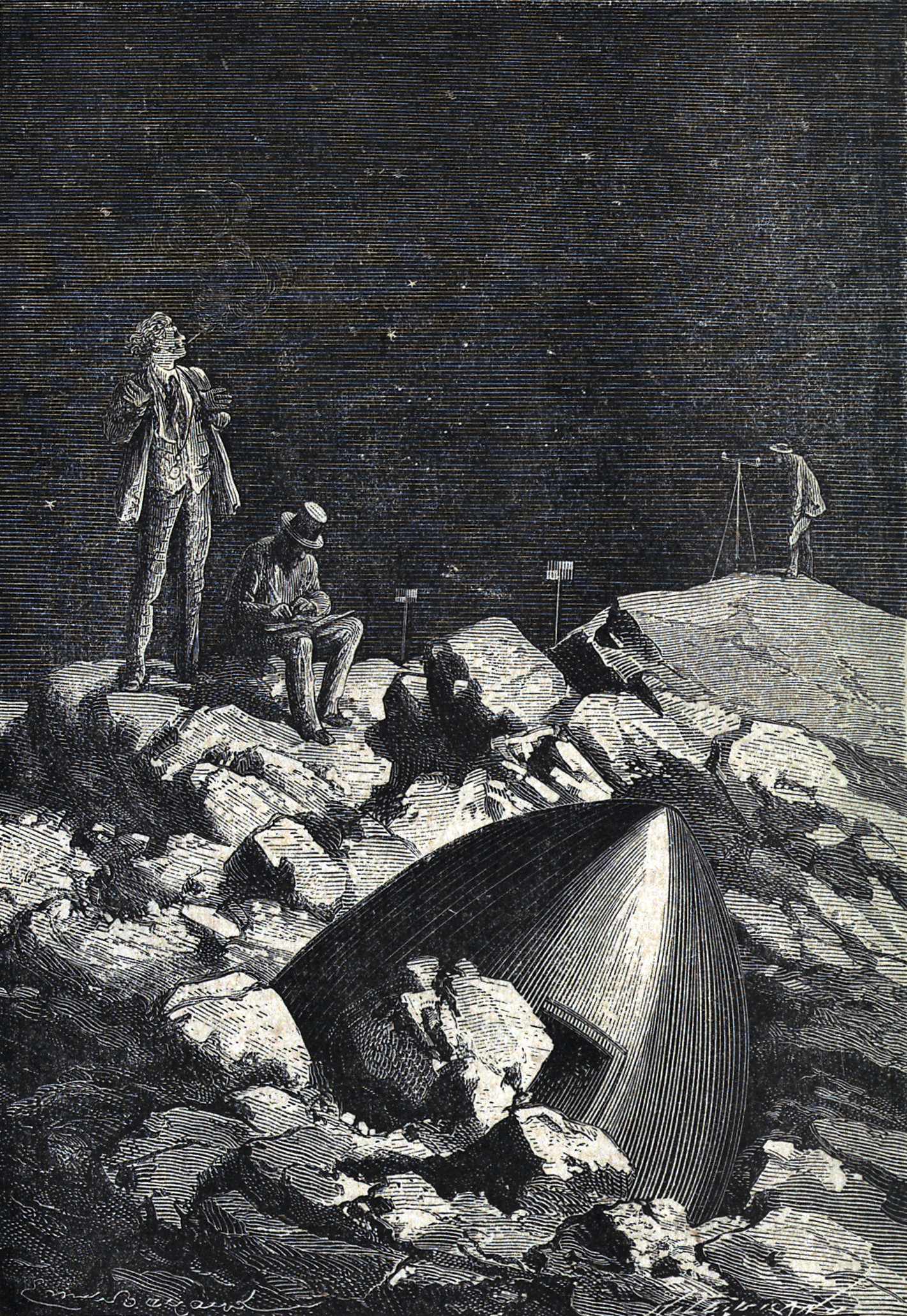

== See also ==
- Moon in fiction
- Autour de la Lune
