= Great Comet of 1823 =

Comet

C/1823 Y1 (De Bréauté–Pons) (Great Comet of 1823)
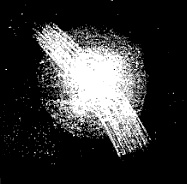
- Coma and twin tails of the Great Comet of 1823.

Discovery
- Discovered by: Nell de Bréauté; Jean-Louis Pons
- Discovery date: 29 December 1823

Orbital characteristics
- Epoch: 15 February 1824 (JD 2387306.5)
- Observation arc: 67 days
- Number of observations: 200
- Perihelion: 0.2267 AU
- Eccentricity: ~1.000
- Inclination: 103.819°
- Longitude of ascending node: 305.505°
- Argument of periapsis: 28.487°
- Last perihelion: 9 December 1823
- Comet total magnitude (M1): 6.5

The Great Comet of 1823, also designated C/1823 Y1 or Comet De Bréauté-Pons, was a bright comet visible from December 1823 to April 1824.

== Discovery and observations ==
It was independently discovered by Nell de Bréauté at Dieppe on December 29, by Jean-Louis Pons on the morning of December 30, and by Wilhelm von Biela at Prague on the same morning. It was already visible to the naked eye when discovered: Pons initially thought he was seeing smoke from a chimney rising over a hill, but continued observing when he noticed it did not change appearance. He was later to note that the comet was, puzzlingly, more easily visible to the naked eye than through a telescope. Biela also noted that it was noticeably brighter than the Great Comet of 1819 had been.

The comet was particularly known at the time for exhibiting two tails, one pointing away from the Sun and the other (termed an "anomalous tail" by Karl Harding and Heinrich Olbers) pointing towards it.

Caroline Herschel recorded an observation of the comet on January 31, 1824, as the last entry in her observing book.

Pons was also the last astronomer to detect the comet, on April 1, 1824.
