= Watt (crater) =

Crater on the Moon

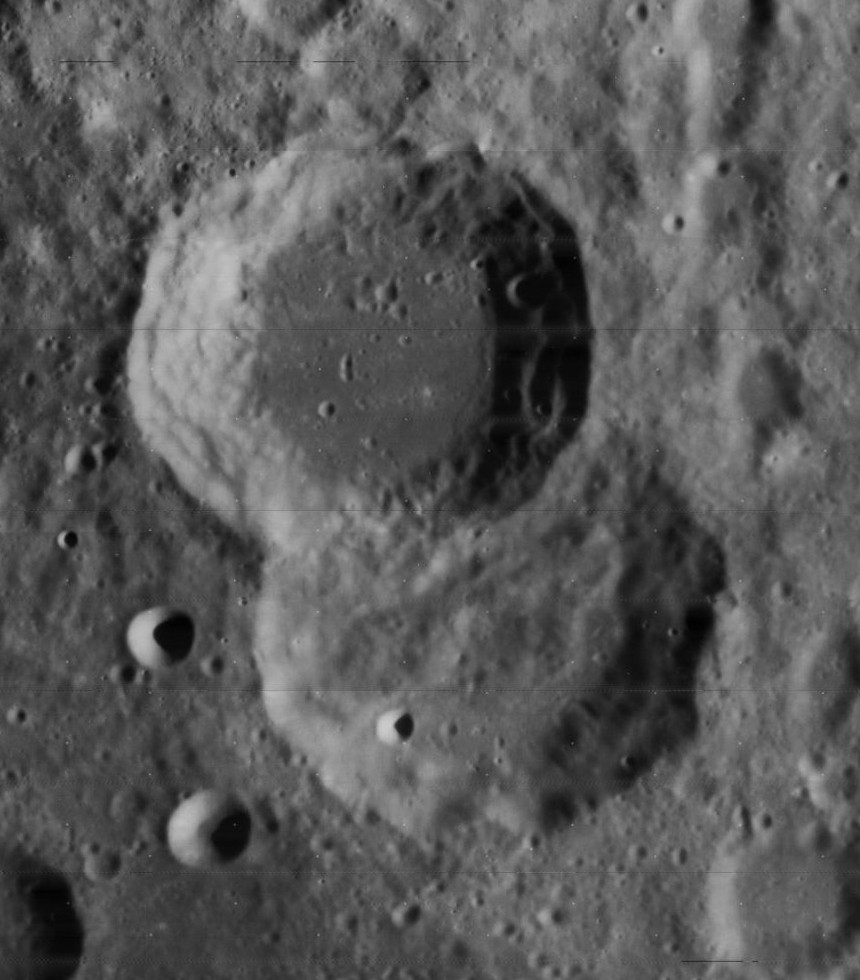
- Lunar Orbiter 4 image, with Steinheil at top and Watt below
- Coordinates: 49.5°S 48.6°E
- Diameter: 66 km
- Depth: Unknown
- Colongitude: 313° at sunrise
- Eponym: James Watt

Watt is a lunar impact crater that is located in the southeastern part of the Moon. It was named after Scottish inventor James Watt. The northwestern third of the crater rim has been completely overlain by the same-sized Steinheil, leaving much of the interior floor covered with the outer rampart of ejecta from the latter formation. The remainder of the rim of Watt is somewhat jagged in appearance, with an inward bulge along the southeast rim and a pair of small outward projections to the northeast. The rim is otherwise relatively sharply defined, with only a minor amount of wear.

Nearby craters of note include Biela to the south-southeast, Rosenberger to the southwest, and the walled plain named Janssen to the northwest past Steinheil.

== Satellite craters ==
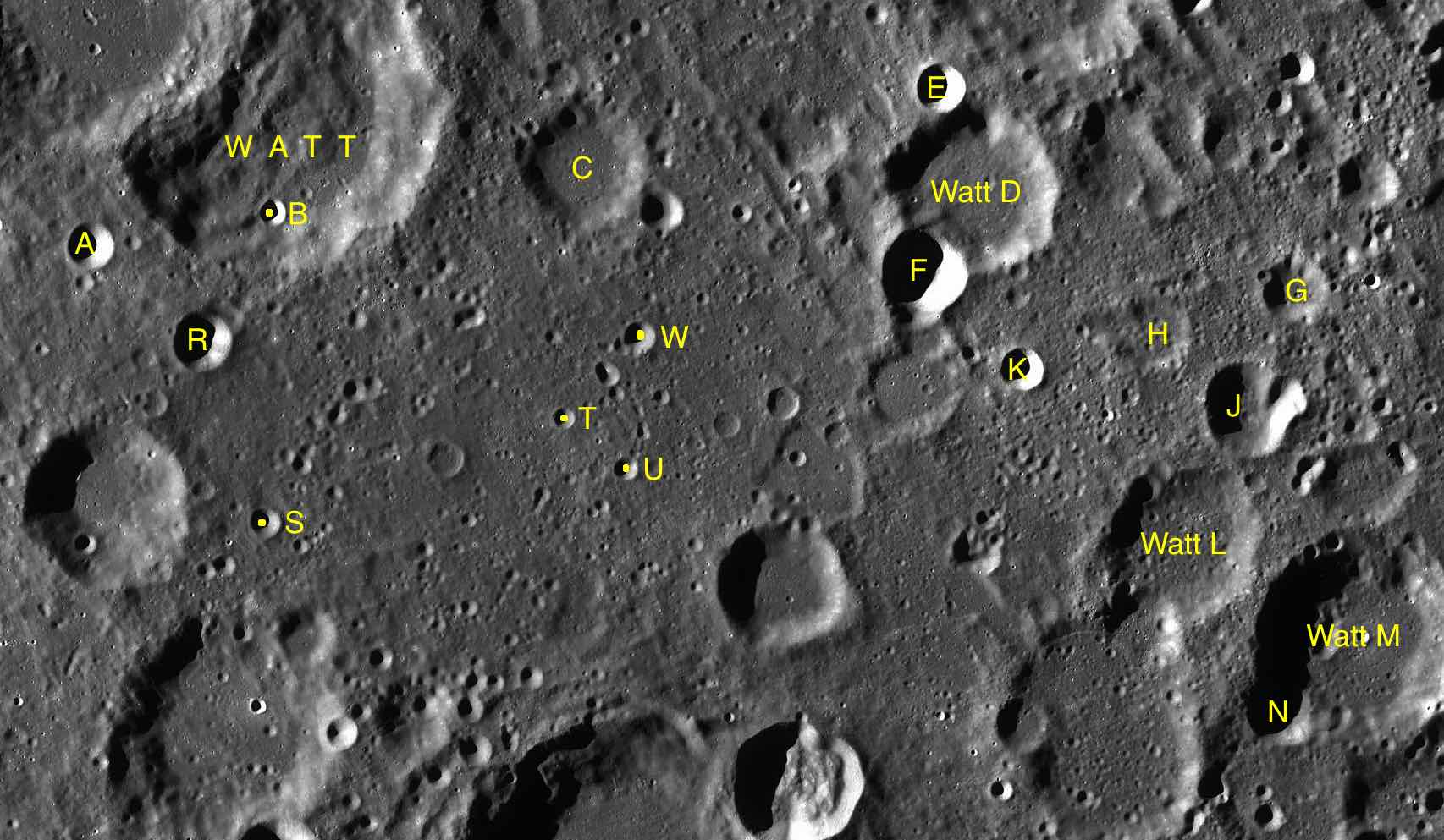
Satellite craters map

By convention these features are identified on lunar maps by placing the letter on the side of the crater midpoint that is closest to Watt.

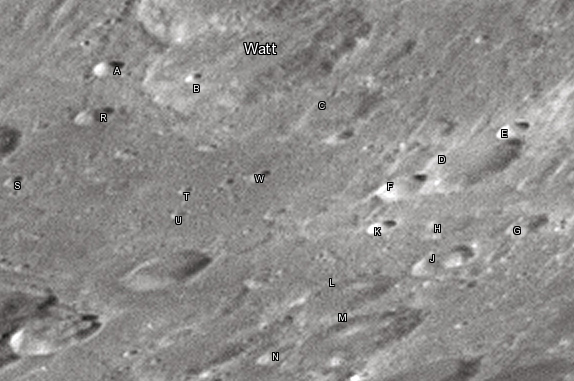
Watt crater and its satellite craters taken from Earth in 2012 at the University of Hertfordshire's Bayfordbury Observatory with the telescopes Meade LX200 14" and Lumenera Skynyx 2-1

Watt	Latitude	Longitude	Diameter
A	50.3° S	46.4° E	10 km
B	50.1° S	48.0° E	6 km
C	50.0° S	51.5° E	24 km
D	50.3° S	55.2° E	32 km
E	49.7° S	55.3° E	10 km
F	50.5° S	54.3° E	16 km
G	50.9° S	58.7° E	13 km
H	51.2° S	57.2° E	16 km
J	51.6° S	58.3° E	18 km
K	51.4° S	55.9° E	8 km
L	52.6° S	57.6° E	32 km
M	53.1° S	59.9° E	42 km
N	53.6° S	58.7° E	11 km
R	51.0° S	47.5° E	12 km
S	52.2° S	47.8° E	6 km
T	51.6° S	51.0° E	4 km
U	52.0° S	51.7° E	5 km
W	51.1° S	51.9° E	7 km
