= Brenner (crater) =

Crater on the Moon

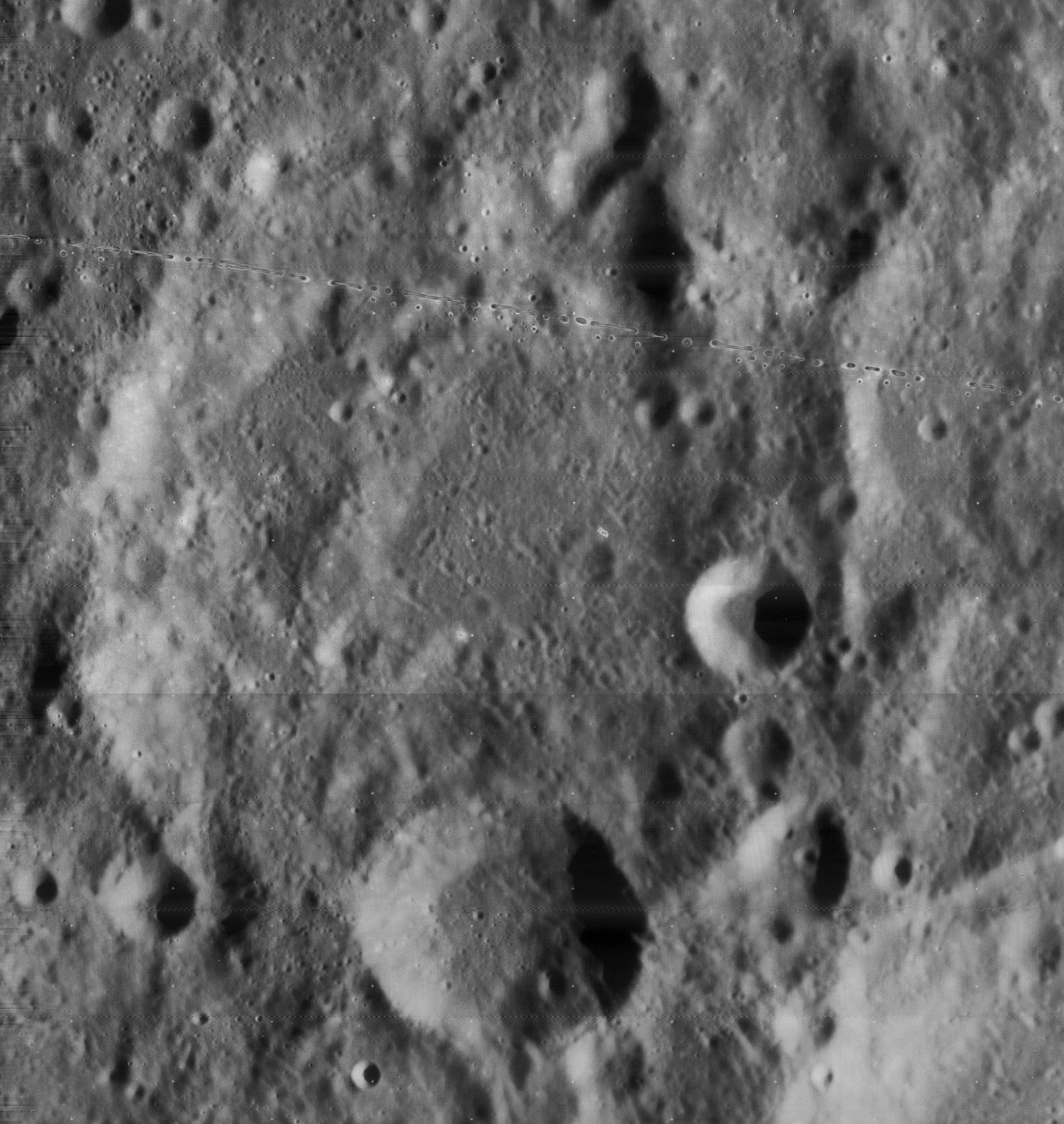
- Lunar Orbiter 4 image
- Coordinates: 39.0°S 39.3°E
- Diameter: 90.01 km (55.93 mi)
- Depth: 3.3 km (2.1 mi)
- Colongitude: 322° at sunrise
- Eponym: Spiridon Gopčević aka Leo Brenner

Brenner is an old lunar impact crater that lies in the rugged southeastern part of the Moon's near side. It is located within one crater diameter northwest of the crater pair Metius and Fabricius.

This ancient formation has been deeply eroded by subsequent impacts, to the point where only the western part still resembles a crater. That face has the most intact part of the rim, although it has been worn down until it forms a low ridge in the surface. The northeast part of the crater has been reshaped until it is little more than a rough, irregular part of the terrain. The southeastern rim is overlain by a relatively old crater designated Brenner A.

This crater is named after Serbian-Austrian astronomer Spiridon Gopčević (1855-1928). He was a publicist writing under the psuedoname Leo Brenner, and was introduced into lunar nomenclature by German educator and astronomer Philipp Fauth. Its designation was formally adopted by the International Astronomical Union in 1935.

== Satellite craters ==
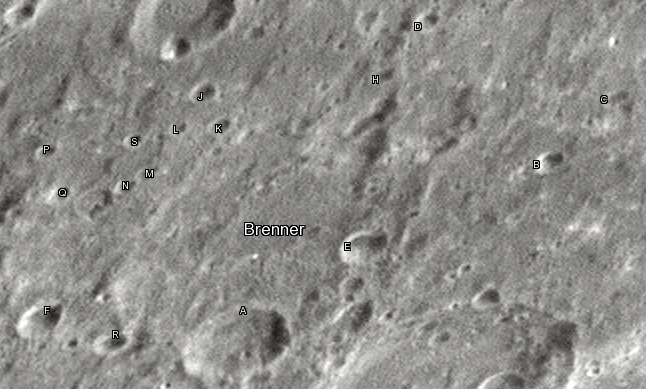
Brenner crater and its satellite craters taken from Earth in 2012 at the University of Hertfordshire's Bayfordbury Observatory with the telescopes Meade LX200 14" and Lumenera Skynyx 2-1

By convention these features are identified on lunar maps by placing the letter on the side of the crater midpoint that is closest to Brenner.

Brenner	Latitude	Longitude	Diameter
A	40.4° S	40.0° E	32 km
B	37.4° S	41.8° E	10 km
C	36.5° S	41.9° E	7 km
D	36.2° S	38.7° E	8 km
E	38.9° S	40.5° E	14 km
F	40.6° S	37.0° E	14 km
H	36.9° S	38.7° E	8 km
J	37.7° S	36.6° E	8 km
K	38.0° S	37.3° E	7 km
L	38.1° S	36.6° E	5 km
M	38.8° S	36.9° E	7 km
N	39.0° S	36.7° E	7 km
P	38.8° S	35.3° E	7 km
Q	39.2° S	35.9° E	8 km
R	40.7° S	38.3° E	10 km
S	38.4° S	36.2° E	6 km
