= Lockyer (lunar crater) =

Crater on the Moon

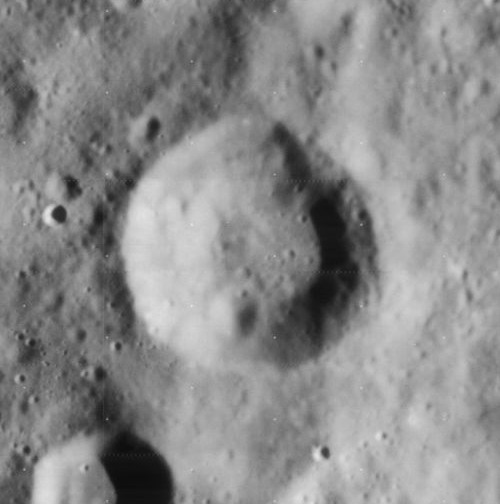
- Lunar Orbiter 4 image
- Coordinates: 46.2°S 36.7°E
- Diameter: 34 km
- Depth: 3.8 km
- Colongitude: 324° at sunrise
- Eponym: Norman Lockyer

Lockyer is a lunar impact crater that is located along the western wall of the large walled plain Janssen. It was named after British astrophysicist Norman Lockyer. This crater is roughly circular with a slight outward bulge along the eastern side. The edge of the rim is only lightly eroded, with an indentation in the side to the north-northwest. The interior floor is relatively featureless, except for a small crater along the edge of the southern inner wall.

== Satellite craters ==
By convention these features are identified on lunar maps by placing the letter on the side of the crater midpoint that is closest to Lockyer.

Lockyer	Latitude	Longitude	Diameter
A	44.0° S	31.0° E	10 km
F	47.5° S	36.5° E	20 km
G	45.7° S	33.3° E	24 km
H	44.5° S	32.5° E	31 km
J	45.0° S	32.3° E	13 km
