= Lewis Page Mercier =

English clergyman and translator

- Born: 9 January 1820
- Died: 2 November 1875 (aged 55)
- Education: BA (Oxon) 1841, M.A. 1855
- Occupations: Chaplain of the Foundling Hospital, 1861-73
- Known for: Translator of Jules Verne's novels
- Spouse: Anna Marie Hovell
- Children: 11

Reverend Lewis Page Mercier (9 January 1820 – 2 November 1875) was a British priest and translator. He is known today as the translator, along with Eleanor Elizabeth King, of three of the best-known novels of Jules Verne: Twenty Thousand Leagues Under the Seas, From the Earth to the Moon, and Around the Moon. To avoid a conflict of interest with his position as chaplain, Mercier wrote under the pen names of Louis Mercier, MA (Oxon) and Mercier Lewis.

== Chronology ==
Born on 9 January 1820 (christened 7 February 1820, Old Church, Saint Pancras, London,) the only son of Francis Michael Jacob Mercier, Lewis Page Mercier came of French Huguenot stock; his grandfather was pastor of the French Protestant church in Threadneedle Street, London. As a child he almost certainly spoke a species of French at home, a possible qualification for his later translations of Verne. The family was located in the London Borough of Hackney, home of the original silk industry of French mercers (French: mercier).

In 1837 Mercier entered Trinity College, Oxford, where he was the College Latin Essayist. In 1839 he received an open scholarship from the university. He received a Third in "Greats" (Greek and Latin) receiving his B.A. on 25 June 1841, and obtained a post-graduate bursary at University College, Oxford, the "Browne Exhibition", established by one Browne in 1587. Forgoing an academic but at the time necessarily celibate career, he gave up his exhibition to marry Anna Marie Hovell in 1842. He became a deacon in 1843 and a presbyter in 1845. In 1855 he was awarded his M.A. degree from University College.

His first posting was to Glasgow where he was Assistant Minister of St. Andrew's Episcopal Chapel, 2nd master of the Glasgow College School, and Chaplain to the Garrison. While in Glasgow he was admitted to membership in the Glasgow Philosophical Society (15 November 1843). From Glasgow he moved on to be 2nd Master at a new school in Edgbaston, near Birmingham (1846). and headmaster (1849). In 1857 he moved back to Hackney, becoming headmaster at the St. John's Foundation School and Assistant Reader at the Chapel of the Foundling Hospital in nearby Brunswick Square. In 1861 we find him living at the school at age 41, head of a family of 9 children (ages 1,2, 4, 5, 7, 8, 10, 14, 15), numerous servants and 25 pupils. Relieved of his position by the Governing Board in 1861, he then became Chaplain at the Chapel of the Foundling Hospital, then one of the most important charitable institutions in England.

The Foundling Hospital was the first public charity in England, established in 1739 by a Royal Charter granted by King George II and Queen Caroline. The buildings were erected on 53 acres (210,000 m^{2}) purchased by Thomas Coram, the ship captain who sponsored its establishment. Early benefactors were the painter William Hogarth and the composer George Friedrich Handel, who played at the opening and conducted his Messiah every year thereafter. Well-known artists contributed paintings, and the Foundling Hospital became the first picture gallery in the country. Church services at the chapel with famous preachers, famous musicians, a professional choir and organist attracted large crowds of the most well-connected people in London throughout the century. Charles Dickens who lived nearby attended regularly with a reserved pew. The buildings were torn down in 1926 to make way for a fish market, which was never built.

In 1865 Lewis Mercier suddenly found it necessary to borrow £250 secured by a bond from Lord Leigh of Stoneleigh (Warwickshire), the wealthiest landowner in England, at the rate of 12% per annum. (Lord Leigh had appointed him Provincial Grand Chaplain to the Freemasons, Warwickshire in 1852.) By 1870, in ill health and unable to repay his debt when it came due, he was forced to seek extra funds by offering to perform translating tasks for the publishers Sampson Low, Marston, Searle, and Rivington, who were in the process of printing a religious book of his.

In 1871, Sampson Low acquired the English rights to several of Jules Verne's books. For this project the firm assigned the translating duties to Mercier and chose Twenty Thousand Leagues under the Seas as the first volume to appear, which it did in November 1872.

As a translator of Verne's newly popular fiction, Mercier offered one advantage to Sampson Low: speed. A linguist of sorts, conversant with older French dialects, possibly fluent in multiple languages, he worked in his spare time with his assistant Eleanor Elizabeth King (1838 — ??) to translate three Verne novels in little over a year, enabling Sampson Low to come out with new Verne books for the Christmas trade in 1872 and 1873. Mercier's shaky grasp of contemporary French idioms and limited knowledge of his era's science and technology led him into many foolish translating errors. He has also been criticized by British and American scholars for his stilted prose and for the many cuts and omitted details that blemish his translations. In view of his desperate financial situation it has been conjectured that the deletions could have been dictated by his editors at Sampson Low; however no hard evidence has been found to support this surmise. It is equally likely that he worked fast simply to get paid fast.

Mercier was forced to resign his position at the Foundling Hospital by the Governing Board in early 1873 after troubles arose over his supervision of the schools, and he died on Tuesday, 2 November 1875, the date his semi-annual payment of £15 to Lord Leigh was due.

His widow, Anna Margaret, died in Oxford on 5 February 1903, aged 84.

== Affair of Stephan Poles and the British Museum ==
In 1874 the Polish expatriate, revolutionary, member of the Paris Commune, American war correspondent, and author Stephan Poles (1847–1875) published a pamphlet denouncing in strong language the secretary and chief librarian of the British Museum, John Winter Jones. The pamphlet entitled The actual condition of the British Museum, a literary expostulation was sold on Russell Street in front of the building by a sandwich man. Some of the Museum officials furnished information for the compilation of the pamphlet. Mercier apparently read this pamphlet and published his rebuttal The British Museum. An impartial statement, in answer to a pamphlet by Stephan Poles under the pseudonym "M.A." (i.e. Master of Arts). Both of these pamphlets are available in British depositary libraries. Stefan Poles died on 22 November 1875 only a few weeks after the death of Mercier.

== Other works ==
Mercier also translated The Wreck of the Hansa (The German Arctic expedition of 1869–70), as well as publishing several religious works and instructional materials for teachers of Greek and Latin listed below:

- A Manual of Greek Prosody. Mercier, Lewis Page, 12 vo, Glasgow, 1843.
- Selections from Æsop, Xenophon, and Anacreon, for the use of junior forms in schools. Mercier, Lewis Page, 12 vo, London, 1851.
- The Present European Crisis viewed in its relation to Prophecy; a sermon [on Rev. xxii. 10], etc. Mercier, Lewis Page, 8 vo, London, 1853.
- The Principles of Christian Charity derived from the example of our Saviour and His Apostles. Mercier, Lewis Page, 8 vo, London, 1855.
- Considerations respecting a future state, an essay. Mercier, Lewis Page, 8 vo, London, Oxford, 1858
- "The Christian and the Harvest." A sermon [on Matt. iv. 4], etc.; Mercier, Lewis Page, 8 vo, London, 1860.
- "The Mystery of God's Providence." A sermon [on Eccl. vii. 15] preached ... Dec. 22, 1861, on the occasion of the death of H. R. H. the Prince Consort. Mercier, Lewis Page; Albert, Prince Consort of Victoria, Queen of Great Britain and Ireland, London, [1861.]
- "The Eucharistic Feast." A brief historical inquiry into the true nature of the Lord's Supper. Mercier, Lewis Page, 8 vo, London, 1868.
- Outlines of the life of the Lord Jesus Christ : with critical and expository notes, and an emendation of the common chronologies. Rev. Lewis Mercier, London: Sampson Low, Marston, Low & Searle, 1871, 1872.
- The German Arctic Expedition of 1869-70, and narrative of the wreck of the "Hansa" in the ice. By Captain Koldewey ... assisted by members of the scientific staff. With ... illustrations. Translated and abridged by the Rev. L. Mercier; and edited by H. W. Bates., London : Sampson Low, Marston, Low & Searle, 1874.
- The British Museum. An impartial statement, in answer to a pamphlet by Stephan Poles entitled "The Actual Condition of the British Museum", By M. A. [i.e. L. P. Mercier.] / A., M.; Mercier, Lewis Page; Poles, Stephan; London: Spottiswoode & Co., 1875.
