= Wilhelm von Biela =

German-Austrian military officer and amateur astronomer

Baron Wilhelm von Biela
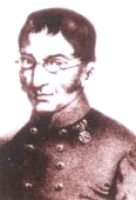
- Born: March 19, 1782
- Died: February 18, 1856 (aged 73)
- Known for: Biela's Comet

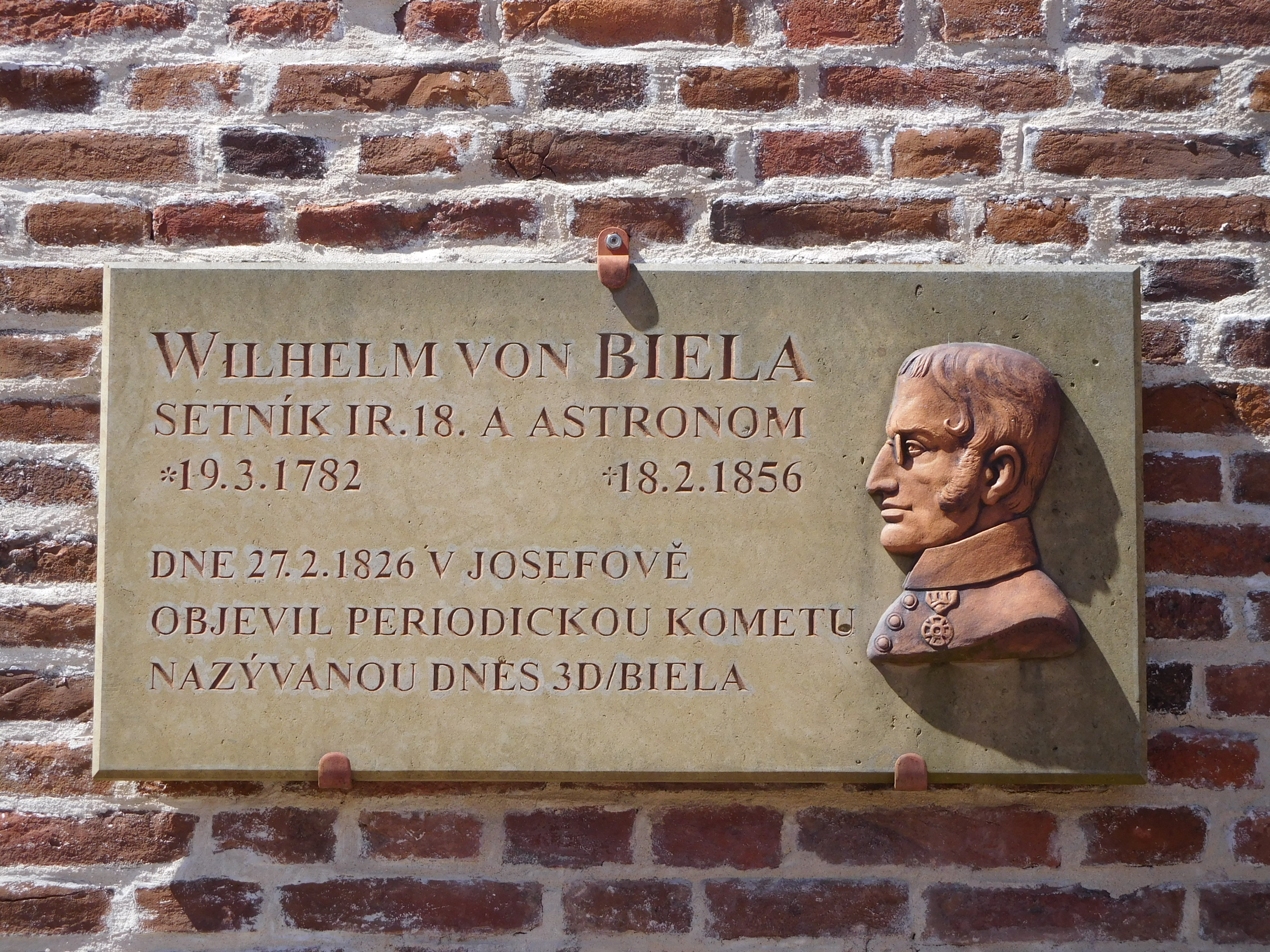
Memorial plaque in Josefov

Baron Wilhelm von Biela (German: Wilhelm Freiherr von Biela; March 19, 1782 – February 18, 1856) was a German-Austrian military officer and amateur astronomer.

Wilhelm von Biela was born in Roßla, Harz (Northern Germany). He was a descendant of a prominent Protestant noble family originally from what is now the Czech Republic, the family having been exiled to Saxony after its head, Friedrich von Biela, was executed in Prague in 1621 during the religious wars of the period. Biela was the last member of his branch of the family.

After study at military college in Dresden, Biela joined the Austrian army in 1802, serving as a cadet in the Infantry Regiment 'Graf Stuart' Nr. 18. He rose to the rank of a captain of Grenadiers and participated in a number of military campaigns against Napoleon between 1805, 1809 and later on. In 1813 he was an Adjutant to General Merveldt at the Battle of Leipzig, where he was wounded.

In 1815 Biela went to Prague, where he commenced study of astronomy under Martin Alois David. He later served in Italy and was appointed the commandant of the town of Rovigo.

In the field of astronomy, he specialized in observing and calculating the orbits of comets. He also did some sunspot observations and published a series of articles, mostly in the Astronomische Nachrichten, on subjects such as comets, the theoretical considerations of comets "falling into the Sun", Tycho Brahe, and occultations of stars by the Moon. He also published a longer work on planetary rotation, Die zweite grosse Weltenkraft, nebst Ideen über einige Geheimnisse der physischen Astronomie, oder Andeutungen zu einer Theorie der Tangentialkraft (Prague, 1836). In its preface he stated that although the work was the fruit of many years of study, it could be read through in half an hour.

Biela independently discovered two comets that others had already found (notably the Great Comet of 1823, C/1823 Y1) and made one independent discovery of his own: the periodic Biela's Comet, which subsequently split in two and disintegrated. The lunar crater Biela is named after him.

Relatively little seems to be recorded of Biela's personal life: he was married to Anna (Edle von Wallenstern) and they had a daughter Emilie Freiin von Biela, born in 1820 and married in Rovigo to Moritz, Graf Forgách, another Austrian infantry officer, by whom she had two children.

In the 1840s Biela retired to Venice, where he died in 1856.

The minor planet 2281 Biela is named in his honor.
