= Metius (crater) =

Crater on the Moon

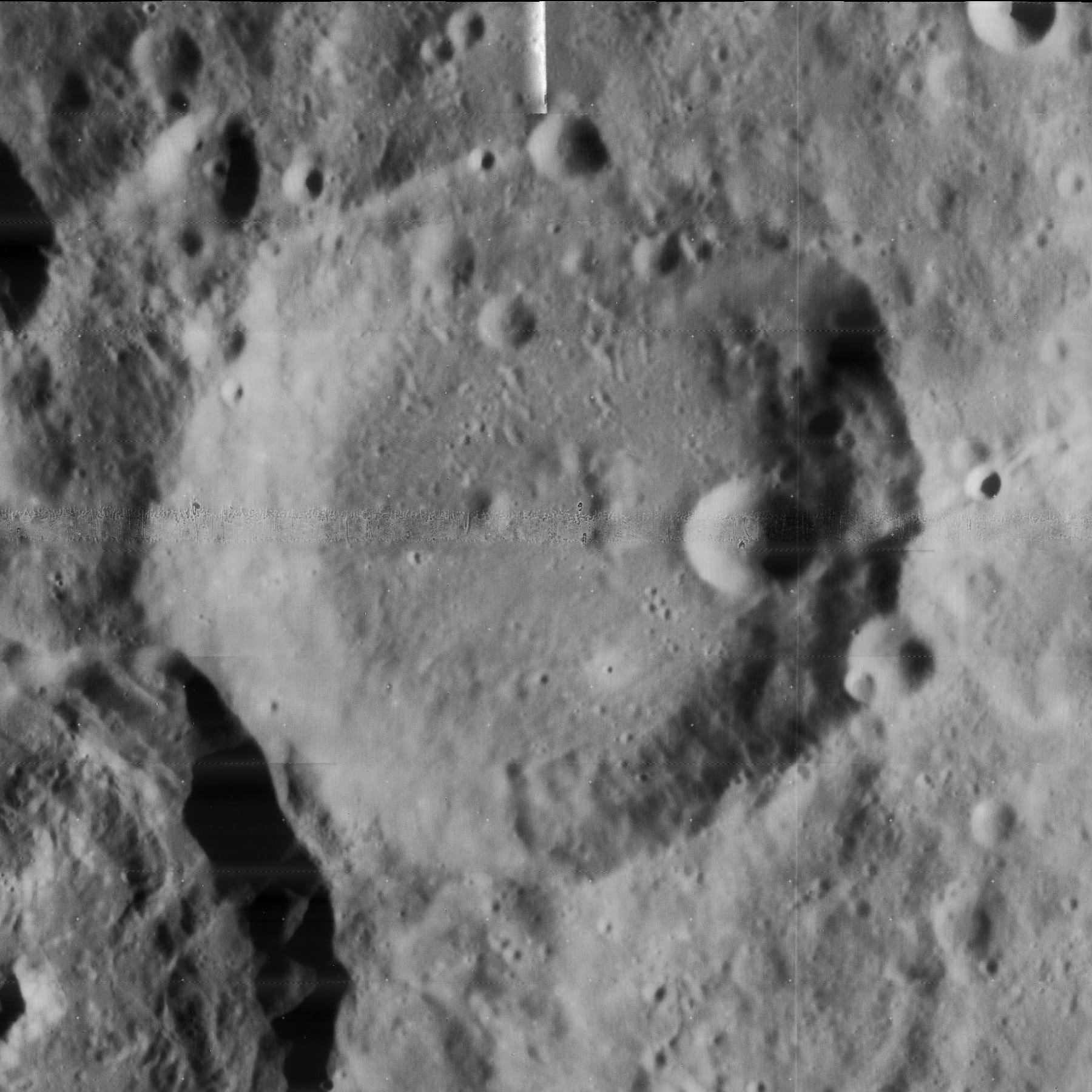
- Lunar Orbiter 4 image
- Coordinates: 40.3°S 43.3°E
- Diameter: 88 km
- Depth: 3.0 km
- Colongitude: 317° at sunrise
- Formation: Nectarian
- Eponym: Adriaan Metius

Metius is a lunar impact crater located in the rugged highlands to the southeast of the Moon's near side. To the southwest the rim is attached to the crater Fabricius. Offset to the west-northwest is the heavily worn crater Brenner. Further away to the northeast is the crater Rheita and the long gorge Vallis Rheita.

On the lunar geologic timescale, Metius is a crater of Nectarian age. The rim of Metius does not protrude prominently into the surroundings and has an insignificant rampart. A few small craters mar the outer wall, but generally it has a smoothed down appearance that is almost free of terraces. The floor is relatively flat with low central peaks. The most prominent crater on the floor is Metius B, located near the northeast rim.

The eponym for this crater is the Dutch geometer and astronomer Adriaan Adriaanszoon, who went by the name of Metius.

== Satellite craters ==
By convention these features are identified on lunar maps by placing the letter on the side of the crater midpoint that is closest to Metius.

Metius	Latitude	Longitude	Diameter
B	40.1° S	44.3° E	14 km
C	44.2° S	49.1° E	11 km
D	42.6° S	48.4° E	11 km
E	39.7° S	42.8° E	6 km
F	39.1° S	42.9° E	8 km
G	40.3° S	45.3° E	9 km
