= Harold Salemson =

American correspondent

- Born: 30 September 1910; Chicago
- Died: 25 August 1988; Glen Cove Hospital

Harold J. Salemson (September 30, 1910 – August 25, 1988) was a correspondent for newspapers, a film and book critic, as well as a publisher, editor, and translator. He served in the U.S. Army during World War II. He was put on the Hollywood blacklist for alleged past involvement with the Communist Party and Communism.

== Early life ==
Salemson was born in Chicago, Illinois, and attended the University of Montpellier and the Sorbonne, having moved to France with his parents in 1922. In the fall of 1927, he studied for one semester at the Experimental College of the University of Wisconsin–Madison. He returned to France in 1928, where he worked as a newspaper correspondent and ran a small news syndicate. He was also a film critic for Henri Barbusse's weekly Monde.

In 1928 he published an article in Poetry: A Magazine of Verse. He was the founder and editor of the bilingual literary quarterly Tambour, which he published in Paris from 1928 until 1930.

From 1932 until the U.S. entered World War II, he worked as the Hollywood correspondent for several French publications. He enlisted in the U.S. Army immediately following the Japanese attack on Pearl Harbor and served in the Army's Psychological Warfare Branch in North Africa and Italy, producing propaganda leaflets and radio broadcasts delivered to occupied Europe.

In 1947, he edited the book Thought Control in U.S.A, which was published by Progressive Citizens of America. He appeared before the House Un-American Activities Committee in August 1955, accompanied by his lawyer Victor Rabinowitz, but refused to denounce anyone and was fired from his job with Italian Film Export the following day. As a result, he became a self-employed translator of books from French to English. Among his 24 book translations were biographies of Pablo Picasso, Salvador Dalí, and Georges Simenon.

== Later life ==
In 1966, Salemson became a book reviewer for Newsday and later taught film history courses at Long Island University's Brooklyn campus.

Salemson died of a heart attack at Community Hospital in Glen Cove, New York, on August 25, 1988.
