= Steinheil (crater) =

Crater on the Moon

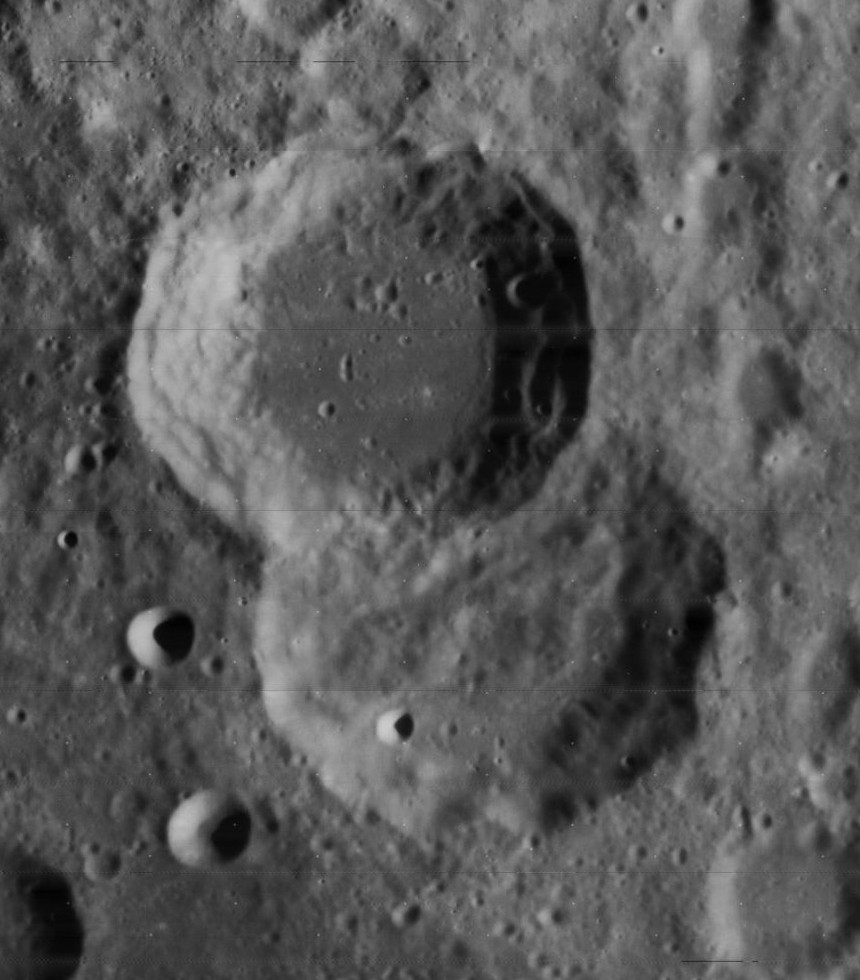
- Lunar Orbiter 4 image, with Steinheil at top and Watt below
- Coordinates: 48.71°S 46.66°E
- Diameter: 63.28 km
- Depth: 3.0 km
- Colongitude: 315° at sunrise
- Formation: Nectarian
- Eponym: Carl August von Steinheil

Steinheil is a lunar impact crater that is located in the rugged highlands in the southeastern part of the Moon. It was named after German astronomer and physicist Carl August von Steinheil in 1935. It forms a prominent crater pair with the similar-sized Watt, which it partly overlies to the southeast. To the northwest is the large walled plain Janssen. Due to the location of this crater, it appears foreshortened when viewed from the Earth. It is from the Nectarian period, 3.92 to 3.85 billion years ago.

This is a relatively circular crater that has undergone some light erosion from subsequent impacts. The inner wall is wider along the southwestern rim than elsewhere, and there is a slight outward bulge in the western rim. There are a few tiny craters along the rim and inner wall, the most notable being a crater at the base of the inner northeast rim. The interior floor is level, with no central peak and only a few minor craters.

== Satellite craters ==
By convention these features are identified on lunar maps by placing the letter on the side of the crater midpoint that is closest to Steinheil.

Steinheil	Latitude	Longitude	Diameter
E	44.9° S	47.6° E	16 km
F	45.3° S	48.4° E	21 km
G	45.6° S	49.9° E	19 km
H	45.7° S	46.9° E	20 km
K	48.6° S	51.9° E	5 km
X	47.6° S	45.8° E	17 km
Y	47.3° S	45.1° E	16 km
Z	46.4° S	45.4° E	23 km
