= Jean-Baptiste Pitois =

Jean-Baptiste Pitois, also known as Jean-Baptiste or by the pen name Paul Christian (1811–1877), was a French author, known for The History and Practice of Magic, first published in France in 1870. He was also a journalist and a bibliographer in the Ministry of Public Education.

== Early life ==
Jean-Baptiste Pitois was born May 15, 1811, in Remiremont, France. His family wanted him to become a priest and allowed him to be raised in a monastic community. However, he eventually decided against the priesthood. As a young man, he moved to Paris, where he became the associate of Charles Nodier, one of the leading literary lights of the Romantic movement, which was then emerging on the continent. Nodier's interest in the occult transferred to Pitois.

== Career ==
Pitois became a journalist and wrote largely under the pen name Paul Christian. He co-wrote Historic Paris: Walks in the Streets of Paris (1837–1840), which was his first book, with Nodier. It was followed by his Studies of the Paris Revolution (1839). That same year he was appointed librarian of the Ministry of Public Education.

Working with Nodier through the mass of uncatalogued material opened up a new level of interest in the occult, although it did not manifest for years. Meanwhile, he took his turn in the French army in Algiers from 1843–44 and wrote several historical texts. His most important were the History of the Terrors (1853) and the multi-volume Heroes of Christianity (1853–1857). A hint of what was to come appeared in 1844 with his Stories of the Marvelous from All Times and Lands.

Pitois had read about occultism and developed a strong anticlerical stance. During his life, many Eastern texts had been translated into French, as had the works of Emanuel Swedenborg. In 1859, Pitois turned his attention to esotericism, writing L'Homme rouge des Tuileries (1863) (trs: The Red Man of the Tuileries), a treatise based on a mix of Tarot and Astrology, followed by Historie de la Magie, du monde Surnaturel et de la fatalité à travers les Temps et les Peuples (1870) (trs: History of Magic, the Supernatural World and Fate, through Times and Peoples). Carefully written so as not to offend his largely Catholic audience, it immediately became popular public reading. It surveyed the whole of the occult, explaining each element, and provided a history of occult practice in the West from ancient times.

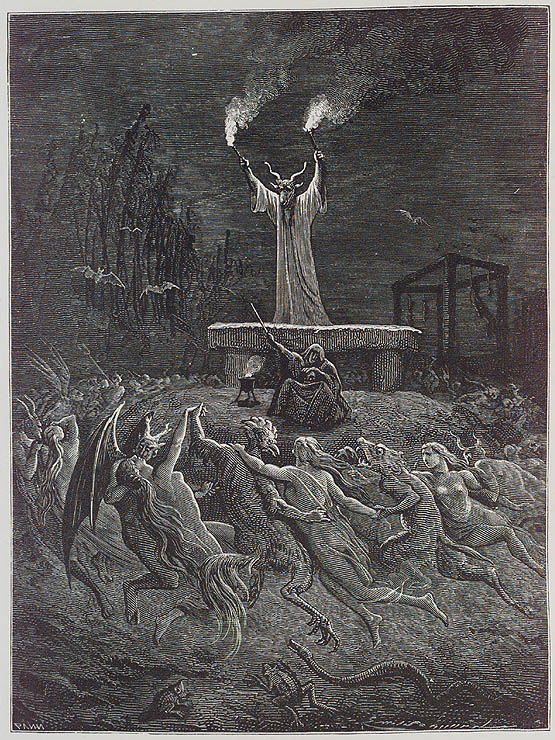
La Danse du Sabbat ("Dance of the Witches Sabbath") by Emile Bayard: illustration from Pitois's Histoire de la Magie

== Death ==
Pitois wrote one additional book, The History of the War with Prussia and of the Two Sieges of Paris, 1870–71 (1872–73). His health declined through the 1870s, and he died at Lyon on July 12, 1877. He left behind a still-unpublished work on astrology that reportedly contains numerous allusions to contemporary events as proof of the value of the horoscope.
