= Fabricius (crater) =

Crater on the Moon

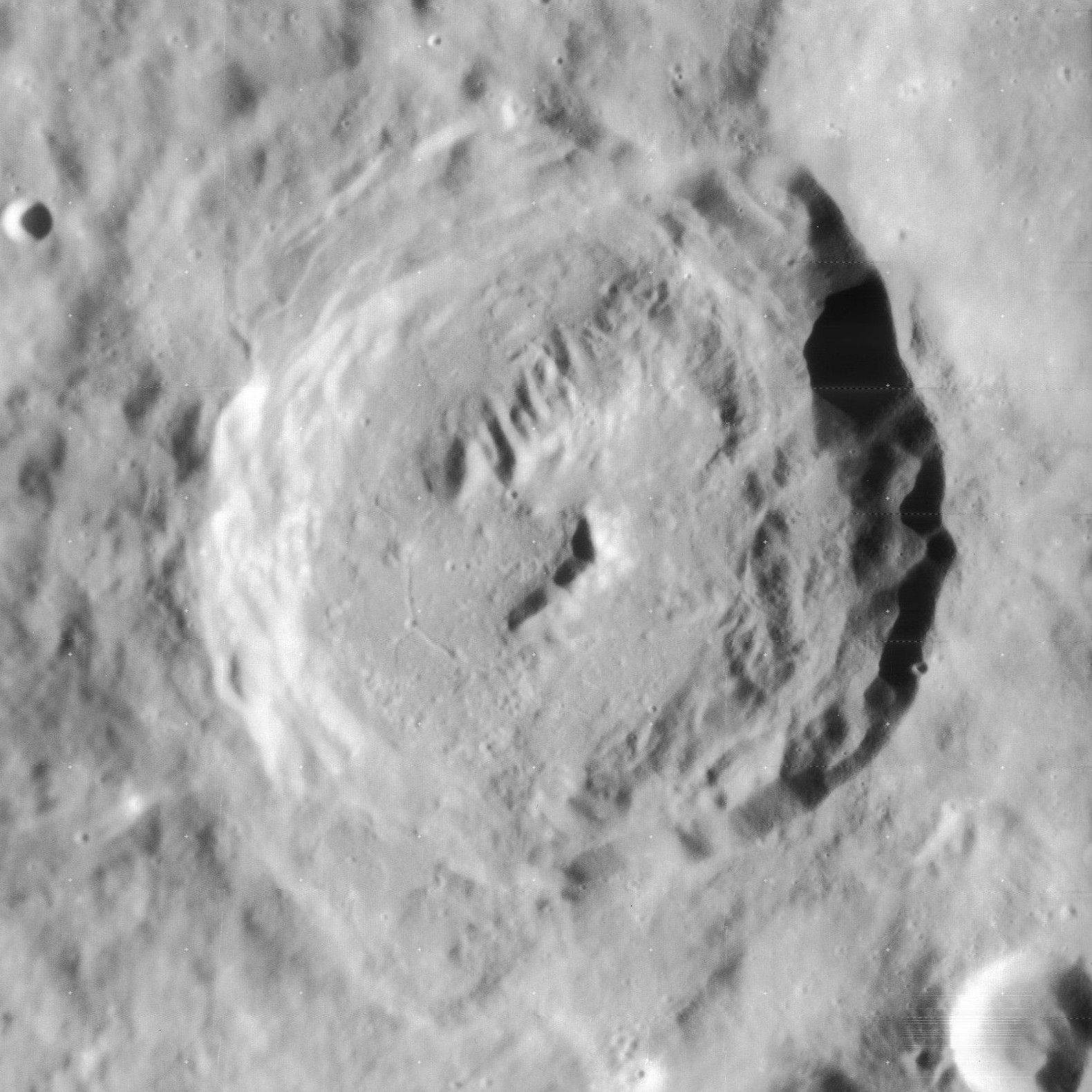
- Lunar Orbiter 4 image, facing northwest
- Coordinates: 42.75°S 41.84°E
- Diameter: 78.9 km (49.0 mi)
- Depth: 2.5 km
- Colongitude: 319° at sunrise
- Formation: Eratosthenian
- Eponym: David Fabricius

Fabricius is a lunar impact crater that is located within the northeast part of the walled plain named Janssen. Attached to the north-northwest rim is the slightly larger crater Metius.

The crater is 78 kilometers in diameter and 2,500 meters deep. It dates from the Eratosthenian period of the lunar geologic timescale, 3.2 to 1.1 billion years ago. Fabricius has a generally rough floor and multiple central peaks that rise to 0.8 km, with a rugged rise to the northwest running north–south. The infrared spectrum of pure crystalline plagioclase has been identified on these rises. The rim is lumpy and somewhat distended, most noticeably to the southwest and south. It reaches altitudes of 2.9 km in places.

This crater is named after Dutch astronomer David Fabricius (1564-1617). His name was included in the lunar nomenclature of Italian astronomer Giovanni B. Riccioli as Fabritius in 1651. Its modern designation was formally adopted by the International Astronomical Union in 1935.

== Satellite craters ==
By convention these features are identified on lunar maps by placing the letter on the side of the crater midpoint that is closest to Fabricius.

Fabricius	Latitude	Longitude	Diameter
A	44.6° S	44.0° E	45 km
B	43.6° S	44.9° E	17 km
J	45.8° S	45.2° E	16 km
