= From the Earth to the Moon =

1865 novel by Jules Verne

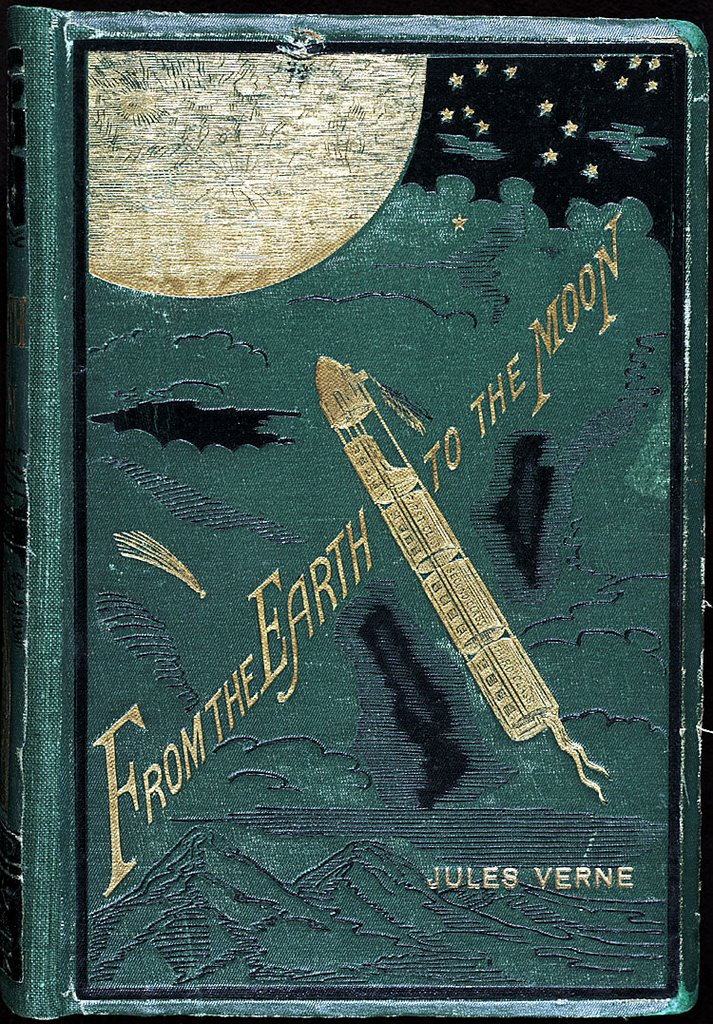
- Cover of an early English translation
- Author: Jules Verne
- Original title: De la terre à la lune
- Translator: Anonymous (1867); J. K. Hoyt (1869); Louis Mercier & Eleanor Elizabeth King (1873); Edward Roth (1874); Thomas H. Linklater (1877); I. O. Evans (1959); Lowell Bair (1967); Jacqueline and Robert Baldick (1970); Harold Salemson (1970); Walter James Miller (1996); Frederick Paul Walter (2010); William Butcher (2025)
- Illustrator: Émile-Antoine Bayard and Alphonse-Marie de Neuville
- Language: French
- Series: Voyages Extraordinaires #4; Baltimore Gun Club #1
- Genre: Science fiction
- Publisher: Pierre-Jules Hetzel
- Publication date: 1865
- Publication place: France
- English publication date: 1867
- Media type: Print (Hardback)
- Preceded by: Journey to the Center of the Earth
- Text: From the Earth to the Moon at Wikisource

From the Earth to the Moon: A Direct Route in 97 Hours, 20 Minutes (French: De la Terre à la Lune, trajet direct en 97 heures 20 minutes) is an 1865 novel by Jules Verne. It tells the story of the Baltimore Gun Club, a post–American Civil War society of weapons enthusiasts, and their attempts to build an enormous Columbiad space gun and launch three people – the Gun Club's president, his Philadelphian armor-making rival, and a French poet – in a projectile with the goal of a Moon landing. Five years later, Verne wrote a sequel called Around the Moon. There are two modern unabridged English translations by Walter James Miller (1978) and Frederick Paul Walter (2010).

== Background ==
Verne's novel was not the first literary work to recount a journey to the Moon; these include A True Story, by Lucian (second century AD), Francis Godwin's The Man in the Moone (1638), the Comical History of the States and Empires of the Moon (1657) by Cyrano de Bergerac, John Wilkins's novel The Discovery of a World in the Moone of 1638, and Voyage de Milord Céton dans les sept planètes, ou Le nouveau Mentor by Marie-Anne Robert which appeared in Paris in 1756.

The story is notable in that Verne attempted to do some rough calculations as to the requirements for the cannon and in that, considering the comparative lack of empirical data on the subject at the time, some of his figures are remarkably accurate. However, his version of a space gun for a non-rocket spacelaunch turned out to be impractical for safe human space travel since a much longer barrel would have been required to reach escape velocity while limiting acceleration to survivable limits for the passengers.

The character of Michel Ardan, the French member of the party in the novel, was inspired by the real-life photographer Félix Nadar.

In 1889 Verne wrote a second sequel to the novel, The Purchase of the North Pole, which has the Gun Club members (led by J. T. Maston) plan to use the Columbiad to alter the tilt of the Earth to enable the mineral wealth of the Arctic region to be put within reach of exploitation.

== Plot ==
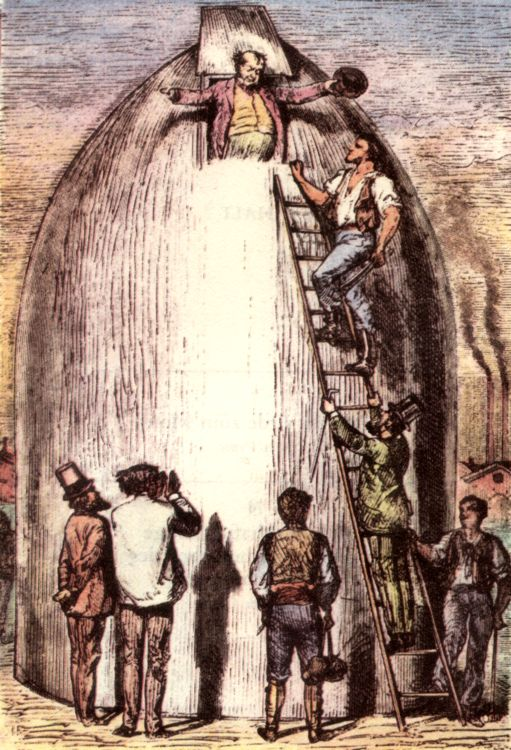
The projectile, as pictured in an engraving from the 1872 Illustrated Edition

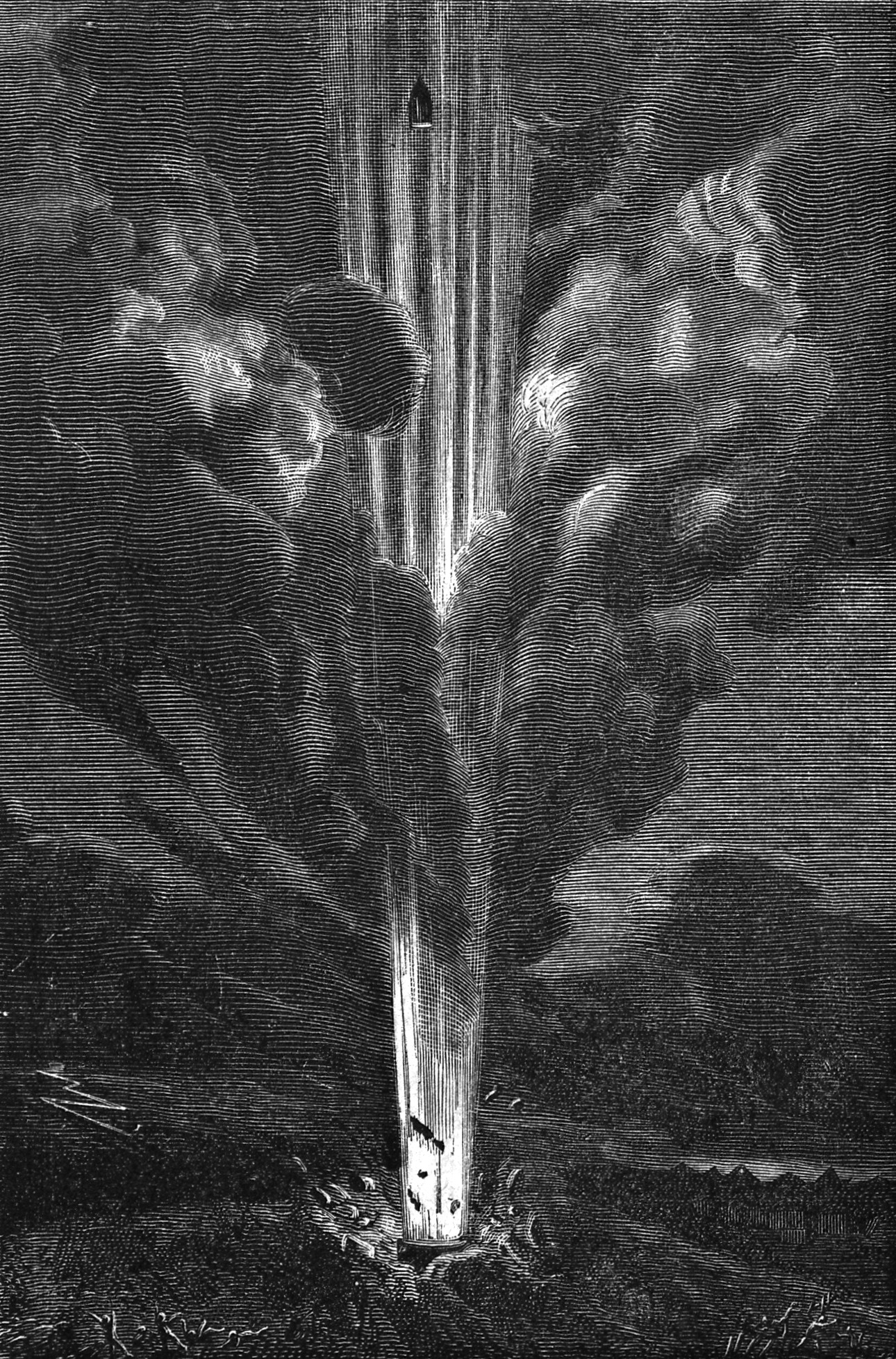
The firing of the Columbiad

The story opens some time after the end of the American Civil War. The Baltimore Gun Club, a society dedicated to the design of weapons of all kinds (especially cannons), comes together when Impey Barbicane, its president, calls them to support his latest idea. He's done some calculations, and believes that they could construct a cannon capable of shooting a projectile to the Moon. After receiving the support of his companions, another meeting is held to decide the place from which the projectile will be fired, the dimensions and materials of both the cannon and the projectile, and which kind of powder they are to use.

An old enemy of Barbicane, a Captain Nicholl of Philadelphia, designer of plate armor, declares that the entire enterprise is absurd and makes a series of bets with Barbicane, each of them of increasing amount, over the impossibility of such a feat.

The first obstacle, enough money to construct the giant cannon (and against which Nicholl has bet $1,000), is raised from a number of countries in America and Europe. Notably, the U.S. donates four million dollars, whilst England, at first, does not give anything. In the end, nearly five and a half million dollars are raised, which ensures the financial feasibility of the project.

Stone's Hill in "Tampa Town", Florida is chosen as the site for the cannon's construction. The Gun Club travels there and begins construction of the Columbiad cannon, which requires the excavation of a 900-foot-deep (270 m) and 60-foot-wide (18 m) circular hole, which is completed in the nick of time, but a surprise awaits Barbicane: Michel Ardan, a French adventurer, plans to travel to the Moon aboard the projectile.

During a meeting between Ardan, the Gun Club, and the inhabitants of Florida, Nicholl appears and challenges Barbicane to a duel. The duel is stopped when Ardan—having been warned by J. T. Maston, secretary of the Gun Club—meets the rivals in the forest where they have agreed to duel. Meanwhile, Barbicane finds the solution to the problem of surviving the incredible acceleration that the explosion would cause. Ardan suggests that Barbicane and Nicholl travel with him in the projectile, and his proposition is accepted.

In the end, the projectile is successfully launched, but the destinies of the three astronauts are left inconclusive. The sequel, Around the Moon, deals with what happens to the three men during their voyage from the Earth to the Moon.

== Influence on popular culture ==
The novel was loosely the inspiration for the 1875 opera Le voyage dans la lune, music by Jacques Offenbach, without the permission of the author.

In 1880 The Pall Mall Gazette described Verne’s Columbiad as a 'space-ship' – the first recorded use of this term in history.

In H. G. Wells' 1901 novel The First Men in the Moon (also relating to the first voyagers to the Moon) the protagonist, Mr. Bedford, mentions Verne's novel to his companion, Professor Cavor, but it is mentioned that Cavor is, "not a reader of fiction".

The novel (along with Wells' The First Men in the Moon) inspired the first science fiction film, A Trip to the Moon, made in 1902 by Georges Méliès; in 1958, another film adaptation of the story was released, titled From the Earth to the Moon and in 1967 became the basis for the very loose adaptation Jules Verne's Rocket to the Moon (1967), a caper-style British comedy starring Burl Ives and Terry-Thomas. The 1961 Czechoslovak film The Fabulous Baron Munchausen combines characters and plot elements from the Verne novel with those of the stories of Baron Munchausen and Cyrano de Bergerac.

In March 1953, the Gilberton Company published a comic-book adaptation of From the Earth to the Moon as issue No. 105 in its Classics Illustrated series. An unidentified scriptwriter combined Verne's From the Earth to the Moon with the sequel, Around the Moon. Gilberton art director Alex A. Blum supplied both the cover painting and the 44 pages of interior art. The title went through twelve printings between 1953 and 1971.

During their return journey from the Moon, the crew of Apollo 11 made reference to Jules Verne's book during a TV broadcast on 23 July, 1969. The mission's commander, astronaut Neil Armstrong, said, "A hundred years ago, Jules Verne wrote a book about a voyage to the Moon. His spaceship, Columbia [sic], took off from Florida and landed in the Pacific Ocean after completing a trip to the Moon. It seems appropriate to us to share with you some of the reflections of the crew as the modern-day Columbia completes its rendezvous with the planet Earth and the same Pacific Ocean tomorrow."

In 1991 Origin Systems released "Ultima: Worlds of Adventure 2: Martian Dreams". Set during the 1893 World's Columbian Exposition, the game featured a space gun similar to the one described in the book, though it was aimed at mars, rather than the moon.

In the 2010 The Quantum Thief trilogy, the protagonist enters an uneasy alliance with the "Gun Club zoku", who specialize in military weaponry, and in The Causal Angel (2014) after escaping Earth using a nuclear-powered space gun, sells the "Verne gun bullet" to them as a unique collectible item; author Hannu Rajaniemi is a fan of Verne.

The Japanese anime adaption of the Space Brothers (2012–2014) opening for episodes 39-51 ("Small World" by Fujifabric) was a parody of the story, even ending with the cover of an early English translation.

The first incarnation in 1995 of the roller coaster Space Mountain in Disneyland Paris, named Space Mountain: De la Terre à la Lune, was based loosely on the novel. The attraction's exterior used a Verne era retro-futuristic influence, with a rivet and boiler plate effect and the "Columbiad", which recoils with a bang and produces smoke as the train passes, giving riders the perception of being shot into space. At D23 2026 Disney announced that the current star wars vesion will close in 2027. The ride will return to its original theme and story.

In 2026, upon the splashdown return of Artemis II from the historic lunar flyby around the Moon back to Earth and the first test flight of Orion (spacecraft) with crew members; NASA Public Affairs Officer and commentator Rob Navias (also known as the 'Voice of NASA') made reference to Verne, stating "Splashdown confirmed at 7:07 pm Central Time, 5:07 pm Pacific Time, from the pages of Jules Verne to a modern day mission to the moon, a new chapter of the exploration of our celestial neighbour is complete". This was during the official live broadcast of the landing shown by NASA on YouTube.

== See also ==
- Around the Moon (1870 sequel)
- The First Men in the Moon, 1901 novel by H. G. Wells
- Apollo 8
- Apollo 11
- Artemis II
- Verneshot
- Moon in science fiction
- Amédée Guillemin
- Apollo command and service module, the US lunar spacecraft whose dimensions were "predicted" by Verne's novel
- Project HARP
- Project A119
