= Hrušov =

Hrušov may refer to places:

== Czech Republic ==
- Hrušov (Mladá Boleslav District), a municipality and village in the South Bohemian Region
- Hrušov (Ostrava), an administrative part of Ostrava in the Moravian-Silesian Region

== Slovakia ==
- Hrušov, Rožňava District, a municipality and village in the Košice Region
- Hrušov, Veľký Krtíš District, a municipality and village in the Banská Bystrica Region
- Hrušov Castle, a ruined castle in the Nitra Region
