= Ferdinand Hochstetter =

Austrian anatomist

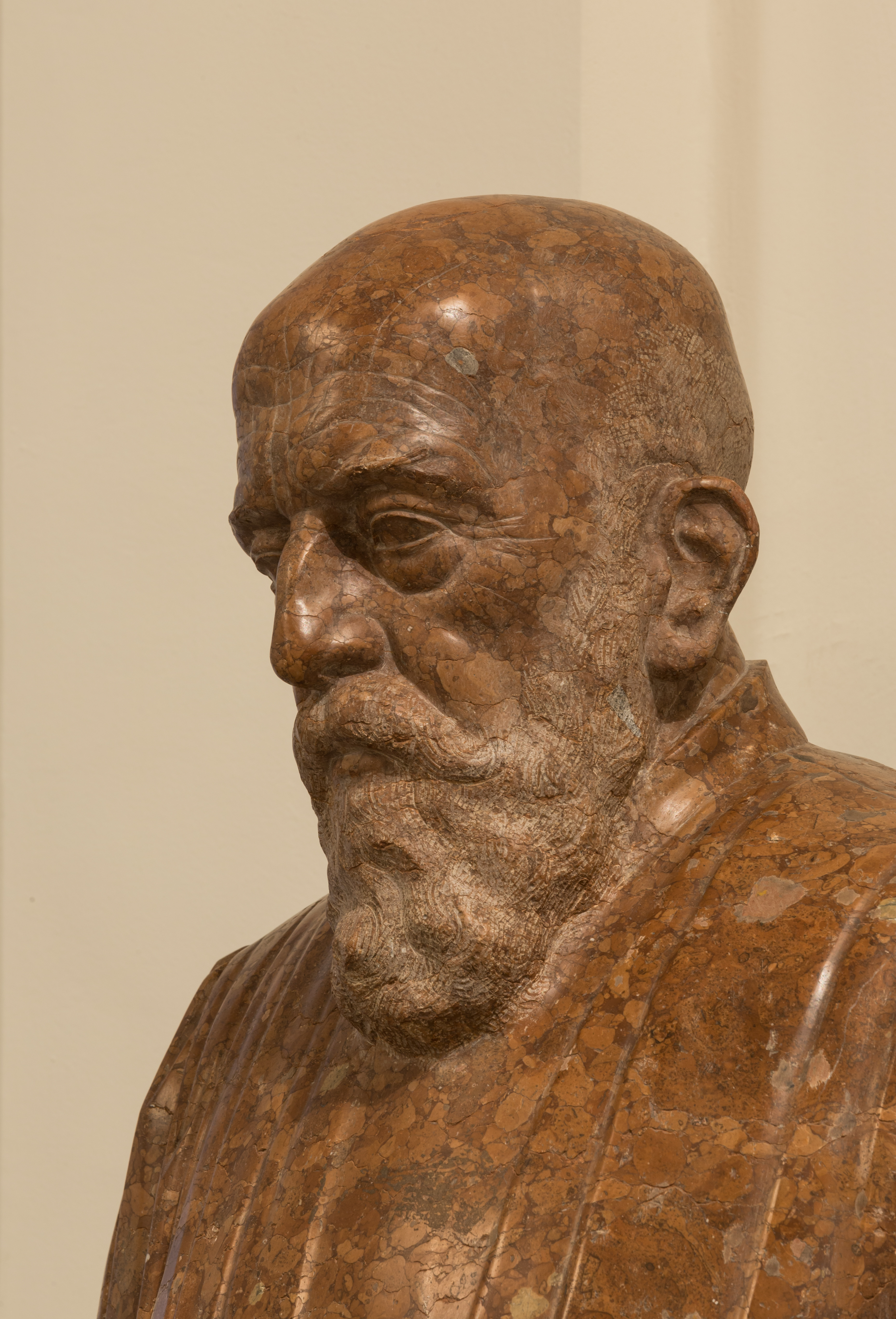
Bust of Hochstetter

Ferdinand Hochstetter (February 5, 1861 – November 10, 1954) was an Austrian embryologist, anatomist and a professor of medicine at the University of Vienna.

== Life and work ==
Hochstetter was born in Hruschau in Austrian Silesia to Carl Christian and Justine née Bengough. He studied medicine at the University of Vienna and became a demonstrator in 1882 and worked at the anatomical institute under Karl Langer. He completed his habilitation in 1888 and became an associate professor in 1892. He became a full professor at the University of Innsbruck in 1896 and in 1908 he returned to Vienna to succeed Carl Toldt as a second anatomical chair and remained there until his retirement in 1932. He worked on Toldt's anatomical atlas, serving as an editor from the 12th (1921) to the 22nd (1951) editions. He was involved in attempts to improve the nomenclature used in anatomy. After retirement he continued to work at the Josephinum until his death.

Hochstetter took an interest in evolutionary anatomy and worked on comparative anatomy and evolution of the human brain, heart and vascular system. He developed a method of preparing plant and animal material in paraffin that preserved colour and shape and technique for high contrast staining. He developed a collection of embryological specimens using his preservation technique. His students included Eduard Pernkopf, Konrad Lorenz, Heinrich von Hayek, Drago Perović, and Albert Narath. Lorenz became an assistant to Hochstetter in 1931 after Hochstetter retired in 1934 Pernkopf succeeded as head of anatomy. In 1938 Lorenz applied for his own funding and received testimony from Hochstetter and Pernkopf who also vouched for Lorenz' growing interest in national socialism. Pernkopf began his own anatomical atlas project, making use of Nazi victims.
