= Kokoszka =

Kokoszka may refer to:

== Places ==
- Kokoszka, Lublin Voivodeship (east Poland)
- Kokoszka, Masovian Voivodeship (east-central Poland)
- Kokoszka, Pomeranian Voivodeship (north Poland)
- Kokoszka, Warmian-Masurian Voivodeship (north Poland)

== People with the surname ==
- Adam Kokoszka (born 1986), Polish footballer
- Leszek Kokoszka (born 1951), Polish ice hockey player
- Marcin Kokoszka (born 1984), Polish footballer

== See also ==
- Kokoschka
- Kokoska
