= Izidor Papo =

Colonel general Izidor Papо KBE
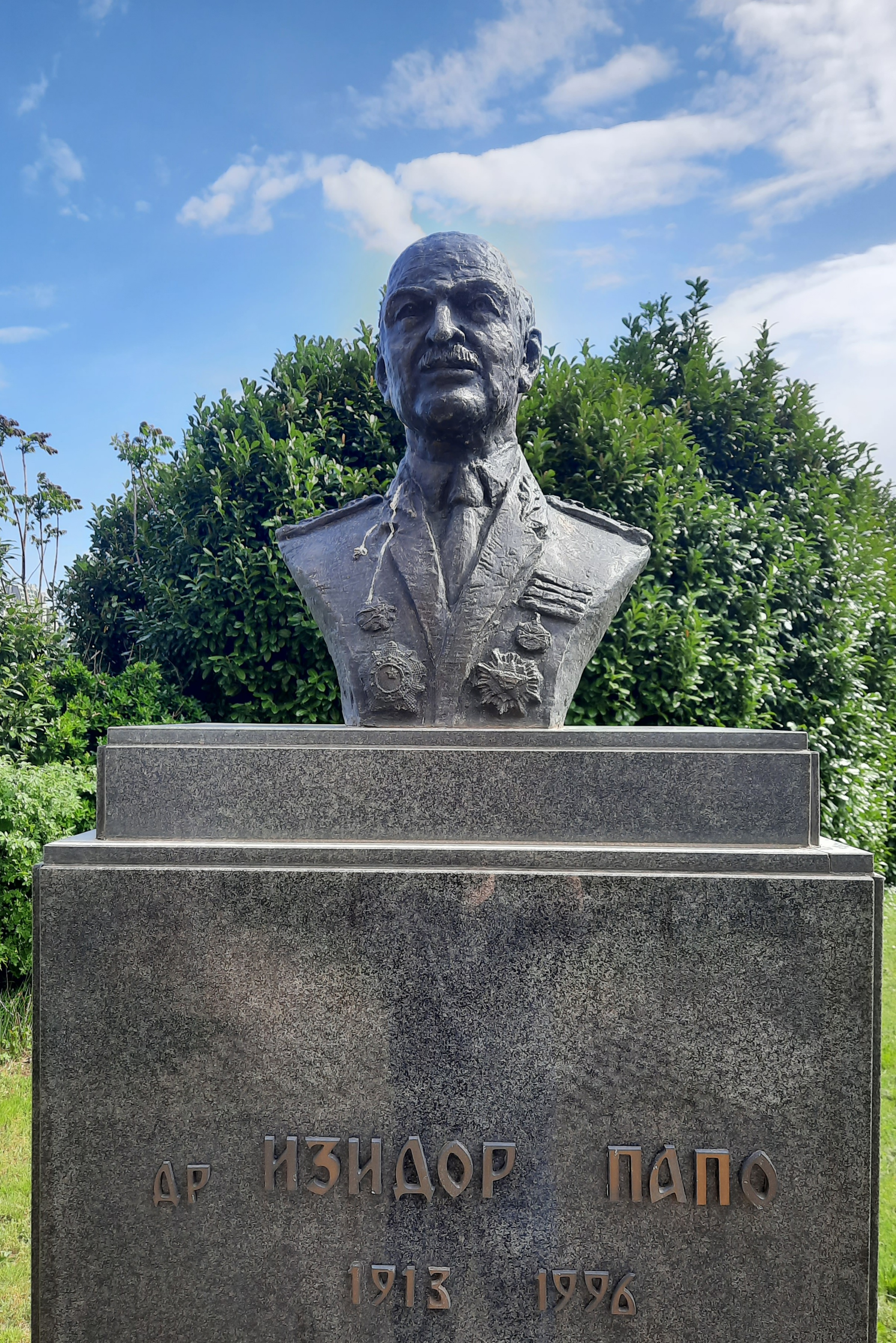
- Dr. Izidor Papo monument
- Born: 13 December 1913; Ljubuški, Austria-Hungary
- Died: 14 October 1996 (aged 82); Belgrade, Federal Republic of Yugoslavia
- Burial place: Sephardic Jewish Cemetery
- Other names: Isidor Papo; Izidor Prpić
- Education: School of Medicine, University of Zagreb
- Occupations: Surgeon; general; military surgeon general; academician
- Years active: 1937–1981
- Awards
- Medical career
- Profession: Physician; surgeon
- Field: Cardiac surgery

Izidor Papo (Serbo-Croatian Cyrillic: Изидор Папо) KBE (1913–1996) was a Yugoslav surgeon, colonel general, military surgeon general and academician.

== Early life and education ==
Papo was born on 13 December 1913 in Ljubuški, Austria-Hungary (present-day Bosnia and Herzegovina) to Jozef Papo, a municipal clerk, and Klara Papo (née Levy).

Papo grew up in Mostar as part of a Bosnian Sephardi Jewish family. In 1932, Papo enrolled at the University of Zagreb School of Medicine where he studied under Drago Perović and Julije Budisavljević. Following graduation in 1937, Papo completed his mandatory internship and military service in Sarajevo.

== Career ==
Following the Axis powers' invasion of Yugoslavia, he joined the national liberation movement in 1941 and the partisan army in 1942 as doctor of the Mostar battalion, head of the 3rd division and partisan army supreme command surgical staff. He became a member of the Communist Party in June 1943. He graduated from the military medical academy in Leningrad where he studied under surgeons such as Sergei Yudin, Alexander Bakulev and Alexander Vishnevsky. in 1947 and became chief army surgeon and head of the surgical department of the army medical academy in Belgrade.

After the war, Papo turned to heart, lung and respiratory system surgery. His greatest achievements were in heart surgery. He performed 2,000 open heart operations and gave 400 of his patients artificial heart valves. He was elected as assistant professor in 1950, an associate professor in 1953 and professor in 1956. He was also promoted to general-colonel of the Yugoslav Army's medical unit in 1975.

Between 1963-66 he served as Surgical Section's President. That period saw very intensive work by the Section. He invited prominent surgeons from abroad to hold lectures at the Section's meetings. He became a correspondent member of the Serbian Academy of Sciences and Arts (SANU) in 1961 and a regular member in 1968.

He was a correspondent member of the academy of Bosnia and Herzegovina and Peru, a member of the French surgical academy and many international associations. He won the AVNOJ (the Antifascistic Council for the People's Liberation of Yugoslavia) and Belgrade October awards. He received a number of Yugoslav and foreign decorations. Papo published 217 works in extenso, 13 of which abroad.

== Later years ==
Papo served over 30 years as chief surgeon of the Yugoslav People's Army (JNA). He retired in 1982 and died on 14 October 1996, aged 82, and was buried in the Jewish Cemetery in Belgrade.

== Personal life ==
Papo married Anastazija "Asja" Papo, (née Salakin;1922-2009), a surgical nurse.

Both Papo and Asija are buried at the Sephardic Jewish Cemetery in Belgrade.

== Publications ==
- Papo, Izidor (1980). Ratna hirurgija [War surgery] (in Serbian). Belgrade: Vojnoizdavački zavod; Institut za vojnomedicinske naučne informacije i dokumentaciju.
