= Świebodzice =

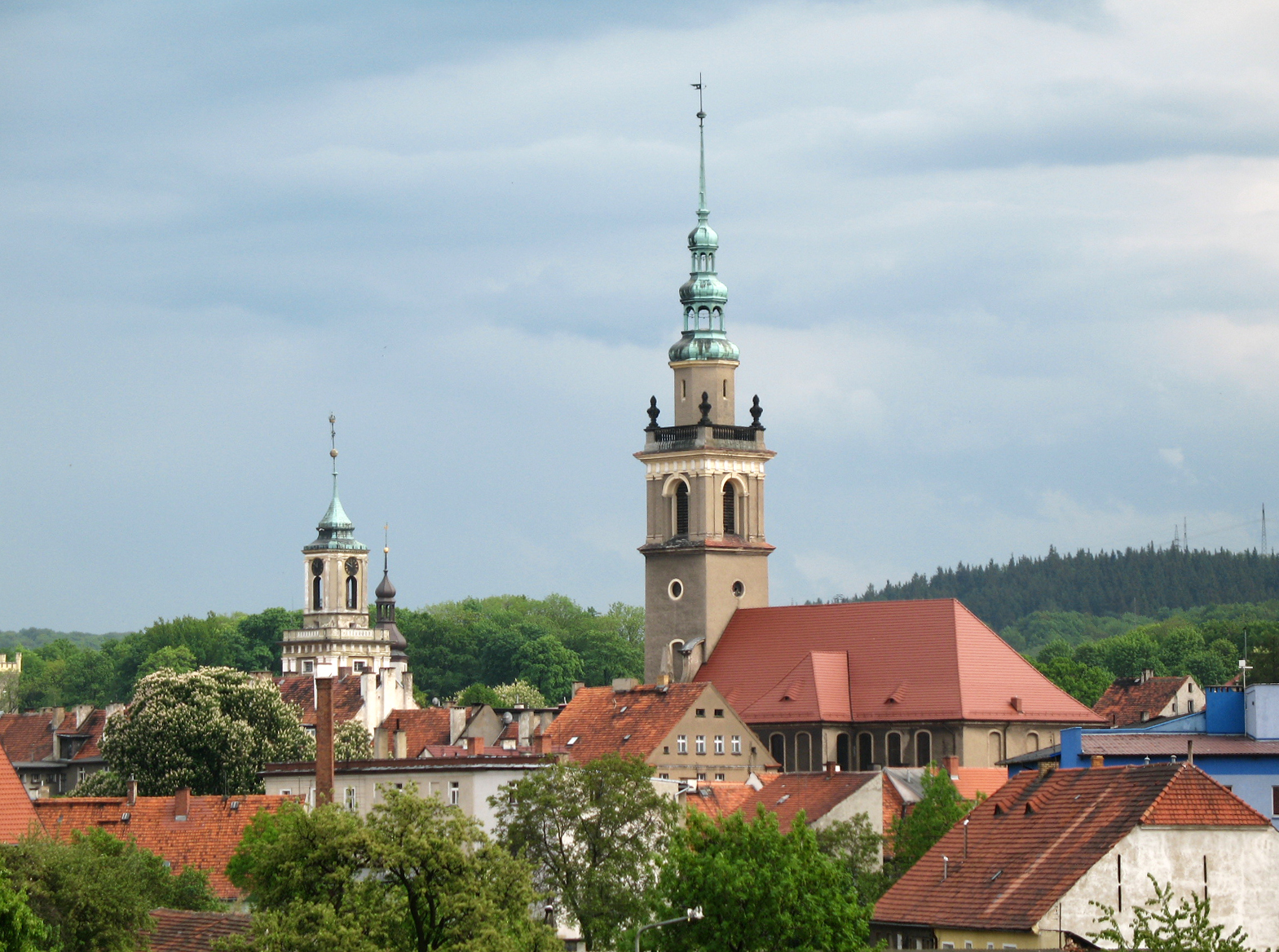
- Skyline with the towers of the town hall (on the left) and of the Saints Peter and Paul Church (on the right)

- Flag Coat of arms

- Location within Poland
- Coordinates: 50°52′N 16°20′E
- Country: Poland
- Voivodeship: Lower Silesian
- County: Świdnica
- Gmina: Świebodzice (urban gmina)

Government
  - Mayor: Paweł Ozga

Area
  - Total: 30.45 km^{2} (11.76 sq mi)

Population (2019-06-30)
  - Total: 22,793
  - Density: 748.5/km^{2} (1,939/sq mi)
- Time zone: UTC+1 (CET)
  - Summer (DST): UTC+2 (CEST)
- Postal code: 58-160
- Car plates: DSW
- Website: https://www.swiebodzice.pl

Świebodzice (Polish: [ɕfjɛbɔˈd͡ʑit͡sɛ]; German: Freiburg) is a town in south-western Poland with 22,793 inhabitants (as of 2019). It is situated in Świdnica County, Lower Silesian Voivodeship.

The town is situated close to Książ Castle, which during World War II, together with the cave complex, was expanded to create private quarters for Adolf Hitler.

== History ==
=== Medieval period ===
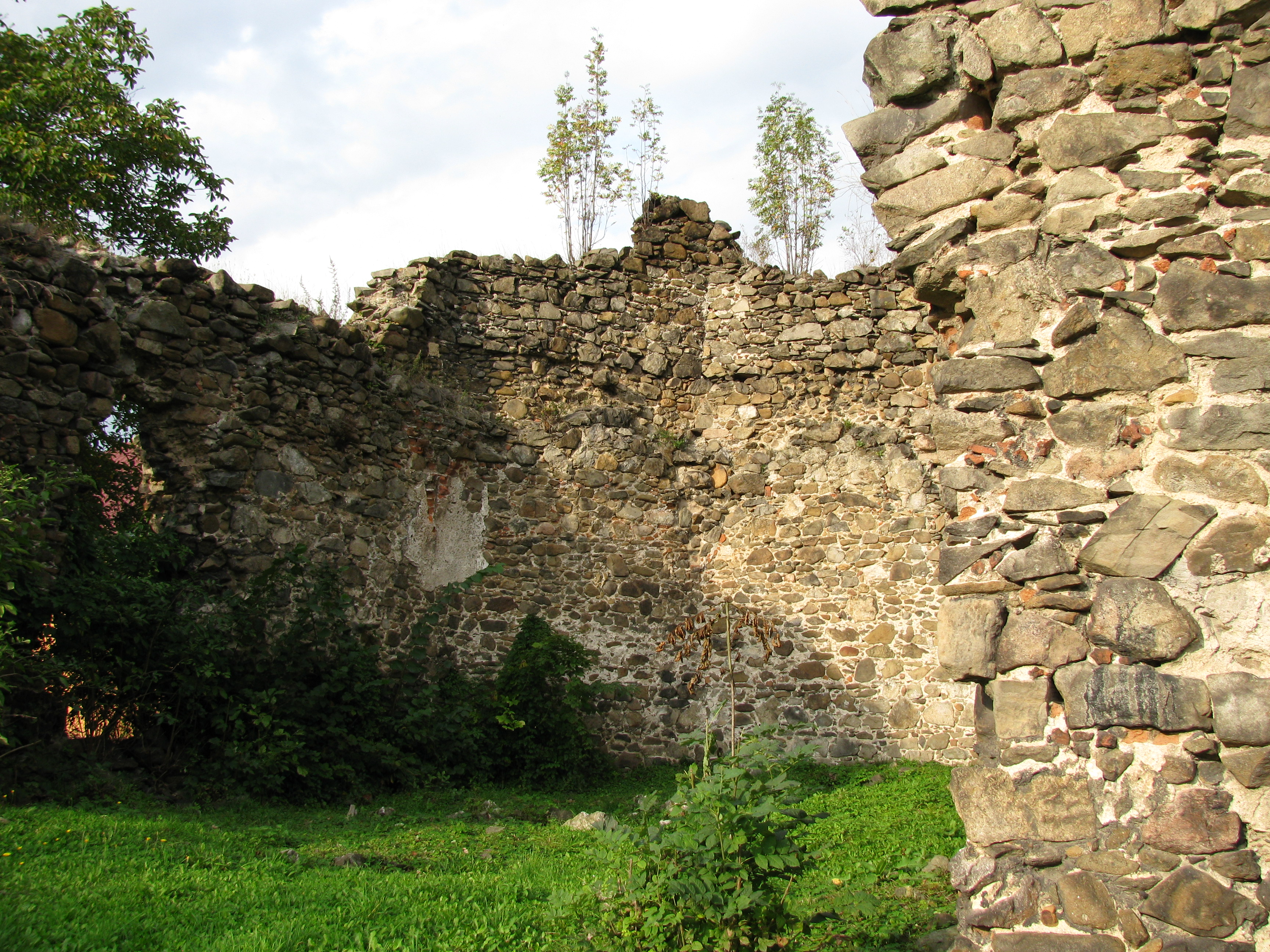
Ruins of the medieval Saint Anne church

The town dates back to the medieval Kingdom of Poland. By 1220, there was a populous settlement. A Romanesque church was built during the rule of Duke Henry the Bearded, and consecrated by Bishop Wawrzyniec of Wrocław in 1228. In 1243, Merboto de Czertheres, knight and close friend of Duke Bolesław II the Horned, was granted the local castle. The castle was a defensive point against possible Czech invasions, however, it lost its importance after the construction of the nearby Książ Castle by Duke Bolko I the Strict. It was granted town rights by 1279, as it was mentioned as a town by Duke Henry Probus that year. In 1291, defensive walls were erected and a guild organization was established. The town received its coat of arms either in 1291 or 1337. Town rights were revoked in 1310 and restored in 1337.

In 1427, the town withstood three attacks by the Hussites. King Vladislaus II established the annual so-called warm fair and an annual weekly market in 1492 and 1510, respectively.

=== Modern period ===
In 1615–1617, part of the population died due to the epidemic. During the Thirty Years' War, the town was occupied by Swedish troops in 1633, then it was occupied and plundered twice by the Imperial troops in 1634–1635. In 1639, part of the town wall was made higher. Swedish and Imperial forces clashed in the area further several times in 1642–1648. The town suffered fires in 1640, 1680, 1681, 1688 and 1774. In 1702, the weekly market was moved from Mondays to Tuesdays. The town's first grain market was held in 1706. As of 1740, the town had 18 guilds.

Several clashes of the Silesian Wars took place in the town and its vicinity. In 1741, the town was occupied and then annexed by Prussia. In 1745, it was the site of a battle between Prussians, Austrians and Hungarians, and then was recaptured by Prussians. In 1757, it was captured by the Austrians, who made it their headquarters during the siege of nearby Świdnica, and the location of a military hospital. In December 1757, Prussian troops recaptured the town and brought an epidemic that resulted in the deaths of about 1,000 residents. In early 1758 the town was the main headquarters of the Prussian Army and was visited by King Frederick the Great, and afterwards a small Prussian garrison remained stationed in the town. On 22 June 1759, the Austrians won another battle against the Prussians, but soon retreated, and the town was once again garrisoned by the Prussians. Austrians returned in June 1760, then the Prussians in November 1760. In 1762 fights occurred again.

During the Napoleonic Wars, in 1807–1808, allied French, Württemberg, Bavarian and Saxon soldiers were stationed in the town. In 1809, a linen and cloth factory was established, employing more than 1,300 people. Various armies passed through the town in 1812–1813. The town received a railroad connection to Wrocław and Wałbrzych in 1843 and 1853, respectively. In 1848, it was visited by poet Juliusz Słowacki. A clock factory and a merchant and craft bank were established in 1847 and 1862, respectively. A military hospital was located in the town during the Austro-Prussian War of 1866. A new water supply system was built and electric street lighting was launched in 1895–1897 and 1898, respectively.

=== 20th century ===
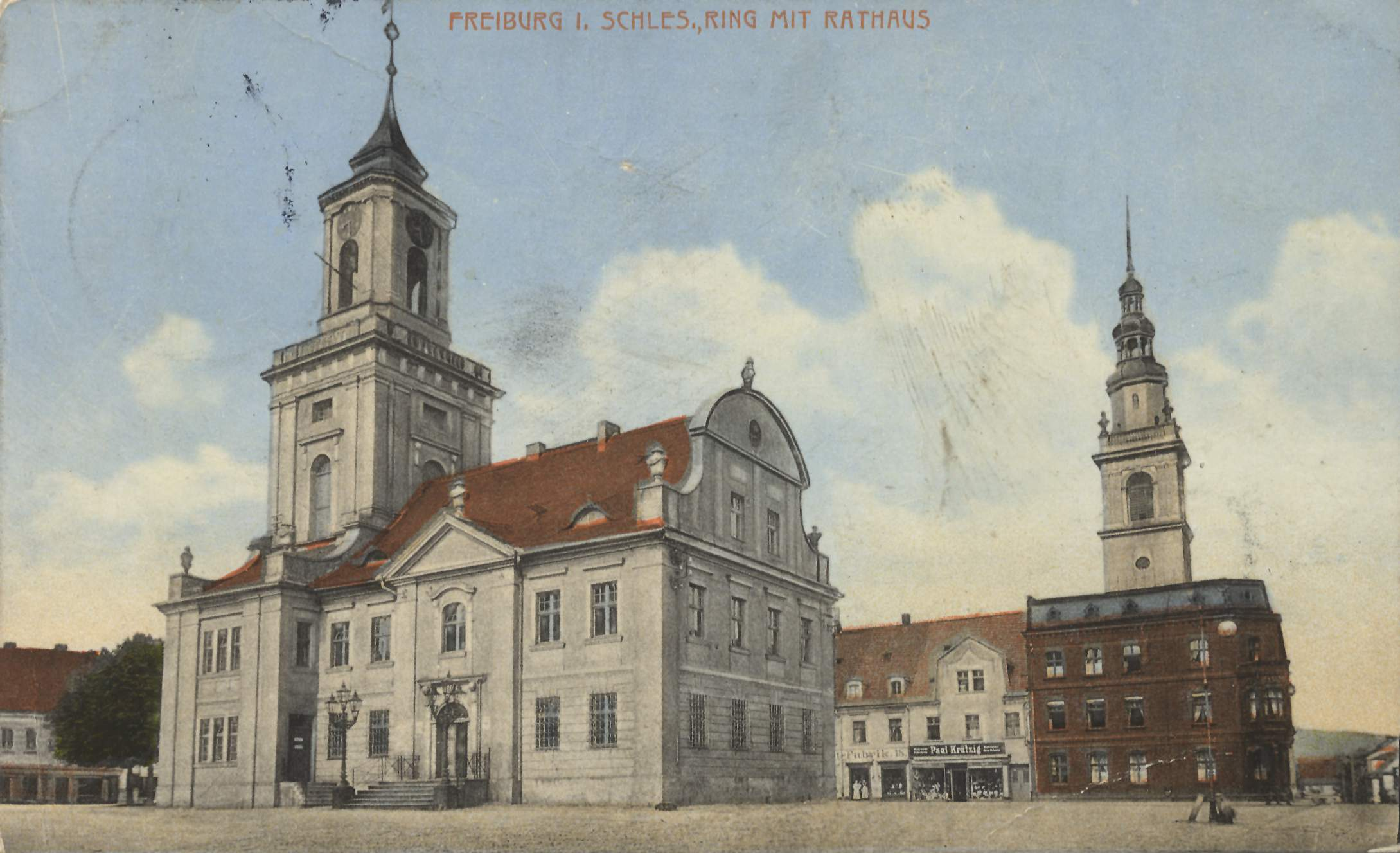
Early-20th-century view of the Market Square

Many of the town's residents participated and died in World War I. The townspeople collected donations for the Red Cross and a hospital for wounded soldiers was established in the town.

During World War II, local industry was subordinated to German armaments needs. The Germans established and operated a forced labour camp for Jewish men and a subcamp of the Gross-Rosen concentration camp, in which a total of more than 1,000 Jewish women were subjected to forced labour. The retreating Germans dismantled and transported equipment from local factories to the west.

After the war, still in 1945, factories for electrical machinery, linen, home appliances, chocolate and furniture resumed work, and a food cooperative, cinema, elementary school and kindergarten were established. In 1951, a rope and technical cord factory and a brewery were opened. In 1952, the Famalen Textile Industry Machine Repair Plant was established. In 1953 Pełcznica, and in 1973 Ciernie, were included within the town limits as its new districts. From 1975 to 1998, Świebodzice was administratively located in the Wałbrzych Voivodeship. In 1976, new neighborhoods of single-family houses Metalowiec and Wilcza Góra were built. The town was struck by the 1997 Central European flood, which resulted in one person drowning and material damage estimated at 7 million złotys.

== Sports ==
Victoria Świebodzice football club is based in Świebodzice.

== Notable people ==
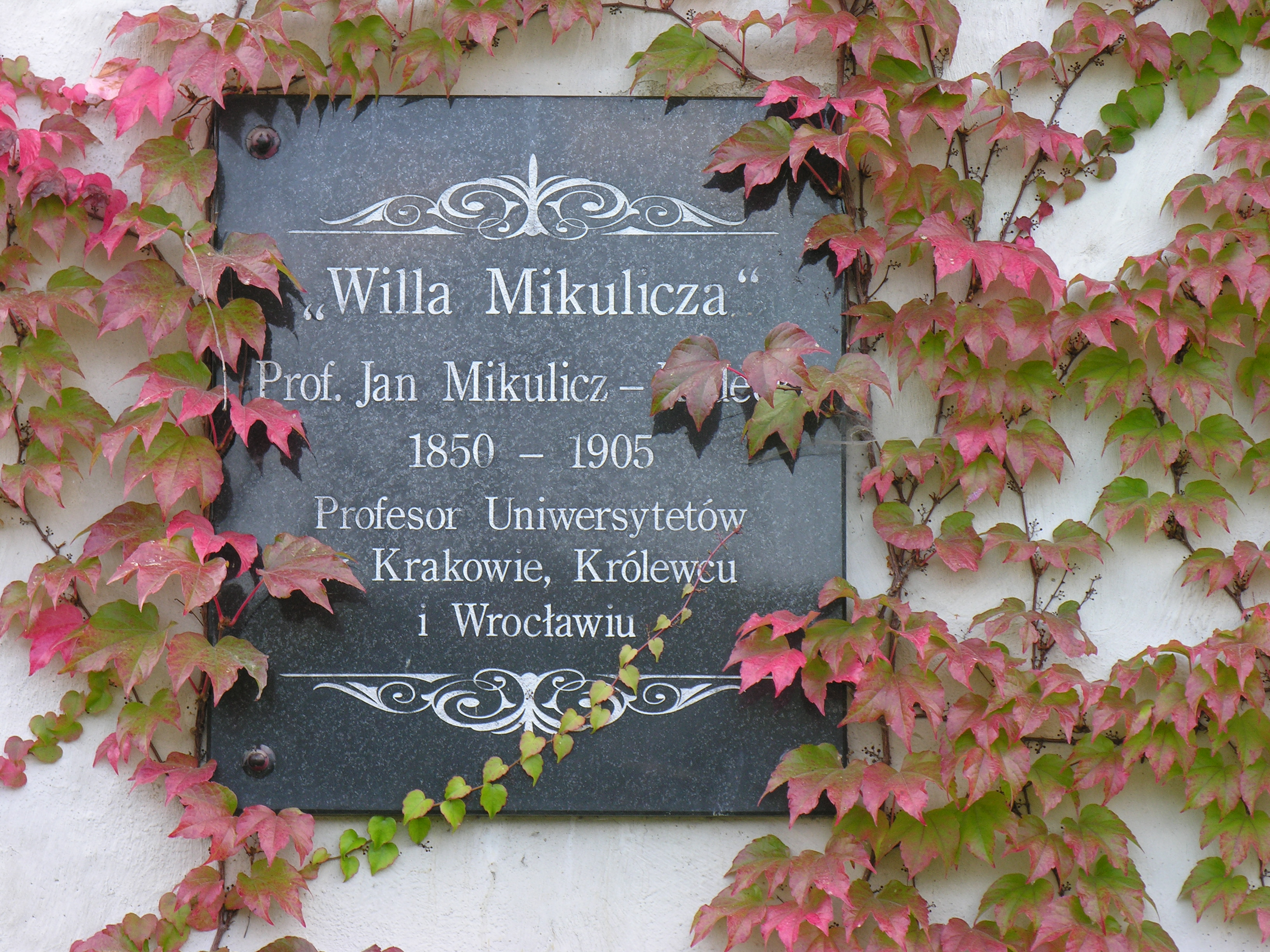
Memorial plaque to Jan Mikulicz-Radecki at his former home

- Gustav Becker (1819–1885), German clockmaker
- Jan Mikulicz-Radecki (1850–1905), Polish surgeon, one of the pioneers of antiseptics and aseptic techniques
- Alfred Zucker (1852–1913), German architect
- Emil Krebs (1867–1930), German scientist, noted polyglot who spoke a total of 68 languages at the time of his death
- Anna Zalewska (born 1965), politician, former Minister of National Education of Poland
- Krzysztof Stelmach (born 1967), former Polish volleyball player with 274 games played for the Poland men's national volleyball team
- Jarosław Krzyżanowski (born 1975), retired Polish footballer
- Eliza Surdyka (born 1977), Polish Olympic cross-country skier
- Marcin Kokoszka (born 1984), Polish footballer
- Paweł Fajdek (born 1989), Polish hammer-thrower

== Twin towns – sister cities ==
Świebodzice is twinned with:

- Hrušov, Slovakia
- Jilemnice, Czech Republic
- Marjina Horka, Belarus
- Waldbröl, Germany

== Gallery ==
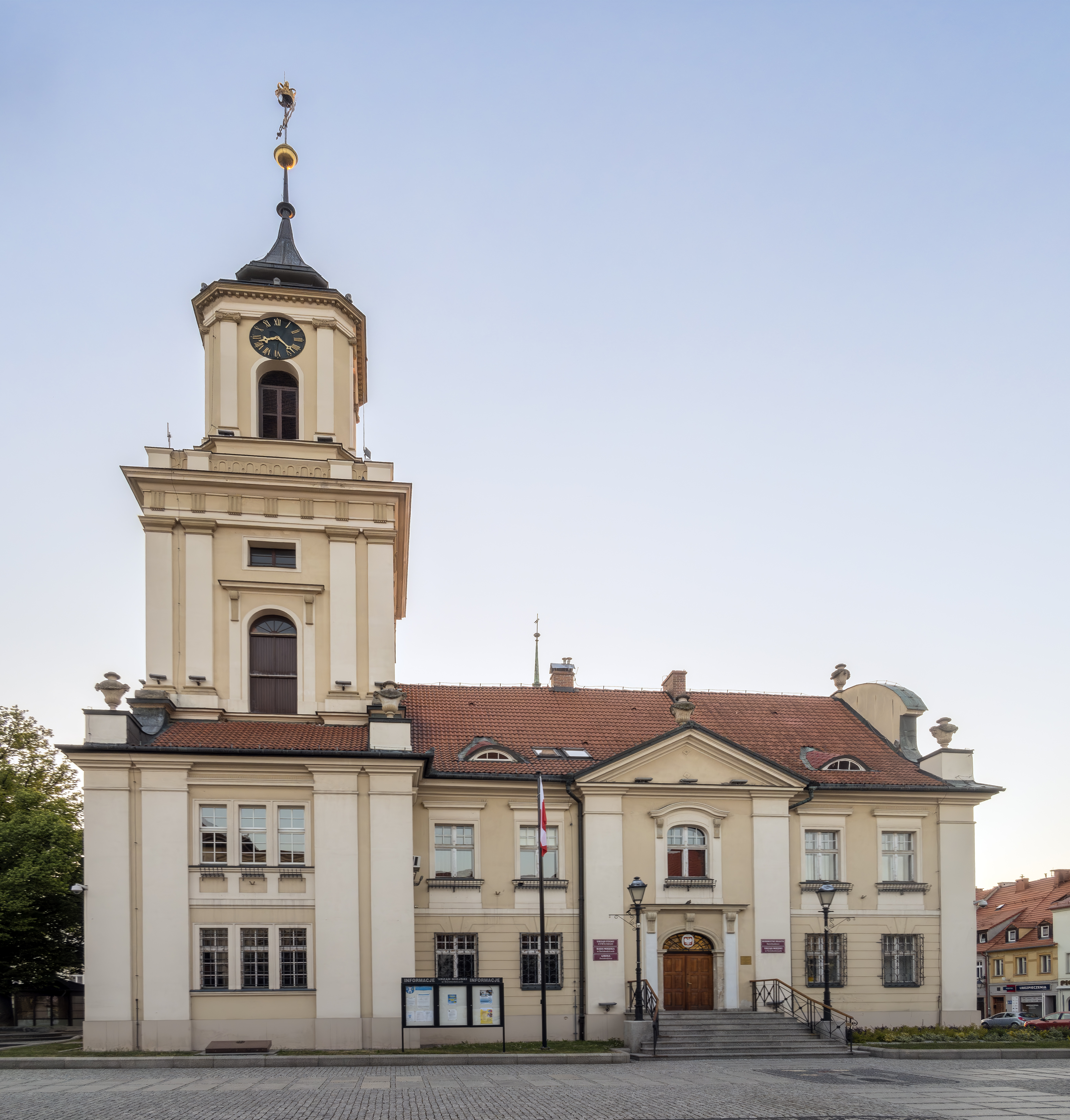
Town hall

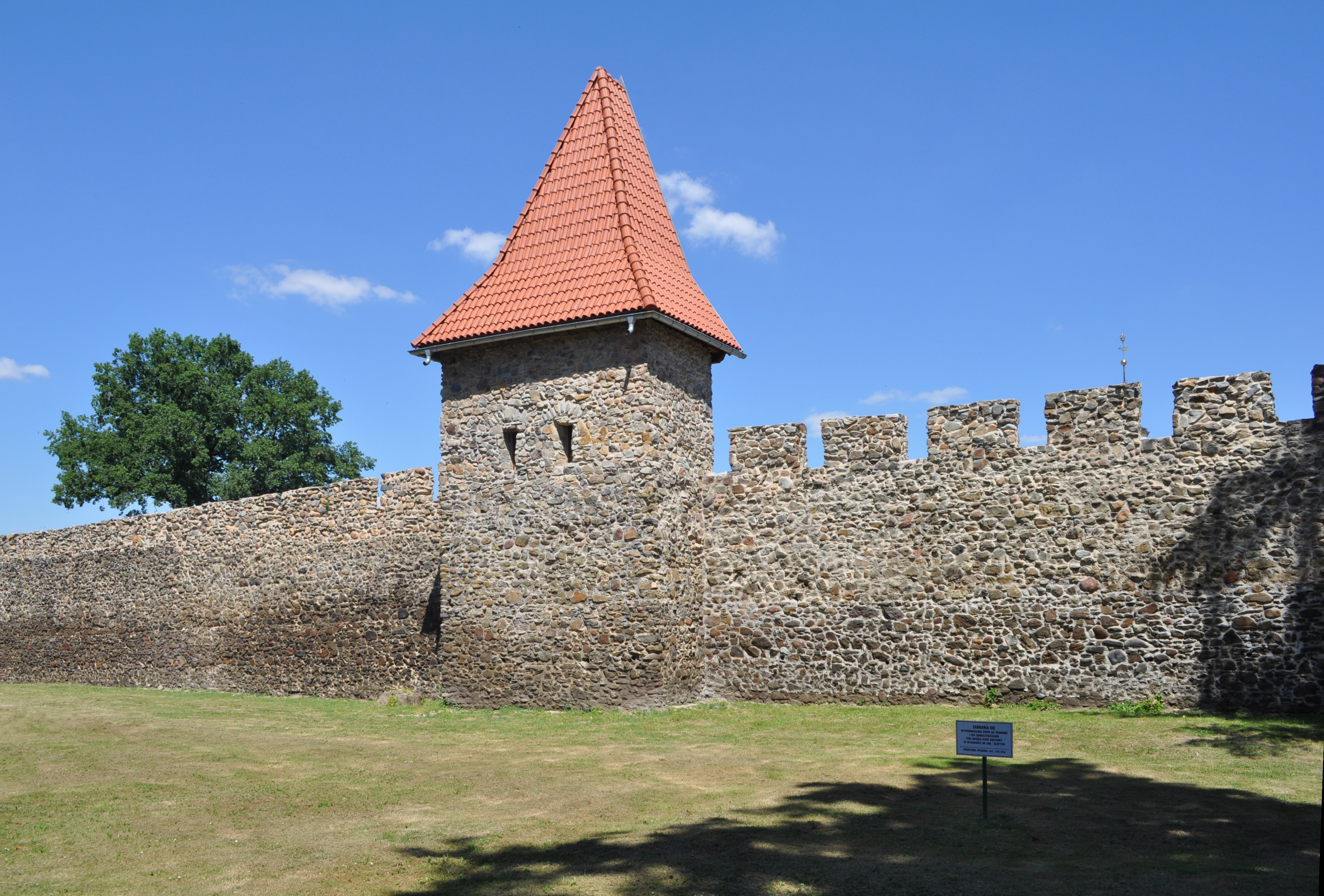
Medieval town walls

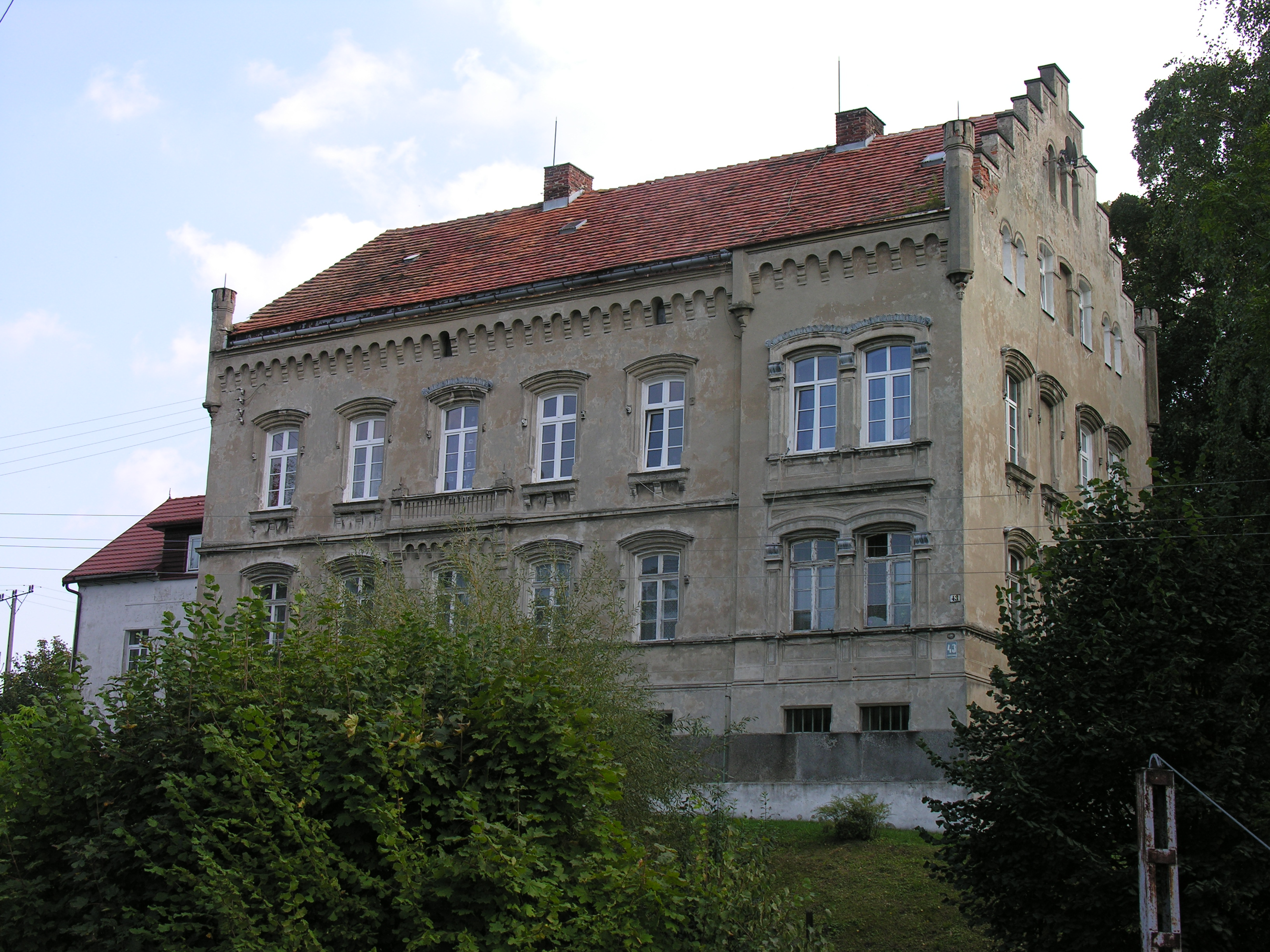
Villa of Jan Mikulicz-Radecki

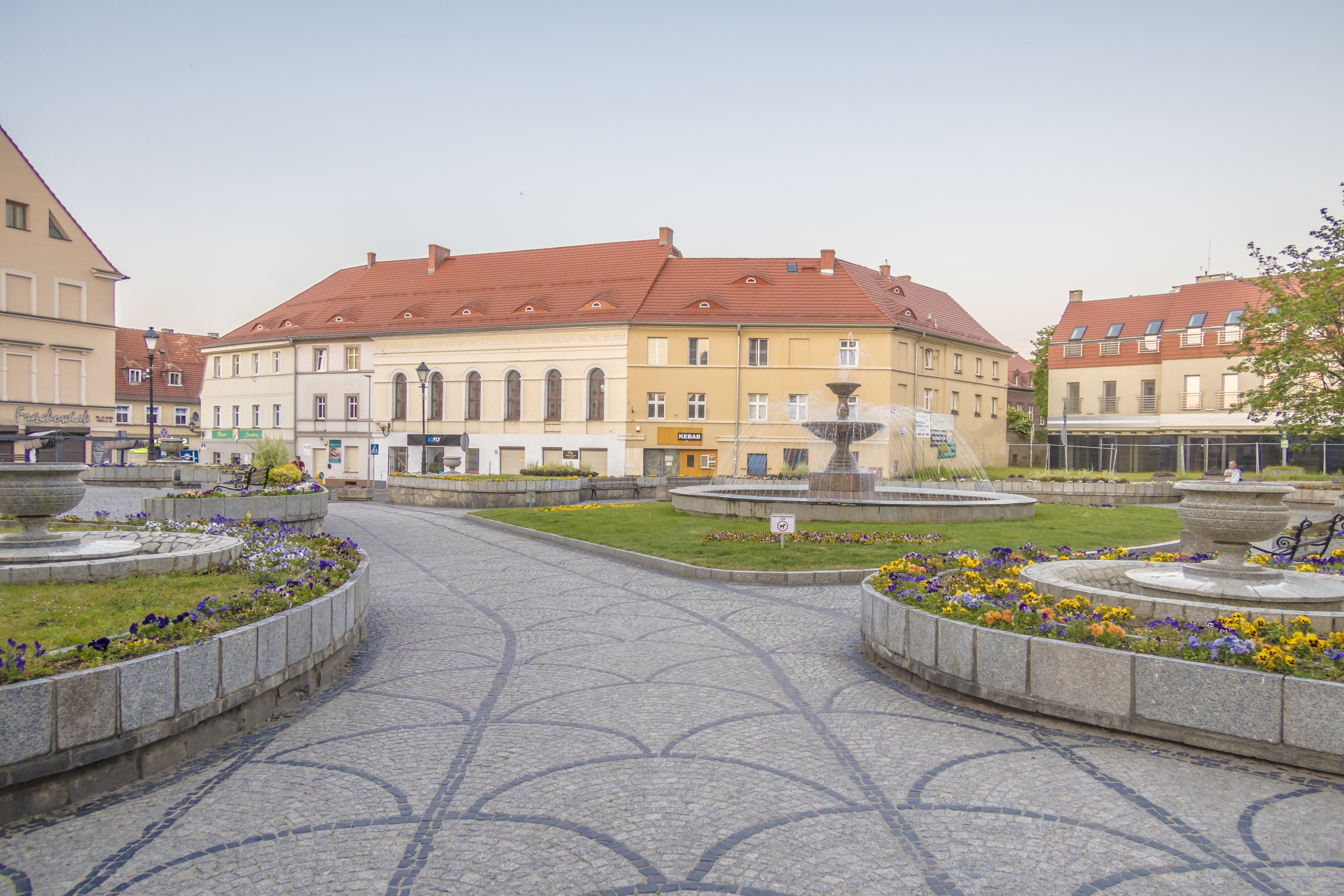
John Paul II Square

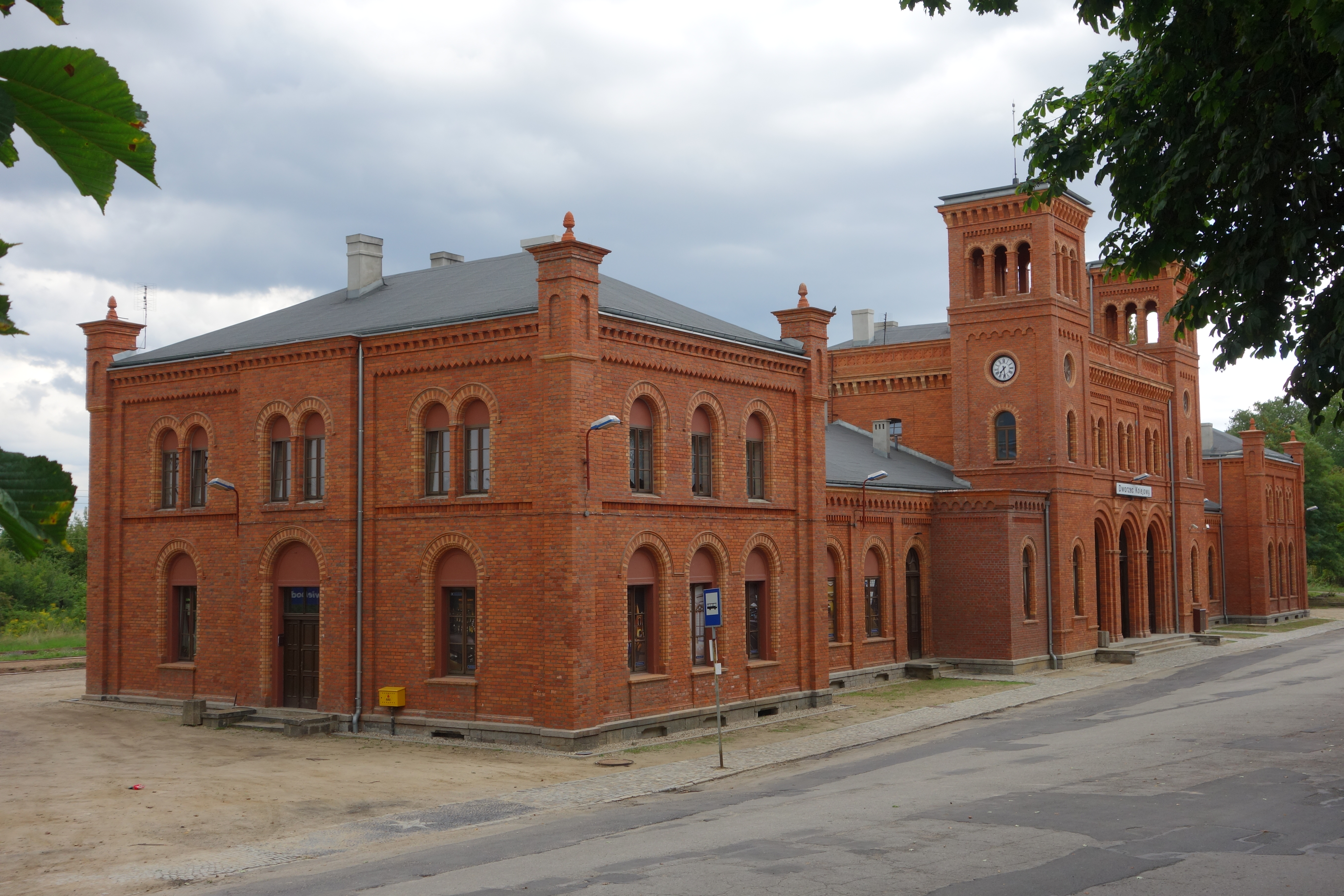
Train station
