= Hostie =

Hostie Keresztúr
- Municipality
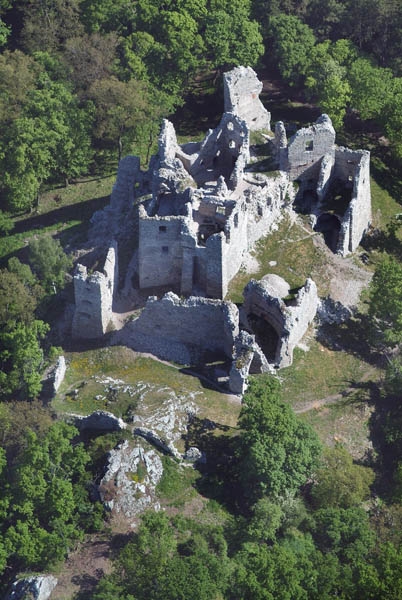
- Hrušov Castle

- Flag

- Location of Hostie in the Nitra Region Location of Hostie in Slovakia
- Coordinates: 48.45°N 18.44°E
- Country: Slovakia
- Region: Nitra Region
- District: Zlaté Moravce District
- First mentioned: 1332

Area
  - Total: 28.16 km^{2} (10.87 sq mi)
- Elevation: 248 m (814 ft)

Population (2025)
  - Total: 1,164
- Time zone: UTC+1 (CET)
  - Summer (DST): UTC+2 (CEST)
- Postal code: 951 94
- Area code: +421 37
- Vehicle registration plate (until 2022): ZM
- Website: www.hostie.sk

Hostie (Hungarian: Keresztúr) is a village and municipality in the Zlaté Moravce District of the Nitra Region, in western-central Slovakia.

== History ==
In historical records the village was first mentioned in 1332.

== Geography ==
The municipality lies at an altitude of 248 metres (814 ft) and covers an area of 28.16 km^{2} (10.87 sq mi) (2025).

== Population ==
Population statistic (10 years)
| Year | 1995 | 2005 | 2015 | 2025 |
|---|---|---|---|---|
| Count | 1225 | 1226 | 1243 | 1164 |
| Difference | | +0.08% | +1.38% | −6.35% |

Population statistic
| Year | 2024 | 2025 |
|---|---|---|
| Count | 1186 | 1164 |
| Difference | | −1.85% |

It has a population of 1164 people (31 December 2025).

=== Ethnicity ===
Census 2021 (1+ %)
| Ethnicity | Number | Fraction |
|---|---|---|
| Slovak | 1181 | 97.68% |
| Not found out | 21 | 1.73% |
| Total | 1209 | |

In year 2021 was 1209 people by ethnicity 1181 as Slovak, 21 as Not found out, 9 as Czech, 6 as Other, 4 as Polish, 2 as Russian, 1 as Austrian, 1 as Moravian and 1 as Hungarian.

Note on population: The difference values of population numbers in the table "Population statistic" and in the sections "Ethnicity" & "Religion" is caused by the use of various statistical methods.

=== Religion ===
Census 2021 (1+ %)
| Religion | Number | Fraction |
|---|---|---|
| Roman Catholic Church | 1004 | 83.04% |
| None | 170 | 14.06% |
| Not found out | 19 | 1.57% |
| Total | 1209 | |

In year 2021 was 1209 people by religion 1004 from Roman Catholic Church, 170 from None, 19 from Not found out, 9 from Ad hoc movements, 4 from Evangelical Church, 1 from Calvinist Church, 1 from Christian Congregations in Slovakia and 1 from United Methodist Church.

== Facilities ==
The village has a small public library a gym and football pitch.

== Genealogical resources ==
The records for genealogical research are available at the state archive "Statny Archiv in Nitra, Slovakia"

- Roman Catholic church records (births/marriages/deaths): 1762-1895 (parish B)

== See also ==
- List of municipalities and towns in Slovakia
