= Gustav Becker =

German clockmaker (1819–1885

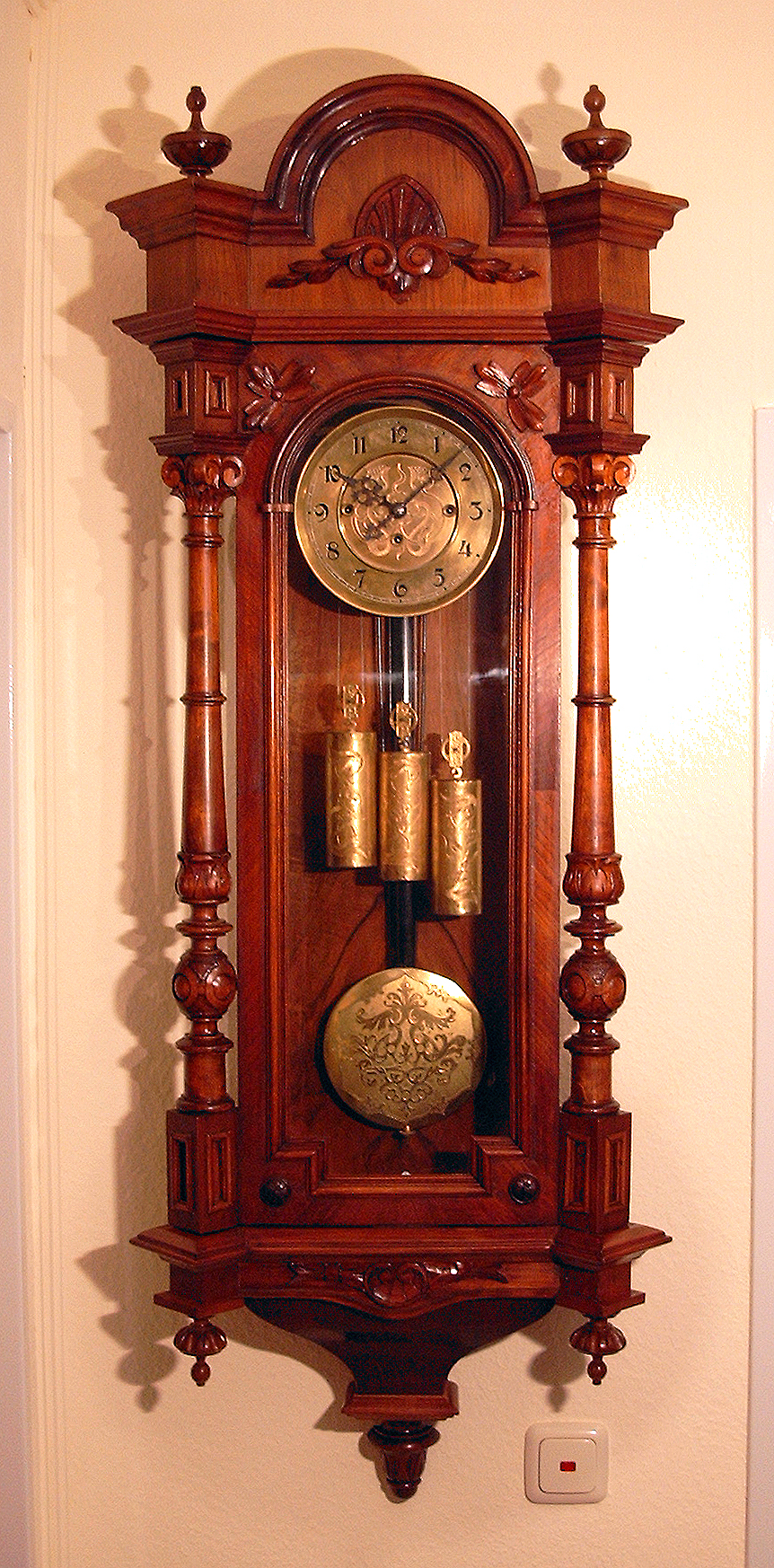
A Gustav Becker wall clock.

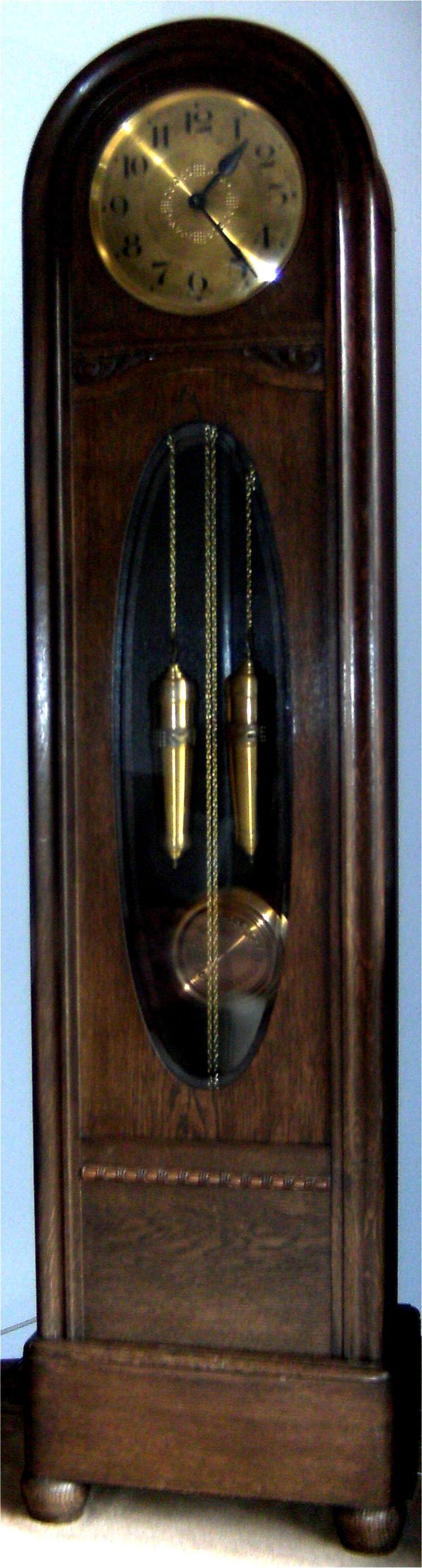
A Gustav Becker grandfather clock (around 1910).

Gustav Eduard Becker (May 2, 1819 in Oels, Silesia – September 17, 1885 in Berchtesgaden) was a German clockmaker and founder of the brand Gustav Becker.

== Biography ==
=== Early life ===
Becker learned clockmaking in Silesia and enriched his skills by learning from many masters around Germany which, during that era, was the most important country in the clock industry. His great skills gave him the ability to fix clocks at the most intricate level. During his time in Vienna, he decided to start his own clock factory.

=== Early career ===
Becker came back to Silesia in 1845, and got married. In 1847, he settled in Freiburg, Lower Silesia (now Świebodzice, Poland), and that April he opened a small clock shop with a few employees to whom he taught clockmaking. First, he created clocks in the Viennese model, and thanks to his success, in 1850 he moved his business to a better business centre.

=== Success ===
His breakthrough came in 1852 at the Silesian Clock Fair. Crowds were drawn to his works because of the quality, and he was awarded the gold medal for the best clock in the fair. In 1854 he received large orders from the British Royal Mail, and the Silesian Telegraphy Centre. After the orders, he received a fortune from the Duke of Martibore, and with this money he could pay enough to make clock cases for train stations. In the 1860s, he began to create the Classical Gustav Becker clocks. Starting from fairly simple clocks, the clocks became complex and very ornamental, and sales rose to a peak in 1875, with over 300,000 clock orders. He won at clock fairs in London, Paris, Sydney, Melbourne, Berlin and Amsterdam.

=== Competition with the Black Forest clockmakers ===
During the 1880s, the Black Forest clockmakers began competing with Becker, with good quality, less-expensive models. A well-known type of Black Forest clock is the cuckoo clock. With the decline of sales, Becker stopped selling complex clocks, and returned to making more simple designs.

=== Death ===
Gustav Becker died on 14 September 1885 in Berchtesgaden during a stay in Bavaria. He was buried three days later in a municipal cemetery in Freiburg (now Świebodzice) to much public mourning.

== The brand Gustav Becker ==
The brand was created in 1899, and in 1930 it merged with Junghans, a large clockmaker in Schramberg, Baden-Württemberg, in southwestern Germany. After the Second World War, the Gustav Becker factory's location was transferred from Germany to Poland, and clock production there ceased. Junghans continued to exist in West Germany, but clocks bearing the Becker brand were no longer produced.
