= Eliza Surdyka =

Polish cross-country skier

Personal information
- Nationality: Polish
- Born: 16 March 1977 (age 48); Świebodzice, Poland

Sport
- Sport: Cross-country skiing

Eliza Surdyka (born 16 March 1977) is a Polish cross-country skier. She competed in the women's 15 kilometre classical at the 1998 Winter Olympics.
