= Ernest April =

American anatomist (1939–2021)

Ernest Wilfred April (1939 - 2021) was an American professional anatomist at the Columbia University College of Physicians and Surgeons who gained prominence for his controversial defense of the use of Nazi medical drawings in anatomy textbooks. He was best known for championing Pernkopf atlas, a volume composed by leading Austrian Nazi Eduard Pernkopf. April described the atlas as "a phenomenal book, very complete and thorough and authoritative."

April earned his undergraduate degree at Tufts University in 1961 and his Ph.D. in anatomy from Columbia University's College of Physicians and Surgeons in 1969. He was appointed course director of gross anatomy in 1971 and served in that position until 2009. He stepped down from his teaching role after a Title IX investigation in 2010.

In addition to running the human anatomy program at Columbia University, April served for many years as a Republican and Conservative councilman in Rutherford, New Jersey.
