= Kokoska =

Kokoska (Serbo-Croatian: Kokoška) is a surname. Notable people with the surname include:

- Brian Kokoska (born 1988), Canadian-American artist
- Steve Kokoska, Australian footballer

== See also ==
- Kokoschka
- Kokoszka (disambiguation)
