= Jarosław Krzyżanowski =

Polish footballer

Personal information
- Date of birth: 10 February 1975 (age 51)
- Place of birth: Świebodzice, Poland
- Height: 1.74 m (5 ft 9 in)
- Position: Midfielder

Team information
- Current team: Zagłębie Lubin II (assistant)

Senior career*
Years	Team	Apps	(Gls)
1992–1993	Victoria Świebodzice		
1993–1995	Lechia Dzierżoniów		
1995–2003	Zagłębie Lubin	179	(8)
2003–2004	Górnik Polkowice	15	(1)
2005	AEL Limassol	9	(2)
2005–2006	Lilas Vassilikou	23	(3)
2006–2007	Miedź Legnica	26	(0)
2007–2009	Wisła Płock	35	(1)
2010–2012	Victoria Świebodzice		
2012–2017	AKS Strzegom		

Managerial career
- 2010–2012: Victoria Świebodzice (player-manager)
- 2012–2017: AKS Strzegom (player-manager)
- 2017–2018: Zagłębie Lubin U19
- 2018–2021: Zagłębie Lubin II (assistant)
- 2021–2023: Zagłębie Lubin II
- 2025: Zagłębie Lubin U19
- 2025–: Zagłębie Lubin II (assistant)
- * Club domestic league appearances and goals

Jarosław Krzyżanowski (born 10 February 1975) is a Polish professional football manager and former player who played as a midfielder, mostly for Polish clubs. He is currently the assistant coach of III liga club Zagłębie Lubin II.

== Honours ==
=== Manager ===
Zagłębie Lubin II

- III liga, group III: 2021–22
