= Albert Narath =

Austrian surgeon and anatomist

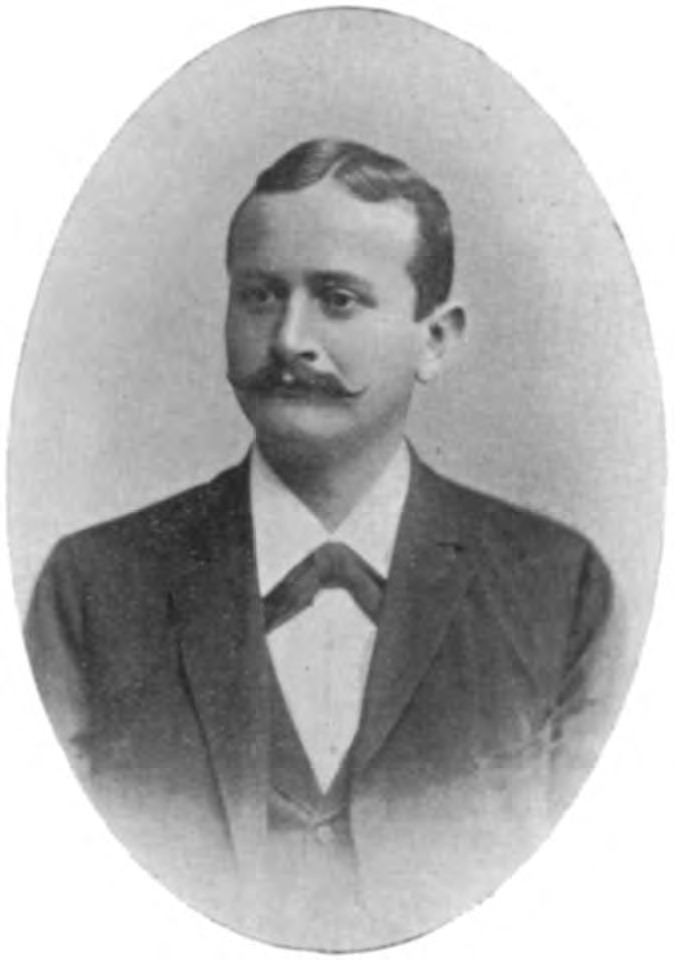
Albert Narath

Albert Narath (13 September 1864, Vienna – 15 August 1924, Heidelberg) was an Austrian surgeon and anatomist. He served as a professor of surgery at the University of Utrecht (1896-1906) and at the University of Heidelberg (1906-1910). He is best known for his work on hernias. A form of hernia is named after him as Narath hernia.

== Life and work ==
Narath was born in Vienna and studied medicine there, graduating in 1890. He then became an assistant of anatomy under Emil Zuckerkandl until 1891. He then trained in surgery and in 1893 he became an assistant at the university clinic under Theodor Billroth (1829-1894) and Carl Gussenbauer at the University of Vienna, and from 1896 to 1906 was a professor of surgery at Utrecht succeeding Anton Eiselsberg who had moved to Konigsberg. In 1906 he succeeded Vincenz Czerny (1842-1916) as chair of surgery at the University of Heidelberg surgical clinic. He resigned this position in 1910 for health reasons, but continued to edit the Deutsche Zeitschrift fur Chirurgie and contribute articles to scientific publications during the ensuing years.

Narath made contributions in his studies involving the structure of bronchial systems, as well as in investigations of hernias. His name is lent to "Narath’s femoral hernia" (prevascular hernia), being described as a hernia behind the femoral vessels that is due to displacement of the psoas muscle in patients with congenital hip dislocation.

Narath was the author of papers on varicocele surgery, pneumatocele parotid, retroperitoneal lymph cysts and omentum-plasty, to name a few.
