= Marcin Kokoszka =

Polish footballer

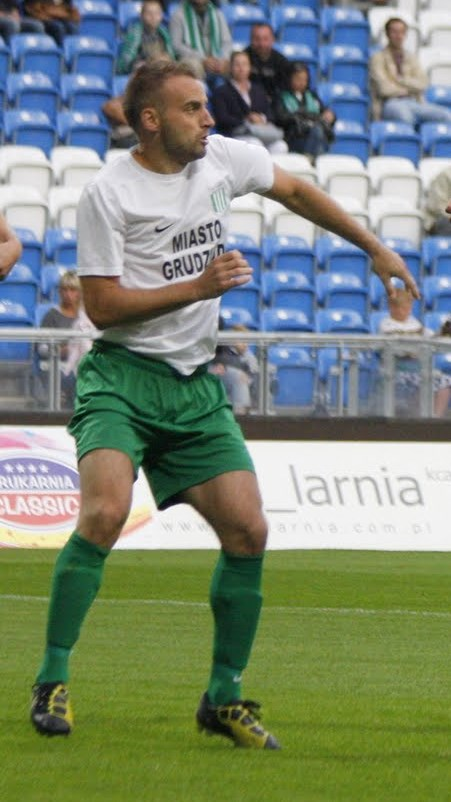

Personal information
- Full name: Marcin Kokoszka
- Date of birth: 23 February 1984 (age 42)
- Place of birth: Świebodzice, Poland
- Height: 1.80 m (5 ft 11 in)
- Position: Defender

Team information
- Current team: Granit Roztoka
- Number: 6

Senior career*
| Years | Team | Apps | (Gls) |
| 2002–2003 | Victoria Świebodzice | | |
| 2003–2004 | Tur Turek | | |
| 2004–2010 | Odra Wodzisław | 78 | (1) |
| 2005 | → Koszarawa Żywiec (loan) | | |
| 2011 | Górnik Polkowice | 15 | (0) |
| 2011–2013 | Olimpia Grudziądz | 25 | (0) |
| 2013–2016 | Victoria Świebodzice | | |
| 2016–2017 | SV Erlauf | 22 | (4) |
| 2017–2018 | AKS Strzegom | 33 | (2) |
| 2019 | Granit Roztoka | 2 | (0) |
| 2024– | Granit Roztoka | 1 | (0) |
- * Club domestic league appearances and goals as of 29 October 2024

Marcin Kokoszka (born 23 February 1984) is a Polish footballer who plays as a defender for Granit Roztoka.

== Career ==
In June 2011, he joined Olimpia Grudziądz.

== Honours ==
Victoria Świebodzice

- Regional league Wałbrzych: 2015–16
