= Hrušov Castle =

Historic site in Slovakia

- Hrušov hrad
- Nitra Region, Slovakia
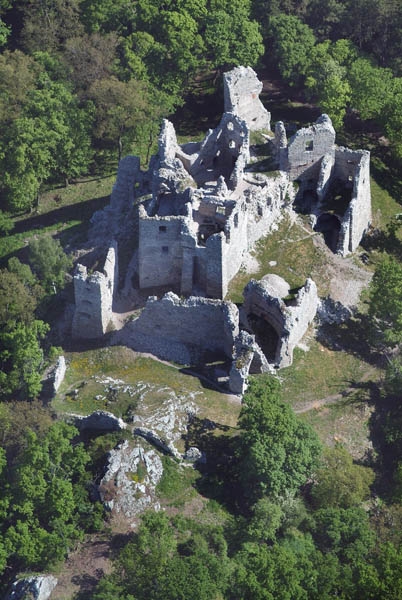
- Ariel view of Hrušov

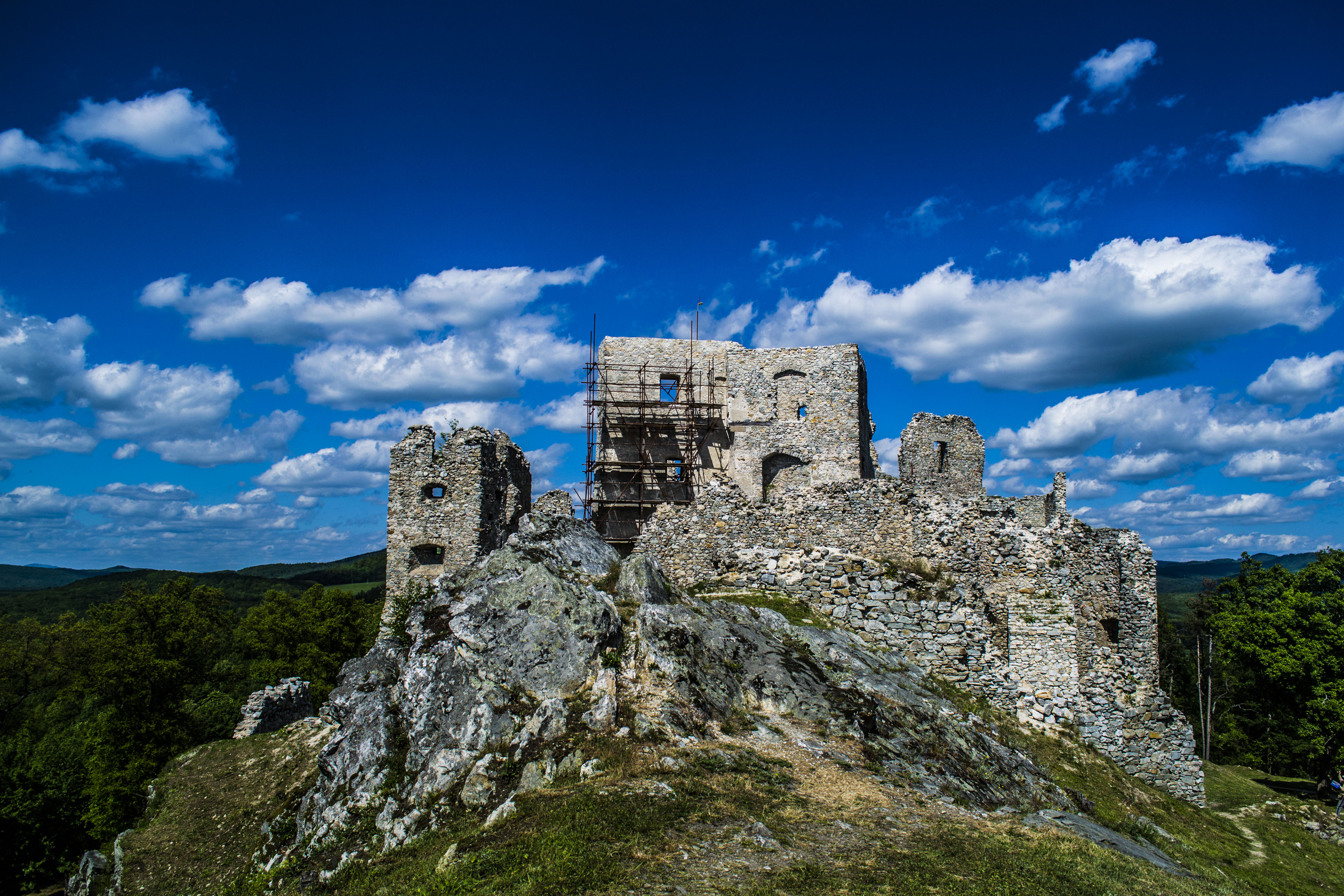
- View from the south

Site information
- Type: Castle

Location
- Coordinates: 48.478611°N 18.426111°E

Hrušov (Slovak: Hrušovský hrad; also referred to as Hrušov Castle) are the ruins of a Gothic castle located on the quartzite hill Skalka above the road from Topoľčianky to Skýcov, in the cadastral territory of the municipality of Hostie.

The origin of the castle is unclear, with the first mention of it being indirectly referenced in a forgery from around 1330. The first confirmed record of its castellan, Ladislav from the Pécs family, dates to 1316, and it is believed the castle was built by the Csák family to protect trade routes. Over the centuries, the castle changed ownership multiple times, including noble families like the Jolsvai, Bebek, Salcer, Tapolcsányi, and Rákóczi. It was expanded and fortified over time, especially during the 16th and 17th centuries. The castle played a significant role in regional conflicts, including wars against the Ottomans. It was captured and destroyed by imperial forces during the anti-Habsburg uprising in 1708

== History ==
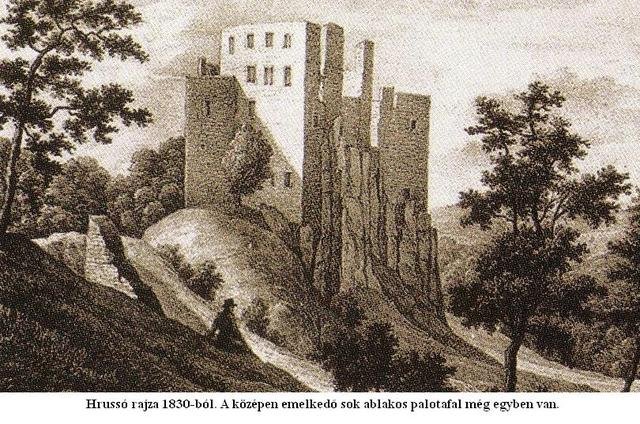
Hrušov in 1830

The origins of Hrušov Castle are not exactly known, but its construction is dated to the period after the departure of the Mongols. It was first mentioned in documents in 1253. The main function of the castle was to guard the trade route connecting Požitavie with Ponitrí. In the middle of the 14th century, the castle often changed owners. From 1321 to 1344, it belonged to the Lévai family, later it became royal property. In 1347, King Louis the Great donated Hrušov to the son of the county magistrate Gyula of Topoľčany, magister Miklós, and his blood brother András. In the deed of donation, the castle appears under the name "Castrum Nostrum Hurusov". Later, it became royal property again and was under the administration of castellans. At a time when several dynasties were fighting among themselves, around 1446, the castellan of Hrušov sold the castle to Koloman of Topoľčany. Until then, the castle was owned by the Bebek family. In 1616, the entire castle complex was sold to László Pethe. The sale of the castle was caused by the extinction of the family of the previous owners of the castle, the nobles from Topoľčianky. The end of the Hrušovský Castle was brought during the anti-Habsburg uprising, when the castle was conquered and destroyed in 1708.

== Conservation work ==
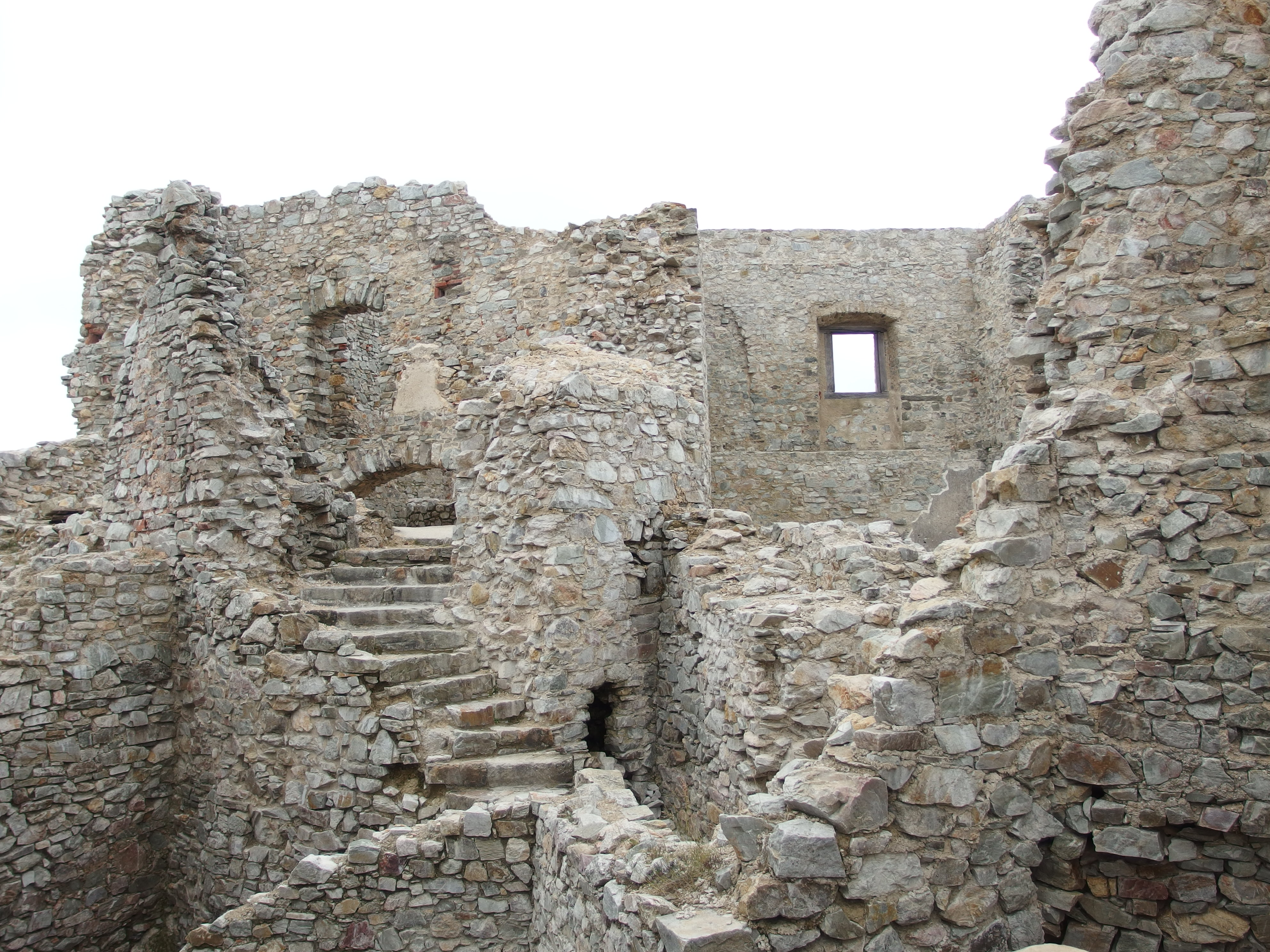
Within the castle

Between 1928 and 1930, one of the earliest modern conservation efforts at Hrušov was initiated by President of Czechoslovak Tomáš Masaryk, with work documented through archival records. In 2005, the Association for the Preservation of Medieval Architectural Heritage of the Nitra Region—Leustach—was founded to continue stabilization and conservation, starting volunteer activities in 2004.

Archaeological excavations started in 2010, focusing on various parts of the castle, with studies and research conducted by multiple experts from 2012 to 2022. These efforts uncovered structures dating from the 13th century and numerous artifacts, including ceramics, tools, weapons, and architectural elements. Restoration works over the years included conserving walls, restoring windows, reconstructing parts of the castle, and uncovering significant features like a 14th-century Gothic sedilia. The association also established exhibition spaces and an information center.

In 2023, further archaeological excavations and restoration took place, including work on the Renaissance palace, outer walls, drainage systems, and discoveries such as a wooden beam, a drawbridge pillar, and remnants of a portal.

== Description ==
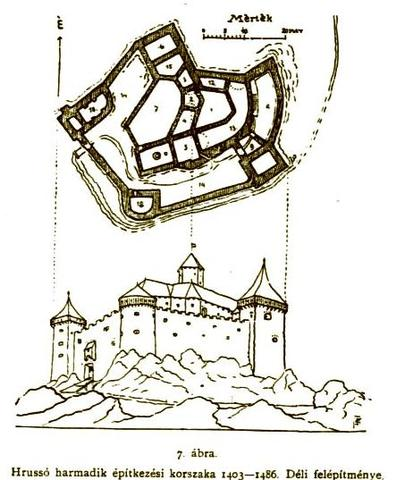
Castle plan

The castle complex had an oval shape and included an inner castle, first and second outer baileys. It was surrounded by a large defensive wall. Inside, there was a courtyard with a palace on the east and a smaller ground-level building with arrow slits on the opposite side. A defensive tower with rounded walls and a wedge-shaped end was attached to the southern side, containing remnants of a cistern. The first bailey with outer defenses adjoined the inner castle, while the second bailey extended along the south and east. Maintained by the civic association Leustach, the castle has undergone years of restoration and remains in good condition despite being a ruin.

== See also ==
- List of castles in Slovakia
