= Hrušov (Mladá Boleslav District) =

- Municipality
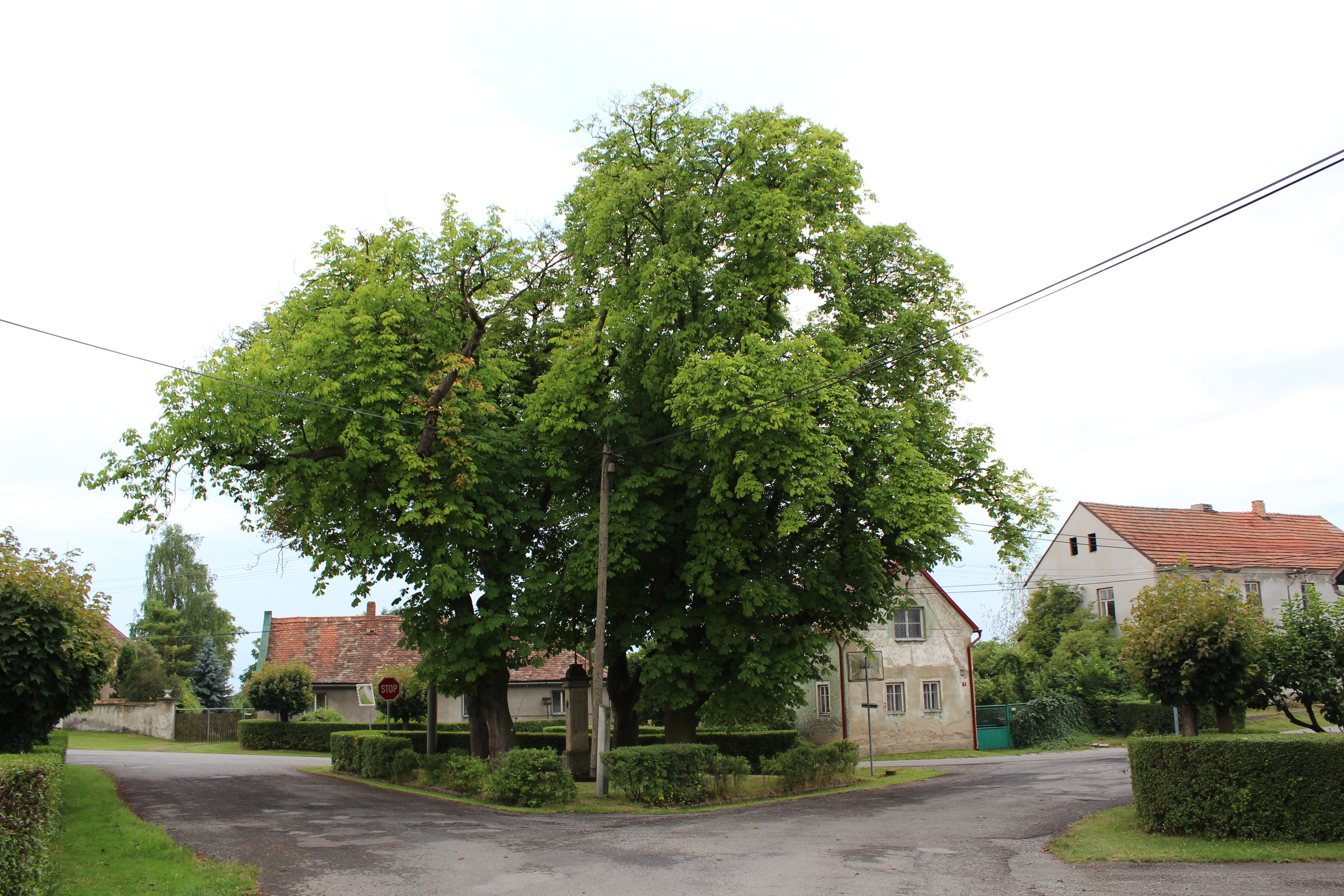
- Centre of Hrušov

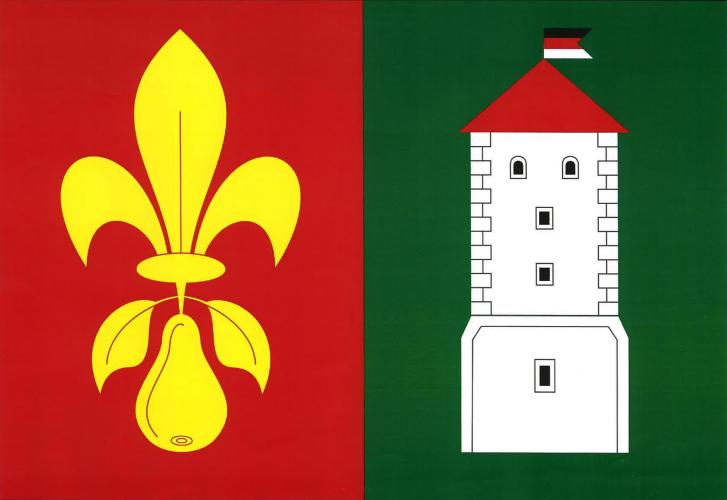
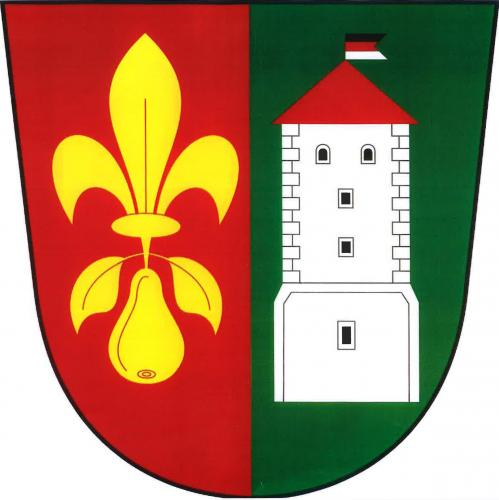
- Flag Coat of arms

- Location in the Czech Republic
- Coordinates: 50°20′42″N 14°50′47″E
- Country: Czech Republic
- Region: Central Bohemian
- District: Mladá Boleslav
- First mentioned: 1346

Area
  - Total: 4.94 km^{2} (1.91 sq mi)
- Elevation: 261 m (856 ft)

Population (2026-01-01)
  - Total: 223
  - Density: 45.1/km^{2} (117/sq mi)
- Time zone: UTC+1 (CET)
  - Summer (DST): UTC+2 (CEST)
- Postal code: 294 73
- Website: www.hrusov.cz

Hrušov is a municipality and village in Mladá Boleslav District in the Central Bohemian Region of the Czech Republic. It has about 200 inhabitants.

== Demographics ==
Historical population
Year	Pop.	±%
1869	356	—
1880	408	+14.6%
1890	434	+6.4%
1900	429	−1.2%
1910	410	−4.4%
1921	410	+0.0%
1930	371	−9.5%
1950	309	−16.7%
1961	297	−3.9%
1970	260	−12.5%
1980	228	−12.3%
1991	178	−21.9%
2001	168	−5.6%
2011	223	+32.7%
2021	227	+1.8%
Source: Censuses
