= Drago Perović =

Croatian physician (1888–1968)

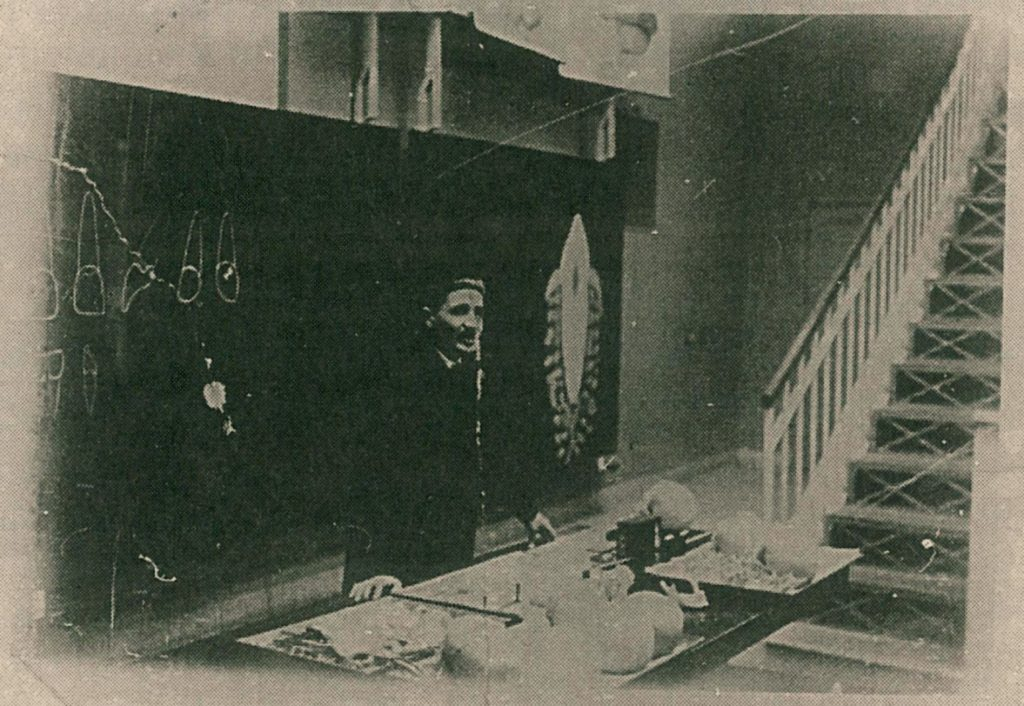
Perović at the inaugural lecture in 1918

Drago Perović (20 September 1888 – 6 January 1968) was a Serbian doctor who served as a professor of anatomy and as rector at the University of Zagreb. He established an influential school of osteology dealing particularly with the ear, nose and throat.

== Life and work ==
Perović was born in Gorica near Trebinje and went to school in Mostar where one of his teachers was the poet Jovan Dučić. His medical studies were at Vienna and in 1913 he became an assistant to Ferdinand Hochstetter. In 1914 he was invited to Belgrade as a professor but was unable to take it up due to the war. In 1917 he became chair of anatomy at the newly established faculty of medicine at the University of Zagreb, working there until his retirement. He established a large osteological collections and studied osteology, particularly the structures of the inner ear, nasal and paranasal sinuses. The anatomical institute that he established had more than 15,000 students passing through and he influenced a number of them including Jelena Krmpotić-Nemanić who succeeded his position. He was a contributor to the Croatian encyclopedia and was a rector of the University of Zagreb in 1925–26.
