= Hrušov, Veľký Krtíš District =

Hrušov Magasmajtény
- Municipality
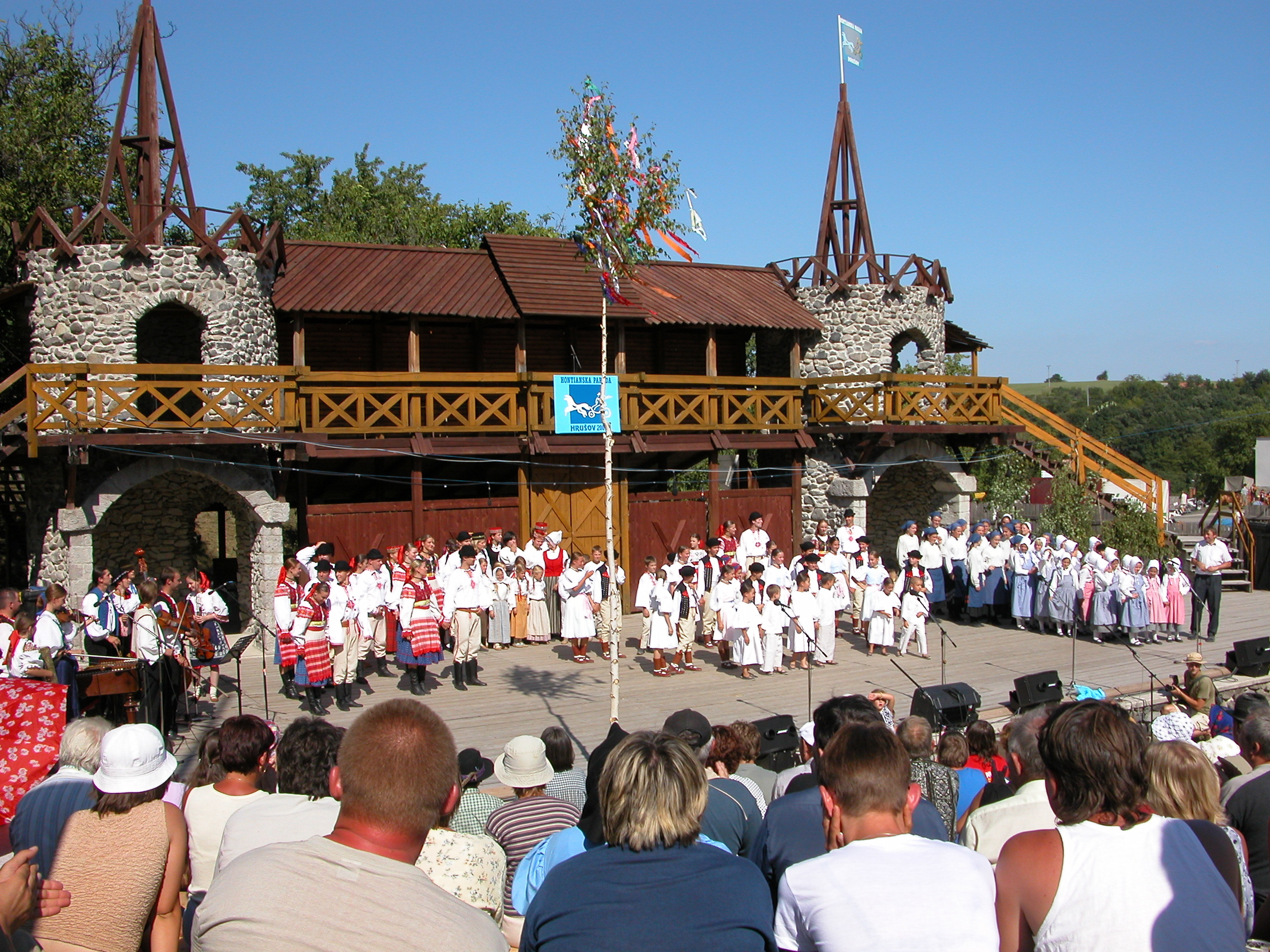

- Flag

- Location of Hrušov in the Banská Bystrica Region Location of Hrušov in Slovakia
- Coordinates: 48.17°N 19.13°E
- Country: Slovakia
- Region: Banská Bystrica Region
- District: Veľký Krtíš District
- First mentioned: 1285

Area
  - Total: 23.30 km^{2} (9.00 sq mi)
- Elevation: 349 m (1,145 ft)

Population (2025)
  - Total: 804
- Time zone: UTC+1 (CET)
  - Summer (DST): UTC+2 (CEST)
- Postal code: 991 42
- Area code: +421 47
- Vehicle registration plate (until 2022): VK
- Website: www.hrusov.sk

Hrušov (Hungarian: Magasmajtény) is a village and municipality in the Veľký Krtíš District of the Banská Bystrica Region of southern Slovakia. Hrušov is located in a historical region Hont.

== History ==
In historical records, the village was first mentioned in 1285 (1285 Huruso, 1312 Hurson, 1342 Hruso). It belonged to Bzovík castle and in the 19th century to Hussáry and, after, to Esztergom's ecclesiastical Capitol.

== Population ==
Population statistic (10 years)
Year	1995	2005	2015	2025
Count	941	905	859	804
Difference		−3.82%	−5.08%	−6.40%

Population statistic
Year	2024	2025
Count	812	804
Difference		−0.98%

It has a population of 804 people (31 December 2025).

=== Ethnicity ===
Census 2021 (1+ %)
Ethnicity	Number	Fraction
Slovak	776	94.17%
Not found out	38	4.61%
Total	824	

In year 2021 was 824 people by ethnicity 776 as Slovak, 38 as Not found out, 6 as Czech, 6 as Romani, 5 as Hungarian, 5 as Other, 2 as German, 1 as Rusyn and 1 as Polish.

Note on population: The difference values of population numbers in the table "Population statistic" and in the sections "Ethnicity" & "Religion" is caused by the use of various statistical methods.

=== Religion ===
Census 2021 (1+ %)
Religion	Number	Fraction
Roman Catholic Church	720	87.38%
None	41	4.98%
Not found out	37	4.49%
Total	824	

In year 2021 was 824 people by religion 720 from Roman Catholic Church, 41 from None, 37 from Not found out, 8 from Evangelical Church, 6 from Other, 4 from Ad hoc movements, 3 from Christian Congregations in Slovakia, 2 from Paganism and natural spirituality, 2 from Greek Catholic Church and 1 from Other and not ascertained christian church.

== Genealogical resources ==
The records for genealogical research are available at the state archive "Statny Archiv in Banska Bystrica, Slovakia"

- Roman Catholic church records (births/marriages/deaths): 1787-1894 (parish A)

== See also ==
- List of municipalities and towns in Slovakia
