= Hájek (surname) =

Hájek (feminine: Hájková) is a Czech surname, meaning 'little grove'. Anglicised and Germanised forms of the surname are Hajek and Hayek. Notable people with the surname include:

== Sports ==
- Andreas Hajek (born 1968), German rower
- Antonín Hájek (born 1987), Czech ski jumper
- Arnošt Hájek (born 1941), Czech biathlete
- Bohumil Hájek, Czech table tennis player
- Dave Hajek (born 1967), American baseball player
- David Hájek (born 1980), Czech ice hockey player
- František Hájek (1915–2001), Czech basketball player
- Jan Hájek (tennis) (born 1983), Czech tennis player
- Jiřina Hájková (born 1954), Czech field hockey player
- Kamila Hájková (born 1987), Czech ice dancer
- Karolína Hájková (born 1997), Slovak swimmer
- Libor Hájek (born 1998), Czech ice hockey player
- Markéta Hájková (born 2000), Czech cyclist
- Patrik Hájek (born 1998), Czech hammer thrower
- Rudolf Hajek (born 1963), Austrian para table tennis player
- Thomas Hajek (born 1978), Canadian lacrosse player
- Tomáš Hájek (born 1991), Czech footballer
- Zuzana Hájková (basketball) (born 1963), Czech basketball player

== Other ==
- Alena Hájková (1924–2012), Czech resistance fighter and historian
- Ann Hajek (born 1952), American entomologist
- Anna Hájková (born 1978), Czech historian
- Anne Hajek (born 1951), American politician
- Bruce Hajek (born 1955), American electrical engineer
- Dušan Hájek (born 1946), Slovak drummer and percussionist
- Emil Hájek (1886–1974), Czech pianist and composer
- Gwen Hajek (born 1966), American model
- Heinz Hajek-Halke (1898–1983) German photographer
- Jan Hajek (mathematician), Czech mathematician
- Jaroslav Hájek (1926–1974), Czech mathematician
- Jiří Hájek (1913–1993), Czech politician
- John Hajek (born 1962), Australian linguist
- Karel Hájek (1900–1978), Czech photographer
- Miloš Hájek (1921–2016), Czech academic and dissident
- Olaf Hajek (born 1965), German artist
- Otomar Hájek (1930–2016), Czech-American mathematician
- Peter Hajek (born 1945), British psychologist
- Petr Hájek (1940–2016), Czech mathematician
- Rainer Hajek (born 1945), German politician
- Tadeáš Hájek (1525–1600), Czech astronomer
- Václav Hájek, Latinised as Wenceslaus Hajek (died 1553), Czech historian

== See also ==
- Hájek (disambiguation)
