= Arthur J. Lohwater =

American mathematician (1922–1982)

- Born: October 20, 1922
- Died: June 10, 1982 (aged 59); Cleveland
- Education: University of Rochester
- Spouse: Marjorie White Lohwater
- Scientific career
- Fields: Mathematics
- Workplaces: University of Rochester; University of Michigan; Case Western Reserve University
- Thesis: The Boundary Values Of A Class Of Analytic Functions (1951)
- Doctoral advisor: Wladimir Seidel

Arthur John "Jack" Lohwater (October 20, 1922 - June 10, 1982) was an American mathematician.

He obtained a Ph.D. in mathematics at University of Rochester (1951), on the dissertation The Boundary Values of a Class of Analytic Functions, advised by Wladimir Seidel. Later he joined the faculty at University of Michigan and Case Western Reserve University. He was editor of Mathematical Reviews (1962–65). With Norman Steenrod and Sydney Gould he established important ties with Russian mathematicians, beginning with conferences in Moscow (1956, 58) and resulting in a dictionary. Lohwater died of lung cancer in 1982, after a lengthy illness. He was married to the mathematician Marjorie White Lohwater (1925–2007).

== Books ==
- Русско-английский словарь математических терминов. (Russian-English Dictionary of the Mathematical Sciences) (American Mathematical Society, 1961). The inverse was published by Soviet Academy of Sciences (1961).
- The theory of cluster sets (Cambridge University Press, 1966). With Edward Collingwood.
- Global Differentiable Dynamics, Proceedings of the Conference Held at Case Western Reserve University, Cleveland, Ohio, June 2–6, 1969. With Otomar Hájek and Roger C. McCann (editors)

=== Translations ===
- Ladyzhenskaya, O. A.; John (1985). The Boundary Value Problems of Mathematical Physics. Applied Mathematical Sciences. Vol. 49. New York, NY: Springer New York. doi:10.1007/978-1-4757-4317-3. ISBN 978-1-4419-2824-5.

== Publications ==
- Lohwater, A.J.; Seidel, W. (1948). "An example in conformal mapping". Duke Mathematical Journal. 15 (1). Duke University Press: 137–143. doi:10.1215/s0012-7094-48-01516-6.
- Lohwater, A.J. (1952). "The boundary values of a class of meromorphic functions". Duke Mathematical Journal. 19 (2). Duke University Press: 243–252. doi:10.1215/s0012-7094-52-01925-x.
- Lohwater, A.J. (1953). "On the Schwarz reflection principle". The Michigan Mathematical Journal. 2 (2). The University of Michigan: 151–156. doi:10.1307/mmj/1028989920.
- Gehring, FW; Lohwater, A.J. (1958). "On the Lindelӧf theorem". Mathematische Nachrichten. 19 (1–6). Wiley Online Library: 165–170. doi:10.1002/mana.19580190111.
- Lohwater, A.J.; Piranian, G.; Rudin, W (1955). "The derivative of a Schlicht function". Math. Scand. 3: 103–106. doi:10.7146/math.scand.a-10430.
- Mathematics in the Soviet Union, in Science 17 May 1957: 974-978
- Lohwater, A.J.; Piranian, G. (1957). The boundary behaviour of functions analytic in a disk. Annales Academiæ Scientiarum Fennicæ: Mathematica. Helsinki: Suomalainen tiedeakatemia.
- Lohwater, A.J.; Bruckner, A.M.; Ryan, F. (1969). "Some non-negativity theorems for harmonic functions". Annales Academiae Scientiarum Fennicae. A 1. Suomalainen Tiedeakatemia.
- The boundary behaviour of analytic functions, in Itogi Nauki i Techniki, Mat. Anal., 10:99-259, 1973
- Lohwater, A.J.; Pommerenke, C. (1973). On normal meromorphic functions. Annales Academiae Scientiarum Fennicae: 1 : Mathematica. Suomalainen Tiedeakatemia. ISBN 9789514101250.
- "Introduction to Inequalities", 1982 (unpublished, reproduced with permission of Marjorie Lohwater) used in the "Introduction to Inequalities" course taught by Lohwater.

== Awards ==
- Guggenheim fellowship 1955 (mathematics)
