= Hagecius =

Hagecius may refer to:

- Hagecius (crater), a lunar impact crater
- Tadeáš Hájek, Latinized as Thaddaeus Hagecius (1525–1600), Czech astronomer
- Wenceslaus Hajek, also known as Wenceslaus Hagecius (died 1553), Czech historian

== See also ==
- Hájek (surname)
