= Hájek =

Hájek may refer to:

== Places in the Czech Republic ==
- Hájek (Karlovy Vary District), a municipality and village in the Karlovy Vary Region
- Hájek (Strakonice District), a municipality and village in the South Bohemian Region
- Hájek, a village and part of Tišnov in the South Moravian Region
- Hájek, a village and part of Úmonín in the Central Bohemian Region
- Hájek, a village and part of Vodice (Tábor District) in the South Bohemian Region
- Hájek, a village and part of Všeruby (Domažlice District) in the Plzeň Region

== Other ==
- Hájek (surname), a Czech-language surname
- 1995 Hajek, an asteroid

== See also ==
- Hájek–Le Cam convolution theorem
- Hayek
