= Asclepi (crater) =

Crater on the Moon

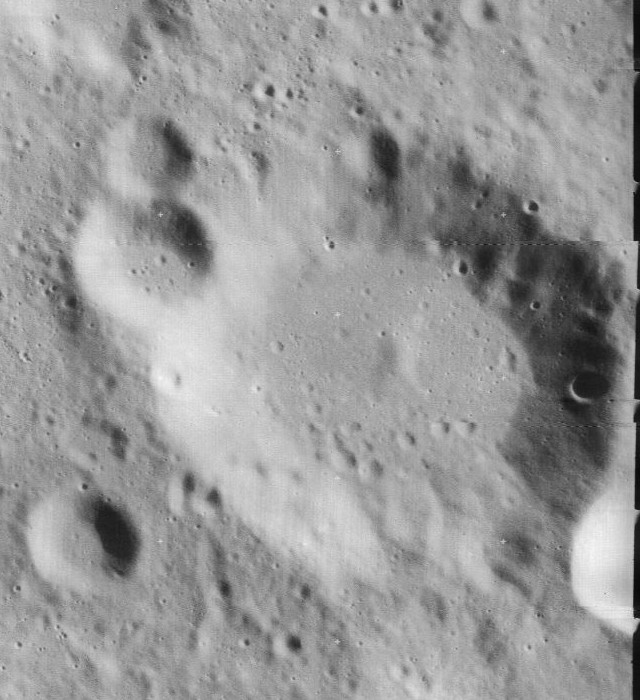
- Lunar Orbiter 4 image
- Coordinates: 55.1°S 25.4°E
- Diameter: 40.56 km (25.20 mi)
- Depth: 2.9 km (1.8 mi)
- Colongitude: 335° at sunrise
- Formation: Pre-Nectarian
- Eponym: Giuseppe Asclepi

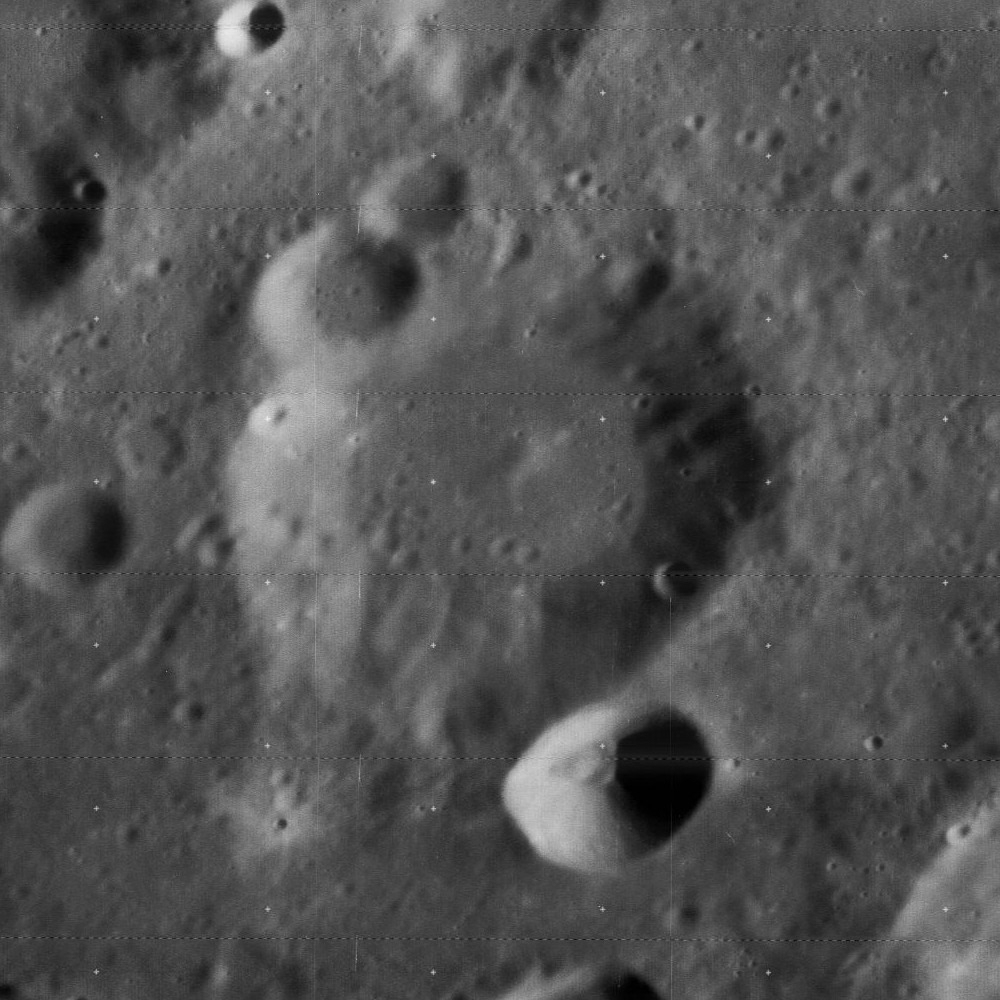
Slightly oblique Lunar Orbiter 4 image

Asclepi is a degraded lunar impact crater that lies in the rugged southern highlands of the Moon. This is a bowl-shaped formation with a nearly level central floor. Nearby craters of note include Pitiscus to the north-northeast, Hommel due east, and Baco to the northwest. To the west-southwest is the smaller crater Tannerus.

On the lunar geologic timescale, Asclepi dates from the Pre-Nectarian period. The outer rim has been worn down and rounded by many millions of years of subsequent impacts, so that it is now nearly level with the surrounding terrain. As a result, the crater is now little more than a depression in the surface. There is a small crater across the western rim, and several tiny craterlets. The satellite crater Hommel K is a more recent impact that is attached to the southeast rim. The interior is nearly flat and relatively featureless, with a small central rise and some craterlets in the southern half.

This crater is named after Italian astronomer Giuseppe Asclepi (1706-1776). Its designation was officially adopted by the International Astronomical Union in 1935. The name was introduced into lunar nomenclature by German selenographer Julius Schmidt in 1878.

== Satellite craters ==
By convention these features are identified on lunar maps by placing the letter on the side of the crater midpoint that is closest to Asclepi.

Asclepi	Latitude	Longitude	Diameter
A	52.9° S	23.0° E	14 km
B	54.1° S	23.9° E	19 km
C	53.3° S	23.4° E	11 km
D	53.5° S	24.1° E	18 km
E	52.1° S	24.1° E	7 km
G	53.3° S	24.8° E	5 km
H	52.7° S	25.1° E	19 km
