= Adam Tanner =

Adam Tanner may refer to:

- Adam Tanner (footballer) (born 1973), English footballer
- Adam Tanner (theologian) (1571-1632), Austrian Jesuit
