= Hayek =

Hayek is a surname:

- It is a variant spelling of the Czech surname Hájek, meaning 'small grove'. It also occurs among Polish Jews in a Polish language spelling as Chajek.
- The family name Hayek, Hayeck, Haiek or Haick (Levantine Arabic: حايك, from Classical Arabic: حائك) is a Lebanese Christian last name, meaning 'tailor', and can be found in other parts of the Levant.

Notable people with the surname include:

== European surname ==
- Gustav von Hayek (1836–1911), Czech-born Austrian naturalist, father of botanist August von Hayek
  - August von Hayek (1871–1928), Austrian botanist, father of economist Friedrich Hayek
    - Friedrich Hayek (1899–1992), Austrian-British economist and political philosopher, Nobel Memorial Prize winner
    - Heinrich von Hayek (1900–1969), Austrian anatomist
- Frank Forest (born Frank Hayek, 1896–1976), American singer and actor
- Julie Hayek (born 1960), American beauty queen and actress
- Peter Hayek (born 1957), American ice hockey player
- Tadeáš Hájek (Latinized Thaddaeus Hagecius ab Hayek, 1525–1600), Czech naturalist and astronomer

== Levantine surname ==
- Antoine Hayek (1928–2010), Roman Catholic Archbishop of Baniyas of the Melkite Greek Catholic Church 1989–2006
- Dina Hayek (born Collet Bou Gergis, 1982), popular Lebanese singer
- Ignace Antoine II Hayek (Antun Hayek, 1910–2007), Patriarch of Antioch of the Syriac Catholic Church 1968–1998
- Nicolas Hayek (1928–2010), Lebanese-Swiss co-founder of the Swatch Group
- Renée Hayek, Lebanese writer and novelist
- Rita Hayek (born 1987), Lebanese actress
- Salma Hayek (born 1966), Mexican actress of Lebanese descent
- Samuel Hayek (born 1953), Israeli real-estate businessman of Iraqi-Jewish descent
- Hossam Haick (born 1975), Israeli-Arab scientist and engineer

== See also ==
- Hájek (disambiguation)
- Haik (disambiguation)
