= Otomar =

Otomar is a Czech and Slovak masculine given name. Notable people with the name include:

- Otomar Hájek (1930–2016), Czech-American mathematician
- Otomar Korbelář (1899–1976), Czech actor
- Otomar Krejča (1921–2009), Czech theatre director and anti-Communist dissident
- Otomar Kubala (1906–1946), Slovak fascist
- Otomar Kvěch (1950–2018), Czech composer
