= Jan Hajek =

Jan Hajek or Jan Hájek may refer to:

- Jan Hajek (scientist)
- Jan Hájek (tennis)
