= Erik Angner =

Swedish economist

- Education: University of Pittsburgh Uppsala University
- Scientific career
- Fields: Behavioral economics; Philosophy of Science; Political Philosophy
- Workplaces: Stockholm University George Mason University University of Alabama at Birmingham
- Website: erikangner.com

Erik Angner is a Swedish-American author and Professor of Practical Philosophy at Stockholm University. Angner is a moral philosopher whose research and teaching grapple with the classical philosophical question "How should people live?" by exploring issues of well-being, rationality, and social order. His work is thoroughly interdisciplinary, bridging philosophy and economic fields and studying rationality and well-being, particularly in the context of decision theory, behavioral decision research and the relationships between happiness, poverty, and health with ways to quantify happiness.

== Education and academic career ==
Angner attended Uppsala University where he received his bachelor's degree in philosophy and mathematics followed by his masters in theoretical philosophy. He then completed two PhDs at the University of Pittsburgh, one in Economics and the other in History and Philosophy of Science.

He taught at the University of Alabama at Birmingham where he was also enlisted as an investigator for the Center for Education and Research on Therapeutics; Associate Scientist for the Minority Health and Research Center; Scientist for the Center for Outcomes and Effectiveness Research and Education; Co-director for the Regulatory & Research Ethics Component; Director of Interdisciplinary Philosophy and Political Economy;

Angner moved to George Mason University in 2012 where, in addition to being associate professor of philosophy, he worked with the Department of Economics as well as the School of Policy, Government, and International Affairs, before serving as the Director of the Philosophy, Politics, and Economics Program.

In 2016, he joined Stockholm University as Professor of Practical Philosophy and Director of their Philosophy, Politics, and Economics Program as well as researcher for the Institute for Future Studies and TINT Centre of Philosophy and Social Science for the University of Helsinki.

== Books ==
Angner has written a number of papers and book chapters published in journals of philosophy, economics, psychology, medicine, and history of science and is the author of Hayek and Natural Law which seeks to paint Hayek's work as a continuation of the Natural Law tradition. His other book, A Course in Behavioral Economics was hailed as one of the first behavioral economics textbooks and has been translated in multiple languages. In 2023, Angner's book, How Economics Can Save the World: Simple Ideas to Solve Our Biggest Problems, was published by Penguin Press.
