= Anna Hájková =

Czech-British historian

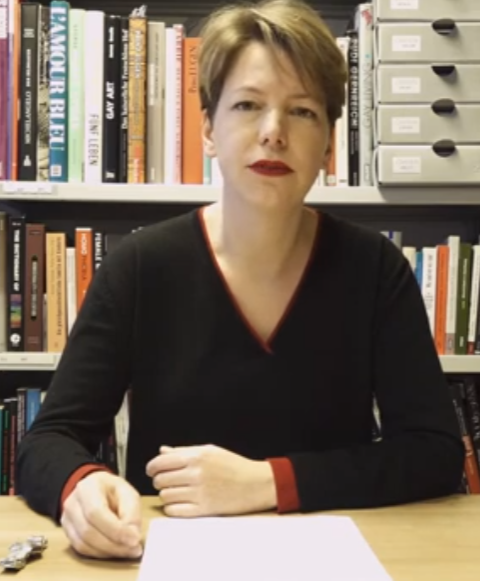
- Giving a video lecture in 2021
- Born: 1978 (age 47–48)
- Education: Humboldt University Berlin; University of Amsterdam; University of Toronto
- Occupation: Historian

Anna Hájková (born 1978) is a Czech-British historian who is currently a faculty member at the University of Warwick. She specializes in the study of everyday life during the Holocaust and sexuality and the Holocaust. According to Hájková, "My approach to queer Holocaust history shows a more complex, more human, and more real society beyond monsters and saints."

== Family ==
Hájková is the granddaughter of Czech historian Miloš Hájek (1921–2016) and his first wife, Alena Hájková (1924–2012), a historian who specialized in studying Czech Jewish resistance to Nazism. Both were recognized as Righteous Among the Nations, and Miloš was a Charter 77 signatory and spokesperson. She is Jewish.

== Career ==
From 1998 to 2006, Hájková studied modern history at the Humboldt University Berlin and the University of Amsterdam. She obtained a master's degree under the supervision of Hartmut Kaelble with a thesis titled Die Juden aus den Niederlanden im Ghetto Theresienstadt, 1943-1945 (The Jews from the Netherlands in Theresienstadt Ghetto, 1943–1945). She received her PhD from the University of Toronto in 2013. Her thesis, supervised by Doris Bergen, was titled, Prisoner Society in the Terezin Ghetto, 1941-1945, regarding the prisoner society in Theresienstadt Ghetto. Her dissertation received the awards Irma-Rosenberg-Preis and Herbert-Steiner-Preis. In 2013, she published the paper "Sexual Barter in Times of Genocide: Negotiating the Sexual Economy of the Theresienstadt Ghetto", which received the Catharine Stimpson Prize for Outstanding Feminist Scholarship. According to Michal Frankl, this study uses "a new and inspiring methodological approach". Since 2013, she has been a professor at the University of Warwick.

In 2020, her book The Last Ghetto: An Everyday History of Theresienstadt was published by Oxford University Press, which Frankl described as an "important book project". The same year, she edited an issue of German History titled "Sexuality, Holocaust, Stigma". She is the chairwoman of the academic advisory board of Společnost pro queer paměť ("Society for Queer Memory"), a Czech society which collects information about LGBT history. Hájková has also published articles about historical topics in newspapers and magazines such as Haaretz, Tablet Magazine, and History Today.

== Personal rights case ==
In April 2020, a German court found that Hájková had violated the personal rights of a deceased Holocaust survivor by concluding from witness testimonies that it was not unlikely the then camp inmate had entertained a relationship with SS guard Anneliese Kohlmann. Whilst Anneliese Kohlmann explicitly stated in her post-war trial she had fallen in love with this particular inmate, recent legal investigations arise from the remaining uncertainties regarding the extent to which the camp inmate might or might not have responded to Kohlmann's affection.

== Works ==
- Hájková, Anna (2013). "Sexual Barter in Times of Genocide: Negotiating the Sexual Economy of the Theresienstadt Ghetto". Signs. 38 (3): 503–533. doi:10.1086/668607. S2CID 142859604.
- Hájková, Anna (2013). Prisoner Society in the Terezin Ghetto, 1941-1945 (PhD thesis). University of Toronto.
- Löw, Andrea; Bergen, Doris L.; Hájková, Anna, eds. (2014). Alltag im Holocaust: Jüdisches Leben im Großdeutschen Reich 1941–1945 [Everyday Life during the Holocaust: Jewish Lives in the Greater German Reich, 1941–1945] (in German). Walter de Gruyter GmbH. ISBN 978-3-486-73567-3.
- Lebovič, Eugen; Hájková, Pavla (2018). Hájková, Anna (ed.). Čekám, až se vrátíš: rodinné deníky z války [I am Waiting For You to Come Back: Wartime Family Diaries] (in Czech). NLN. ISBN 978-80-7422-655-7.
- Hájková, Anna; Heydt, Maria von der (2019). Die letzten Berliner Veit Simons: Holocaust, Geschlecht und das Ende des deutsch-jüdischen Bürgertums [The Last Veit Simons from Berlin. Holocaust, Gender, and the End of the German-Jewish Bourgeoisie] (in German). Hentrich und Hentrich Verlag Berlin. ISBN 978-3-95565-301-9.
- Hájková, Anna (2020). The Last Ghetto: An Everyday History of Theresienstadt. Oxford University Press. ISBN 978-0-19-005177-8.
- Hájková, Anna (2021). Menschen ohne Geschichte sind Staub: Homophobie und Holocaust. Wallstein Verlag. ISBN 978-3-8353-3769-5.
