= Rosenberger (crater) =

Crater on the Moon

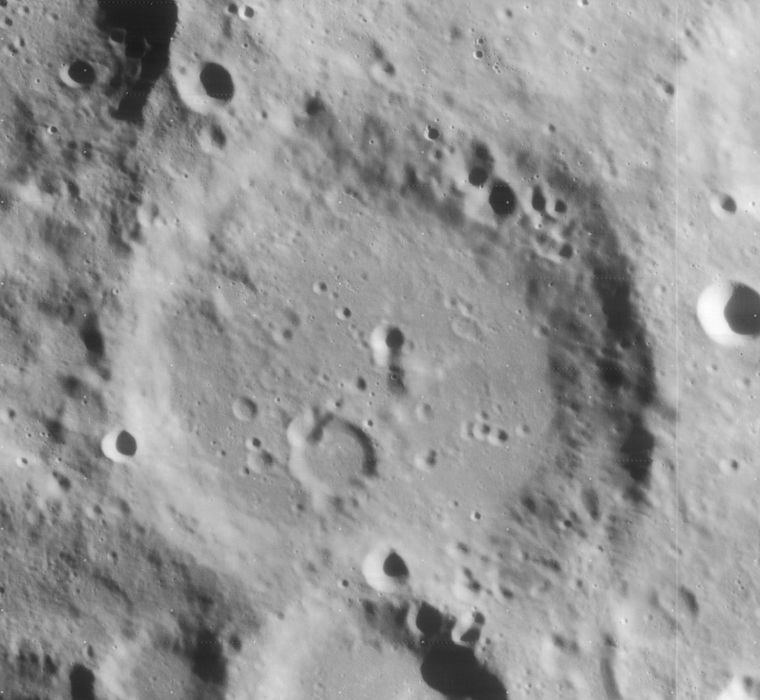
- Lunar Orbiter 4 image
- Coordinates: 55.4°S 43.1°E
- Diameter: 96 km
- Depth: 2.2 km
- Colongitude: 318° at sunrise
- Eponym: Otto A. Rosenberger

Rosenberger is an old lunar impact crater in the southeastern part of the Moon. It was named after German astronomer Otto August Rosenberger.

This crater is located in a region rich with prominent craters. The slightly smaller Vlacq is nearly attached to the northwestern outer rim of Rosenberger. Other nearby craters of note include Biela to the east, Hagecius to the south-southeast, and Nearch to the south-southwest. Due west past Vlacq is Hommel.

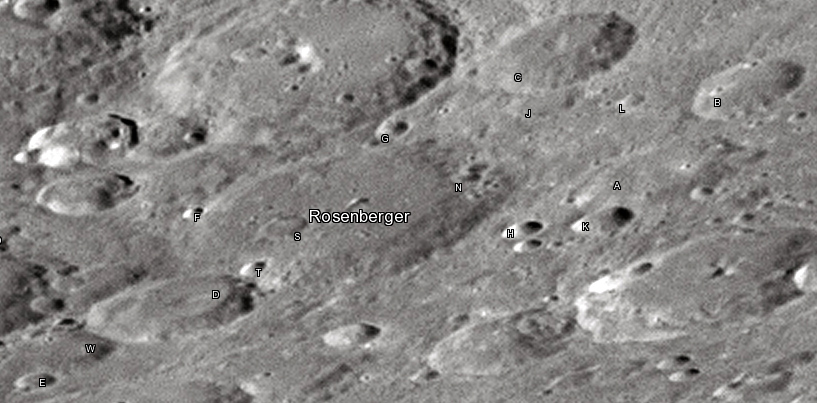
Rosenberger crater and its satellite craters taken from Earth in 2012 at the University of Hertfordshire's Bayfordbury Observatory with the telescopes Meade LX200 14" and Lumenera Skynyx 2-1

On the lunar geologic timescale, this crater dates to the Pre-Nectarian epoch. It has been heavily eroded by a history of impacts, so that the outer rim has become rounded and somewhat indistinct. As a result, the crater possesses only a shallow rise along the rim edge, and it nearly forms a circular depression in the surface. The satellite crater Rosenberger D, which is about 50 kilometers in diameter, intrudes into the southern rim of Rosenberger. A number of smaller, worn impact craters lie along the rest of the rim and inner wall.

The interior floor of this crater forms a relatively level surface that is marked by several small craterlets. To the south-southeast of the midpoint is the worn remains of a small crater. At the midpoint there is a low central peak joined to a small craterlet to the north.

== Satellite craters ==
By convention, these features are shown on lunar maps by placing the letter on the side of the crater midpoint that is closest to Rosenberger.

Rosenberger	Latitude	Longitude	Diameter
A	53.5° S	47.0° E	49 km
B	51.7° S	46.1° E	33 km
C	52.1° S	42.1° E	47 km
D	57.5° S	42.9° E	50 km
E	59.3° S	43.2° E	11 km
F	56.0° S	40.6° E	6 km
G	53.9° S	41.4° E	9 km
H	55.0° S	46.5° E	12 km
J	52.9° S	43.3° E	22 km
K	54.5° S	47.7° E	18 km
L	52.6° S	44.6° E	9 km
N	54.3° S	44.1° E	8 km
S	55.8° S	42.6° E	14 km
T	56.5° S	43.1° E	8 km
W	58.7° S	42.4° E	32 km
