= Wladimir Seidel =

German-American mathematician

- Born: December 21, 1907; Odessa, Russian Empire
- Died: January 12, 1981 (aged 73); Detroit, Michigan
- Education: Ludwig-Maximilians-Universität München
- Known for: Seidel class
- Scientific career
- Thesis: Über die Ränderzuordnung bei konformen Abbildungen (1930)
- Doctoral advisor: Constantin Carathéodory

Wladimir P. Seidel (21 December 1907 – 12 January 1981) was a Russian-born German-American mathematician and Doctor of Mathematics. He held a fellowship as a Benjamin Peirce Professor in Harvard University. During World War II, he was with the Montreal Theory group for the National Research Council of Canada.

== Life ==
He was born in Odessa, Russian Empire on 21 December 1907.

== Career ==
He obtained his Ph.D. from the Ludwig-Maximilians-Universität München on 26 February 1930 with a dissertation entitled Über die Ränderzuordnung bei konformen Abbildungen, advised by Constantin Carathéodory.

He joined the faculty of Mathematics at Harvard University as Benjamin Peirce Instructor from 1932 to 1933, at University of Rochester from 1941 to 1955, at The Institute for Advanced Study in Princeton from 1952 to 1953, at University of Notre Dame from 1955 to 1963, and at Wayne State University in Detroit since 1963.

During World War II, he was with the Montreal Theory group for the National Research Council of Canada.

The Seidel class is named after him.

He was married to Leah Lappin-Seidel (1904–1999).

== Publications ==
- Wladimir Seidel (1933). "Note on a Metrically Transitive System". Proceedings of the National Academy of Sciences. 19 (4): 453–456. Bibcode:1933PNAS...19..453S. doi:10.1073/pnas.19.4.453. PMC 1086021. PMID 16577539.
- Wladimir Seidel (1935). "On a Metric Property of Fuchsian Groups". Proceedings of the National Academy of Sciences. 21 (7): 475–478. Bibcode:1935PNAS...21..475S. doi:10.1073/pnas.21.7.475. PMC 1076630. PMID 16588004.
- Wladimir Seidel; Arthur J. Lohwater (1948). "An example in conformal mapping". Duke Mathematical Journal. 15 (1): 137–143. doi:10.1215/s0012-7094-48-01516-6. MR 0023903.
- Franz Schnitzer; Wladimir Seidel (1965). "On the modulus of unbounded holomorphic functions". Mathematische Zeitschrift. 88 (4): 301–308. doi:10.1007/BF01111814. S2CID 120723458.
- F. Bagemihl; W. Seidel (1962). "Koebe arcs and Fatou points of normal functions". Commentarii Mathematici Helvetici. 36 (1): 9–18. doi:10.1007/BF02566888. S2CID 121094714.
- W. Seidel (1962). "Book Review: Cluster sets". Bulletin of the American Mathematical Society. 68 (6): 551–553. doi:10.1090/S0002-9904-1962-10837-4.
- W. Seidel (1962). "Review: Kiyoshi Noshiro, Cluster sets". Bulletin of the American Mathematical Society. 68 (1962): 551–552. doi:10.1090/s0002-9904-1962-10837-4.
- F. Bagemihl; W. Seidel (1960). "Behavior of meromorphic functions on boundary paths, with applications to normal functions". Archiv der Mathematik. 11 (1): 263–269. doi:10.1007/BF01236942. S2CID 120462472.
- W. Seidel (1959). "Holomorphic functions with spiral asymptotic paths". Nagoya Mathematical Journal. 14 (1959): 159–171. doi:10.1017/S0027763000005821.
- F. Bagemihl; W. Seidel (1956). "Functions of bounded characteristic with prescribed ambiguous points". Michigan Mathematical Journal. 3 (1955): 77–81. doi:10.1307/mmj/1031710538.
- F. Bagemihl; W. Seidel (1955). "A problem concerning cluster sets of analytic functions". Mathematische Zeitschrift. 62 (1): 99–110. doi:10.1007/BF01180626. S2CID 122574500.
- F. Bagemihl; W. Seidel (1955). "Some remarks on boundary behavior of analytic and meromorphic functions". Nagoya Mathematical Journal. 9 (1955): 79–85. doi:10.1017/S0027763000023308.
- F. Bagemihl; W. Seidel (1954). "Some boundary properties of analytic functions". Mathematische Zeitschrift. 61 (1): 186–199. doi:10.1007/BF01181342. S2CID 120627257.
- F. Bagemihl; W. Seidel (1953). "A General Principle Involving Baire Category, with Applications to Function Theory and Other Fields". Proceedings of the National Academy of Sciences. 39 (10): 1068–1075. Bibcode:1953PNAS...39.1068B. doi:10.1073/pnas.39.10.1068. PMC 1063907. PMID 16589375.
- W. Seidel (1953). "Note on a persymmetric determinant". Quarterly Journal of Mathematics. 4 (1): 150–151. Bibcode:1953QJMat...4..150S. doi:10.1093/qmath/4.1.150.
- Seidel, W. (1931). "Über die Ränderzuordnung bei konformen Abbildungen". Mathematische Annalen. 104 (1). Springer: 182–243. doi:10.1007/bf01457932. S2CID 119959703.
