= Tannerus (crater) =

Crater on the Moon

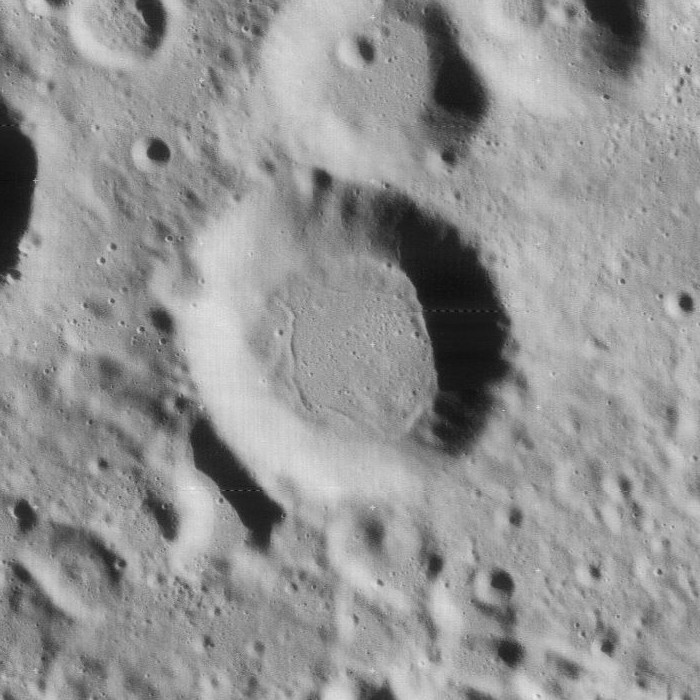
- Lunar Orbiter 4 image
- Coordinates: 54.6°S 22.0°E
- Diameter: 29 km
- Depth: 1.8 km
- Colongitude: 339° at sunrise
- Eponym: Adam Tanner

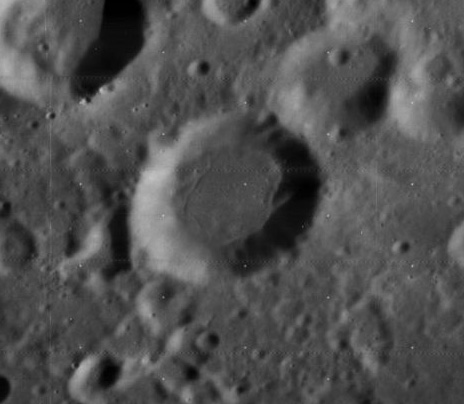
Another Lunar Orbiter 4 image

Tannerus is a small lunar impact crater that is located in the rugged southern highlands of the Moon. It lies within a couple of crater diameters of Asclepi to the northeast, and some distance due east of Jacobi.

The rim of this crater is very close to circular, with only a slight inward bulge along the north edge where it is joined to Tannerus P. The edge is sharp and well-defined, although there are tiny impacts along the rim in the west and south. The crater floor is level and free of markings or features of note.

== Satellite craters ==
By convention these features are identified on lunar maps by placing the letter on the side of the crater midpoint that is closest to Tannerus.

Tannerus	Latitude	Longitude	Diameter
A	57.5° S	18.2° E	5 km
B	57.5° S	19.7° E	14 km
C	55.3° S	22.7° E	16 km
D	55.8° S	18.0° E	32 km
E	56.1° S	19.6° E	26 km
F	55.0° S	22.1° E	36 km
G	55.1° S	16.2° E	22 km
H	54.2° S	22.7° E	20 km
J	57.2° S	24.6° E	12 km
K	55.5° S	20.7° E	8 km
L	57.5° S	22.3° E	7 km
M	54.9° S	20.9° E	6 km
N	55.9° S	24.1° E	10 km
P	55.6° S	21.9° E	20 km
