= Hagecius (crater) =

Crater on the Moon

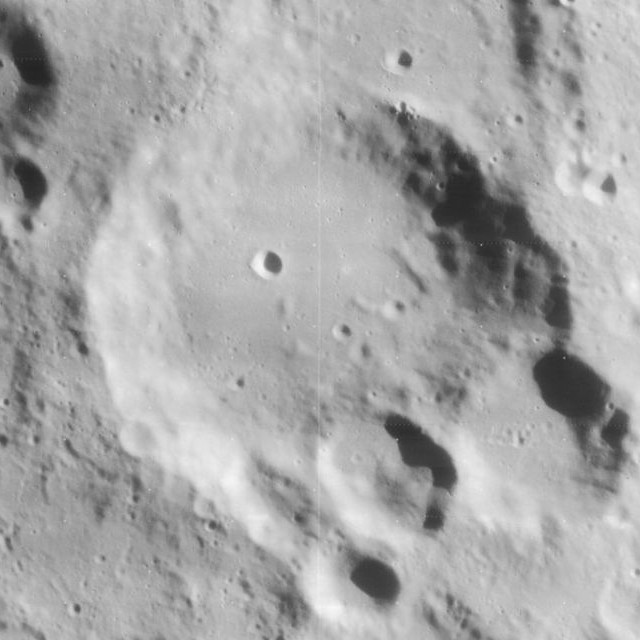
- Lunar Orbiter 4 image
- Coordinates: 59.8°S 46.6°E
- Diameter: 80 km
- Colongitude: 316° at sunrise
- Eponym: Tadeáš Hájek

Hagecius is a lunar impact crater in the southeastern part of the Moon's near side. It was named after 16th century Czech naturalist Tadeáš Hájek (Latinized as Thaddaeus Hagecius). This crater forms a triangular formation with the craters Rosenberger to the north-northwest and Nearch to the west-northwest. Like both of these craters, Hagecius has undergone erosion from subsequent impacts, and its outer rim is worn and irregular. The southeastern rim in particular is overlaid by three smaller craters designated Hagecius C, B, and G.

The interior floor of Hagecius is a level plain with no significant rises. There is a small craterlet to the northwest of the midpoint, and a few tiny craterlets marking the southeastern half of the floor. About a third of the interior floor on this side is also overlaid by the outer ramparts of the three satellite craters mentioned above.

To the northeast of Hagecius is the crater Biela, a younger formation.

== Satellite craters ==
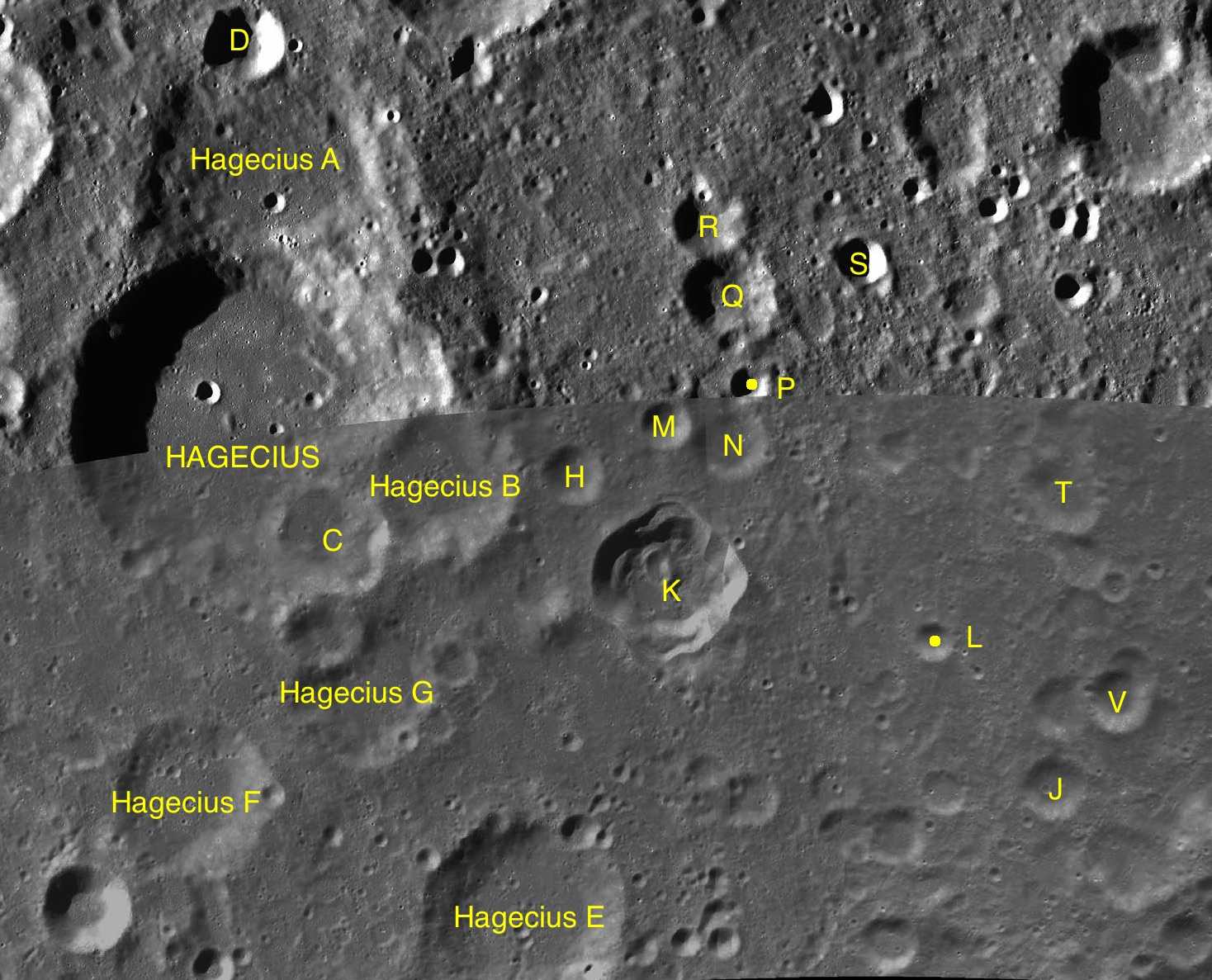
Hagecius and its satellite craters

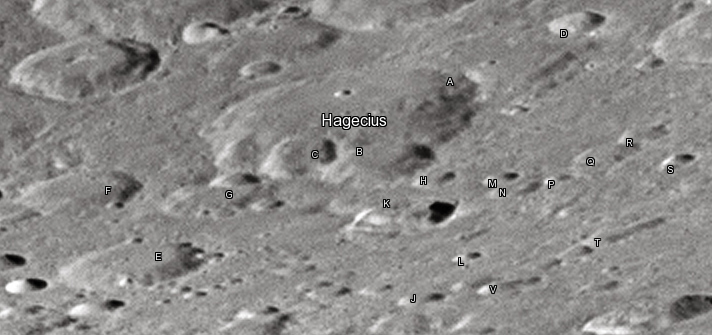
Hagecius crater and its satellite craters taken from Earth in 2012 at the University of Hertfordshire's Bayfordbury Observatory with the telescopes Meade LX200 14" and Lumenera Skynyx 2-1

By convention these features are identified on lunar maps by placing the letter on the side of the crater midpoint that is closest to Hagecius.

Hagecius	Latitude	Longitude	Diameter
A	58.2° S	47.2° E	61 km
B	60.4° S	48.9° E	34 km
C	60.7° S	47.5° E	24 km
D	57.1° S	47.0° E	17 km
E	63.3° S	49.1° E	44 km
F	62.3° S	44.8° E	36 km
G	61.8° S	47.6° E	30 km
H	60.4° S	50.7° E	13 km
J	62.6° S	57.8° E	14 km
K	61.2° S	52.0° E	31 km
L	61.5° S	55.7° E	8 km
M	60.0° S	52.0° E	10 km
N	60.2° S	53.1° E	16 km
P	59.8° S	53.2° E	7 km
Q	59.2° S	53.0° E	20 km
R	58.7° S	52.7° E	15 km
S	59.0° S	54.6° E	10 km
T	60.6° S	57.4° E	14 km
V	61.9° S	58.3° E	14 km

== See also ==
- 1995 Hajek, asteroid
