= Nearch (crater) =

Lunar impact crater

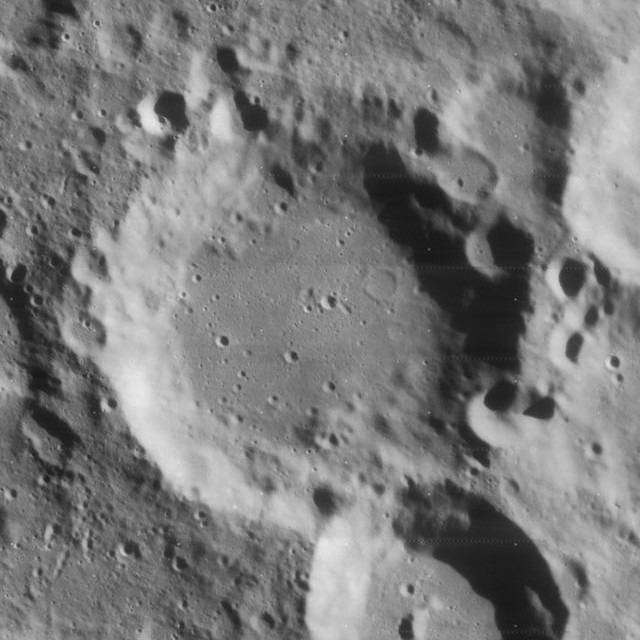
- Lunar Orbiter 4 image
- Coordinates: 58.5°S 39.1°E
- Diameter: 49 km
- Depth: 49 km
- Colongitude: 49° at sunrise
- Formation: Pre-Nectarian
- Eponym: Nearchus

Nearch is a lunar impact crater that is located in the southeastern part of the Moon, to the southeast of the crater Hommel. North of Nearch is Vlacq, and to the northeast lies Rosenberger. The crater is 76 kilometers in diameter and 2.9 kilometers deep. It is from the Pre-Nectarian period, 4.55 to 3.92 billion years ago.

The outer rim of Nearch has been worn by smaller impacts, and is overlain by a few more significant craters along the eastern rim. The most notable of these is Nearch A, a 43-kilometer-diameter crater that intrudes into the southeastern rim of Nearch. Small craters have also disrupted the rim to the north and west. The remainder of the rim is relatively intact, and retains its generally circular form.

The inner walls of the crater slope down to a relatively level interior floor. This bottom floor is nearly featureless except for a few tiny craterlets scattered across the surface. In the southeast, the ejecta from Nearch A has produced a slightly more irregular region.

Nearch is named after Nearchus, a 4th-century BC Greek explorer.

== Satellite craters ==
By convention these features are identified on lunar maps by placing the letter on the side of the crater midpoint that is closest to Nearch.

Nearch	Latitude	Longitude	Diameter
A	60.1° S	40.1° E	43 km
B	60.9° S	35.8° E	43 km
C	62.2° S	35.8° E	41 km
D	57.0° S	38.0° E	10 km
E	61.4° S	33.9° E	11 km
F	62.9° S	37.9° E	8 km
G	63.3° S	39.8° E	5 km
H	57.6° S	40.6° E	9 km
J	57.6° S	37.4° E	7 km
K	57.9° S	35.3° E	13 km
L	58.4° S	35.6° E	18 km
M	58.4° S	35.0° E	7 km
