= Hommel (crater) =

Lunar impact crater

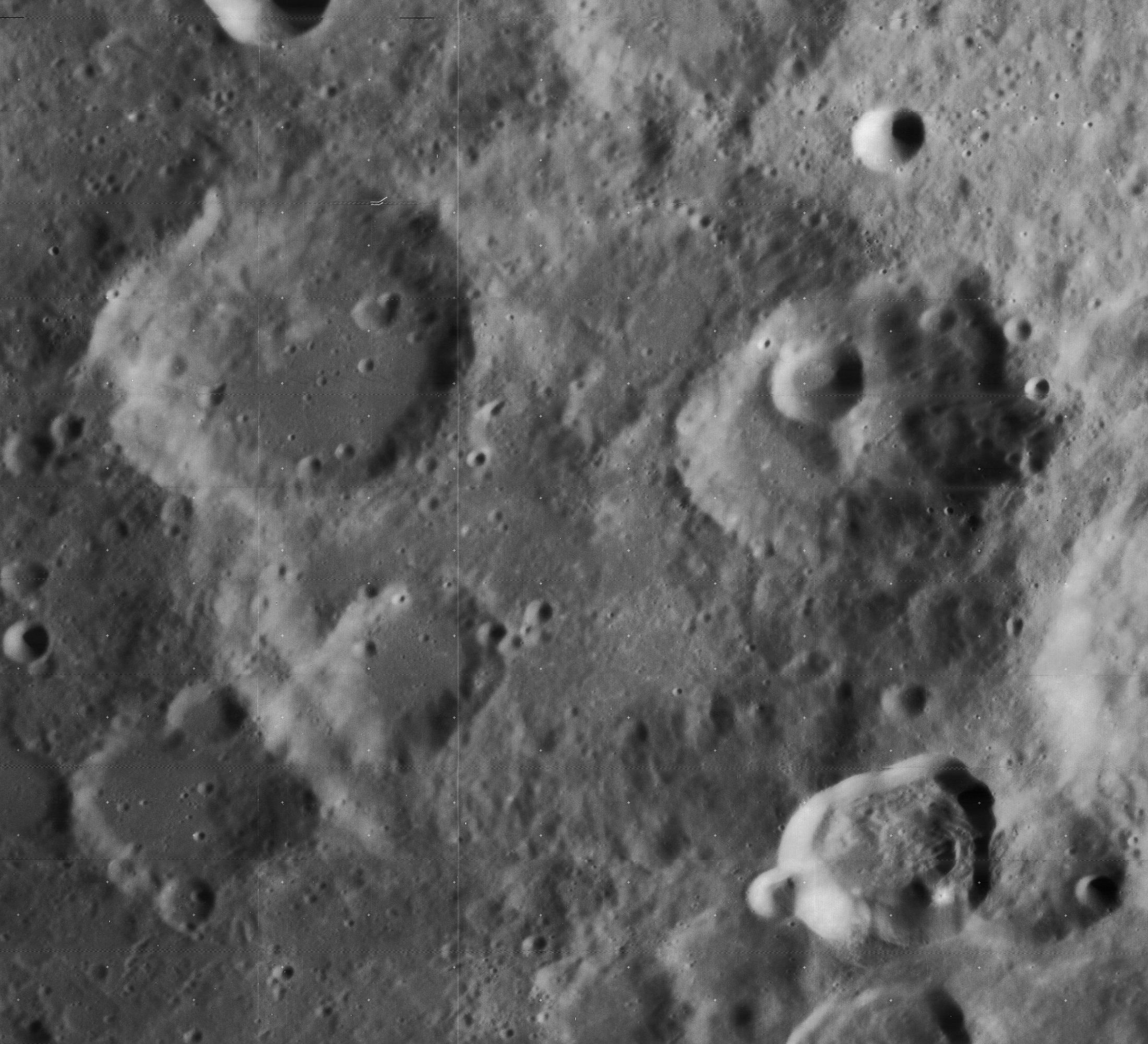
- Lunar Orbiter 4 image
- Coordinates: 54.6°S 33.0°E
- Diameter: 120 km
- Depth: 2.8 km
- Colongitude: 326° at sunrise
- Eponym: Johann Hommel

Hommel is a lunar impact crater located in the southeast section of the Moon, in a region that is deeply impacted with a multitude of impact craters. The most notable craters nearby are Pitiscus to the north; Rosenberger due east; and Nearch to the southeast. The prominent crater Vlacq is nearly attached to the northeast rim. Also nearby is Asclepi to the west. Hommel is about 120 kilometers in diameter and its walls reach heights of 2,800 meters. It is from the Pre-Nectarian period, 4.55 to 3.92 billion years ago.

The eroded outer wall of Hommel is overlain and incised by a number of smaller but still sizeable craters. Hommel C overlays the western rim and Hommel A the north. Intruding into the rim are Hommel H to the northwest, Hommel B in the east, and Hommel P along the southern wall. These craters are in turn overlain by smaller craterlets. The crater Hommel D lies on the southern part of the inner floor, incising into the south rim. In the midpoint of the crater is a low central peak.

The crater is named for 16th century German mathematician and astronomer Johann Hommel.

== Satellite craters ==
By convention these features are identified on lunar maps by placing the letter on the side of the crater midpoint that is closest to Hommel.

Hommel	Latitude	Longitude	Diameter
A	53.7° S	34.3° E	51 km
B	55.3° S	37.0° E	33 km
C	54.8° S	29.6° E	53 km
D	55.8° S	32.5° E	28 km
E	59.0° S	31.0° E	14 km
F	58.4° S	32.0° E	21 km
G	58.1° S	27.4° E	30 km
H	52.6° S	30.9° E	43 km
HA	52.0° S	30.5° E	8 km
J	53.5° S	27.9° E	18 km
K	55.5° S	27.0° E	16 km
L	56.1° S	27.9° E	18 km
M	59.8° S	27.5° E	7 km
N	59.3° S	28.8° E	14 km
O	58.5° S	28.2° E	6 km
P	56.9° S	31.7° E	34 km
Q	56.1° S	38.4° E	29 km
R	52.6° S	32.6° E	11 km
S	56.6° S	36.2° E	22 km
T	57.6° S	26.3° E	22 km
V	53.5° S	33.5° E	13 km
X	60.9° S	32.2° E	6 km
Y	60.4° S	30.8° E	4 km
Z	59.8° S	30.4° E	4 km
