= Otto August Rosenberger =

German astronomer (1800–1890)

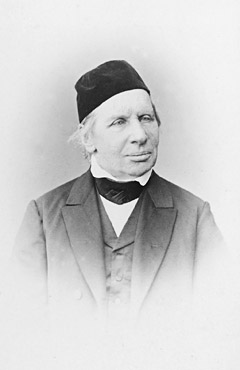
- Otto August Rosenberger in 1890
- Born: 10 August 1800; Tukums, Courland, Russian Empire
- Died: 23 January 1890 (aged 89); Halle, Prussian Saxony
- Occupation: Astronomer
- Known for: Rosenberger (crater)

Otto August Rosenberger (10 August 1800 – 23 January 1890) was a German astronomer from Tukums in Courland.

== Life ==
He was born in Tukkum, Courland, Russia, to a Baltic German family. Rosenberger graduated from the University of Königsberg, and was noted for his study of comets. He won the Gold Medal of the Royal Astronomical Society in 1837. He died in Halle, Prussian Saxony.

The crater Rosenberger on the Moon is named after him.

== Sources ==
- "Розенбергер, Отто Август" . Brockhaus and Efron Encyclopedic Dictionary (in Russian). 1906.
