= Giuseppe Asclepi =

Italian astronomer and physician

Giuseppe Maria Asclepi (1706–1776) was an Italian astronomer and physician. He was a Jesuit and director of the observatory at the Collegio Romano.

The lunar crater Asclepi is named after him.

== Works ==
- Nuova proprietà delle potenze de 'numeri
- Tentamen novae de odoribus theorie, Siena, 1749.
- Lettera sopra l'oriuolo ultramontano (in Italian). Siena. 1750 – via Bonetti.
- De veneris per solem transitu exercitatio astronomica habita in Collegio Romano, Rome, 1761.
- De motum gravium rectilineo, Rome, 1762-1763.
- De objectivi micrometri usu in planetarum diametris metiendis. Exercitatio optico-astronomica habita in Collegio Romano a Patribus Societatis Jesu, Rome, 1765.
- De nova et facili methodo elevandi Mercurium in tubis ad altitudinem consuetam maiorem (in Latin). Rome. 1767 – via Giovanni Generoso Salomoni.
- De cometarum motu exercitatio astronomica habita in collegio Romano patribus Societatis Jesu.Prid.Non.Septem, Rome, 1769.
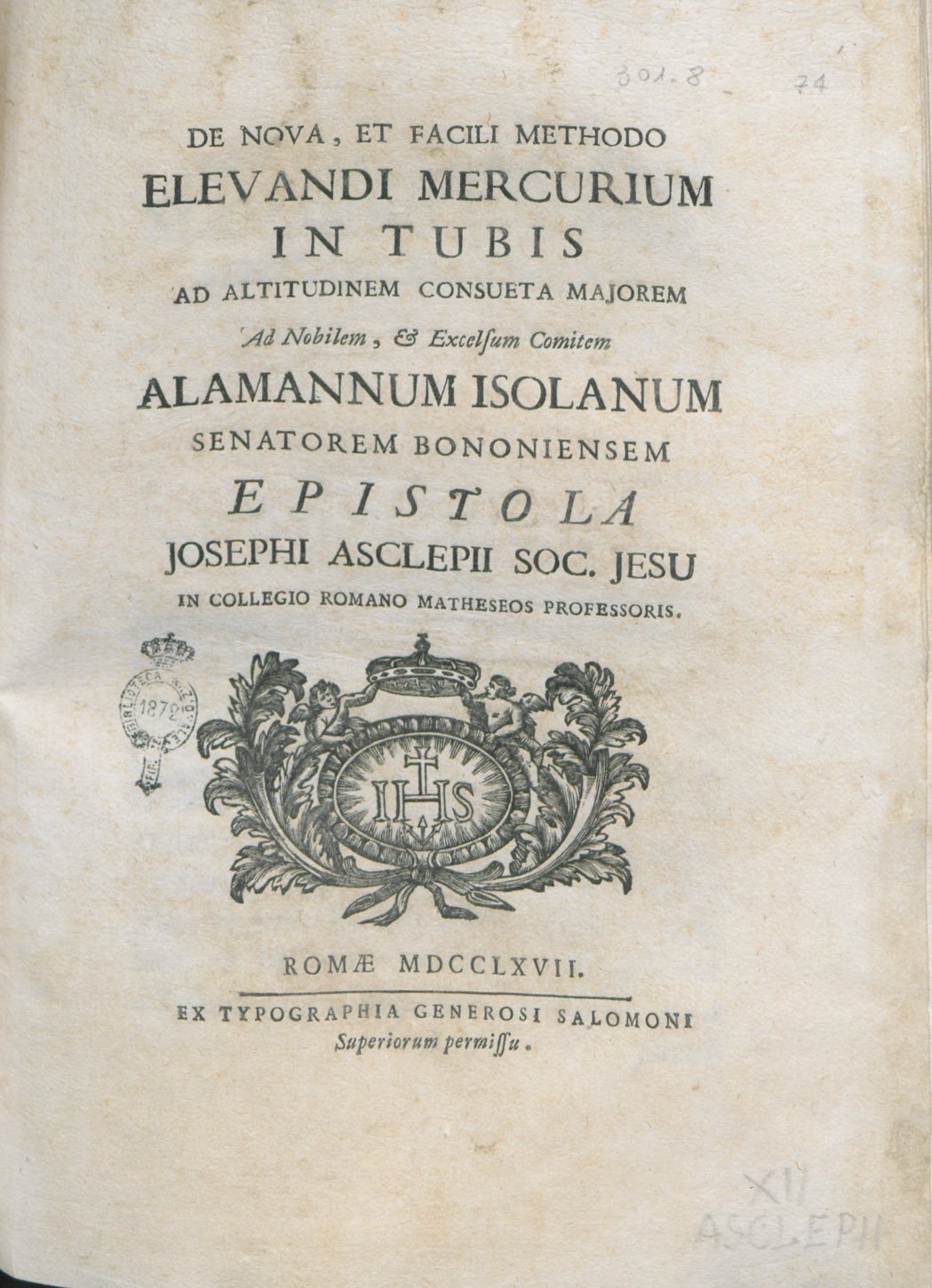
De nova et facili methodo elevandi Mercurium in tubis ad altitudinem consuetam maiorem, 1767

== See also ==
- List of Jesuit scientists
- List of Roman Catholic scientist-clerics
