= Johann Hommel =

German astronomer and mathematician

Johann Hommel (also Johannes Homelius, Hummelius, Homilius, Hummel; 2 February 1518 in Memmingen – 4 July 1562 in Leipzig) was a German astronomer and mathematician.

== Work ==
Hommel was appointed professor of mathematics at the University of Leipzig in 1551.

In 1552 or 1553, Richard Cantzlar introduced transversal dot lines in graduations. It was a variant of the zigzag line system introduced by Hommel. Tycho Brahe obtained the zigzag line system from Hommel.

The lunar crater Hommel is named after him.

== Sources ==
- Johann Daniel Schulze, Abriß einer Geschichte der Leipziger Universität, Hinrichs, 1810, p. 48.
- Kevin Krisciunas (1999), "Observatories"
- Torsten Woitkowitz: Der Landvermesser, Kartograph, Astronom und Mechaniker Johannes Humelius (1518–1562) und die Leipziger Universität um die Mitte des 16. Jahrhunderts, in: Sudhoffs Archiv 92 (2008), S. 65–97.
- Marion Gindhart and Alexander Hubert: Art. „Mathematische Wissenschaften (CamLex)“, in: Opera Camerarii Online, https://wiki.camerarius.de/Mathematische_Wissenschaften_(CamLex), section „Camerarius und Johann Hommel“.
