= Itogi Nauki i Techniki =

Russian journal

Itogi Nauki i Techniki (Итоги науки и техники, Review of Science and Technique, established 1972 in Moscow) is a Russian journal, publishing several series for a variety of areas in science and technology, including mathematics, biology, astronomy, and motor vehicles.
