= Samuel Hayek =

British-Israeli businessman

- שמואל האייק
- Born: 1953 (age 72–73)
- Citizenship: British-Israeli
- Occupation: Businessman
- Known for: Chairman of JNF-UK

Samuel Hayek (Hebrew: שמואל האייק; born 1953) is a British-Israeli businessman who has been chairman of JNF-UK since August 2008. Hayek was chairman of the Likud youth department.

== Biography ==
Born in Kfar Saba, Israel, Hayek is a British citizen and splits his time between London and Tel Aviv. He was appointed Director of JNF-UK in August 2008 and has been strongly critical of the Jewish Leadership Council.

== Controversies ==
In a December 2021 interview with The Jerusalem Post, Hayek spoke about what he saw as rising levels of antisemitism in the UK. He claimed that "in 10 years, maybe less, who knows, Jews will not be able to live in the UK." When asked by Jewish News to clarify his reasoning, Hayek claimed that "the demographic of British society is changing [due to] the number of immigrants coming to England". He confirmed that the immigrants he was referring to were Muslims, who he claimed "don't speak English [and] create their own ghettos, their own education, their own process of thinking."

Leaders of the Board of Deputies, Jewish Leadership Council and Community Security Trust all condemned Hayek's comments, as did the Chief Rabbi Ephraim Mirvis. Jewish MP Alex Sobel called for either Hayek to resign as chair of JNF UK or the isolation of the JNF UK from communal organisations while Hayek remained in his position.

On 4 January 2022, more than 45 members of the BoD signed a letter calling for Hayek to resign, and stated that they would continue to advise the synagogues do not participate, support, cooperate with JNF-UK as long as he remained chair. On 10 January, another letter signed by 105 Jewish student leaders to suspend all programmes run by the JNF UK and to suspend JNF membership from the Board of Deputies. On 13 January, the Charity Commission for England and Wales opened a regulatory case on JNF UK to assess concerns. On the 21 January Hayek wrote an article in The Jewish Chronicle stating that he stood by his remarks and was "not against any minority or against the Muslims in the UK or Europe, but against anyone who spreads hatred that harms Jews", and that his previous remarks were "misconstrued". On 23 January, the Board of Deputies voted in favour of censuring the JNF-UK, noting the failure of the latter's trustees to condemn Hayek's remarks.
