= Hájek–Le Cam convolution theorem =

In statistics, the Hájek–Le Cam convolution theorem states that any regular estimator in a parametric model is asymptotically equivalent to a sum of two independent random variables, one of which is normal with asymptotic variance equal to the inverse of Fisher information, and the other having arbitrary distribution.

The obvious corollary from this theorem is that the "best" among regular estimators are those with the second component identically equal to zero. Such estimators are called efficient and are known to always exist for regular parametric models.

The theorem is named after Jaroslav Hájek and Lucien Le Cam.

== Statement ==
Let ℘ = {P_{θ} | θ ∈ Θ ⊂ ℝ^{k}} be a regular parametric model, and q(θ): Θ → ℝ^{m} be a parameter in this model (typically a parameter is just one of the components of vector θ). Assume that function q is differentiable on Θ, with the m × k matrix of derivatives denoted as q̇_{θ}. Define

$I_{q(\theta)}^{-1} = \dot{q}(\theta)I^{-1}(\theta)\dot{q}(\theta)'$ — the information bound for q,

$\psi_{q(\theta)} = \dot{q}(\theta)I^{-1}(\theta)\dot\ell(\theta)$ — the efficient influence function for q,

where I(θ) is the Fisher information matrix for model ℘, $\scriptstyle\dot\ell(\theta)$ is the score function, and ′ denotes matrix transpose.

Theorem (Bickel 1998, Th.2.3.1). Suppose T_{n} is a uniformly (locally) regular estimator of the parameter q. Then

1. There exist independent random m-vectors $\scriptstyle Z_\theta\,\sim\,\mathcal{N}(0,\,I^{-1}_{q(\theta)})$ and Δ_{θ} such that
  $$\sqrt{n}(T_n - q(\theta)) \ \xrightarrow{d}\ Z_\theta + \Delta_\theta,$$
  where ^{d} denotes convergence in distribution. More specifically,
  $$\begin{pmatrix}
\sqrt{n}(T_n - q(\theta)) - \tfrac{1}{\sqrt{n}} \sum_{i=1}^n \psi_{q(\theta)}(x_i) \\
\tfrac{1}{\sqrt{n}} \sum_{i=1}^n \psi_{q(\theta)}(x_i)
\end{pmatrix}
\ \xrightarrow{d}\
\begin{pmatrix}
\Delta_\theta \\
Z_\theta
\end{pmatrix}.$$
2. If the map θ → q̇_{θ} is continuous, then the convergence in (A) holds uniformly on compact subsets of Θ. Moreover, in that case Δ_{θ} = 0 for all θ if and only if T_{n} is uniformly (locally) asymptotically linear with influence function ψ_{q(θ)}
