= Miloš Hájek =

Miloš Hájek (12 May 1921 – 25 February 2016) was a Czech historian, politician and Czechoslovak resistance fighter during the German occupation of Czechoslovakia (1938–1945). Hájek, who signed the Charter 77 human rights manifesto in 1977, became the spokesman for the Charter 77 movement in 1988.

Hájek was born in Dětenice, Czechoslovakia, in 1921. In 1938, Nazi Germany began its occupation of Czechoslovakia. Together with his later wife Alena Hájková, Hájek became involved with the Czech resistance and other anti-Nazi groups to help Jews obtain hideouts and false identity papers during World War II. He was arrested by the Gestapo in August 1944 and sentenced to death in March 1945. However, his execution was not carried out before the Prague uprising and the end of the German occupation. He was later honored as "Righteous Among the Nations" by Israel for his work to save Jews during the Holocaust.

Hájek became a member of the Communist Party of Czechoslovakia (KSČ) following the war, but opposed the KSČ's party leadership throughout the country's Communist era. He broke with the party's leaders during the Prague Spring in 1968 to join the reform movement. He was expelled from the Communist Party following the Warsaw Pact invasion of Czechoslovakia, which ended the Prague Spring. He was also fired from his job, but went into retirement because he had been a World War II resistance fighter, thanks to the help of his ex wife.

In 1977, Hájek joined with a group of Czechoslovak dissidents, including Václav Havel, to sign the Charter 77 human rights manifesto.

Miloš Hájek died in Prague on 25 February 2016, at the age of 94. His granddaughter Anna is a Holocaust historian at the University of Warwick.
