= Annales Fennici Mathematici =

- Discipline: Mathematics
- Language: English
- Edited by: Olli Martio

Publication details
- Former name(s): Annales Academiae Scientiarum Fennicae; Annales Academiae Scientiarum Fennicae Mathematica
- History: 1941–present
- Publisher: Finnish Academy of Science and Letters (Finland)
- Frequency: Bi-annually
- Open access: Yes
- Impact factor: 0.941 (2017)

Standard abbreviations
- ISO 4: Ann. Fenn. Math.

Indexing
- ISSN: 1239-629X (print); 1798-2383 (web)

Links
- Journal homepage

Annales Fennici Mathematici (formerly Annales Academiæ Scientiarum Fennicæ Mathematica and Annales Academiæ Scientiarum Fennicæ) is a peer-reviewed scientific journal published by the Finnish Academy of Science and Letters since 1941. Its founder and editor until 1974 was Pekka Myrberg. It is currently edited by Olli Martio. It publishes research papers in all domains of mathematics, with particular emphasis on analysis. The journal acquired its current name in 2021.

== Abstracting and indexing ==
The journal is indexed and abstracted in the following bibliographic databases:

- Academic Search Premier
- DOAJ
- MathSciNet
- Science Citation Index Expanded
- Scopus
- zbMATH
