= Adam Tanner (Jesuit theologian) =

Austrian Jesuit theologian

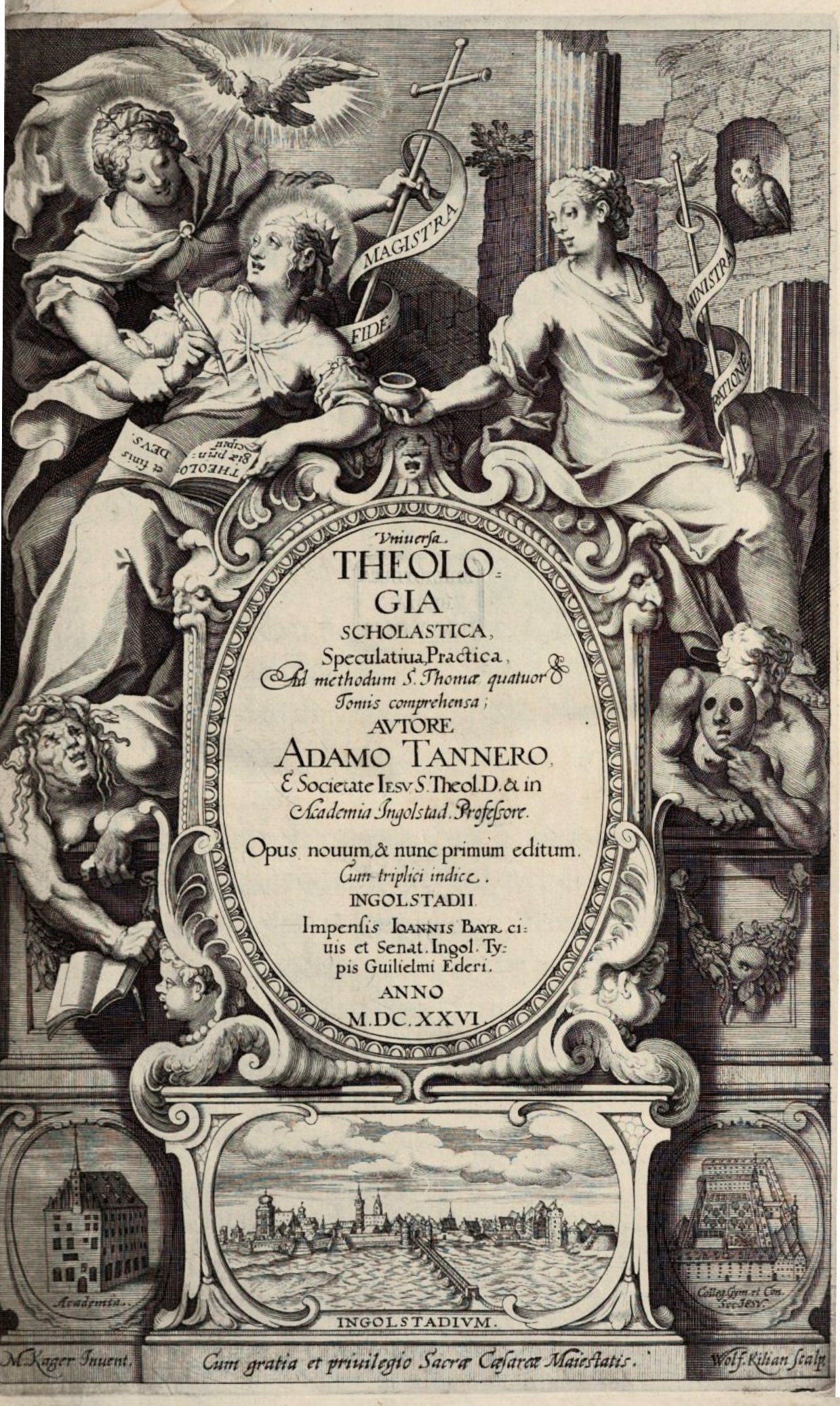
Title page of vol. 1 of Tanner's Universa Theologia Scholastica (1626)

Adam Tanner (in Latin, Tannerus; April 14, 1572 – May 25, 1632) was an Austrian Jesuit theologian.

== Teaching career ==
He was born in Innsbruck, Austria. In 1589 he joined the Society of Jesus and became a teacher. By 1603 he was invited to join the Jesuit College of Ingolstadt and take the chair of theology at the University of Ingolstadt. Fifteen years later he was given a position at the University of Vienna by the Emperor Matthias.

== Theological work ==
He was noted for his defense of the Catholic church and their practices against Lutheran reformers, as well as the Utraquists. His greatest work was the Universa theologia scholastica, published in 1626–1627.

Tanner was also noted for his opposition to the witch hunts. During his time in Bavaria, he witnessed contemporary debates in which the skeptics had some success imposing limits on the witch trials. He included a number of these skeptics' arguments in his Universa theologia scholastica, for instance, "that the use of torture makes the death of innocent people inevitable, that several denunciations are not sufficient to warrant torture, that torture may not be repeated". These arguments were subsequently influential on his fellow Jesuit Friedrich Spee, another opponent of the witch hunts.

== Death and controversy over his burial ==
He died in the village of Unken near Salzburg. His grave can no longer be located due to renovations to the church. According to legend, the villagers initially refused him a Christian burial because a microscope was found among his belongings containing a small hairy insect, which they took to be a "harry little imp." The microscope had been given to him by Christoph Scheiner.

== Legacy ==
The crater Tannerus on the Moon is named after him.

== Bibliography ==
- Anatomiæ confessionis augustanæ, 1613, Ingolstadt.
- Astrologia sacra, 1615, Ingolstadt.
- Apologia pro Societate Iesu ex Boemiae regno: Ab eiusdem regni statibus religionis sub utraque publico decreto immerito proscripta, 1618, Vienna.
- Universa theologia scholastica, 1627, Ingolstadt.
