= Peter Hajek =

British psychologist

Peter Hajek is a British psychologist. He is professor of clinical psychology and director of the Wolfson Institute of Preventive Medicine's Tobacco Dependence Research Unit at Queen Mary University of London. He is known for his research into smoking cessation, including the effectiveness of electronic cigarettes for this purpose.

== Education and academic career ==
Hajek received his PhD from Charles University in Prague in 1973. In 1982, he moved to England, where he joined the Institute of Psychiatry's Addiction Research Unit. He became a lecturer at Barts and The London School of Medicine and Dentistry in 1992, and became a professor there in 1998.

== Scientific work ==
Hajek is the author of over 250 peer-reviewed papers, and has helped develop treatments for people who are dependent on cigarette smoking. He is known for his research into electronic cigarettes, which, he has said, are "at least as effective as nicotine patches" for smoking cessation in the context of minimum support. In 2014, Hajek and other researchers published a paper criticizing a World Health Organization report on electronic cigarettes published earlier that year, which they said had made "misleading" assumptions. Hajek has told the BBC that "...the risks [of electronic cigarettes] are unlikely, some already proven not to exist, while the benefits are potentially enormous." Also in 2014, Hajek co-authored a Cochrane review of the effectiveness of electronic cigarettes for smoking cessation; the review found limited evidence that they were effective for this purpose. Hajek described the results of this review as "encouraging". In February 2019 he published "A Randomized Trial of E-Cigarettes versus Nicotine-Replacement Therapy" in the New England Journal of Medicine. This study demonstrated that smokers who used e-cigarettes to help them quit were 83% more likely to have quit smoking at one year than those who used conventional nicotine replacement therapy. However, according to a review article by Hussein Traboulsi et al. in May 2020 Hajek's study also resulted in more smokers becoming dual users than succeeded in complete abstinence; "Nonetheless, the continued use of and dependence on nicotine and the creation of dual users were issues in this trial. Among participants with 1-year abstinence, 80% were still using e-cigarettes in the e-cigarette group and 9% were still using nicotine replacement in the nicotine replacement group 52 weeks later. Additionally, while 18% of the e-cigarette users achieved complete abstinence, 25% (110/438) became dual users of e-cigarettes and conventional cigarettes."
