= Alena Hájková =

Czech activist and historian (1924–2012)

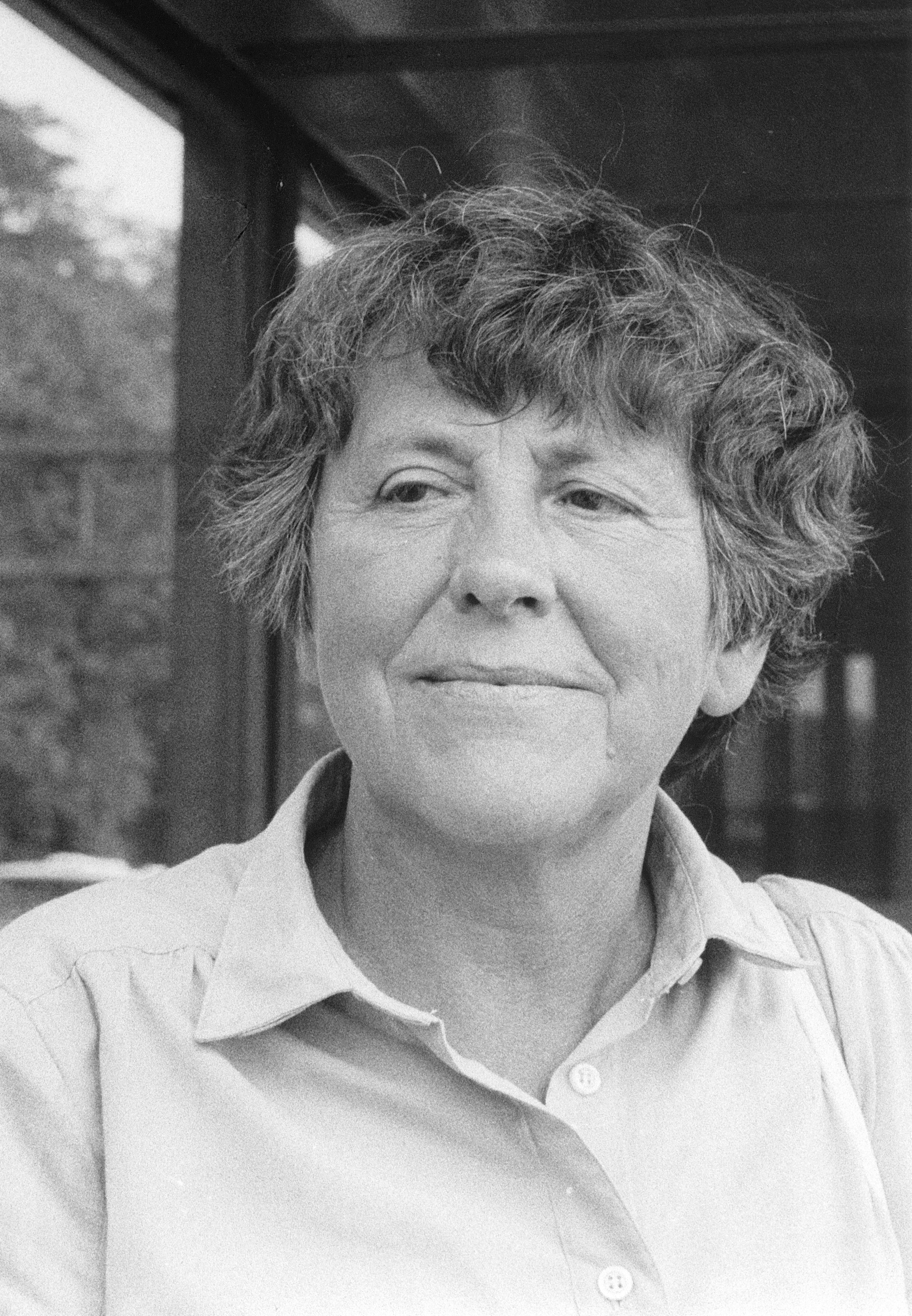
- Alena Hájkova in the 1980s
- Born: Alena Divišová; 11 October 1924; Prague, Czechoslovakia
- Died: 2 August 2012 (aged 87); Prague, Czech Republic
- Occupation: Historian

Alena Hájková (née Divišová; 11 October 1924 – 2 August 2012) was a Czech Communist resistance fighter and historian.

== Resistance ==
Alena Divišová was born in 1924 to a working class Prague family in Vršovice. At 14, she left school and went to train as a seamstress. It was in her job that she met a Jewish friend, through whom she was introduced to a Jewish circle of the leftist movement Hashomer Hatzair. In 1943, this group of Jewish and non-Jewish Communist friends formed the resistance group Přehledy. Among them, Hájková met Jany Lebovič from the eastern part of Czechoslovakia, with whom she fell in love. When the transports to Theresienstadt started in fall 1941, Hájková and her family helped the deportees with food and preparation for the transports. Later, the gentiles in the group helped the Jewish members to avoid transports by giving them false, non-Jewish identities. Among those who had gone to hiding was Lebovič. Hájková participated in helping Jewish friends and other resistance activities: in the first months of the Terezín ghetto, she visited a few times and smuggled food to her friends. Later, she actively organized papers for those who went into illegality. In March 1944, she was arrested and deported to the Theresienstadt Small Fortress and in July 1944 to Ravensbrück concentration camp. Before her liberation in April 1945, she was made to do forced labor for the German armament industry, specifically the firm Hasag in the Schlieben and Altenburg satellite camps of Buchenwald. Hájková escaped in April 1945 from a death march during a bomb raid in Zwickau.

== Postwar ==
Upon her return to Prague, Hájková learned that her fiancé had been arrested together with most of the Přehledy group in August 1944, and murdered in Auschwitz. She and a friend from Přehledy, Miloš Hájek, married and had two sons. Their marriage ended in divorce in 1971. She started studying in 1945 at the University of Political and Social Affairs (Vysoká škola politická a sociální), but her studies were interrupted when her children were born. In 1952, at the height of the Slánský trials, she was one of the few who supported her friends when they were arrested. Hájková studied history at the Faculty of Arts, Charles University in Prague and, in 1960, received her PhD. All the while, she was supporting her husband in his academic career. In 1960, she started working full time as a historian: until 1965, she worked as a lecturer of humanities at ČVUT, and then spent five years at the Czechoslovak committee for history of antifascist resistance. During normalization, she spent her last working years as specialist in the defense ministry, where it was her job to write confirmations of participation in the resistance according to the law 255/1946. This law enabled many former resistance fighters, who were now dissidents, to receive an early pension.

Her granddaughter Anna Hájková is a historian at the University of Warwick.

== Research ==
Hájková's expertise was leftist and Communist resistance during the Second World War; she focused on individual people and wrote about Jewish Communist resistance fighters who were politically unpopular. Her books and articles are still in circulation, unlike most Czech scholarship from her time. In 1989, Hájková was reunited with her old Jewish friends from the resistance who had emigrated to Israel and the US. In 1991, she was awarded the title Righteous among the nations." In 1995, she coedited a critical edition of Julius Fučík's Notes from the Gallows. She cooperated with Miroslav Kárný on researching the Holocaust and resistance in the Protectorate, and contributed to the research of the Terezín Memorial, including their prisoner database.

Hájková continued researching until her 80s, and died in Prague in 2012. Her papers are stored at the Czech National Archive.

== Publications ==
- Hájková, Alena; Janáček, František; Novotný, Josef (1975). Strana v odboji (in Czech). Prague: Svoboda.
- Hájková, Alena; Gebhardt, Jan; Kuklík, Jan (1980). 2245 dní odporu (in Czech). Prague: Svoboda.
- Hájková, Alena; Janáček, František (1984). Praha v komunistickém odboji (in Czech). Prague: Svoboda.
- Hájková, Alena; Tomášek, Dušan (1988). XYZ: Poslední popravy v Terezíně (in Czech). Prague: Svoboda.
- Hájková, Alena (1992). Kárný, Miroslav; Blodig, Vojtěch; Kárná, Margita (eds.). "Die sieben Tapferen," Theresienstadt in der "Endlösung der Judenfrage" (in German). Prague: Logos. pp. 202–212.
- Fučík, Julius (1995). Janáček, František (ed.). Reportáž, psaná na oprátce. První úplné, kritické a komentované vydání (in Czech). Prague: Torst.
- Hájková, Alena (1997). Erfassung der jüdischen Bevölkerung des Protektorates", Theresienstädter Studien und Dokumente (in German). pp. 50–62.
- Hájková, Alena (2002). "Říkali mu Jany," Terezínské Listy (in Czech). pp. 109–116.
