= Pitiscus (crater) =

Crater on the Moon

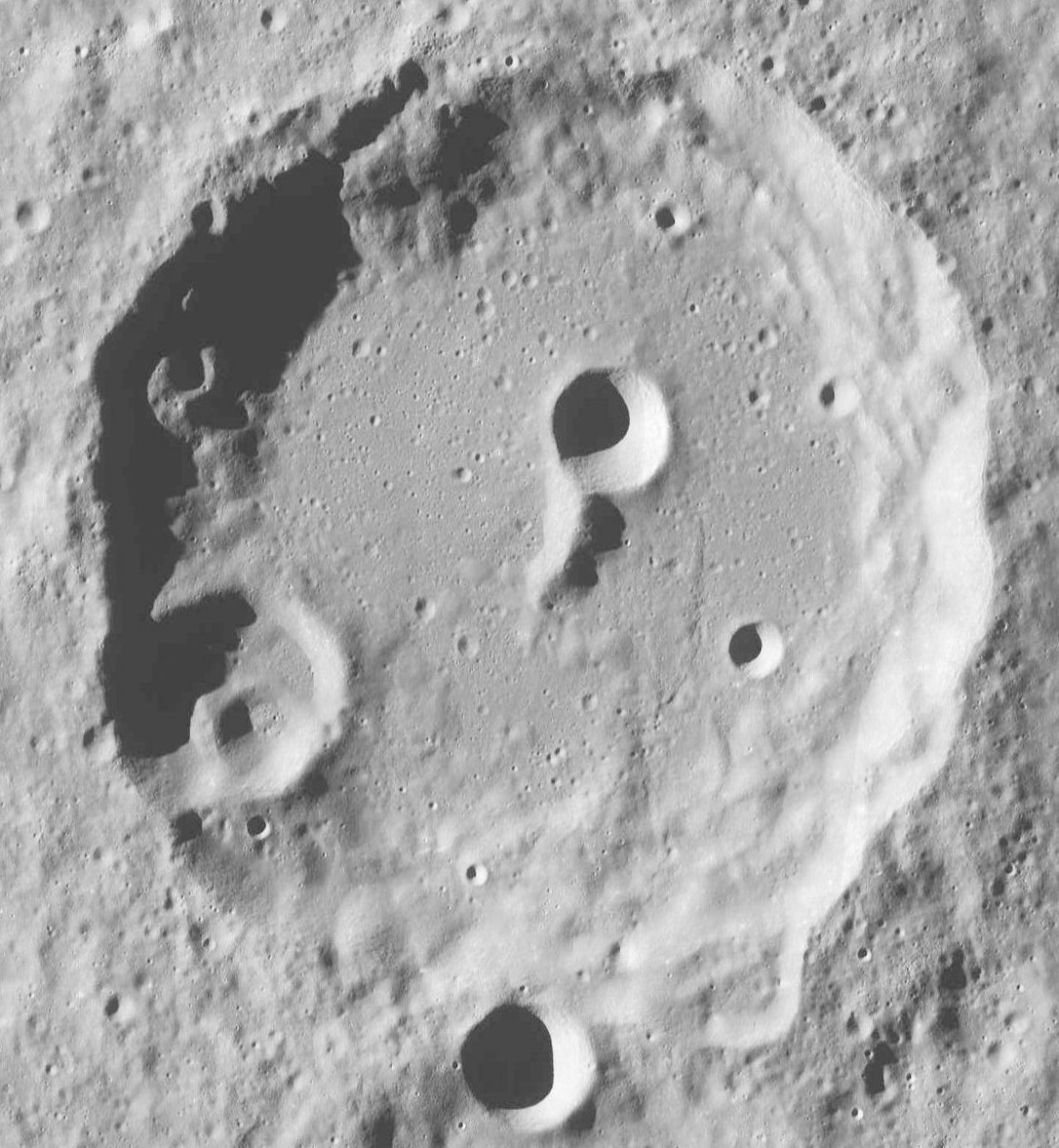
- LRO global mosaic image
- Coordinates: 50.61°S 30.57°E
- Diameter: 79.85 km
- Depth: 3.0 km
- Colongitude: 330° at sunrise
- Formation: Nectarian or Imbrian
- Eponym: Bartholomaeus Pitiscus

Pitiscus is a lunar impact crater that lies in the southern part of the Moon's near side, just to the northwest of the larger crater Hommel. It was named after German mathematician Bartholomaeus Pitiscus in 1935. The crater is worn, but still forms a prominent feature upon the surface. The rim is roughly circular, but appears oval from the Earth due to foreshortening. There is an outward bulge to the south-southeast where the interior has slumped. The remainder of the inner wall still displays terraces, although they are worn and rounded due to erosion.

On the lunar geologic timescale, Pitiscus is a crater of Nectarian or Imbrian age. The interior floor is level and appears to have been resurfaced by lava. There is a low central peak formation at the midpoint of the interior, and the northern end of this ridge is overlaid by the circular crater Pitiscus A. A slumped and somewhat irregular crater, Pitiscus E, lies along the inner wall to the west-southwest. The interior floor is also marked by several other tiny craters alongside the eastern interior wall.

== Satellite craters ==
By convention these features are identified on lunar maps by placing the letter on the side of the crater midpoint that is closest to Pitiscus.

Pitiscus	Latitude	Longitude	Diameter
A	50.3° S	30.9° E	10 km
B	47.7° S	30.5° E	25 km
C	47.1° S	28.3° E	17 km
D	49.0° S	26.5° E	22 km
E	50.9° S	29.3° E	13 km
F	46.9° S	29.5° E	13 km
G	47.6° S	25.2° E	15 km
J	48.2° S	26.5° E	7 km
K	46.3° S	29.9° E	16 km
L	51.2° S	33.6° E	9 km
R	48.6° S	28.3° E	25 km
S	47.7° S	27.6° E	28 km
T	46.9° S	27.9° E	8 km
U	48.9° S	33.3° E	6 km
V	49.3° S	34.3° E	5 km
W	50.3° S	27.7° E	24 km
