= 1995 Hajek =

Metallic main-belt asteroid

Discovery
- Discovered by: L. Kohoutek
- Discovery site: Bergedorf Obs.
- Discovery date: 26 October 1971

Designations
- Named after: Tadeáš Hájek (astronomer)
- Alternative designations: 1971 UP_{1} · 1941 EA
- Minor planet category: main-belt · (middle)

Orbital characteristics
- Epoch 4 September 2017 (JD 2458000.5)
- Uncertainty parameter 0
- Observation arc: 76.21 yr (27,836 days)
- Aphelion: 2.6677 AU
- Perihelion: 2.3911 AU
- Semi-major axis: 2.5294 AU
- Eccentricity: 0.0547
- Orbital period (sidereal): 4.02 yr (1,469 days)
- Mean anomaly: 6.1573°
- Mean motion: 0° 14^{m} 42^{s} / day
- Inclination: 10.825°
- Longitude of ascending node: 47.232°
- Argument of perihelion: 134.65°

Physical characteristics
- Dimensions: 6.50 km (calculated); 12.683±0.288 km 14.45±2.58 km 15.29±1.04 km
- Synodic rotation period: 10 h
- Geometric albedo: 0.040±0.025; 0.063±0.010; 0.0833±0.0249; 0.20 (assumed)
- Spectral type: P · X
- Absolute magnitude (H): 12.80 · 13.06±0.33 · 13.3

1995 Hajek, provisional designation 1971 UP_{1}, is a metallic asteroid from the middle region of the asteroid belt, approximately 13 kilometers in diameter.

It was discovered on 26 October 1971 by Czech astronomer Luboš Kohoutek at the Bergedorf Observatory in Hamburg, Germany. It was named after Renaissance astronomer Tadeáš Hájek.

== Orbit and classification ==
Hajek orbits the Sun in the middle main-belt at a distance of 2.4–2.7 AU once every 4.02 years (1,469 days). Its orbit has an eccentricity of 0.05 and an inclination of 11° with respect to the ecliptic. It was first identified as 1941 EA at Heidelberg in 1941. The body's used observation was a precovery taken at Palomar Observatory in 1951, extending its observation arc by 20 years prior to the official discovery observation at Heidelberg.

== Physical characteristics ==
A first rotational lightcurve of Hajek was obtained by French amateur astronomers Alain Klotz, Marc Rieugné, and Pierre Thierry in October 2013. It gave a provisional rotation period of 10 hours with a brightness variation of 0.10 magnitude (U=1+).

Hajek has the spectral properties of a metallic X-type asteroid. It is also classified as a dark P-type asteroid by NASA's Wide-field Infrared Survey Explorer (WISE).

According to the surveys carried out by the Japanese Akari satellite and WISE space-telescope with its subsequent NEOWISE mission, Hajek measures between 12.7 and 15.3 kilometers in diameter and its surface has an albedo of 0.040 and 0.083. The Collaborative Asteroid Lightcurve Link strongly disagrees with the space-based observations and assumes a standard albedo for stony asteroids of 0.200 and calculates a much smaller diameter of 6.5 kilometers. These contrasting albedo and diameter figures closely correspond to a generic magnitude-to-diameter conversion, where, for an absolute magnitude of 13.3, the body's diameter is in the range of 6 to 14 kilometers, based on an albedo between 0.05 and 0.25.

== Naming ==
This minor planet was named after the Bohemian astronomer Tadeáš Hájek (1525–1600), better known by his Latinized name, Thaddaeus Hagecius. He was one of the founders of modern stellar and cometary astronomy, who studied the Great Comet of 1577 and the supernova SN 1572. The lunar crater Hagecius is also named in his honour. The official naming citation was published by the Minor Planet Center on 1 April 1978 (M.P.C. 4358).
