= Andrew M. Bruckner =

American mathematician (born 1932)

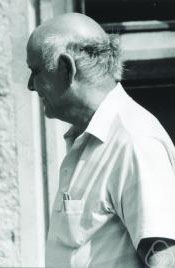
- Andrew Bruckner in 1991; Photo courtesy MFO
- Born: December 17, 1932 (age 93); Berlin, Germany
- Citizenship: United States
- Education: University of California, Los Angeles
- Scientific career
- Fields: Mathematics
- Workplaces: University of California, Santa Barbara

Andrew Michael Bruckner (born December 17, 1932) is an American retired mathematician, known for his contributions to real analysis.

He got his PhD in mathematics from University of California, Los Angeles (1959) on the dissertation Minimal Superadditive Extensions of Superadditive Functions advised by John Green (mathematician). He joined the faculty at University of California, Santa Barbara. The "Andy Award" has been given annually in his name since 1978, to significant contributors to real analysis.

In 2012 he became a fellow of the American Mathematical Society.

== Books ==
- Differentiation of real functions (American Mathematical Society, 1994)
- Real analysis (1997). With Judith B. Bruckner and Brian S. Thomson.
- Elementary real analysis (2001). With B. Thomson and J. Bruckner.
