= Sexuality and the Holocaust =

Human sexuality and the Holocaust is a topic explored in witness testimony, fiction, and academic research.
