= Hartmut Kaelble =

German historian

Hartmut Kaelble (born 12 April 1940 in Göppingen, Germany) is a German historian. From 1971 to 1991, he taught Economic and Social history as a professor at the Free University of Berlin and from 1991 to 2008, he taught social history as a professor at Humboldt University in Berlin, Germany. Kaelble is well known amongst social historians of the Federal Republic of Germany.

== Life and work ==
Hartmut Kaelble grew up in Pfalzgrafenweiler, Germany and graduated from school in Freudenstadt. Kaelble studied history, sociology, and constitutional law in Tübingen and at the Free University of Berlin from 1959 to 1965. In 1966, he received his doctorate at the Free University of Berlin with a thesis on the Central Association of German Industrialists (Centralverband deutscher Industrieller) from 1896 to 1914, which was supervised by Gerhard A. Ritter. From 1968 to 1971, he was an assistant, and then an assistant professor at the Institute for Economic and Social History at the Free University of Berlin. His habilitation in modern history took place in 1971 at the Free University of Berlin with the topic, Berlin Entrepreneurs during the early Industrialization. Kaelble also taught economic and social history as a professor at the Free University of Berlin from 1971 to 1991 and from 1991 to 2008, he taught social history as a professor at the Humboldt University in Berlin. In 1996/97, he was director of the Institute of History at the Humboldt University of Berlin. Afterwards, he was a senior professor (2008-2010, 2011–2013) at the Institute of History at Humboldt University.

== Selected works ==
- 1985. Social Mobility in the Nineteenth and Twentieth Centuries: Europe and America in Comparative Perspective. Leamington Spa, Heidelberg, and Dover: Berg.
- 1986. Industrialization and Social Inequality in Nineteenth-Century Europe. Leamington Spa and Heidelberg: Berg.
- 2001. Europäer über Europa. Frankfurt.
- 2004. The European Way: European Societies in the 19th and 20th Centuries. New York.
- 2008. (Co-edited with Martin Kirsch) Selbstverständnis und Gesellschaft der Europäer. Aspekte der sozialen und kulturellen Europäisierung im späten 19. und 20. Jahrhundert. Frankfurt.
- 2024. "Historical Comparison (english version)", version 2, Docupedia Zeitgeschichte. Potsdam.
