= Jaroslav Hájek =

Czech mathematician and statistician

Jaroslav Hájek (Czech pronunciation: [ˈjaroslaf ˈɦaːjɛk]; 1926–1974) was a Czech mathematician who worked in theoretical and nonparametric statistics. The Hajek projection and Hájek–Le Cam convolution theorem are named after him (as well as collaborator Lucien Le Cam).

== Life ==
Jaroslav Hájek studied statistical and insurance engineering at the Faculty of Special Sciences of the Czech Technical University in Prague and in 1950 he successfully completed this study by obtaining an engineering degree. In 1955 he received the title of CSc. for the paper Contributions to the theory of statistical estimation, the supervisor of this thesis was Josef Novák. In 1963, he received a D.Sc. In the same year he received his habilitation at the Faculty of Mathematics and Physics of Charles University, in 1966 he was entitled professor at this faculty. In 1973, he was awarded the Klement Gottwald State Prize for his work on the asymptotic theory of ordinal tests. He died at the age of 48 after a kidney transplant.
