= Vlacq (crater) =

Crater on the Moon

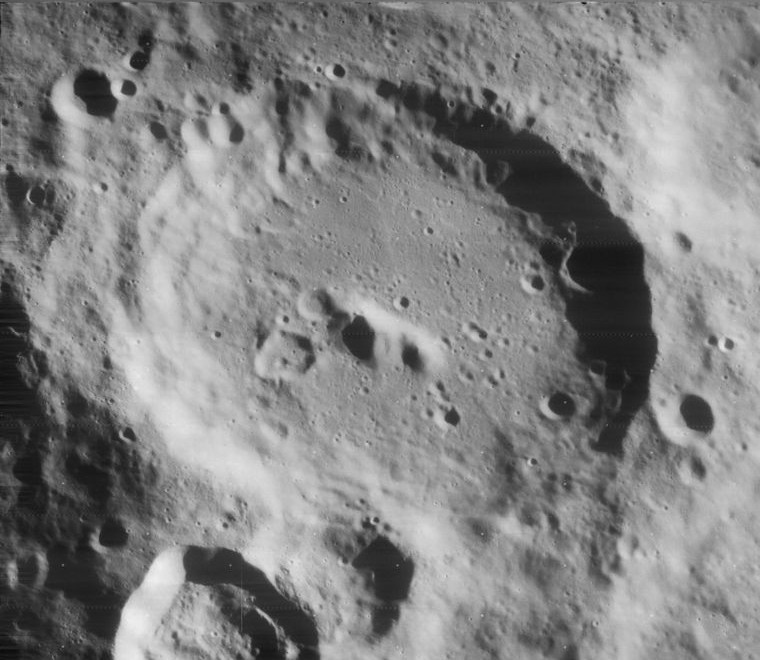
- Lunar Orbiter 4 image
- Coordinates: 53.3°S 38.8°E
- Diameter: 89 km
- Depth: 3.0 km
- Colongitude: 323° at sunrise
- Formation: Pre-Nectarian
- Eponym: Adriaan Vlacq

Vlacq is a prominent lunar impact crater that is located in the southeastern part of the Moon, and appears foreshortened when viewed from the Earth. This crater is adjacent to the northeastern rim of the larger Hommel, and to the northwest rim of Rosenberger.

On the lunar geologic timescale, this crater dates to the Pre-Nectarian epoch. This crater has become eroded, but not to the degree of the larger neighboring craters. The satellite crater Vlacq G intrudes into the southern rim of Vlacq, and is overlaid in turn along the southwest rim by the sharp-rimmed Vlacq B. The satellite crater Vlacq C is attached to the northeastern exterior rim of Vlacq.

The interior floor of Vlacq has been resurfaced by lava, leaving a nearly level base. The southwest half of the floor, however, is overlaid by ejecta from nearby impacts. In the midpoint of the floor is a rounded massif that is about 15 kilometers in length, being long along the northwest direction. The infrared spectrum of pure crystalline plagioclase has been identified on this central peak. The floor contains a number of tiny craterlets as well as several ghostly crater remnants in the western half. The most notable of these is a circular depression to the west of the central peak.

== Satellite craters ==
By convention these features are identified on lunar maps by placing the letter on the side of the crater midpoint that is closest to Vlacq.

Vlacq	Latitude	Longitude	Diameter
A	51.2° S	38.9° E	17 km
B	51.0° S	39.7° E	18 km
C	50.3° S	39.4° E	19 km
D	48.7° S	36.2° E	34 km
E	52.0° S	36.2° E	11 km
G	54.9° S	38.1° E	27 km
H	47.9° S	34.9° E	11 km
K	51.2° S	36.6° E	12 km
