= Jan Hajek (mathematician) =

Jan Hajek is a Czech scientist and mathematician, living in the Netherlands. He participated in the creation of the TCP/IP protocol. He also created 'Approver', "which was probably the first tool for the automated verification of concurrent systems".

Hajek is best known for his work on probabilistic causation indicated by relative risk, attributable risk and by formulas of I.J. Good, Kemeny, Popper, Sheps/Cheng, Pearl and Google's Brin, for data mining, epidemiology, evidence-based medicine, economy, investments or Causal INSIGHTS INSIDE for data mining to fight data tsunami and confounding.
