= Otomar Hájek =

Czech-American mathematician (1930–2016)

Otomar Hájek (December 31, 1930 – December 18, 2016) was a Czech-American mathematician, known for his contributions to dynamical systems, game theory and control theory.

He was born in Belgrade in Serbia, moving with his family to Prague in 1935, to the Netherlands in 1939 and via Algeria and southern France to London in 1940 where they lived until 1945 when they returned to Prague. After high school in 1949 he studied mathematics at Charles University in Prague, resulting in a Ph.D. in 1963 with his thesis Dynamical Systems in the Plane. At the same place he joined the mathematics and physics faculty in 1965, before moving in 1968 to Cleveland and Case Western Reserve University, where he worked until 1995 as a professor, becoming an emeritus in 1996.

In the mid-1970s, Hájek also received von Humboldt award at TH Darmstadt, Fachbereich Mathematik.

== Books ==
- Hájek, Otomar (1968), Dynamical systems in the plane, Boston, MA: Academic Press, MR 0240418
- Hájek, Otomar (2008) [1975], Pursuit Games: An Introduction to the Theory and Applications of Differential Games of Pursuit and Evasion, New York: Dover Publications, ISBN 978-0-486-46283-7, MR 0456557
- Hájek, Otomar (2008) [1991], Hájek, Otamar (ed.), Control theory in the plane, Lecture Notes in Control and Information Sciences, vol. 153, Berlin, New York: Springer-Verlag, doi:10.1007/BFb0042035, ISBN 978-3-540-85254-4, MR 1109709
