= Tadeáš Hájek =

Czech naturalist and astronomer

Tadeáš Hájek z Hájku
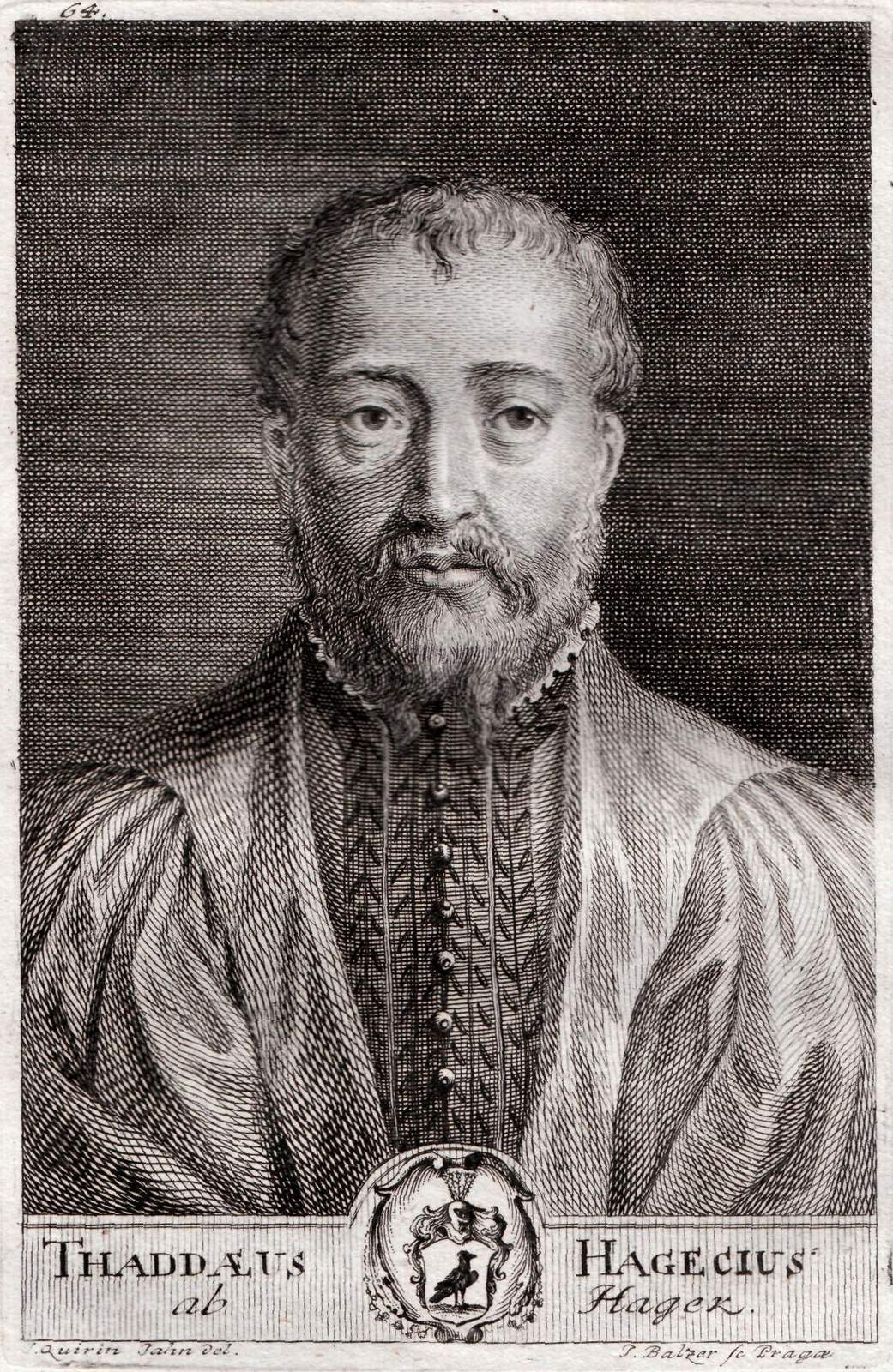
- An 18th-century engraving of Tadeáš Hájek
- Born: 1 December 1525; Prague, Bohemia
- Died: 1 September 1600 (aged 74); Prague, Bohemia

Tadeáš Hájek of Hájek (Czech: Tadeáš Hájek z Hájku, Czech pronunciation: [ˈtadeaːʃ ˈɦaːjɛk ˈzɦaːjku]; 1 December 1525 – 1 September 1600), also known by Latinized names Thaddaeus Hagecius ab Hayek and Thaddeus Nemicus, was a Czech naturalist and astronomer. He was a personal medical doctor of the Holy Roman Emperor Rudolf II and an astronomer in the Kingdom of Bohemia.

== Biography ==
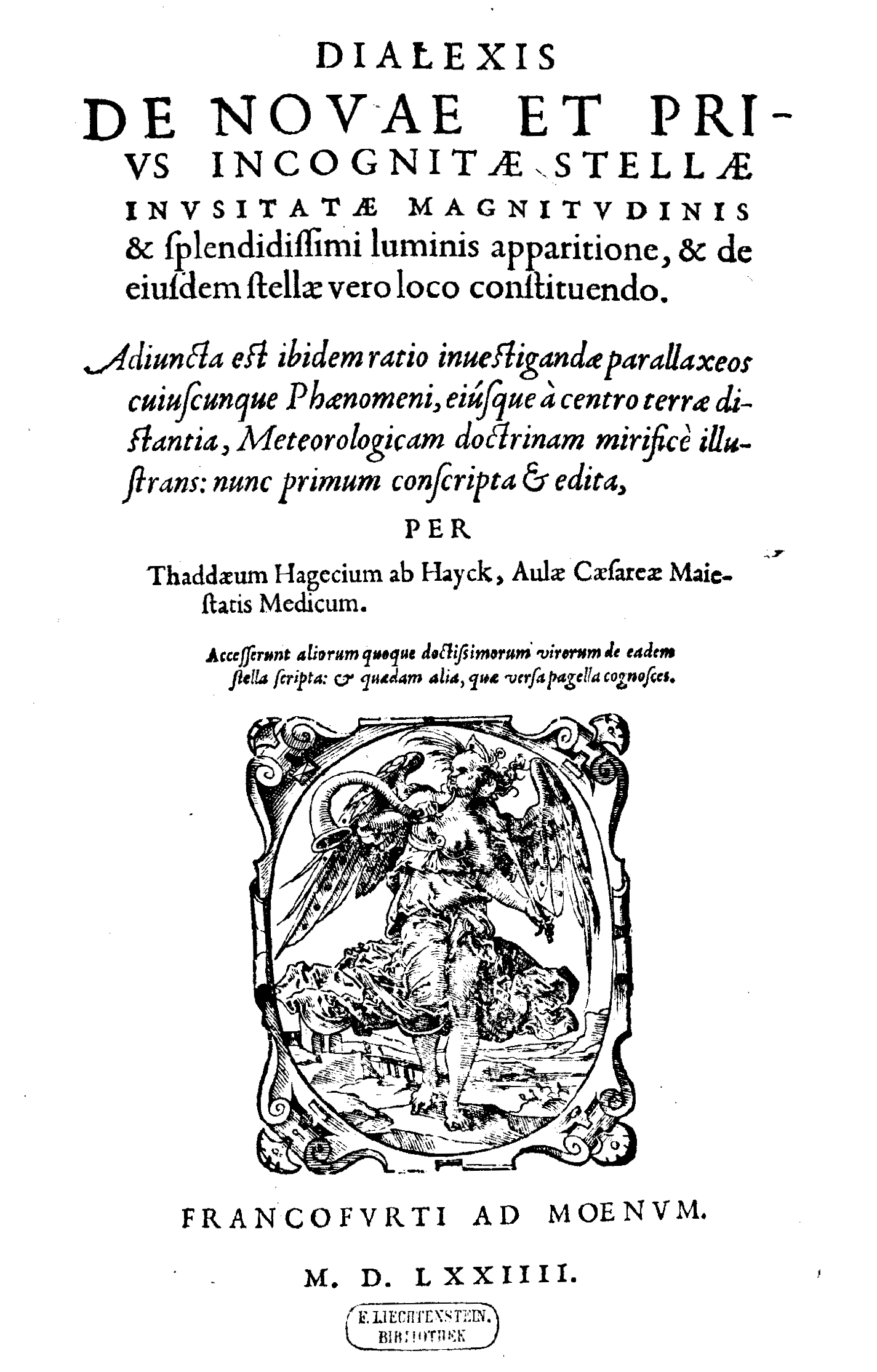
Dialexis de novae et prius incognitae stellae inusitatae magnitudinis et splendidissimi luminis apparitione, et de eiusdem stellae vero loco constituendo, 1574

Tadeáš Hájek was born on 1 December 1525 in Prague. He was the son of Šimon Hájek (c. 1485–1551) from an old Prague family. He was ennobled in 1554 by Ferdinand I of Germany, knighted in 1571 by Maximilian II, later made knight of the Holy Roman Empire by Rudolf II. He had three wives, three sons, and one daughter.

In 1548–1549, he studied medicine and astronomy in Vienna and graduated in 1550, receiving his Masters "in artibus" in 1551. In 1554 he studied medicine in Bologna and went to Milan the same year to listen to lectures by Girolamo Cardano, but he soon returned to Prague, where he became a professor of mathematics at the Charles University of Prague in 1555.

He published the Aphorismi Metoposcopici in 1561, dealing with divination and diagnosis by interpreting lines on the forehead. He triangulated the area around Prague and in 1563 co-authored a map of it, which is lost. In 1564 he received the Emperor's privilege stating that no astrological prognostication could be printed in Prague before he had seen and approved it. In 1566–1570, he served as an army doctor in the Habsburg monarchy and Hungary during the war with the Ottoman Empire. He published his studies of a supernova in the constellation Cassiopeia in 1572. Tadeáš Hájek was in frequent scientific correspondence with the recognized astronomer Tycho Brahe (1546–1601) and played an important role in persuading Rudolf II to invite Brahe (and later Kepler) to Prague.

His voluminous writings in Latin were mostly concerned with astronomy and many regarded him as the greatest astronomer of his time. Besides his work, Tadeáš Hájek eagerly collected manuscripts, especially those by Copernicus. Throughout his life he also published numerous astrological prognostics in Czech and that is why he was until recently viewed as an "occultist" rather than a great scientist. He corresponded with John Dee as a result of their common interest in Euclid and geometry.

He died on 1 September 1600 in Prague.

== Honours ==
The lunar crater Hagecius and the asteroid 1995 Hajek are named in his honour.

== Works ==
- Dialexis de novae et prius incognitae stellae inusitatae magnitudinis et splendidissimi luminis apparitione, et de eiusdem stellae vero loco constituendo (in Latin). Frankfurt am Main: Sigmund Feyerabend. 1574.
