= College and university rankings in the United States =

College and university rankings in the United States order the best U.S. colleges and universities based on factors that vary depending on the ranking. Rankings are typically conducted by magazines, newspapers, websites, governments, or academics. In addition to ranking entire institutions, specific programs, departments, and schools can be ranked. Some rankings consider measures of wealth, excellence in research, selective admissions, and alumni success. There is also much debate about rankings' interpretation, accuracy, and usefulness. College rankings in the United States began as early as 1911.

== Academic Influence rankings ==
Academic Influence's rankings of colleges, universities, and disciplinary programs began as a Defense Advanced Research Projects Agency (DARPA) initiative for ranking persons according to their areas of influence. By then associating influential people with their academic affiliations, Academic Influence was able to induce rankings of higher education institutions.

In ranking people and institutions by influence, Academic Influence uses a machine-learning technology implemented by its InfluenceRanking engine. As a consequence, all its influence-based rankings occur without human intervention but instead are algorithmically driven. Academic Influence thereby claims to produce college and university rankings that are not only objective and unbiased, but also non-gameable (features it argues should be present in school rankings but are largely absent from them).

In ranking undergraduate institutions, Academic Influence argues that the best metric for doing so is not influence per se but what it calls "concentrated influence," which normalizes influence by size of the undergraduate student body. The idea is that larger schools will naturally acquire more influence, and thus rank more highly, simply in virtue of their size. Concentrated influence, by controlling for size, attempts to correct for this imbalance.

Academic Influence's top schools for undergraduates as gauged by concentrated influence are as follows. Swarthmore appears not only in the best liberal arts ranking but also in the best overall ranking because even though it is much smaller than Duke or Northwestern, its concentrated influence, by controlling for size, makes it comparable to those schools. Note also that Caltech rises to the top of the best overall ranking because of its enormous influence in relation to its very small size for a research university (its undergraduate body is less than 1,000).

== Academic Ranking of World Universities ==
Among the three most watched global university rankings, the 2021 Academic Ranking of World Universities (ARWU) started in 2003, and is based upon objective third party data. In 2021, more than 2000 institutions were scrutinized, and the best 1000 universities in the world were ranked. Universities are ranked by several indicators of academic or research performance, including alumni and staff winning Nobel Prizes and Fields Medals, highly cited researchers, papers published in Nature and Science, papers indexed in major citation indices, and the per capita academic performance of an institution. Harvard and Stanford have topped the rankings for the last 11 years.

== Council for Aid to Education ==
The Council for Aid to Education publishes a list of the top universities in terms of annual fundraising. Fundraising ability reflects, among other things, alumni and outside donors' views of the quality of a university, as well as the ability of that university to expend funds on top faculty and facilities. 2017 rankings list the top 3 as Harvard, Stanford, and Cornell.

== Forbes college rankings ==
In 2008, Forbes began publishing an annual list of "America's Best Colleges." Alumni salary (self-reported salaries of alumni from PayScale and data from the College Scorecard) constitutes 20% of the score. Student debt loads (as reported by the College Scorecard) constitutes 15% of the score. Graduation Rates (both for all students and for recipients of Pell Grants) constitute 15% of the score. Career success gauges the leadership and entrepreneurial success of alumni in academia, government and various industries. It does not include salaries. It constitutes 15% of the score. Return on Investment divides the total net price of attending a college by the graduate premium received by alumni. It constitutes 15% of the score. The Retention Rate uses IPEDS data to measure the percentage of students who do not drop out after their first year. It constitutes 10% of the score. Academic success measures the number of recent graduates who have gone on to win Fulbright, Truman, Goldwater and Rhodes scholarships. It also uses data from the NCSES to determine the average number of alumni who earned a Ph.D. over the previous three years. It constitutes 10% of the score. Public reputation is not considered, which causes some colleges to score lower than in other lists. A three-year moving average is used to smooth out the scoring.

Forbes rated Princeton the country's best college in its inaugural (2008) list. West Point took the top honor the following year. Williams College was ranked first both in 2010 and 2011, and Princeton returned to the top spot in 2012. In 2013 and 2016, Stanford occupied the No. 1 spot, with elite liberal arts schools Williams and Pomona College topping the rankings in the intervening years. From 2017 to 2019, the magazine has ranked Harvard as the best college in America. In 2021, University of California, Berkeley topped the ranking, becoming the first public school to do so. In 2024, Forbes began a new rankings list called the "New Ivies," universities it says "employers love."

== Niche rankings ==
Niche's Best Colleges ranking focuses on academics, diversity, affordability, and student satisfaction.

== The Princeton Review Dream Colleges ==
The Princeton Review annually asks students and parents what their dream college is, if cost and ability to get in were not factors.

== Revealed preference rankings ==
Several entities have attempted to rank the desirability of U.S. colleges and universities by analyzing datasets of the enrollment decisions of students admitted to multiple institutions, applying choice modelling to their revealed preferences. In this methodology, schools that are chosen more frequently, particularly over other frequently chosen schools, are given more points in an Elo rating system to create the ranking. It can also be used to estimate the likelihood that a student admitted to two different schools will choose one over the other.

The technique was pioneered by Christopher N. Avery et al. using data from 1999. Since 2009, the digital credential service Parchment has published an annual revealed preference ranking using its own data. The New York Times and others have noted that this approach highlights colleges with a distinct focus, which tend to fare well under it.

== Social Mobility Index (SMI) rankings ==
The SMI rankings are a collaborative publication from CollegeNet and PayScale. The rankings aim to provide a measure of the extent to which colleges provide upward economic mobility to those that attend. The rankings were created in response to the finding in Science magazine which showed that among developed nations, the United States now provides the least economic opportunity and mobility for its citizens. The rankings were also created to combat the rising costs of tuition, much of which is attributed to the efforts of some colleges to increase their own fame and wealth in ways that increase their rank in media periodicals that put an emphasis on such measures. In 2014, according to the SMI, the top five colleges are Montana Tech, Rowan University, Florida A&M, Cal Poly Pomona, and Cal State Northridge.

== The Top American Research Universities ==
The Center for Measuring University Performance has ranked American research universities in the Top American Research Universities since 2000. The methodology is based on data such as research publications, citations, recognitions and funding, as well as undergraduate quality such as SAT scores. The information used can be found in publicly accessible materials, reducing possibilities for manipulation. The methodology is generally consistent from year to year and changes are explained in the publication along with references from other studies.

== U.S. News & World Report Best Colleges Ranking ==
U.S. News & World Report Best Colleges Ranking is an annual set of rankings of colleges and universities in the United States, which was first published by U.S. News & World Report in 1983. It has been described as the most influential institutional ranking in the country.

The Best Colleges rankings have raised controversy, and they have been denounced by several education experts. Detractors argue that they rely on self-reported, sometimes fraudulent data by the institutions, encourage gamesmanship by institutions looking to improve their rank, imply a false precision by deriving an ordinal ranking from questionable data, contribute to the admissions frenzy by unduly highlighting prestige, and ignore individual fit by comparing institutions with widely diverging missions on the same scale.

== The Wall Street Journal College Rankings ==
The Wall Street Journal together with Times Higher Education together release an annual ranking of U.S. colleges and universities. The ranking includes performance indicators such as teaching resources, academic reputation, and postgraduate prospects. By 2023, The Wall Street Journal collaborated with College Pulse in its annual rankings.

== Washington Monthly Rankings ==
Washington Monthly's rankings began as a research report in 2005, with rankings appearing in the September 2006 issue.

== "What will they Learn?" Report – American Council of Trustees and Alumni ==
In 2009, the American Council of Trustees and Alumni (ACTA) began grading colleges and universities based on the strength of their general education requirements. In ACTA's annual What Will They Learn? report, colleges and universities are assigned a letter grade from "A" to "F" based on how many of seven subjects are required of students. The seven subjects are composition, mathematics, foreign language, science, economics, literature and American government or history. The 2011–2012 edition of What Will They Learn? graded 1,007 institutions. In the 2011–2012 edition, 19 schools received an "A" grade for requiring at least six of the subjects the study evaluated. ACTA's rating system has been endorsed by Mel Elfin, founding editor of U.S. News & World Report's rankings. The New York Times higher education blogger Stanley Fish, while agreeing that universities ought to have a strong core curriculum, disagreed with some of the subjects ACTA includes in the core.

== Income-based listings ==
The College Scorecard, published online by the United States Department of Education, allows readers to generate custom rankings by location, graduation rate, cost, and financial outcomes after graduation.

Using data from the College Scorecard, researchers at Georgetown University calculated the return on investment, taking into account the cost of an institution vs. observed increase in earnings among attendees (including those who did and did not graduate with a diploma).

== Other rankings ==
Other rankings include the Fiske Guide to Colleges, Money, and Business Insider. Many specialized rankings are available in guidebooks, considering individual student interests, fields of study, geographical location, and affordability. In addition to best overall colleges ranking shown above, Niche also publishes dozens of specialized rankings such as Best Academics, Best Campus Food, Most Conservative Colleges, and Best Technology.

Among the rankings dealing with individual fields of study is the Philosophical Gourmet Report or "Leiter Report", a ranking of philosophy departments. This report has attracted criticism from different viewpoints. Notably, practitioners of continental philosophy, who perceive the Leiter report as unfair to their field, have compiled alternative rankings.

The Gourman Report, last published in 1996, ranked the quality of undergraduate majors and graduate programs. The Daily Beast has also, in the past, published rankings. In 2015, The Economist published a one-time ranking emphasizing the difference between the expected and actual earnings of alumni, as The Economist List of America's Best Colleges.

The Higher Education Rankings, developed and managed by the New York City consulting company IV Research, is a commercial product that provides both general rankings as well as personalized rankings based on a complicated assessment of 6 criteria and 30 indicators.

Gallup polls ask American adults, "All in all, what would you say is the best college or university in the United States?"

Global Language Monitor produces a "TrendTopper MediaBuzz" ranking of the Top 300 United States colleges and universities semi-annually. It publishes overall results for both university and college categories. It uses the Carnegie Foundation for the Advancement of Teaching's classifications to distinguish between universities and liberal arts colleges. The rankings list 125 universities, 100 colleges, the change in the rankings over time, a "Predictive Quantities Indicator" (PQI) Index number (for relative rankings), rankings by Momentum (yearly and 90-day snapshots), and rankings by State. The most recent ranking appeared on November 1, 2009, covering 2008. The PQI index is produced by Global Language Monitor's proprietary PQI algorithm, which has been criticized by some linguists for its use in a counting of the total number of English words. The Global Language Monitor also sells the TrendTopper MediaBuzz Reputation Management solution for higher education for which "colleges and universities can enhance their standings among peers". The Global Language Monitor states that it "does not influence the Higher Education rankings in any way".

The Princeton Review annually publishes a book of Best Colleges. In 2011, this was titled The Best 373 Colleges. Phi Beta Kappa has also sought to establish chapters at the best schools, lately numbering 280.

In terms of collegiate sports programs, the annual NACDA Directors' Cup provides a measure of all-around collegiate athletic team achievement. Stanford won the Division I Directors' Cup 25 years in a row (the 1994-5 through 2018–9 academic years), and the University of Texas at Austin has won the two Cups awarded since the end of Stanford's streak.

== Criticisms ==
American college and university ranking systems have drawn criticism from within and outside higher education in Canada and the United States. Institutions that have objected include Reed College, Alma College, Mount Holyoke College, St. John's College, Earlham College, MIT, Stanford University, University of Western Ontario, and Queen's University.

Some higher education experts, like Kevin Carey of Education Sector, have argued that U.S. News & World Report's college rankings system is merely a list of criteria that mirrors the superficial characteristics of elite colleges and universities. According to Carey, "[The] U.S. News ranking system is deeply flawed. Instead of focusing on the fundamental issues of how well colleges and universities educate their students and how well they prepare them to be successful after college, the magazine's rankings are almost entirely a function of three factors: fame, wealth, and exclusivity." He suggested more important characteristics are how well students are learning and how likely students are to earn a degree.

=== 2007 movement ===
On 19 June 2007, during the annual meeting of the Annapolis Group, members discussed a letter to college presidents asking them not to participate in the "reputation survey" section of the U.S. News survey (this section comprises 25% of the ranking). As a result, "a majority of the approximately 80 presidents at the meeting said that they did not intend to participate in the U.S. News reputational rankings in the future." However, the decision to fill out the reputational survey was left to each individual college. The statement stated that its members "have agreed to participate in the development of an alternative common format that presents information about their colleges for students and their families to use in the college search process." This database was outlined and developed in conjunction with higher education organizations including the National Association of Independent Colleges and Universities and the Council of Independent Colleges.

U.S. News & World Report editor Robert Morse issued a response on 22 June 2007, stating:

"in terms of the peer assessment survey, we at U.S. News firmly believe the survey has significant value because it allows us to measure the "intangibles" of a college that we can't measure through statistical data. Plus, the reputation of a school can help get that all-important first job and plays a key part in which grad school someone will be able to get into. The peer survey is by nature subjective, but the technique of asking industry leaders to rate their competitors is a commonly accepted practice. The results from the peer survey also can act to level the playing field between private and public colleges."

In reference to the alternative database discussed by the Annapolis Group, Morse argued:

"It's important to point out that the Annapolis Group's stated goal of presenting college data in a common format has been tried before ... U.S. News has been supplying this exact college information for many years already. And it appears that NAICU will be doing it with significantly less comparability and functionality.U.S. News first collects all these data (using an agreed-upon set of definitions from the Common Data Set). Then we post the data on our website in easily accessible, comparable tables. In other words, the Annapolis Group and the others in the NAICU initiative actually are following the lead of U.S. News."

In 1996, according to Gerhard Casper, then-president of Stanford University, U.S. News & World Report changed its formula to calculated financial resources:

Knowing that universities—and, in most cases, the statistics they submit—change little from one year to the next, I can only conclude that what are changing are the formulas the magazine's number massagers employ. And, indeed, there is marked evidence of that this year. In the category "Faculty resources," even though few of us had significant changes in our faculty or student numbers, our class sizes, or our finances, the rankings' producers created a mad scramble in rank order [... data ...]. Then there is "Financial resources," where Stanford dropped from #6 to #9, Harvard from #5 to #7. Our resources did not fall; did other institutions' rise so sharply? I infer that, in each case, the formulas were simply changed, with notification to no one, not even your readers, who are left to assume that some schools have suddenly soared, others precipitously plummeted.

== See also ==
- College admissions in the United States
- University and College Accountability Network
