= Gowadia =

Gowadia is an Indian surname. Notable people with the surname include:

- Huban A. Gowadia (born c. 1969), American transportation engineer and government official
- Noshir Gowadia (born 1944), Indian design engineer and spy
