= Susan Gardner =

Susan Gardner is the name of the following persons:

- Sue Gardner, Canadian journalist
- Susan C. Gardner, Mexican-American marine scientist
