= Harvard Kennedy School =

Public policy school of Harvard University

John F. Kennedy School of Government
- Coat of arms
- Motto: Ask what you can do
- Type: Private nonprofit public policy school
- Established: 1936; 90 years ago
- Parent institution: Harvard University
- Endowment: $1.7 billion (2021)
- Dean: Jeremy M. Weinstein
- Academic staff: 250
- Postgraduates: 1,100
- Location: Cambridge, Massachusetts, U.S. 42°22′17″N 71°07′19″W
- Campus: Urban
- Website: hks.harvard.edu

The John F. Kennedy School of Government, commonly called the Harvard Kennedy School (HKS), is the graduate school of public policy of Harvard University, a private Ivy League research university in Cambridge, Massachusetts, United States.

The Harvard Kennedy School offers master's degrees in public policy, public administration, and international development, four doctoral degrees, and various executive education programs. It conducts research in subjects relating to politics, government, international affairs, and economics. As of 2021, the Harvard Kennedy School has an endowment of $1.7 billion. It is a member of the Association of Professional Schools of International Affairs (APSIA), a global consortium of schools that trains leaders in international affairs.

The primary campus of the Harvard Kennedy School is on John F. Kennedy Street in Cambridge. The main buildings overlook the Charles River and are southwest of Harvard Yard and Harvard Square, on the site of a former MBTA Red Line train yard. The School is adjacent to the public riverfront John F. Kennedy Memorial Park.

Considered the world's premier leadership and public policy school, Harvard Kennedy School alumni includes 21 heads of state or government and hundreds of cabinet officials, military leaders, heads of central banks, and legislators.

== History ==
Harvard Kennedy School buildings

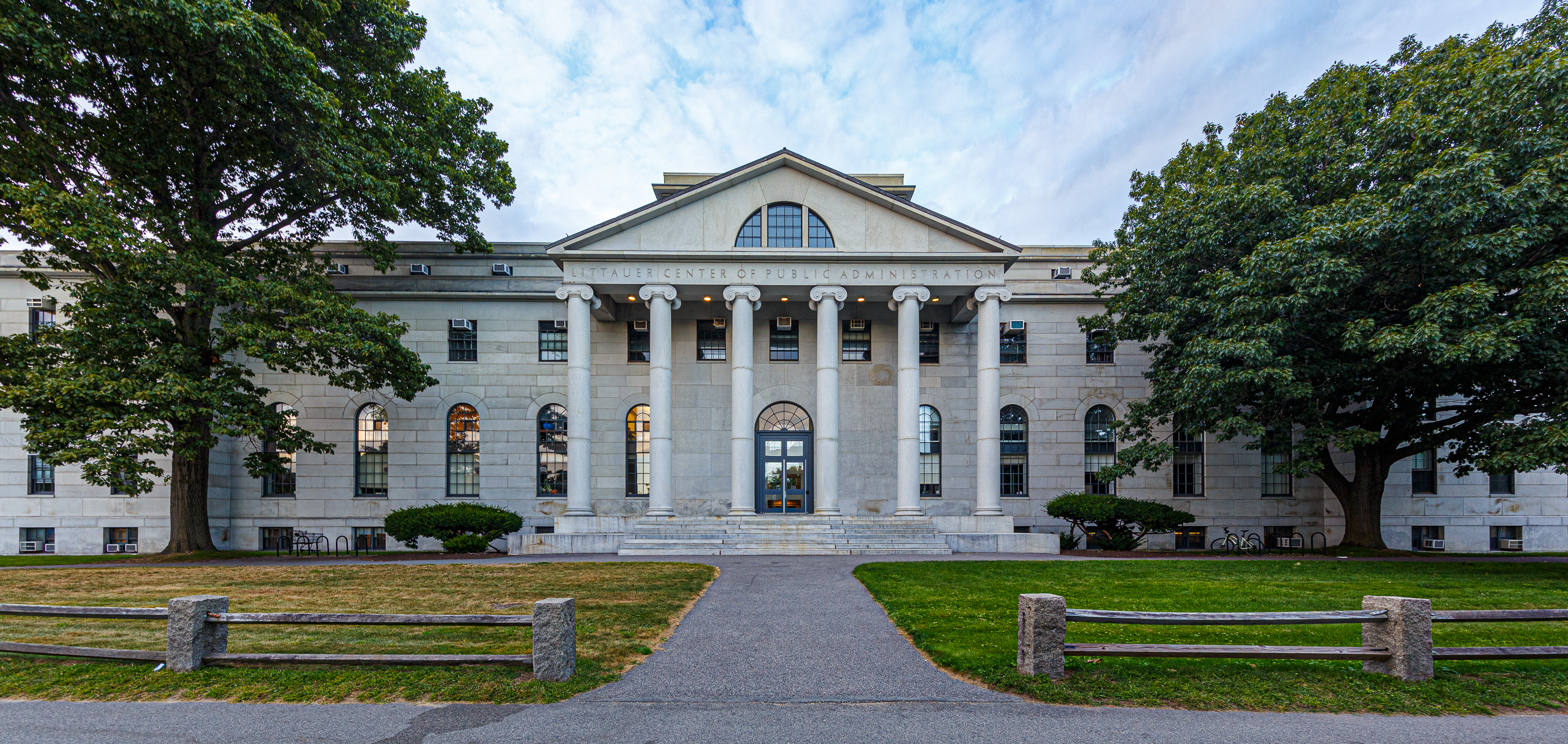
The Littauer Center at Harvard University, the original home of Harvard Kennedy School from 1936 to 1978

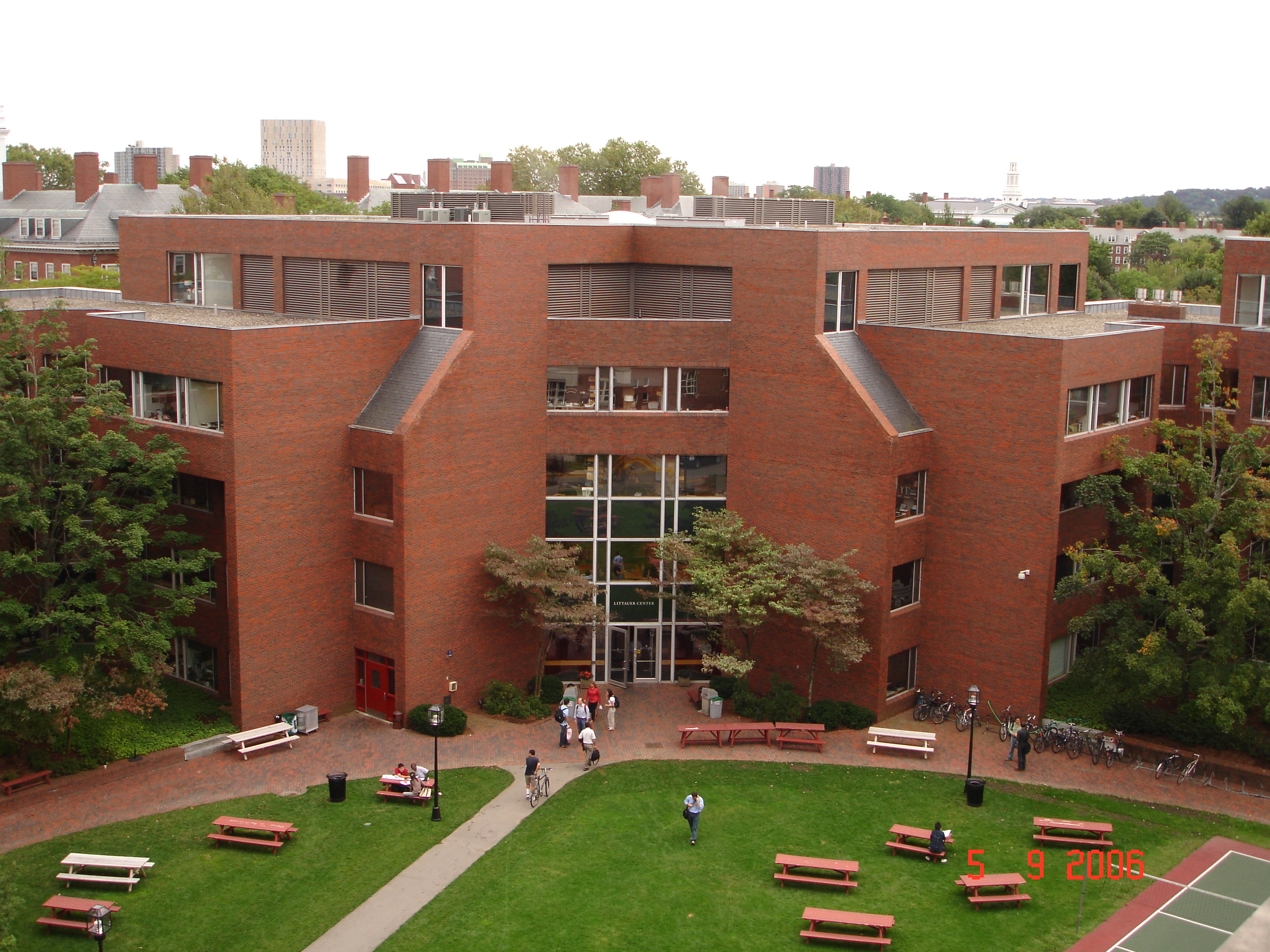
The new Littauer Center, built 1978

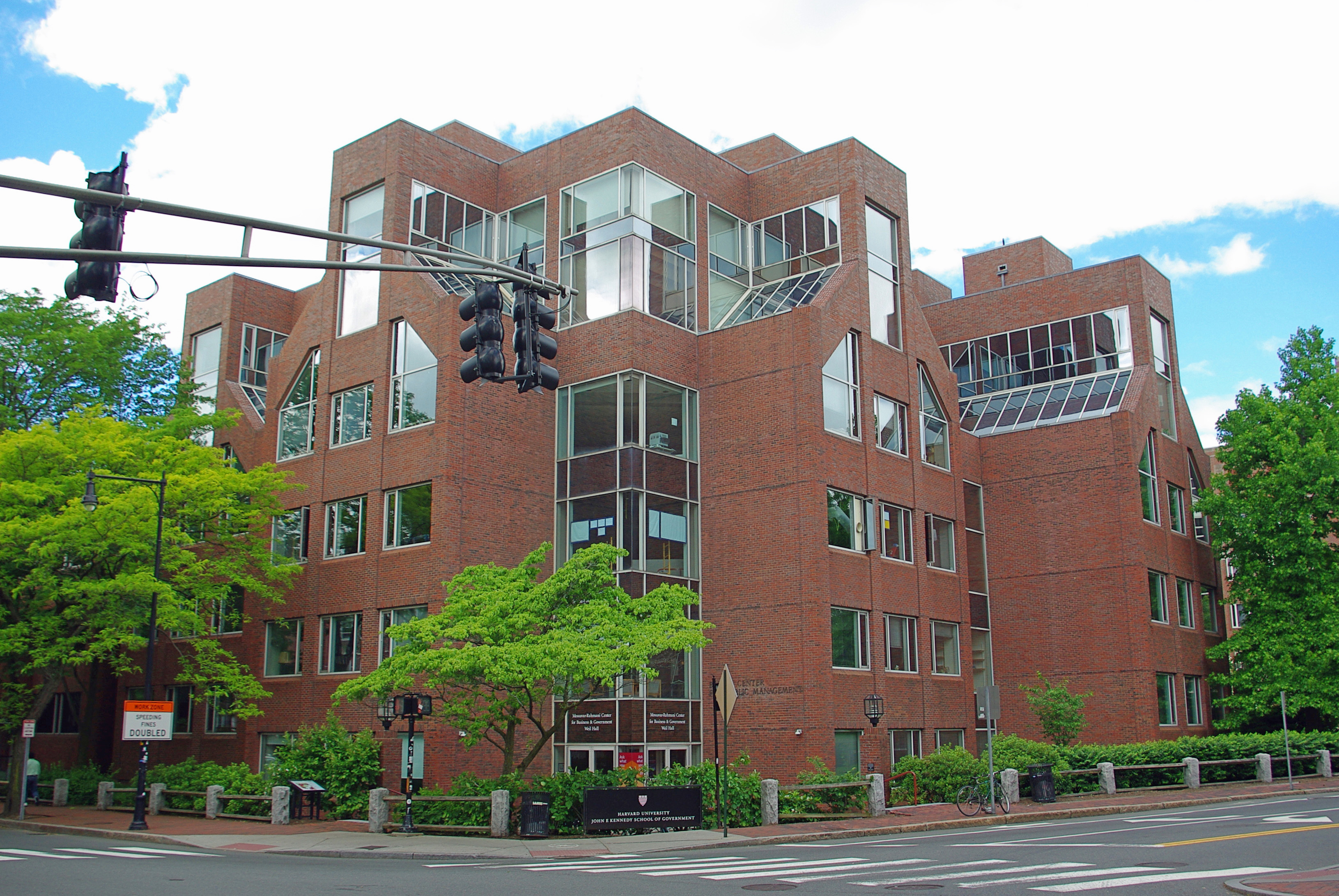
Belfer Building

=== Founding ===
The Harvard Kennedy School was founded as the Harvard Graduate School of Public Administration in 1936 with a $2 million gift (equivalent to roughly $43 million as of 2023) from Lucius Littauer, an 1878 Harvard College alumnus, businessman, former U.S. Congressman, and the first coach of the Harvard Crimson football team.

The Harvard Kennedy School's shield was designed to express the national purpose of the school and was modeled after the U.S. shield. The School drew its initial faculty from Harvard's existing government and economics departments, and welcomed its first students in 1937.

The School's original home was in the Littauer Center, north of Harvard Yard, which is now home to Harvard University's Economics Department. The first students at the Graduate School were called Littauer Fellows, participating in a one-year course listing which later developed into the school's mid-career Master in Public Administration program. In the 1960s, the School began to develop its current public policy degree and course curriculum associated with its Master in Public Policy program.

=== Renaming and move ===
In 1966, three years following the assassination of U.S. president and 1940 Harvard College alumnus John F. Kennedy, the school was renamed in his honor. (Note: The full name of the upon the change was the John Fitzgerald Kennedy School of Government. It was subsequently usually referred to as the John F. Kennedy School of Government or, in shorter form, as the Kennedy School of Government.)

In 1966, concurrent with the school's renaming, the Harvard Institute of Politics was created with Neustadt as its founding director. The Harvard Institute of Politics has been housed on the school campus since 1978, and today sponsors and hosts a series of programs, speeches and study groups for Harvard undergraduates and graduate students. Along with major Harvard Kennedy School events, the Institute of Politics holds the John F. Kennedy Jr. Forum, named in honor of John F. Kennedy Jr., in Harvard Kennedy School's Littauer Building.

By 1978, the faculty, including presidential scholar and adviser Richard Neustadt, a foreign policy scholar and later dean of the School, Graham Allison, Richard Zeckhauser, and others consolidated the school's programs and research centers at the present Harvard Kennedy School campus. The first new building opened on the southern half of the former Eliot Shops site in October 1978. Under the terms of Littauer's original grant, the current campus also features a building called Littauer.

=== Rebranding and campus expansion ===
In late 2007, the Kennedy School of Government announced that while its official name was not being altered, it was rebranding itself as Harvard Kennedy School effective Fall 2008. The goal was to make clearer the school's connection with Harvard. It was also thought that the new branding would reduce confusion with other entities named after Kennedy, including the Kennedy Center in Washington, D.C. and the Kennedy Library in Boston. The rebranding had the support of John F. Kennedy's brother, U.S. Senator Edward M. Kennedy, and Caroline Kennedy, the former president's daughter.

In 2012, the Harvard Kennedy School announced a $500 million fundraising campaign, $120 million of which was to be used to significantly expand the Harvard Kennedy School campus, adding 91,000 square feet of space including six new classrooms, a new kitchen, and dining facility, offices and meeting spaces, a new student lounge and study space, more collaboration and active learning spaces, and a redesigned central courtyard. Groundbreaking commenced on May 7, 2015, and the project was completed in late 2017. The new Harvard Kennedy School campus opened in December 2017.

From 2004 to 2015, the Harvard Kennedy School's dean was David T. Ellwood, a U.S. Department of Health and Human Services official in the Bill Clinton administration.

In 2015, Douglas Elmendorf, a former director of the U.S. Congressional Budget Office, was named both dean of the Harvard Kennedy School and the school's Don K. Price Professor of Public Policy. Elmendorf announced in September 2023 that he would step down as dean at the end of the academic year 2023/2024.

In July 2024, Jeremy M. Weinstein, a political scientist at Stanford University and former chief of staff to the U.S. ambassador to the United Nations, succeeded Elmendorf as dean.

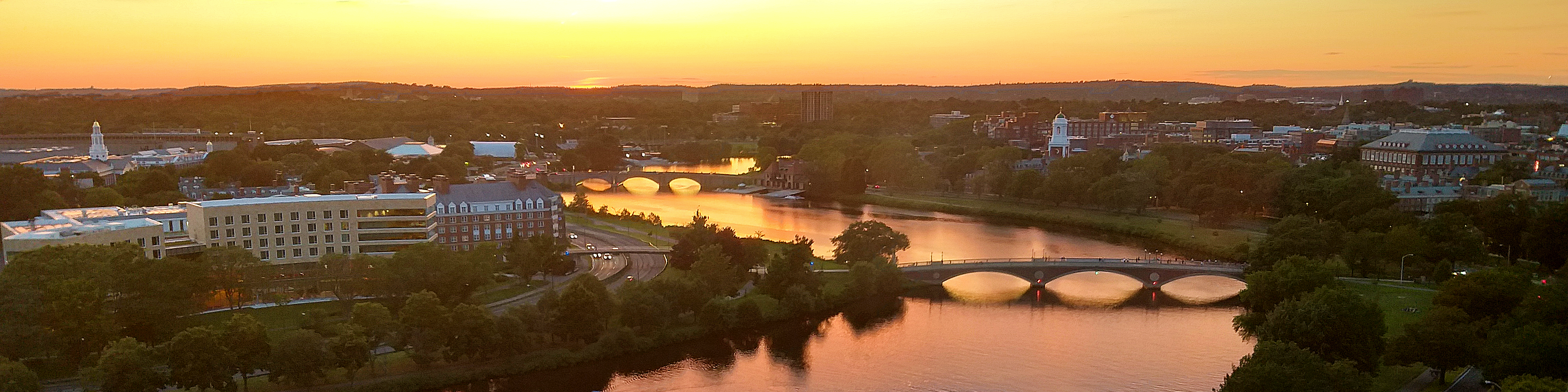
Weeks Footbridge crossing the Charles River at sunset with Harvard Business School on the left and Harvard Kennedy School on the right

== Academics ==
=== Degrees ===
The Harvard Kennedy School offers four master's degree programs. The two-year Master in Public Policy (MPP) program focuses on policy analysis, economics, management, ethics, statistics and negotiations in the public sector. There are three separate Master in Public Administration (MPA) programs: a one-year Mid-Career Program (MC/MPA) intended for professionals who are more than seven years removed from their college graduation; a two-year MPA program intended for professionals who have an additional graduate degree and are more recently out of school; and a two-year international development track (MPA/ID) focused on development studies with a strong emphasis on economics and quantitative analysis.

Members of the mid-career MPA class also include Mason Fellows, who are public and private executives from developing countries. Mason Fellows typically constitute about 50 percent of the incoming class of Mid-Career MPA candidates. The Mason cohort is the most diverse at Harvard in terms of nationalities and ethnicities represented. It is named after Edward Sagendorph Mason, the former Harvard professor who, from 1947 to 1958, was dean of Harvard's Graduate School of Public Administration, now known as Harvard Kennedy School.

In addition to the master's programs, the Harvard Kennedy School administers three doctoral programs. Ph.D. degrees are awarded in public policy, in social policy in conjunction with Harvard's departments of government and sociology, and in health policy in conjunction with FAS and the Harvard School of Public Health.

==== Joint and concurrent degrees ====
The Harvard Kennedy School has a number of joint and concurrent degree programs within Harvard and with other leading universities, which allow students to receive multiple degrees in a reduced period of time. Joint and current students spend at least one year in residence in Cambridge taking courses. The Harvard Kennedy School joint degree programs are run with the Harvard Business School, the Harvard Law School, and the Harvard Graduate School of Design, and concurrent programs are offered with the Harvard Divinity School and the Harvard Medical School.

Beyond Harvard, the Harvard Kennedy School has concurrent degree arrangements with other law, business, and medical schools, including the Stanford Graduate School of Business; the MIT Sloan School of Management; the Tuck School of Business at Dartmouth College; The Wharton School of the University of Pennsylvania; the Columbia Law School; the Duke University School of Law; the Georgetown University Law Center; the New York University School of Law, the Northwestern University School of Law; the Stanford Law School; the University of California, Berkeley School of Law; the University of Michigan Law School; the University of Pennsylvania Law School; the Yale Law School; and the UCSF School of Medicine.

Abroad, the Harvard Kennedy School offers a dual degree with the Graduate Institute of International and Development Studies in Geneva.

=== HKS courses ===
The Harvard Kennedy School maintains six academic divisions each headed by a faculty chair. In addition to offerings in the Harvard Kennedy School course listing, students are eligible to cross-register for courses at the other graduate and professional schools at Harvard and at MIT Sloan School of Management, Fletcher School at Tufts University, and the MIT School of Architecture and Planning. MPP coursework is focused on one of five areas, called a Policy Area of Concentration (PAC), and includes a year-long research seminar in their second year, which includes a master's thesis called a Policy Analysis Exercise.

=== International collaboration ===
The university is an active member of the University of the Arctic. UArctic is an international cooperative network based in the Circumpolar Arctic region, consisting of more than 200 universities, colleges, and other organizations with an interest in promoting education and research in the Arctic region.

== Rankings ==
HKS rankings

Global
Foreign Policy – PhD	1
Foreign Policy – Master's	3
QS – Politics	1

United States
U.S. News & World Report – Public Affairs	3

The Harvard Kennedy School has routinely ranked as the best, or among the best, of the world's public policy graduate schools. U.S. News & World Report ranks it the best graduate school for social policy, the best for health policy, and second best for public policy analysis. In 2015 rankings, the Harvard Kennedy School is ranked first in the subcategory of health policy and second in the category of public policy analysis and social policy.

The Harvard Kennedy School's foreign affairs programs have consistently ranked at the top or near the top of Foreign Policy magazine's Inside the Ivory Tower survey, which lists the world's top twenty academic international relations programs at the undergraduate, Master's, and Ph.D. levels. In 2012, for example, the survey ranked the Harvard Kennedy School first overall for doctoral and undergraduate programs and third overall in the Master's category.

== Student organizations ==
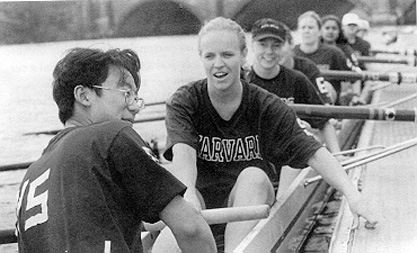
The Harvard Kennedy School's women's rowing team at Weld Boathouse in the Head of the Charles Regatta rowing race on Charles River in 2006

The Harvard Kennedy School maintains a range of student activities, including interest-driven student caucuses, Kennedy School Student Government, known as KSSG, student-edited policy journals, including Harvard Journal of Hispanic Policy, Kennedy School Review, the Journal of Middle Eastern Politics and Policy, a student newspaper, The Citizen, and a number of student athletic groups.

Students can join the Harvard Graduate Council, which is the centralized student government for the twelve graduate and professional schools of Harvard University. The Harvard Graduate Council is responsible for advocating student concerns to central administrators, including the president of Harvard University, provost, deans of students, and deans for the nearly 15,000 graduate and professional students across the twelve schools, organizing large university-wide initiatives and events, administering and providing funding for university-wide student groups, and representing the Harvard graduate student population to other universities and external organizations. Harvard Graduate Council is known for spearheading the "One Harvard" movement, which aims to bring all of Harvard's graduate schools together through closer collaboration and social interaction.

== Past HKS Student Body Presidents ==
Presidents of the Kennedy School Student Government have included:

- 2026–2027: Xinyi Tong
- 2025–2026: Jerwin Tiu.
- 2024–2025: Zubair Merchant.
- 2023–2024: NanaEfua Afoh-Manin.
- 2022–2023: Sam Yoon.
- 2021–2022: Jaylen Hackett.
- 2020–2021: Diego Garcia Blum.
- 2019–2020: Charlene Wang.
- 2018–2019: Philip Johnston.
- 2017–2018: Gessika Innocent.
- 2016–2017: Arohi Sharma.
- 2015–2016: Pitichoke Chulapamornsri.
- 2014–2015: Allister Chang.
- 2013–2014: Jieun Baek.
- 2012–2013: Rohit Malhotra.
- 2011–2012: Sherry Hakimi.
- 2010–2011: Imran Alimohammed.
- 2009–2010: David Baumwoll.
- 2008–2009: Benjamin Polk.

== Centers ==
The Harvard Kennedy School is home to 14 centers, including:

- Ash Center for Democratic Governance and Innovation
- Belfer Center for Science and International Affairs
- Bloomberg Center for Cities at Harvard University
- Carr Center for Human Rights Policy
- Center for International Development
- Center for Public Leadership
- Edmond & Lily Safra Center for Ethics
- Institute of Politics
- Joint Center for Housing Studies
- Shorenstein Center on Media, Politics and Public Policy
- Mossavar Rahmani Center for Business and Government
- Rappaport Institute for Greater Boston
- Taubman Center for State and Local Government
- Malcolm Wiener Center for Social Policy
- Women and Public Policy Program

The majority of centers offer research and academic fellowships through which fellows can engage in research projects, lead study groups into specific topics and share their experiences with industry and government with the student body.

== Controversies ==
Under Dean Elmendorf, the school has tried to focus its engagement across the political spectrum, which has caused controversy at times. The school came under criticism for offering a fellowship to Chelsea Manning on September 13, 2017. It then publicly rescinded the offer on September 15, 2017, after CIA director Mike Pompeo canceled a speaking engagement at Harvard and sent a letter condemning the university for awarding the fellowship.

An investigative report in 2021 by student group Fossil Fuel Divest Harvard found that many of the centers' climate initiatives were funded in part by fossil fuel companies, and that some of the centers had allegedly taken several steps to cover up that fact.

The Kennedy School's Carr Center for Human Rights Policy in 2022 invited Kenneth Roth, former executive director of Human Rights Watch, a leading global human rights organizations, to join it as a senior fellow. The Kennedy School eventually rescinded the invitation to Roth because Human Rights Watch's 2021 investigation of Israel's treatment of Palestinians concluded that it met the threshold for the "crime of apartheid". After condemnation by faculty, students, the American Civil Liberties Union and others, the dean of the school reversed this decision.

In 2026, the school was declared an undesirable organization in Russia.

== Awards ==
The Robert F. Kennedy Award for Excellence in Public Service is awarded to "a graduating student whose commitment, activities, and contributions to public service are extraordinary". Several other awards are also awarded on Class Day annually at the end of May.

== Notable alumni ==
The Harvard Kennedy School has over 63,000 alumni, many of whom have gone on to notable careers around the world in government, business, public policy, and other fields. Its alumni include 20 heads of state and dozens of leaders of government department and agencies, non-profit public policy organizations, the military, thought leadership and advocacy, academia, and other fields:

=== Government and politics ===
==== Heads of government and state ====
- Felipe Calderón (MPA '00), former president of Mexico
- Miguel de la Madrid (MPA '65), former president of Mexico
- Carlos Salinas de Gortari (MPA '73, PhD '76), former president of Mexico
- Tsakhiagiin Elbegdorj (MPA '02), former president and prime minister of Mongolia
- Luvsannamsrain Oyun-Erdene (MPA ‘15), former prime minister of Mongolia
- Abdiweli Gaas (MPA '99), former prime minister of Somalia
- John Haglelgam (MPA '93), former president of the Federated States of Micronesia
- Lee Hsien Loong (MPA '80), former prime minister of Singapore
- Daniel Noboa (MCMPA '20), current president of Ecuador
- Tharman Shanmugaratnam (MPA '89), current president of Singapore
- José María Figueres Olsen (MPA '91), former president of Costa Rica and former World Economic Forum CEO
- Maia Sandu (MPA '10), current president and former prime minister of Moldova
- Juan Manuel Santos (MPA '81), former president of Colombia and Nobel Peace Prize laureate
- Ellen Johnson Sirleaf (MPA '71), former president of Liberia and Nobel Peace Prize laureate
- Frederick Sumaye (MPA '07), former prime minister of Tanzania
- Tshering Tobgay (MPA '04), former prime minister and current leader of People's Democratic Party in Bhutan
- Pierre Trudeau (MA '45), former prime minister of Canada
- Donald Tsang (MPA '82), former Chief Executive of Hong Kong
- Morgan Tsvangirai ('02), former prime minister of Zimbabwe
- Eduardo Rodríguez Veltzé (MPA '88), former president of Bolivia
- Jamil Mahuad Witt (MPA '89), former president of Ecuador
- Lawrence Wong (MPA '04), current prime minister of Singapore

==== Government administrators and officials ====
- Rizwan Ahmed (MPA), former Maritime Secretary of Pakistan
- Sartaj Aziz (MNA), served in several Ministerial positions in Pakistan
- Tariq Bajwa (MPA), former Finance Secretary of Pakistan
- Nisrin Barwari (MPA '99), former Minister of Municipalities and Public Works of Iraq
- Gankhuurai Battungalag, Director General of the Department for Europe of the Ministry of Foreign Affairs of Mongolia
- Charles Blanchard (MPP '85), former General Counsel of the Army and General Counsel of the Air Force
- J. Richard Blankenship (MPA '08), former U.S. ambassador to The Bahamas
- André Boisclair (MPA '05), former leader of Parti Québécois and former Minister of Citizenship and Immigration of Quebec, Canada
- Nick Boles (MPP '89), former Member of Parliament for Grantham and Stamford and former director of Policy Exchange in the United Kingdom
- Emilia Boncodin (MPA '86), former Secretary of Budget and Management for the Philippines
- Anna Escobedo Cabral (MPA '90), former Treasurer of the United States
- Piper Campbell (MPA '99), former U.S. ambassador to Mongolia and Chargé d'affaires ad interim at the U.S. Mission to the Association of Southeast Asian Nations
- Rajkumar Chellaraj (MPA '86), former U.S. Assistant Secretary of State for Administration
- Frank Chikane (MPA '95), member, African National Congress and advisor to President of South Africa
- Aneesh Chopra (MPP '97), former U.S. Chief Technology Officer
- Albert Chua (MPA '00), former Permanent Representative of Singapore to the United Nations
- Henry Cisneros (MPA '73), former U.S. Secretary of Housing and Urban Development
- Mark Daly (MPA, '11), member, Ireland's Seanad Éireann
- Božidar Đelić (MPA '91), former deputy prime minister of Serbia and Minister of Finance of Serbia
- Stephen Donnelly (MPA '08), Ireland Minister of Health and member, Teachta Dála, representing Wicklow
- Shaun Donovan (MPA '95), former U.S. Secretary of Housing and Urban Development and Office of Management and Budget director
- Theodore L. Eliot Jr. (MPA '56), former U.S. ambassador to Afghanistan
- Robert S. Gelbard (MPA '79), former U.S. ambassador to Indonesia and Bolivia
- Héctor Gramajo (MPA '95), former Defense Minister of Guatemala
- Yoshimasa Hayashi (MPA '94), Minister for Foreign Affairs of Japan
- Liu He (MPA '95), Vice Premier of the People's Republic of China
- Teo Chee Hean (MPA '86), Coordinating Minister for National Security for Singapore
- Pete Hegseth (MPP '13), current United States Secretary of Defense
- Keith Hennessey (MPP '94), former National Economic Council director
- Rafael Hui (MPA '83), former Chief Secretary for Administration of Hong Kong
- Muhammad Ibrahim (MPA '93), former Central Bank of Malaysia governor
- Natalie Jaresko (MPP '89), former Ukrainian Minister of Finance
- Vuk Jeremić (MPA '03), former president of the United Nations General Assembly and former Minister of Foreign Affairs for Serbia
- Ajay Narayan Jha, former Indian Administrative Service officer, former Expenditure Secretary, and former Finance Secretary of India
- Mitzi Johnson (MPA '13), former Speaker of the Vermont House of Representatives
- Daniel J. Jones, lead investigator for U.S. Senate Intelligence Committee report on CIA Torture
- Phillip Jones (MPA '21), Politician, Mayor of Newport News, Virginia
- Lim Hng Kiang (MPA '85), former Minister for Trade and Industry of Singapore
- Ban Ki-moon (MPA '84), former Secretary-General of the United Nations and former Minister of Foreign Affairs of South Korea
- Raymond Kelly (MPA '84), New York City Police Commissioner
- Rajive Kumar (MPA), Indian Administrative Service officer and former Chief Secretary of Government of Uttar Pradesh in India
- Andrew Leigh (PhD '04), Assistant Minister for Competition, Charities and Treasury for Australia and former Australian House of Representatives member
- Pita Limjaroenrat (MPP), former Member of the House of Representatives (Thailand)
- Nabiel Makarim (MPA '84), former Minister of Environment and Forestry for Indonesia
- Mark McClellan (MPA '91), former U.S. Commissioner of the Food and Drug Administration
- Yam Ah Mee (MPA '91), chief executive director, People's Association in Singapore
- Sanjay Mitra (MPA), IAS officer and former Defence Secretary of India
- Nripendra Misra (MPA), former IAS officer and Principal Secretary to the Prime Minister of India
- Eurídice Monteiro, Cape Verdean politician and Secretary of State for Higher Education from 2021 to 2025
- Toshimitsu Motegi (MPP '83), Secretary-General of Liberal Democratic Party and former Minister of Foreign Affairs for Japan
- George Muñoz (MPP '78), former Assistant Secretary and CFO of the U.S. Department of Treasury and former president and CEO of OPIC
- Andrew Natsios (MPA '79), former U.S. Agency for International Development administrator and U.S. Special Envoy to Sudan
- Amon Nikoi (MPA '56), former Minister for Finance and Economic Planning, Bank of Ghana governor, and Permanent Representative of Ghana to the United Nations
- Patrick Nip (MPA '01), former Secretary for the Civil Service of Hong Kong
- Christine Nixon (MPA '85), former chief police commissioner for Victoria, Australia
- Herbert S. Okun (MPA '59), former U.S. Ambassador to East Germany and former U.S. Deputy Ambassador to the United Nations
- Nóirín O'Sullivan (Exec '07), former national police commissioner for Ireland
- Marcus Peacock (MPP '86), former Deputy Administrator, U.S. Environmental Protection Agency
- Angelo Reyes (MPA '90), Secretary of Energy of the Philippines and former Secretary of National Defense of the Philippines
- Jesse Robredo (MPA '99), Secretary of Interior and Local Government of the Philippines
- Henry Rotich (MPA '), Cabinet Secretary for National Treasury of Kenya
- Pete Rouse (MPA '77), former White House Chief of Staff
- Nasir Ahmad el-Rufai, Executive Governor of Kaduna State in Nigeria, former Minister of FCT, and Director General of Bureau of Public Enterprises of Nigeria
- T. N. Seshan (MPA '68), former IAS officer and former Chief Election Commissioner and Cabinet Secretary of India
- Yasuhisa Shiozaki (MPA '82), former Chief Cabinet Secretary of Japan
- Corazon Soliman (MPA '98), former Secretary of the Department of Social Welfare and Development of the Philippines
- T. S. R. Subramanian (MPA), former Indian Administrative Service officer and Cabinet Secretary of India
- Sardar Ahmad Nawaz Sukhera (MPA), Commerce Secretary of Pakistan
- Nancy Sutley (MPP '86), White House Council on Environmental Quality director
- Syahrir (MPA '80, PhD '83), economic adviser, Republic of Indonesia's Council of Presidential Advisors
- Mark E. Talisman (1972), U.S. congressional aide and lobbyist
- William B. Taylor Jr. (MPP '77), U.S. ambassador to Ukraine
- Conrad Tillard (born 1964), Baptist minister, radio host, author, civil rights activist, and politician
- John Tsang (MPA '82), Financial Secretary of Hong Kong
- Paul Volcker (MA '51, GSPA), former chairman of the U.S. Federal Reserve and U.S. presidential economic advisor
- Solomon Areda Waktolla (MPA '13 and LLM'14), Judge at United Nations Dispute Tribunal, Judge of the Administrative Tribunal of the African Development Bank. Former Deputy chief justice of the Federal Supreme Court of Ethiopia and member of Permanent Court of Arbitration at Hague Netherlands
- Yin Yong (MPA), mayor of Beijing
- Agus Harimurti Yudhoyono (MPA), Minister of Agrarian Affairs and Spatial Planning of Indonesia
- Adolfo Aguilar Zínser (MPA '78), former national security adviser and ambassador to the United Nations for Mexico
- Olubukola Arowolo Verheijen, Special Adviser to the President of Nigeria on Oil and Gas.

==== Elected federal officials ====
- Doug Bereuter (MPA '73), former U.S. Congressman for Nebraska's 1st congressional district
- Brendan Boyle (MPP '05), U.S. Congressman for Pennsylvania's 2nd congressional district
- Katherine Clark (MPA '97), U.S. Representative, Massachusetts's 5th congressional district
- Gerry Connolly (MPA '79), former U.S. Congressman, Virginia's 11th congressional district
- Dan Crenshaw (MPA '17), U.S. Congressman, Texas's 2nd congressional district
- John Fetterman (MPP '99), U.S. Senator from Pennsylvania and former Lieutenant Governor of Pennsylvania
- Alan Grayson (MPP '83), former U.S. Congressman, Florida's 8th congressional district
- Katherine Harris (MPA '97), former Congresswoman, Florida's 13th congressional district and former Secretary of State of Florida
- Brian Higgins (MPA '96), U.S. Congressman, New York's 26th congressional district
- Steve Horn (MPA '55), former U.S. Congressman, California's 38th congressional district
- James Langevin (MPA '94), former U.S. Congressman, Rhode Island's 2nd congressional district
- Stephen Lynch (MPA '99), U.S. Congressman, Massachusetts's 8th congressional district
- Dan Maffei (MPP '95), former U.S. Congressman, New York's 24th congressional district
- Jim Moody (MPA '67), former U.S. Congressman, Wisconsin's 5th congressional district
- Larry Pressler (MPA '66), former U.S. Senator from South Dakota
- William Proxmire (MPA '48), former U.S. Senator from Wisconsin
- Jack Reed (MPP '73), U.S. Senator from Rhode Island
- Joe Sestak (MPA '80, PhD '84), former U.S. Congressman, Pennsylvania's 7th congressional district
- Rob Simmons (MPA '79), former U.S. Congressman, Connecticut's 2nd congressional district
- Ralf Stegner (MPA '89), former leader of the Social Democratic Party in Germany
- Peter G. Torkildsen (MPA '90), former U.S. Congressman, Massachusetts's 6th congressional district and former chair of Massachusetts Republican Party
- Robert Torricelli (MPA '80), former U.S. Senator from New Jersey
- Chris Van Hollen (MPP '85), U.S. Senator from Maryland
- Sujeet Kumar (politician) (MPP '2011), Member of Parliament, Rajya Sabha (Upper House) of Indian Parliament

==== Elected state and municipal officials ====
- Jeffrey Amestoy (MPA), former chief justice, Vermont Supreme Court, and Vermont Attorney General
- Bob Anthony (MPA), Oklahoma Corporation Commission member
- Robert Castelli (MPA '96), former member, New York State Assembly
- Jacqueline Y. Collins (MPA '01), former member, Illinois Senate
- Joseph Curtatone (MPA '11), former mayor, Somerville, Massachusetts
- Fernando Martín García (MPP '74), former New Hampshire State Representative
- Marilinda Garcia (MPA '10), member of the New Hampshire House of Representatives
- Paul Heroux, (MPA '11), Bristol County, Massachusetts sheriff, former Attleboro, Massachusetts mayor, and former Massachusetts State Representative
- Mark Levine (MPP '95), Manhattan borough president and former New York City Councilman
- Elias Mudzuri (MPA ), former mayor of Harare, Zimbabwe
- Charles A. Murphy, (MPA '02), former member, Massachusetts House of Representatives
- Naheed Nenshi (MPP '98), former mayor of Calgary, Alberta
- Barry T. Smitherman (MPA), member of the Texas Railroad Commission
- Miro Weinberger (MPP '98), former mayor of Burlington, Vermont
- Kevin White (MA '57, GSPA), former Mayor of Boston
- Anthony A. Williams (MPP '87), former mayor of Washington, D.C.
- Anthony Winza Probowo (MPA'2024), former Jakarta Regional House of Representatives member

==== Royalty ====
- Princess Elisabeth, Duchess of Brabant, heir apparent, Belgian throne after her father, Philippe of Belgium

=== Academia ===
- William Alonso (MPP '56), economist, former director of Harvard Center for Population Studies
- Bernadette Atuahene (MPA '02), property law scholar, James E. Jones Chair at the University of Wisconsin Law School
- Lawrence S. Bacow (MPP '76, PhD '76), former Harvard University president, former Tufts University president, former MIT chancellor
- Steve Charnovitz (MPP '83), international law professor, George Washington University Law School
- Ronald A. Heifetz (MPA '83), co-founder, Center for Public Leadership, and public leadership lecturer at Harvard Kennedy School
- Steve Horn (MPA '55), former president of California State University, Long Beach
- Ira Jackson (MPA '86), dean, Peter F. Drucker and Masatoshi Ito Graduate School of Management at Claremont Graduate University
- Garry Jenkins (MPP '98), legal scholar, president, Bates College
- Nancy Koehn (MPP), author, historian, and Harvard Business School business history professor
- Mark Lilla (MPP '80), professor of humanities, Columbia University
- Bruce Ovbiagele (Exec Public Leadership, '18; Exec Non-profit Leadership, '19), professor of neurology, associate dean, and healthcare system leader at University of California, San Francisco
- Hollis Robbins (MPP '90), dean of humanities, University of Utah
- Mark Schuster (MPP '88), dean and founding CEO, Kaiser Permanente Bernard J. Tyson School of Medicine
- Steven Tepper (MPP '96), sociologist, president, Hamilton College
- Stephen Joel Trachtenberg (MPA '66), former president, George Washington University
- William E. Trueheart (MPA '73), former president, Bryant University
- Jonathan Zittrain (MPA '95), professor of international law, Harvard Law School and co-founder of Harvard's Berkman Klein Center for Internet & Society

=== Arts ===
- Will Butler (MPA '17), musician and former member of Arcade Fire
- Jessica Chastain (MPA ‘27), Actress
- Ashley Judd (MPA '10), actress and activist
- Hill Harper (MPA '92), actor and author
- Mary Lambeth Moore (MPP), writer and podcaster
- Thor Steingraber (MPA '09), opera director
- Damian Woetzel (MPA '07), former principal dancer, New York City Ballet

=== Business ===
- Rune Bjerke (MPA '97), CEO, DNB ASA
- Gregory C. Carr (MPP '86), founder, Boston Technology
- Leonard S. Coleman Jr. (MPA '75), former president, National League
- Benjamin Fernandes (Exec. Ed'17), Tanzanian entrepreneur
- Philip Johnston (MPA '19), Co-Counder and CEO of Starcloud
- Debra L. Lee (MPP '80), president and CEO, Black Entertainment Television
- Daniel Mudd (MPA '86), former president and CEO, Fannie Mae
- Carolina Müller-Möhl (Women's Leadership Council), businesswoman, philanthropist, and women's rights activist
- Hilda Ochoa-Brillembourg (MPA '71), founder, president, and CEO of Strategic Investment Group
- Greg Rosenbaum (MPP '77), CEO, Empire Kosher Poultry, Inc.
- Peter Sands (MPA '88), Group CEO, Standard Chartered
- Klaus Schwab (MPA '67), founder and executive chairman, World Economic Forum
- Faryar Shirzad (MPP '89), managing director, Goldman Sachs, former U.S. Deputy National Security Advisor
- Chris Voss, adjunct professor, McDonough School of Business

=== Media ===
- Malik Siraj Akbar (MPA, '16), editor-in-chief, The Baloch Hal, and exiled Pakistani journalist
- Kevin Corke (MPA '04), White House Correspondent, Fox News
- Komla Dumor (MPA,'03), television news presenter, BBC World News and Africa Business Report
- Justin Fox (born 1964), financial journalist, commentator, and writer
- Caroline Glick (MPP '00), deputy managing editor, The Jerusalem Post
- Wajahat Saeed Khan, Pakistani journalist, Dunya News and NBC News
- Mark A. R. Kleiman (MPP, PhD '85), author
- Kaj Larsen (MPP '07), former U.S. Navy SEAL, journalist for Vice News
- Dambisa Moyo (MPA '07), economist and author
- Bill O'Reilly (MPA '96), political commentator
- Andrew Sullivan (MPA, PhD '90), journalist, The Atlantic

=== Military ===
- John C. Acton (Exec '05), retired United States Coast Guard rear admiral who serves as the Director of Operations Coordination for DHS
- John R. Allen Jr. (Exec '85), retired United States Air Force brigadier general and highly decorated command pilot
- William J. Begert (Exec '95), commander, Pacific Air Forces, and Air Component Commander for the Commander, United States Pacific Command
- Franklin J. Blaisdell (Exec), U.S. Air Force Major General
- Sally Brice-O'Hara (MPA '93), 27th Vice Commandant of the United States Coast Guard
- Dan Crenshaw (MPA '17), former United States Navy SEAL Lieutenant Commander
- Peter V. Neffenger (MPA '95), 29th Vice Commandant of the United States Coast Guard and former Administrator of the Transportation Security Administration
- Michael E. Fortney (Exec '11), U.S. Air Force Brigadier General
- Jeffrey Fowler (MPA '90), U.S. Navy vice admiral and superintendent, United States Naval Academy
- John C. Harvey (MPA '88), U.S. Navy admiral; Commander, U.S. Fleet Forces Command
- Muhammad Haszaimi (Exec '16), Royal Brunei Armed Forces Commander
- Robert C. Hinson (Exec), U.S. Air Force Lieutenant General
- William E. Ingram Jr. (Exec '02), U.S. Army Lieutenant General and Director of the Army National Guard
- Richard C. Johnston (Exec), U.S. Air Force Brigadier General
- Andrew F. Krepinevich Jr. (MPA '80), U.S. Army lieutenant colonel and author, The Army and Vietnam
- Rick Linnehan (MPA '09), astronaut
- Christopher Loria (MPA '04), astronaut
- Robert W. Parker (Exec '91), U.S. Air Force Major General
- Timothy S. Sullivan (Exec), U.S. Coast Guard Rear Admiral
- Guy C. Swan III (MPA '86), U.S. Army Major General, Commanding General of the Military District of Washington
- Jack Weinstein (Exec '06), U.S. Air Force Major General

=== Non-profit organizations ===
- Ramaswami Balasubramaniam (MPA'10), founder and president, Swami Vivekananda Youth Movement
- Lester R. Brown (MPA '62), founder and president, Earth Policy Institute
- Rick Doblin (PhD '01), founder and executive director, Multidisciplinary Association for Psychedelic Studies (MAPS)
- Robert Kagan (MPP '91), co-founder, Project for a New American Century
- Nancy LeaMond (MPP '74), executive vice president, AARP
- Giovanna Negretti (MPA '05), co-founder and executive director, ¿Oiste?
- Ayisha Osori, former CEO, Nigerian Women's Trust Fund
- Orondaam Otto, founder, Slum2School Africa
- Michelle Rhee (MPP '97), founder, The New Teacher Project, and chancellor, Washington, D.C. public school system
- Bryan Stevenson (MPP '85), founder and executive director, Equal Justice Initiative, and author of Just Mercy
- Rye Barcott (MPP '09), co-founder and CEO of With Honor

=== Science ===
- Susan C. Gardner, environmental scientist

=== Spies ===
- Donald Heathfield (real name: Andrey Bezrukov) (MPA '00) – KGB and SVR operative until his disclosure in the United States in 2010

== Notable faculty ==
- Graham Allison
- Alan A. Altshuler
- Jacinda Ardern
- Christopher N. Avery
- Mary Jo Bane
- David J. Barron
- Jacqueline Bhabha
- Linda Bilmes
- Robert Blendon
- Derek Bok
- George Borjas
- Matthew Bunn
- R. Nicholas Burns
- Felipe Calderón
- Albert Carnesale
- Ashton Carter
- Erica Chenoweth
- William C. Clark
- Richard Clarke
- Susan P. Crawford
- David Cutler
- David Deming
- Michael Dukakis
- David Ellwood
- Jeffrey Frankel
- Jason Furman
- Marshall Ganz
- David Gergen
- Edward Glaeser
- Robert R. Glauber
- Stephen Goldsmith
- Ricardo Hausmann
- J. Bryan Hehir
- Ronald Heifetz
- John P. Holdren
- Swanee Hunt
- Michael Ignatieff
- Sheila Jasanoff
- Christopher Jencks
- Alex Jones
- Dale Jorgenson
- Juliette Kayyem
- Alexander Keyssar
- Alexandra Killewald
- Robert Z. Lawrence
- Jennifer Lerner
- Tarek Masoud
- Rana Mitter
- Joseph Newhouse
- Pippa Norris
- Joseph Nye
- Meghan O'Sullivan
- George Papandreou
- Roger B. Porter
- Michael Porter
- Samantha Power
- Lant Pritchett
- Robert Putnam
- Carmen M. Reinhart
- Leni Robredo
- Dani Rodrik
- Todd Rogers (behavioral scientist)
- Kevin Rudd
- John Ruggie
- Juan Manuel Santos
- Frederic M. Scherer
- Bruce Schneier
- Leslie Rogne Schumacher
- Jeffrey L. Seglin
- Sarah Sewall
- Kathryn Sikkink
- Carol Ruth Silver
- Lawrence Summers
- Dennis Frank Thompson
- Stephen Walt
- Shirley Williams, Baroness Williams of Crosby
- John P. White
- William Julius Wilson
- Richard Zeckhauser
- Dorothy Zinberg
- Jonathan Zittrain
- Robert Zoellick

== See also ==
- List of memorials to John F. Kennedy
- Public policy school
