= Ronald Heifetz =

American psychiatrist and academic

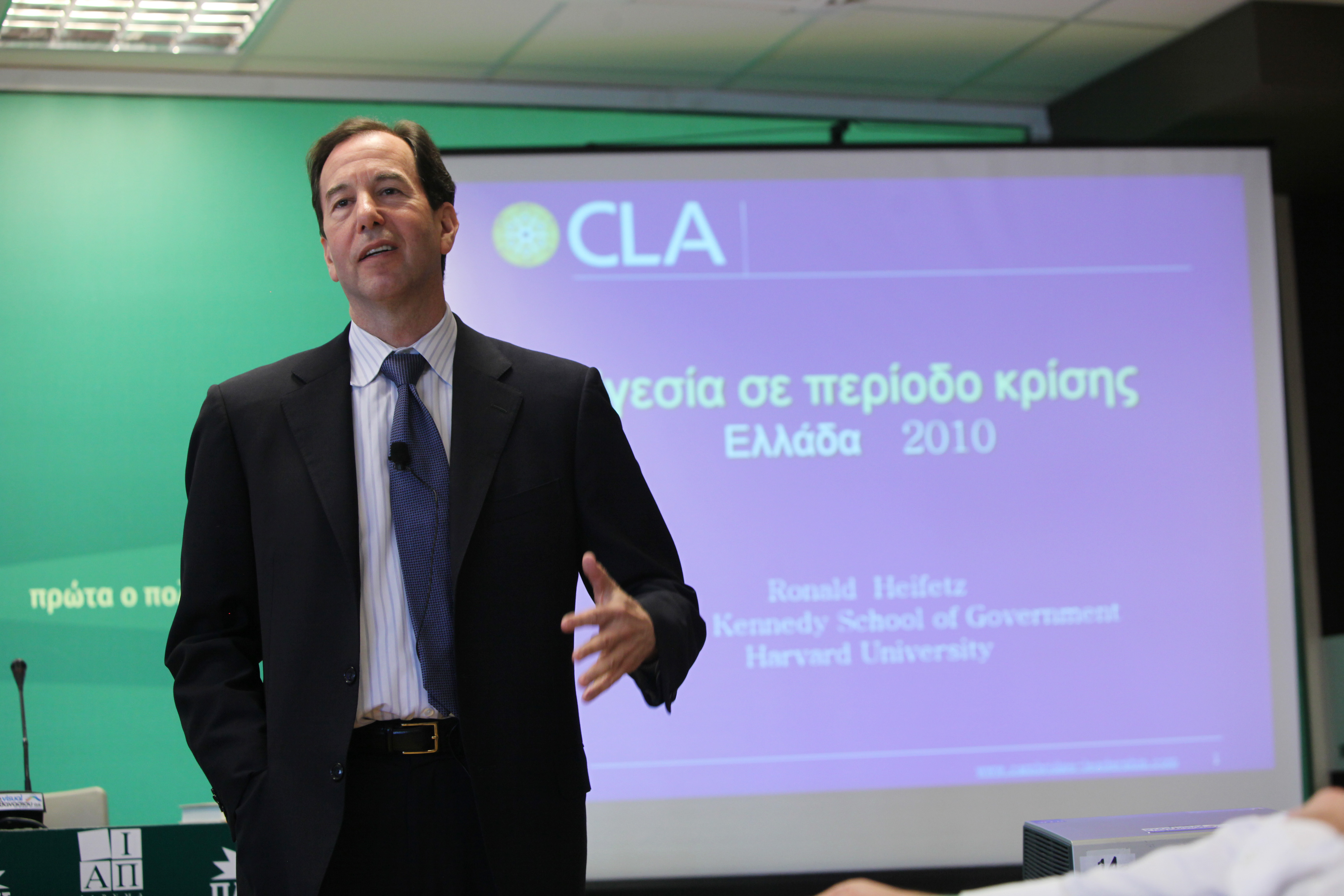
- Heifetz in 2010
- Born: Ronnie Lee Heifetz; February 7, 1951 (age 75)
- Education: Columbia University (BA); Harvard University (MD, MPA)
- Scientific career
- Fields: Psychiatry
- Workplaces: Harvard Kennedy School

Ronald Heifetz (born February 7, 1951) is an academic and author. He is the Hussein bin Talal Senior Lecturer in Public Leadership, Founding Director of the Center for Public Leadership at Harvard Kennedy School at Harvard University, and co-founder of Cambridge Leadership Associates.

Formerly a clinical instructor in psychiatry at Harvard Medical School, Heifetz works with leaders in government, nonprofits, and business. His work on adaptive leadership has garnered attention in educational fields. Named "case-in-point" (CIP) teaching, this method focuses on implementing aspects of Heifetz's work within the class itself. CIP has four main distinctions: 1) authority does not equal leadership, 2) understanding the difference between technical and adaptive challenges, 3) Power (of the individual) vs. progress, and 4) Personality (of the individual) vs. presence (skills & practice).

== Books ==
- Heifetz, Ronald A., Grashow, Alexander, and Linsky, Marty. The Practice of Adaptive Leadership: Tools and Tactics for Changing Your Organization and the World. Harvard Business Review Press, 2009.
- Heifetz, Ronald A., and Marty Linsky. Leadership on the Line: Staying Alive through the Dangers of Leading (Chinese translation). Bardon-Chinese Media Agency, 2003.
- Heifetz, Ronald A., and Linsky, Marty. Liderazgo Sin Limites: Manual de Supervivencia para Managers. Paidos, 2003.
- Heifetz, Ronald A., and Linsky, Marty. Leadership on the Line: Staying Alive through the Dangers of Leading. Harvard Business School Press, 2002.
- Heifetz, Ronald A., and Linsky, Marty. I Skudlinjen, Hvordan man overlever i Lederskabets Jungle. Borsens, 2002.
- Heifetz, Ronald A. Leadership Without Easy Answers. Belknap Press of Harvard Business School Press, 1994.
