= Orondaam Otto =

Nigerian non-profit executive

- Born: August 8, 1987 (age 38)
- Education: Harvard Kennedy School, University of Port Harcourt
- Occupations: Social entrepreneur, philanthropist

Orondaam Otto (born 8 August 1987) is a Nigerian social entrepreneur, education advocate and philanthropist. He is the founder of Slum2School Africa, a nonprofit organization and the first to build a Virtual Learning Classroom in Sub-Saharan Africa. He is also one of the founding members of The Lagos State Employment Trust Fund. Otto is a two-time winner of The Future Awards Africa and a member of the Harvard Kennedy School Alumni Board.

== Early life and education ==
Orondaam Otto born on 8 August 1987 in northern Nigeria, originally hails from Port Harcourt, Rivers State. He earned a Bachelor's degree in Human Anatomy from the University of Port Harcourt. In 2022, he finished from the Harvard Kennedy School with a Master's degree in Public Administration. At Harvard, Otto won the Erik Yankah Award and Lucius N. Littauer Fellowship Award for leadership.

== Career ==
Orondaam Otto started his career in the social sector at the age of 16 by participating in volunteer organizations focused on improving the living conditions of children in poor communities.

In 2011, while undergoing his National Youth Service Corps (NYSC) program, Otto discovered the Makoko Community and the substandard living condition of the children who had little or no access to quality education. While Otto was in the NYSC camp, he began to think on how to address the issues of education among underprivileged children. Later in his youth service program, he officially started Slum2School Africa, a charity organization focused on addressing the increasing number of out-of-school children in Africa, particularly those in slums and underserved communities.

In 2020, during the COVID-19 pandemic, Otto built the first Virtual Learning Classroom in Africa to facilitate remote education for children. He was also featured as an African Change-maker on the CNN African voices documentary.

The classes are designed to mimic classroom interactions found in a traditional school setting and are billed as the first of its kind in the country and within the Sub-Saharan region, according to Slum2School.

— CNN on Slum2School Africa Virtual Learning Classroom

In 2016, Otto was a Mandela Washington Fellow, alongside Adebola Williams and Grace Ihejiamaizu. He served as the chairman of the West and Central African Regional Advisory Board of the Young African Leaders Initiative (YALI) launched by President Barack Obama. In 2022, he was appointed to the HKS Black Alumni Board, and in 2024, he was appointed to the Harvard Kennedy School Alumni Board.

== Recognition ==
Otto won The Future Awards Africa in 2012 and 2013 for his innovation in education. Otto was named among the Global 100 Most Influential People of African Descent by the United Nations General Assembly. He was also listed in the YNaija 2020 Powerlist of Nigerians in Advocacy .

In 2022, he was nominated for the Business Insider Africa Awards in the social entrepreneur of the year category.
