= Roderick Allison =

American politician

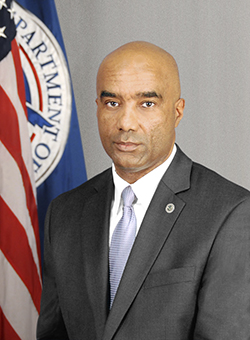

Acting Deputy Administrator of the Transportation Security Administration
- In office November 2015 – July 2018
- Succeeded by: Patricia Cogswell

Personal details
- Education: Fayetteville State University (BS); Webster University (MA)

Military service
- Allegiance: United States of America
- Branch/service: United States Army

Roderick "Rod" Allison is the former Acting Deputy Administrator of the Transportation Security Administration and Director of the Federal Air Marshal Service.

== Early life and education ==
Allison received a Bachelor of Science in Psychology from Fayetteville State University in Fayetteville, North Carolina. He attended graduate school at Webster University's St. Louis, Missouri campus, earning a Master of Arts in Business and Organizational Security Management.

He has also attended executive development courses at Duke University, Harvard University, and the Federal Executive Institute.

== Career ==
Allison began his career in 1985 in the United States Army, serving for 13 years. His service included assignments with the National Security Agency in Fort Meade, Maryland, the 7th Special Forces Group in Fort Bragg, North Carolina, and with the US Army Military District of Washington.

In 1998, Allison joined the Federal Air Marshal Service, when it was still part of the Federal Aviation Administration's Civil Aviation Security Program. He later worked as a criminal investigator with the Office of the Inspector General, United States Postal Service.

Following the September 11 attacks, in 2002, Allison rejoined the Federal Air Marshal Service and served as an assistant to the special agent in charge of the Washington, DC field office. Since then, he has served as Executive Advisor to the Director at the Office of Law Enforcement, Transportation Security Administration, and Supervisory Air Marshal in Charge, Field Operations Division, and Supervisory Air Marshal in Charge, Washington field office.

In June 2014, Allison was named Director of the Federal Air Marshal Service. Much of his time in office was spent in dealing with dozens of scandals involving air marshals. In September 2015, Allison appeared before the US House of Representatives' Oversight and Government Reform Committee to speak about an incident involving air marshals who hired prostitutes and recorded sex acts on their government phones while working overseas. Allison testified that the FAMS had learned of the misconduct in June 2015 and suspended the marshals without pay in mid-July, vowing to the representatives that he was committed to making sure that "these individuals are shown to the door."

Committee members from both political parties praised Allison for his response. Republican Committee Chairman Jason Chaffetz spoke in hearing, saying:

I have been very impressed with the openness and transparency. We've had a series of different agencies that have come before us, and basically they said they couldn't take decisive action. We've had some very salacious conduct from some of their employees.

Democratic committee Ranking Member Elijah Cummings also praised Allison's response, saying:

Based on the limited information the committee has obtained to date, it appears that managers at your agency have been acting appropriately, using existing legal authorities to investigate and take action on these cases. We want bad employees to be rooted out as quickly as possible because they give a bad name to the vast majority of federal workers who devote their entire careers and lives to this nation. We also want to protect the rights of employees accused of misconduct to ensure that they have due process to defend themselves against accusations that are false.

Cummings went on to commend Allison for taking disciplinary action, which "not all agencies do." Allison described his procedure, which included inspiring and leading employees, and exercising swift discipline for air marshals involved in misconduct. He held 50 town hall meetings with employees across the United States and created an alcohol awareness initiative. He told the congressmen: "I have to candidly admit that there are people who don't feel like the rules apply to them." He did make it clear, however, that did not think the agency had a culture problem. He said, "They don't wear a T-shirt, you have to find them."

In November 2015, Allison was appointed Acting Deputy Administrator of the Transportation Security Administration by Peter V. Neffenger, Administrator of the TSA and retired in July 2018. He left his position as Director of the Federal Air Marshall Service. During his tenure, he worked to establish partnerships with federal, state, and local leaders in support of the work of the TSA.

== Awards and honors ==
Award for Excellence from the President's Council on Integrity and Efficiency
