= Sally Brice-O'Hara =

Vice-Commandant of the United States Coast Guard

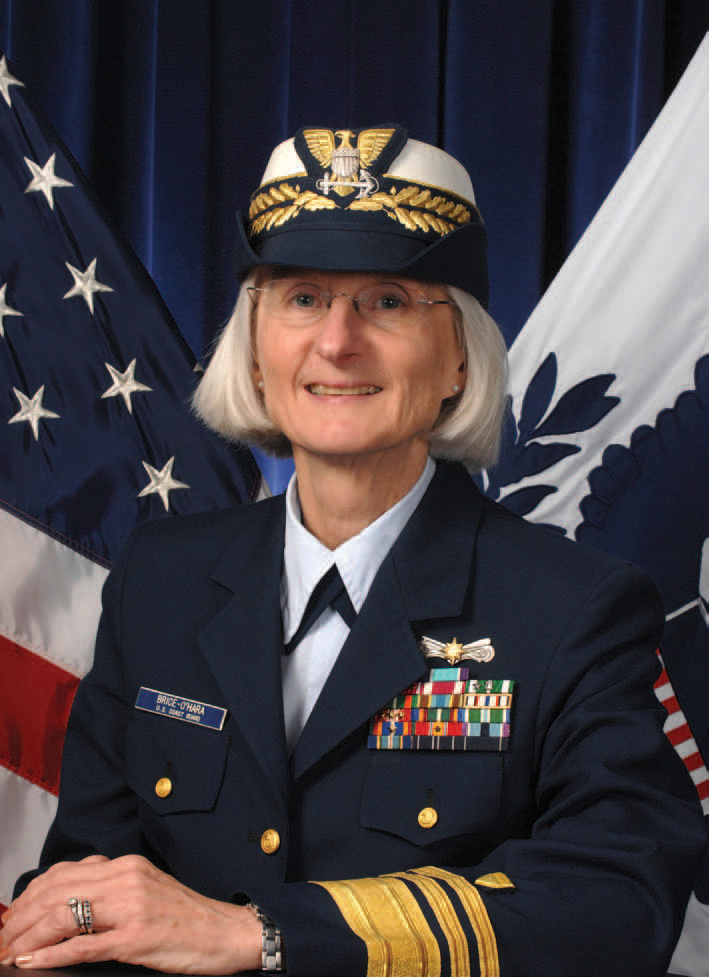
- Vice Admiral Sally Brice-O'Hara; 27th Vice Commandant of the United States Coast Guard
- Born: 1953 (age 72–73)
- Military career
- Allegiance: United States of America
- Branch: Coast Guard
- Rank: Vice admiral
- Commands: 14th Coast Guard District; JIATF West; 5th Coast Guard District; Training Center Cape May; Group Baltimore; Station Cape May
- Conflicts: Cold War; September 11, 2001 attacks
- Awards: Coast Guard Distinguished Service Medal; Legion of Merit (5)

Flag of the Vice Commandant of the United States Coast Guard

Vice Admiral Sally Brice-O'Hara (born c. 1953) is an American retired coast guardsman who was the 27th vice-commandant of the U.S. Coast Guard.

== Education ==
Brice-O'Hara attended Annapolis High School where one of her classmates was Bill Belichick. She graduated from Goucher College, where she earned a Bachelor of Arts degree in sociology in 1974. Brice-O'Hara received her Coast Guard commission from Officer Candidate School 1975. She received a Master of Arts degree in public administration from Harvard University, John F. Kennedy School of Government, and a Master of Science degree in national security strategy from the National War College.

== Career ==
Her previous flag officer assignments include:

- Commander, Coast Guard District Fourteen, Honolulu, Hawaii
- Director, JIATF West, Honolulu, Hawaii
- Director, Training and Reserve, Coast Guard Headquarters, Washington, D.C.
- Commander, Coast Guard District Five, Portsmouth, Virginia

Her other assignments include:

- Director of personnel management, Coast Guard Headquarters, Washington, D.C.
- Commanding officer, Training Center Cape May, New Jersey, the Coast Guard's only recruit training program
- Member, Commandant's Strategic Planning Staff, Coast Guard Headquarters, Washington, D.C.
- Deputy commander, Coast Guard Activities Baltimore and alternate Captain of the Port, Baltimore, Maryland
- Commander, Group Baltimore, Maryland
- Officer assignment detailer, Coast Guard Headquarters, Washington, D.C.
- Planning officer, United States Coast Guard Support Center, Kodiak, Alaska
- Commanding officer of Coast Guard Station, Cape May, New Jersey
- Assistant director of admissions, United States Coast Guard Academy, New London, Connecticut
- Executive officer of Coast Guard Station, New London, Connecticut
- Fisheries and Law Enforcement duty officer, Coast Guard District Five, Portsmouth, Virginia

=== Deputy Commandant for Operations ===
Brice-O'Hara served as the deputy commandant for operations from 2008 to 2010. She oversaw the strategic integration of operational missions and the optimization of policy development and mission execution consistent with the Coast Guard's national priorities.

=== Vice-Commandant ===
Brice-O'Hara was the 27th vice-commandant of the United States Coast Guard. In a change of command ceremony on May 24, 2010, she relieved Vice Admiral David Pekoske. She was only the second woman to be vice-commandant, the first being Vice Admiral Vivien Crea. In a change of command ceremony on May 18, 2012, she was relieved as vice-commandant by Vice Admiral John Currier.

== Awards ==
Coast Guard Distinguished Service Medal
Legion of Merit with four gold stars, signifying five awards
Meritorious Service Medal
Coast Guard Commendation Medal with one silver star and "O" Device
Coast Guard Achievement Medal
Commandant's Letter of Commendation

== Personal life ==
Brice-O'Hara is a longtime resident of Annapolis, Maryland. Brice-O'Hara has two sons with her husband Robert O'Hara.

Military offices
Preceded by David Pekoske	Vice Commandant of the United States Coast Guard; 2010–2012	Succeeded by John Currier
