= Norman Zinberg =

American psychiatrist

- Born: 1922; Harrisburg, Pennsylvania
- Died: April 2, 1989 (aged 66–67); Cambridge, Massachusetts
- Occupations: Psychoanalyst and psychiatrist
- Known for: Addiction research

Norman Earl Zinberg (1922 – April 2, 1989) was an American psychoanalyst and psychiatrist whose research into addiction is seen as a great influence on current clinical models and greatly influenced the work of addiction treatment specialists such as Stanton Peele. He was a clinical professor of psychiatry at the Harvard Medical School and a psychiatrist at Cambridge Hospital. He also taught at Boston University and the Tufts School of Medicine.

Zinberg earned his bachelor's and doctoral degrees from the University of Maryland.

Zinberg studied recreational heroin users over a ten-year period, and his book Drug, Set, and Setting: The Basis for Controlled Intoxicant Use explains with data and case histories why people's relation to drug use could change according to type of drug (including its method of ingestion), their mindset, and social setting. One of his early studies in the area concerned a number of American soldiers who became addicted to heroin during the Vietnam War as what Zinberg viewed as an attempt to "blot out" the intensity of their environment. Once back in the States, their usage "virtually ceased"; 88% of the soldiers did not become readdicted after returning stateside. His work contradicted the idea that some people have "addictive personalities" while other do not.

Howard Shaffer, a colleague at Harvard and at Cambridge Hospital, said about Zinberg "He had a remarkable impact on our understanding that drug effects are not simply a consequence of biochemistry. He showed that an individual's expectations, his psychological set and his social milieu interact to produce the effects on behavior that we observe. Equally important, Norman Zinberg helped us explain why an addictive drug affects a person differently at different times and how it affects various people in different ways."

In addition to his addiction work, Zinberg was one of the first appointees to the National AIDS Commission.

Norman Zinberg collaborated on some studies and books with his wife Dorothy Zinberg.
