= Nancy LeaMond =

American lobbyist

Nancy LeaMond currently serves as AARP's Chief Advocacy and Engagement Officer. She leads government relations and campaigns for AARP, widely seen as one of the most powerful advocacy organizations in the country. She also oversees AARP's public education and outreach initiatives designed to help Americans take charge of their health and better plan, work, and save for retirement. She was formerly CEO/President for five years of the Congressional Economic Leadership Institute, a public policy group founded in 1987 to identify and research emerging international economic, trade, technology, tax and workforce issues.

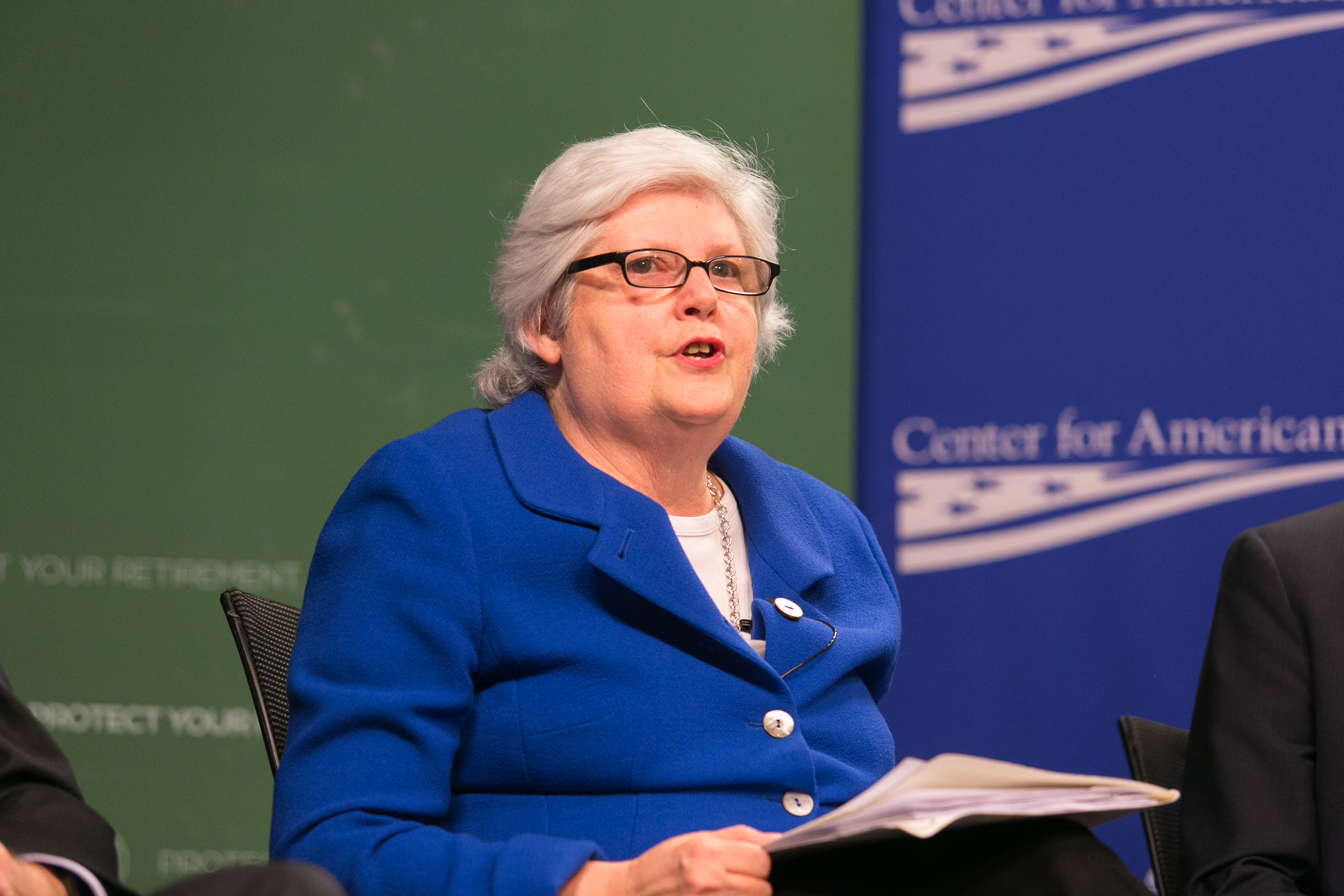

She began her career as the Chief of Staff to U.S. Congresswoman Mary Rose Oakar. On March 18, 1993, she was nominated by President Clinton to serve as Assistant U.S. Trade Representative (USTR) for Congressional Affairs. She served as Chief of Staff to U.S. Trade Representative Charlene Barshefsky.

As USTR, she helped to accomplish the following:

- 1) Co-ordinated public affairs activities around the enactment of major trade agreements with Jordan and China
- 2) 1999 negotiations of the World Trade Organization
- 3) Successful management of the passage of major Presidential legislative initiatives including North America Free Trade Agreement, General Agreement on Tariffs and Trade (Uruguay Round) and China MFN.

== Awards ==
Nancy LeaMond also served in the U.S. Departments of Commerce and Education; she was awarded the "Professional Achievement Award" for her accomplishments.

== Credentials ==
LeaMond holds a bachelor's degree in Sociology/Urban Studies from Smith College and a master's degree in City Planning from Harvard University's John F. Kennedy School of Government.
