= Gankhuurai Battungalag =

Mongolian diplomat

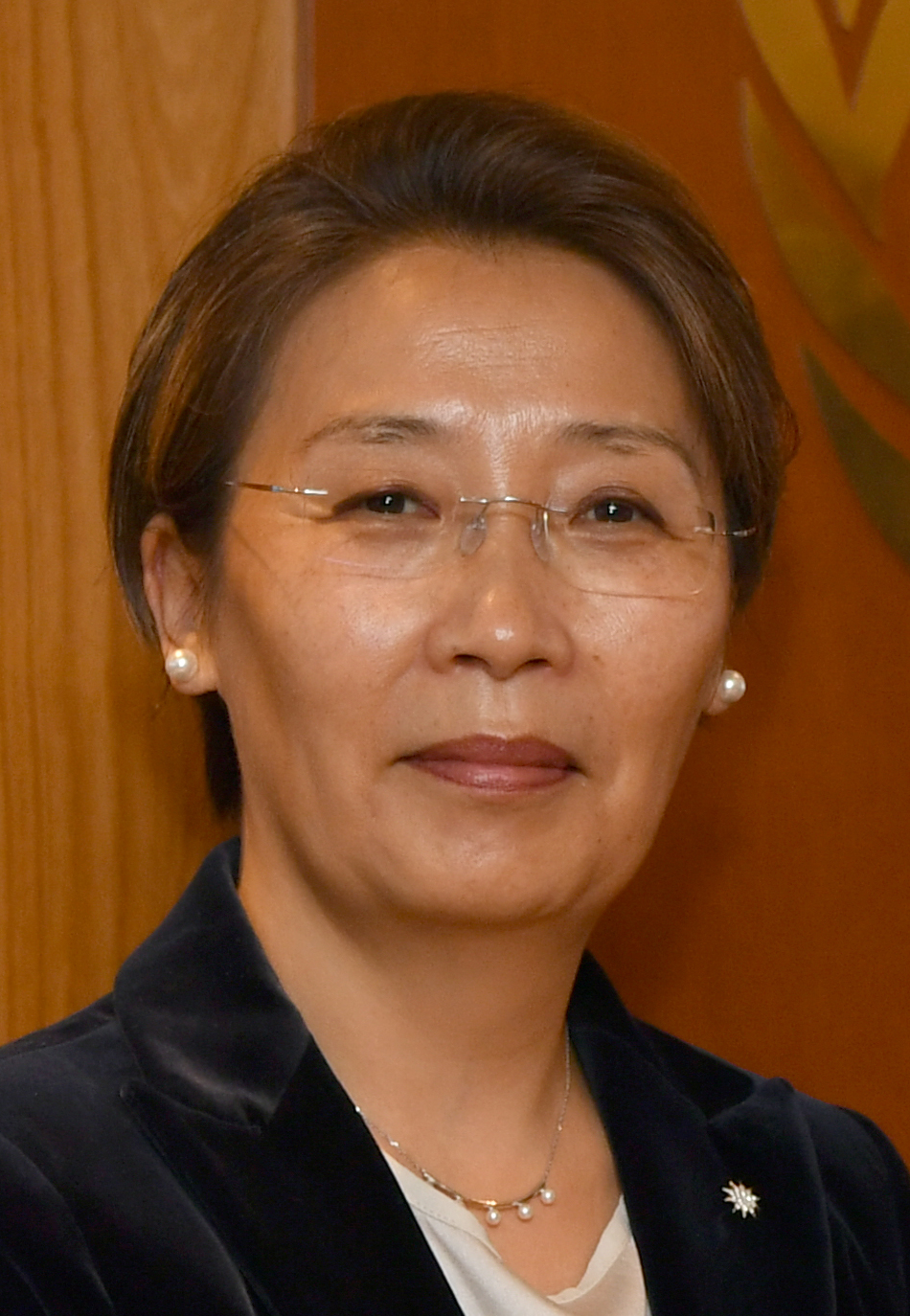
- Battungalag in 2020
- Born: Gankhuurai Battungalag; Mongolia
- Education: Moscow State Institute of International Relations; Victoria University of Wellington; Harvard Kennedy School

Gankhuurai Battungalag (Mongolian: Ганхуурай Баттунгалаг) is a Mongolian diplomat.

== Education ==
Battungalag studied at the Moscow State Institute of International Relations, Russia; Victoria University of Wellington, New Zealand; and the Harvard Kennedy School, United States.

== Career ==
On 10 May 2017, Battungalag presented her credentials as the permanent representative of Mongolia at the Vienna office of the United Nations.

Battungalag was Mongolia's ambassador to Austria, Bosnia and Herzegovina, Croatia, Montenegro and Slovenia from 2017 to 2021, and at the end of this term was appointed as the honorary president of the Austro-Mongolian society OTSCHIR.

As of 2022 Battungalag held the post of Director General of the Department for Europe of the Ministry of Foreign Affairs of Mongolia.
