= John Currier =

American Coast Guard admiral (1951-2020)

John P. Currier
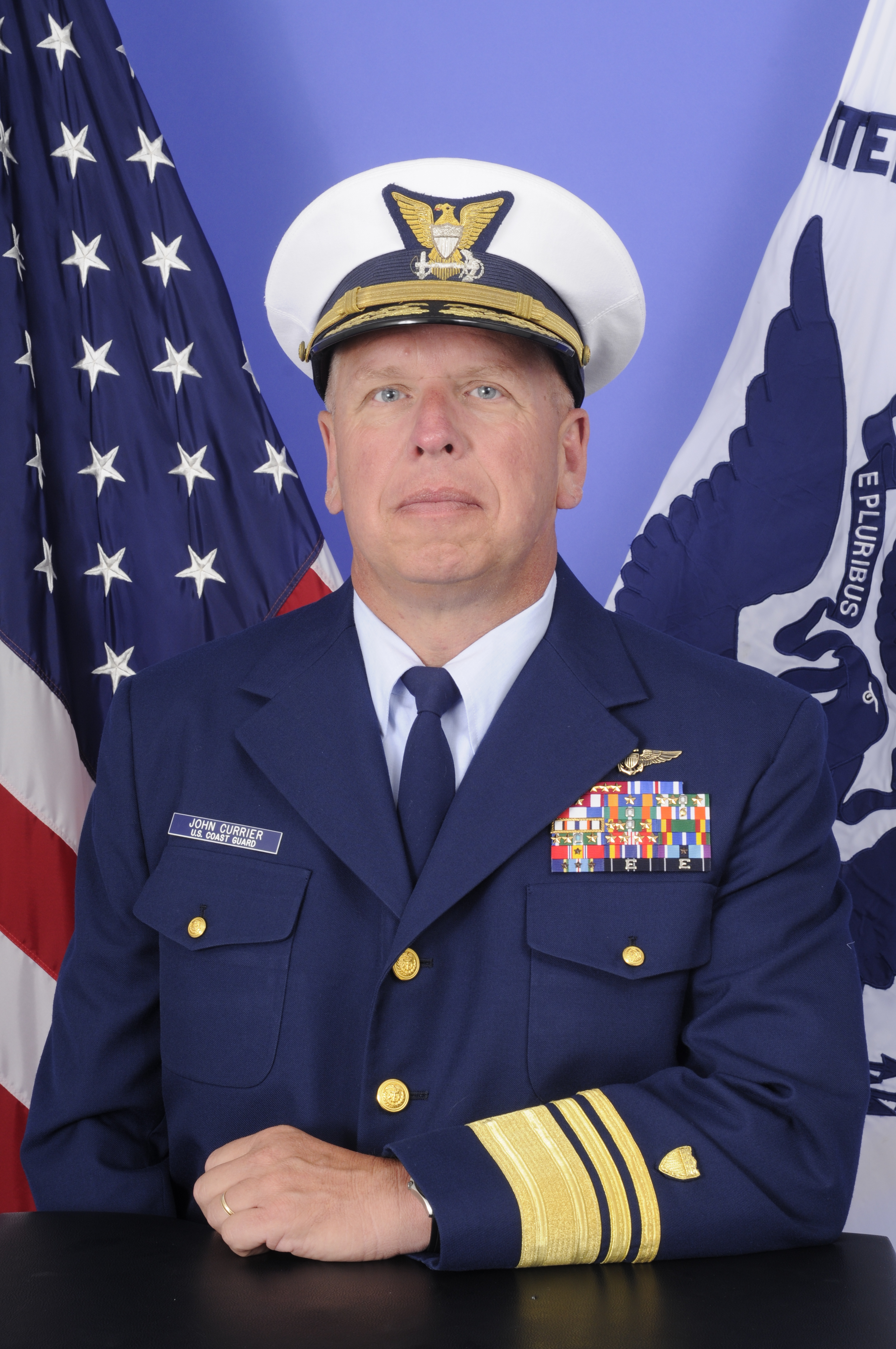
- VADM Currier, 28th Vice Commandant of the United States Coast Guard
- Born: December 18, 1951; Portland, Maine, U.S.
- Died: March 1, 2020 (aged 68) Traverse City, Michigan, U.S.
- Allegiance: United States of America
- Branch: United States Coast Guard
- Service years: 1976–2014
- Rank: Vice Admiral
- Commands: Chief of Staff, USCG; Coast Guard District Thirteen; Coast Guard Air Station Miami; Coast Guard Air Station Detroit
- Conflicts: Cold War; September 11, 2001 attacks
- Awards: Homeland Security Distinguished Service Medal; Coast Guard Distinguished Service Medal; Legion of Merit; Distinguished Flying Cross; Meritorious Service Medal; Air Medal; Coast Guard Commendation Medal with "O" device Coast Guard Achievement Medal with "O" device

Vice Admiral John P. Currier (December 18, 1951 – March 1, 2020) was the 28th Vice Commandant of the United States Coast Guard. He assumed the position from Vice Admiral Sally Brice-O'Hara on May 18, 2012 and was relieved on May 20, 2014 by Vice Admiral Peter Neffenger.

Previously, VADM Currier commanded Coast Guard District 13. He was relieved as district commander by Rear Admiral Gary Blore on July 14, 2009. Admiral Currier was selected for promotion to vice admiral and subsequently served as Chief of Staff of the Coast Guard.

== Background ==
Currier was born in Portland, Maine and graduated from Cheverus High School in Portland, Maine, in 1970. He lived in Westbrook, Maine with his family and then joined the Westbrook Police Department. John Currier was commissioned in the U. S. Coast Guard after graduating from Officers' Candidate School in 1976 and, on completion of Naval Flight Training, was designated a Coast Guard Aviator in 1977. A graduate of the University of Southern Maine, he held a Masters in Business from Embry–Riddle University. He was a 1996 graduate of the U. S. Air Force Air War College in Montgomery, Alabama. Previous assignments have included duty at Coast Guard Air Stations Cape Cod, Massachusetts and Sitka, Alaska. He was designated an Aeronautical Engineer in 1982 and served as Engineering Officer at Coast Guard Air Stations Traverse City, Michigan and Astoria, Oregon. Other assignments have included Deputy Program Manager (Engineering) for the U. S. Coast Guard HH-60J and Navy HH-60H helicopter acquisition at the Naval Air Systems Command in Washington, DC. VADM Currier commanded Air Station Detroit, Michigan from 1996 through 1998.

He served as Chief of Search and Rescue Operations and Director of Auxiliary for the Ninth Coast Guard District (Great Lakes) from 1998 through 2001. He then commanded Air Station Miami, the world's busiest air-sea rescue unit, from August 2001 through June 2003. Subsequently, he served as Pacific Area Chief of Operations, and then as Area Chief of Staff. Promoted to Flag rank in 2005, his most recent assignment was Assistant Commandant for Acquisition at Coast Guard Headquarters. VADM Currier was a veteran aviator with over 6000 flight hours in Coast Guard and Navy fixed and rotary-wing aircraft. His professional recognition includes the Harmon International Aviation Trophy, the Alaska Air Command SAR Pilot of the Year Award, American Helicopter Society, Fredrick L. Feinberg Award and the Naval Helicopter Association SAR Aircrew of the Year, all awarded for hazardous rescue missions.

Currier died on March 1, 2020, aged 68 at his home in Traverse City, Michigan. Currier was married to the former Mary Jane Greenleaf of South Portland, Maine and had two sons.

== Awards and decorations ==
Currier's awards include:

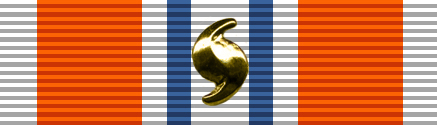

During his late service he was the Ancient Albatross, which made him the longest serving Coast Guard Aviator on active duty. His professional recognition includes the Harmon International Aviation Trophy, the Alaska Air Command SAR Pilot of the Year Award, Fredrick L. Feinberg Award of the American Helicopter Society, and the Naval Helicopter Association SAR Aircrew of the Year. All of these were awarded for rescue operations.

Military offices
Preceded by Sally Brice-O'Hara	Vice Commandant of the United States Coast Guard; 2012–2014	Succeeded by Peter Neffenger
