= The Economist Magazine's List of America's Best Colleges =

The Economist in October 2015 published results of own research and its first-ever U.S.college rankings.

The objective of new college rankings set to define and display comparable economical advantages, what may be of particular importance for prospective students: 'the economic value of a university is equal to the gap between how much its students subsequently earn, and how much they might have made had they studied elsewhere'.

On September 12 U.S. Department of Education published a College Scorecard website containing a cornucopia of data about universities. The government generated the numbers by matching individuals’ student-loan applications to their subsequent tax returns, making it possible to compare pupils’ qualifications and demographic characteristics when they entered college with their salaries ten years later. That information offers the potential to disentangle student merit from university contributions, and thus to determine which colleges deliver the greatest return and why. The scorecard, makes reference numbers for 'expected earnings' easy accessible and in order to calculate 'median earnings' evaluation method used to run the scorecard’s earnings data through a multiple regression analysis, a common method of measuring the relationships between variables.

== 2015 list ==
Rank	Name
Washington and Lee University	1
Babson College	2
Villanova University	3
Harvard University	4
Bentley University	5
Otis College of Art and Design	6
Lehigh University	7
Alderson Broaddus University	8
Texas A&M International University	9
California State University, Bakersfield	10

College and university rankings | Rankings of universities in the United States
