= Center for Public Leadership =

Academic research center

- Type: Education
- Established: 2000
- Director: Anthony Foxx
- Location: Cambridge, Massachusetts, United States
- Website: cpl.hks.harvard.edu

The Center for Public Leadership (CPL) is an academic research center at Harvard University that provides teaching, research and training in the practical skills of leadership for people in government, nonprofits, and business. The center works to prepare its students to exercise leadership in a world responding to a rapidly expanding array of economic, political, and social challenges. Located at Harvard Kennedy School, CPL was established in 2000 through a gift from the Wexner Foundation.

== Directors ==
Anthony Foxx currently serves as the director of CPL. Foxx is the Emma Bloomberg Professor of the Practice of Public Leadership at Harvard Kennedy School and previously served as the 17th U.S. Secretary of Transportation under President Barack Obama.

=== Past Directors ===
David Gergen, former presidential advisor who served during the administrations of Richard Nixon, Gerald Ford, Ronald Reagan, and Bill Clinton, served as CPL director from 2000 to 2018. Gergen was succeeded by American diplomat Wendy R. Sherman. Sherman directed CPL until early 2021, when she was appointed United States Deputy Secretary of State under President Joe Biden. Sherman was succeeded by Hannah Riley Bowles, the Roy E. Larsen Senior Lecturer in Public Policy and Management at HKS and Co-Director of the HKS Women and Public Policy program (WAPPP). In February 2022, former Massachusetts Governor Deval Patrick joined Bowles as a Co-Director of CPL. Patrick and Bowles served together as co-directors until 2024. Previous directors also include Max Bazerman and Ron Heifetz.

== Faculty and staff ==
CPL faculty affiliates include more than 40 faculty from across Harvard University, including Harvard Kennedy School, Harvard Business School, and the Harvard Graduate School of Education. The Center additionally employs more than 20 staff members supporting administration, research, events, engagement, fellowship support, and other Center activities.

== Fellowships ==
The Center for Public Leadership's fellowship programs provide tuition support and cohort-based co-curricular programming to students pursuing master's degrees at Harvard Kennedy School and other graduate schools across Harvard University. Fellowship programs include:

- Gabrielle Bacon Climate Leadership Fellowship — for students dedicated to preserving and enhancing our shared environment.
- Black Family Fellowship — for U.S. veterans and active duty military committed to public leadership.
- Emirates Leadership Initiative (ELI) Fellowship — for students from the United Arab Emirates and the Middle East looking to lead in a global marketplace.
- Equity Fellowship - for students to understanding and dismantling barriers to equity across society.
- George Leadership Fellowship — for joint-degree students at Harvard Kennedy School and Harvard Business School entering the private and public sectors.
- Gleitsman Leadership Fellowship — for entrepreneurs and agents of social change.
- David M. Rubenstein Fellowship — for outstanding students innovating in public policy and business.
- Wexner Israel Fellowship — for inspired and active mid-career students from Israel.
- Zuckerman Fellows Program — for outstanding students in business, law, and medicine.

== Research initiatives ==
The following research initiatives are based at the Center for Public Leadership:

- William Monroe Trotter Collaborative for Social Justice
- Social Innovation + Change Initiative
- Negotiation and Conflict Resolution Collaboratory
- Practicing Democracy Project
- The Leadership and Happiness Laboratory

== Hauser Leaders Program ==
The Hauser Leaders Program allows high-profile leaders from across sectors to join CPL for up to two semesters to advise students and lead events. Hauser Leaders spend their time on campus teaching skill-building and leadership development workshops, engaging with key external stakeholders, and advising students and alumni

== Gleitsman Program in Leadership for Social Change ==
Through a gift of $20 million from the estate of Alan Gleitsman, the center endowed the Gleitsman Program in Leadership for Social Change in 2007. The program supports the annual Gleitsman International Activist Award and Gleitsman Citizen Activist Award, Gleitsman Leadership Fellows, and social change scholarship.
