= Giovanna Negretti =

- Born: Vieques, Puerto Rico
- Education: Harvard Kennedy School (BFA, MPA)
- Occupation: Executive Director
- Years active: 1999–present

Giovanna Negretti is an American activist.

Negretti is the co-founder and former executive director of ¿Oiste?, a Latino political organization that works to increase the participation of Latinos in politics and public policy making in the United States.

Giovanna received the 2008 New Frontier Award by the John F. Kennedy Library Foundation and the Institute of Politics at Harvard, which honors young Americans who are changing their communities – and the country – through their commitment to public service. She was awarded for her contribution to advocacy and grassroots activism in the Latino community. She was also selected by the Hunt Alternatives Fund for its Prime Movers program, a fellowship for new leaders. In 2010, Giovanna received an Eisenhower Fellowship.

== Early life ==
Born in Puerto Rico, Negretti learned early on the use of a thick skin combined with compassion and persistence. From 1941 through 2001, her family's native island of Vieques was under US military control, its lands expropriated from the native inhabitants and used as a shooting range and dumping ground for non-conventional weapons by the US Navy. She witnessed the devastation to communities and the fragile ecological foundation of her island growing up and learned how to organize, protest and challenge authority effectively through the actions of those around her and later through her own advocacy at University.

Negretti graduated magna cum laude from Emerson College with a bachelor's degree in fine arts and holds a master's degree in public administration from the Harvard John F. Kennedy School of Government.

== Career ==
In 1992 Negretti moved to Massachusetts to attend college and went on to work as senior legislative aide for State Senator Dianne Wilkerson at a time when there was no visible Latino political leadership. She has since been active in a number of political campaigns include those of President Barack Obama, Howard Dean and Deval Patrick.

Noticing lack of impact by those most affected by redistricting, bilingual education, clean elections and civic participation, Negretti began working on a grassroots level to insure all citizens achieved a voice in the policies affecting them and their lives. This involved digging in and getting involved with Latinos, women and people of color and shepherding them through the political process through education, training, coaching and direct involvement. Negretti both teaches and maintains involvement.

Grassroots programs she's assisted in creating, supporting or mentoring include: National Congress for Puerto Rican Rights, Massachusetts Chapter of the National Boricua Human Rights Networks. By 1997, Negretti successfully organized several rallies and demonstrations in Washington, D.C. and elsewhere, including a National Day of Solidarity with the People of Vieques in 2000.

In 1999 she co-founded and became the executive director of ¿Oiste?, a US-based NGO with a mission to advance the political, social and economic standing of Latinos. Through its programs in leadership development, civic education, campaign training and advocacy, over one hundred clients have gone on to serve in government, causes and other political actions.

== Highlights ==
Negretti has been profiled and quoted on mainstream media outlets nationally and internationally on matters relative to leadership, public policy, politics, and public service, is listed as one of the 100 Most Powerful Women in Boston (May 2003).

In 2008, Negretti was presented the prestigious New Frontier Award by Caroline Kennedy on behalf of the Institute of Politics at the Harvard Kennedy School of Government and the JFK Library Foundation. She was also honored as the 2008 Prime Mover recipient, a national program that supports leaders who engage masses of people to create a more just society. In January 2010, Negretti was selected as one of nine Eisenhower Fellows thus allowing her to expand her global work and study the impact of identity as it relates to political participation.

Over the past several years Negretti has consulted with Dominican Republic President Leonel Fernández, worked with Sapientis, a non-profit organization focused on education in Puerto Rico. Additional work in South and Central America has focused on environmental issues and their impact on the local population.

In the Middle East and Southeast Asia she's worked with Feminist School and Change for Equality and other activist groups dedicated to securing women's rights in Iran. In Malaysia she designed and implemented candidate training for participants attending the Women's Islamic Initiative in Spirituality and Equality Conference for the American Society for Muslim Advancement.

In Europe she provided leadership training to young professionals seeking access to EU institutions, programs and funds via EU Access.
