= Dorothy Zinberg =

American scholar (1928–2020)

Dr. Dorothy Shore Zinberg
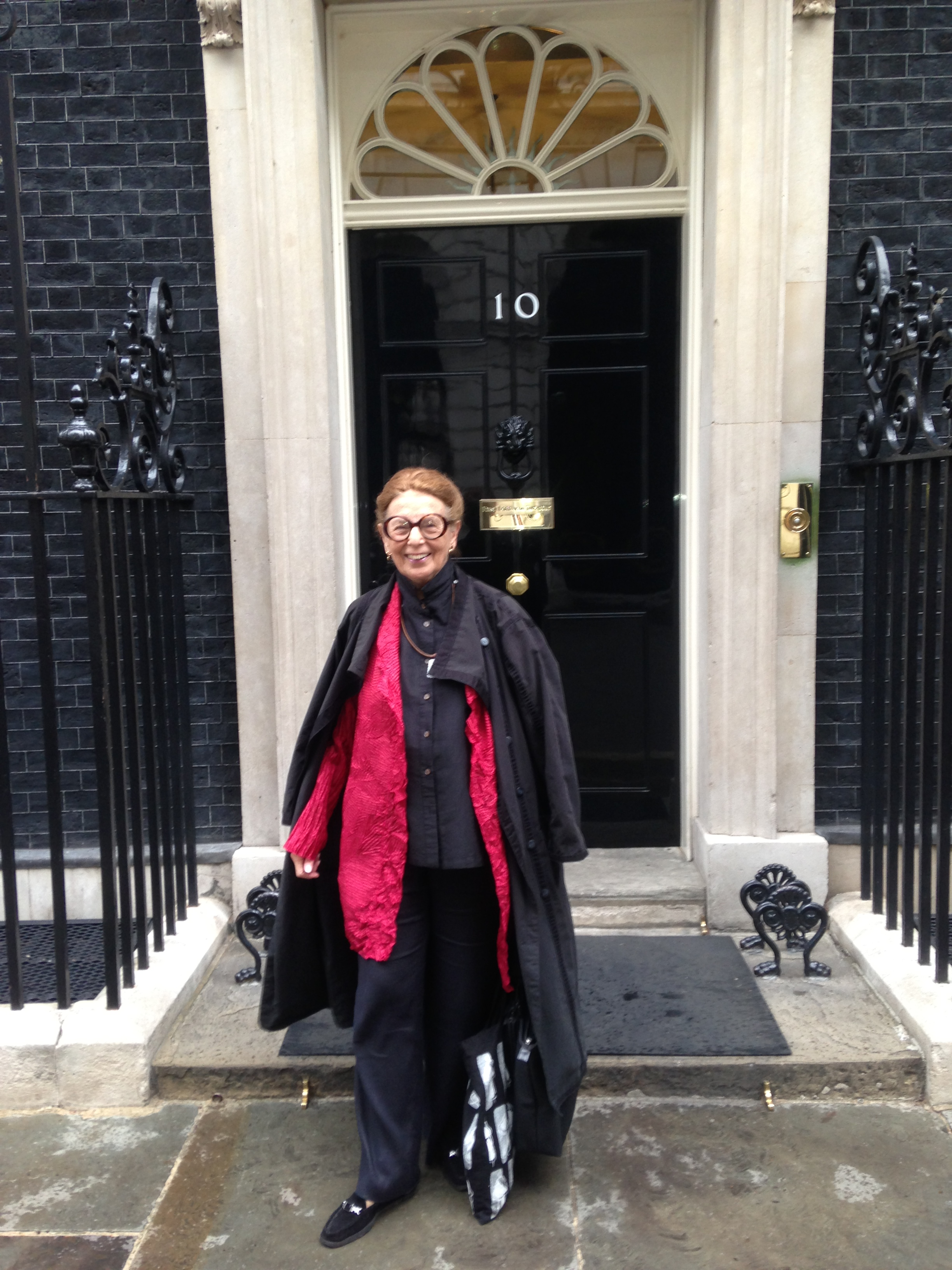
- Dorothy Zinberg outside of 10 Downing Street, London, in 2012
- Born: Dorothy Shore; February 25, 1928; Hyde Park, Massachusetts, United States
- Died: April 14, 2020 (aged 92); Cambridge, Massachusetts, United States
- Organization: Harvard Kennedy School
- Spouse: Norman Zinberg
- Children: 2 daughters

Dorothy Shore Zinberg was an American scholar at Harvard Kennedy School and an Elected Fellow of the American Association for the Advancement of Science. Zinberg taught in the sociology department at Harvard and continued to lecture at the Kennedy School. She trained as a biochemist and sociologist, and was a founding member of the Belfer Center for Science and International Affairs at the Kennedy School. Dorothy was married to Norman Zinberg, with whom she had two daughters, Annie and Sarah, from 1956 until his death in 1989. She maintained a close relationship with Julia Child.

== Biography ==
Zinberg was the daughter of Ernest and Esther Shore and attended Brookline High School. After graduating she received a Bachelor's degree in biology and chemistry, as well as a Master's in sociology from Boston University. She graduated from Harvard University with a PhD in sociology. She worked as a teaching and research assistant at Harvard Medical School and served as a visiting scholar at numerous international research institutions, including the Institute of Policy and Management at Chinese Academy of Sciences in Beijing, the Institute for Human Sciences in Vienna, and the National Institute for Science and Technology Policy in Tokyo.

Zinberg died Tuesday, April 14, 2020 of congestive heart failure.
