= What Will They Learn? =

- Editor: Michael Poliakoff
- Categories: Higher education
- Frequency: Annual
- Publisher: American Council of Trustees and Alumni
- First issue: 2009
- Country: United States
- Language: English
- Website: www.whatwilltheylearn.com

What Will They Learn? is the annual rating system of American colleges and universities published by the American Council of Trustees and Alumni, a conservative non-profit organization. The report, which evaluates the core academic requirements at over 1,100 public and private universities, has been published annually since 2009.

== Overview ==
What Will They Learn? was first published in 2009. The report assigns a letter grade to over 1,100 universities based on how many of the following seven core subjects are required: composition, literature, foreign language, American history, economics, mathematics and science. ACTA concludes that most of the country's leading universities do not have rigorous general education requirements.

== Editions ==
=== 2009–2010 ===
The first edition of the study looked at 100 schools across the nation. Only 5 institutions garnered an "A" rating, whereas 25 earned an "F." Among the "F" institutions were several schools traditionally considered elite, including Yale University.

=== 2010–2011 ===
In the 2010–2011 edition, ACTA expanded What Will They Learn? to include 718 institutions. The grades broke down to 17 "A's" (2%), 252 "B's" (35%), 209 "C's" (29%), 136 "D's" (19%) and 104 "F's" (14%).

=== 2011–2012 ===
The 2011–2012 edition of What Will They Learn? was released on August 30, 2011. The study evaluated the general education requirements of 1,012 colleges and universities. The grade breakdown percentages remained similar to previous years, with 19 schools earning an "A" grade.

=== 2012–2013 ===
The 2012–2013 edition of What Will They Learn? was released in October 2012. The study evaluated 1,070 colleges and universities, with 21 schools earning an "A" grade. Regent University, which received an "A" grade from ACTA, was subsequently awarded $400,000 by the Beazley Foundation in recognition of the school's strong core curriculum.

=== 2013–2014 ===
The 2013–2014 edition of What Will They Learn? was released in October 2013. The study evaluated 1,091 colleges and universities, with 22 schools earning an "A" grade. The 2013–2014 edition included the Foundation for Individual Rights in Education's campus free speech "Spotlight" rating alongside the What Will They Learn? grades.

=== 2014–2015 ===
The 2014–2015 edition of the study, which analyzed 1,098 institutions of higher learning, issued 23 "A" grades.

=== 2015–2016 ===
The 2015–2016 edition of the study, which analyzed 1,108 institutions of higher learning, issued 24 "A" grades.

=== 2016–2017 ===
The 2016–2017 edition of the study, which analyzed over 1,100 institutions of higher learning, assigned 25 "A" grades.

=== 2017–2018 ===
The 2017–18 edition of the study, which analyzed over 1,100 institutions of higher learning, assigned 24 “A” grades.

=== 2018–2019 ===
The 2018–19 edition marked the 10th anniversary of the study, which analyzed 1,120 institutions of higher learning and assigned 23 “A” grades.

=== 2019–2020 ===
The 2019–20 edition of the study, which analyzed 1,127 institutions of higher learning, assigned 22 "A" grades including its first "A" grade for Magdalen College of the Liberal Arts.

== The A-list ==
The 22 schools on the What Will They Learn? "A-List" for 2019–2020 include Baylor University, Bluefield College, Christopher Newport University, Colorado Christian University, Gardner-Webb University, Kennesaw State University, Magdalen College of the Liberal Arts, Morehouse College, Pepperdine University, Regent University, Southwest Baptist University, St. John's College (Annapolis/Santa Fe), Thomas Aquinas College, Thomas More College of Liberal Arts, United States Air Force Academy, United States Merchant Marine Academy, United States Military Academy, University of Dallas, University of Georgia, University of Science and Arts of Oklahoma, University of Saint Katherine, and Wyoming Catholic College.

== Response ==
Nationally syndicated columnist Kathleen Parker wrote that What Will They Learn? is a guide that can "help parents and students determine where they might get the best bang for their buck." The study has been featured in The Washington Post, The Wall Street Journal, and newspapers across the United States. Upon the report's release in 2009, the founder of U.S. News & World Report, Mel Elfin, reassured ACTA that the anger of some of the higher education establishment "is probably a sign that you are on the right track [to reform]."

In response to the strong performance of historically black colleges and universities, Michael Lomax, president of the United Negro College Fund, said "the ACTA review’s finding that historically black colleges and universities (HBCUs) ‘demonstrate overall stronger general education requirements than other public and private institutions’ confirms the important role these universities continue to play in American higher education.

In 2009, Debra Humphreys, vice president for communications and public affairs at the Association of American Colleges and Universities, said, "as is often the case with ACTA, they have posed some very good questions," but Humphreys criticized the study for being narrow in scope and called its methodology "inadequate."

ACTA countered that claim by commissioning a Roper study in 2011. The study found that 70 percent of Americans agreed with ACTA that all students should be required to take core curriculum classes. That number jumped to 80 percent among 25- to 34-year-olds who, according to the survey, are those "just out of college who may find learnings from such classes are helpful in the job market."

Murray Sperber of Indiana University said the report "documents higher education's dirty little secret: Schools are charging more each year and requiring many fewer traditional education courses. This results in a legion of students with spotty educations and meaningless degrees."
