= Susan C. Gardner =

Environmental scientist

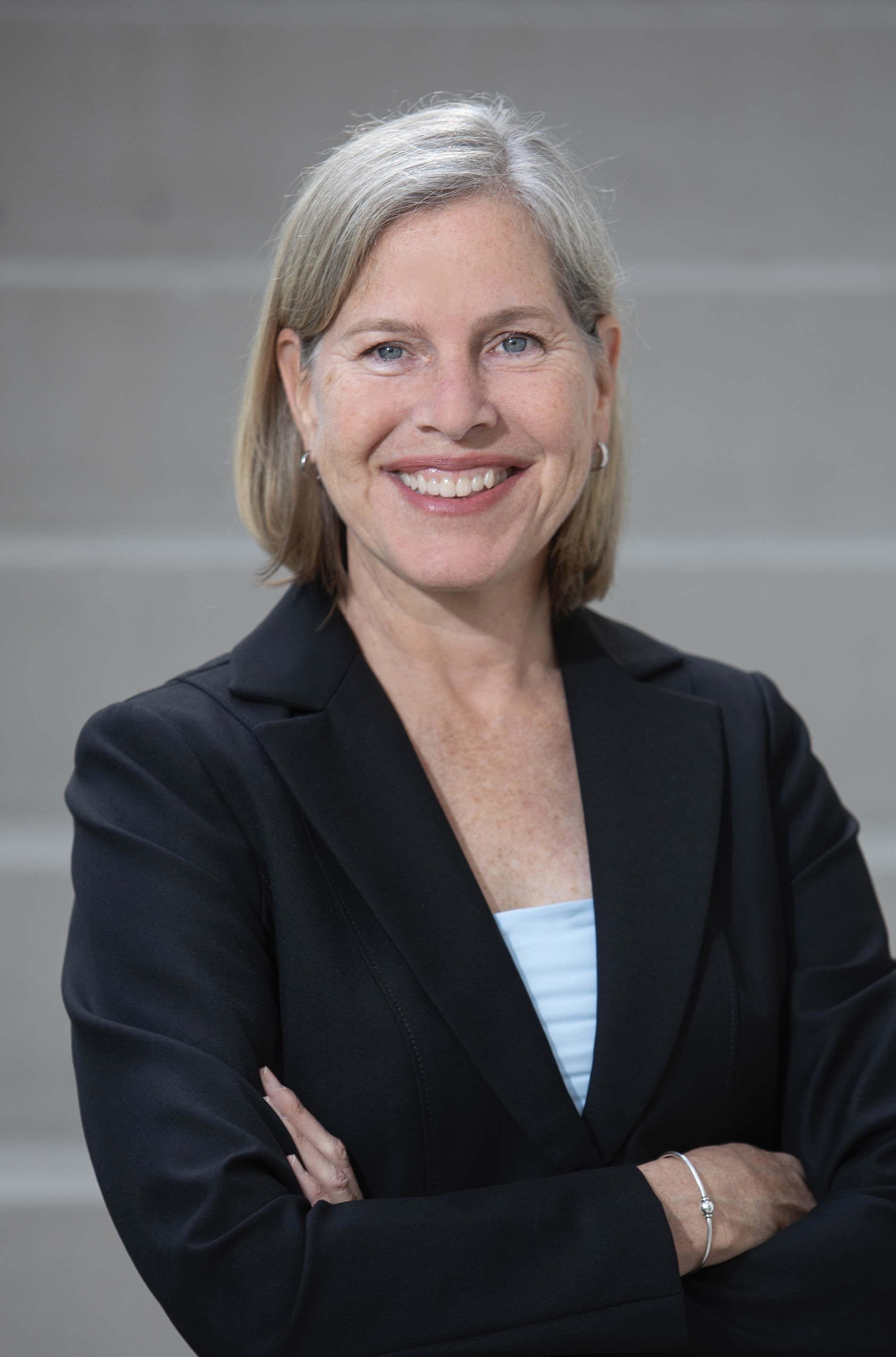

Director, Ecosystems Division at United Nations Environment Programme

Personal details
- Education: PhD
- Alma mater: Long Island University, Southampton Campus, North Carolina State University, University of Washington & Harvard Kennedy School
- Occupation: United Nations and Marine Scientist

Susan C. Gardner (born in 1967) is a Mexican-American marine scientist and environmentalist. She is Director of the Ecosystems Division at the United Nations Environment Programme based in Nairobi, Kenya.

== Education ==
Susan Gardner holds a Doctor of Philosophy in fisheries and aquatic sciences from University of Washington. She has a Master's of Science degree in toxicology from North Carolina State University and a Bachelor of Science degree in marine science from Long Island University, Southampton Campus .

== Career ==
Since 2019 Gardner has been the Director of the Ecosystems Division at the United Nations Environment Programme in Nairobi, Kenya. She leads global programmes to support countries in the implementation of nature-based solutions for sustainable development including for biodiversity protection, ecosystem restoration, and disaster risk reduction. Her work on ocean conservation included leading the process that achieved a global agreement to negotiate a treaty to end plastic pollution.

Prior, she served as Deputy Director and Chief of Staff for the U.S. Northeast Fisheries Science Center, National Oceanic and Atmospheric Administration in Woods Hole, USA (2012-2019) and as Deputy Director in the Office of Science and Technology Cooperation at the U.S. Department of State in Washington D.C., USA (2010-2012). As Deputy Director she led efforts on advancing women and girls in science and established the ASEAN-U.S. Science Prize for Women.

From 2006 until 2010, Gardner worked as AAAS Science Diplomacy Fellow and Senior Foreign Affairs Officer in the Bureau of Ocean, Environment and Science at the U.S. Department of State in Washington D.C., USA.

Gardner started her career as marine ecologist at the Center for Coastal Studies, School for Field Studies in Puerto San Carlos, Mexico (1996-2000), followed by a position for the Mexican Federal Government as marine scientist and programme director at the Centro de Investigaciones Biológicas del Noroeste in La Paz, Mexico (2000-2006) where Gardner created the agency’s first Marine Ecotoxicology Programme.

Gardner's research has generated scientific publications in the fields of marine ecology, natural resource management, protected species conservation, and fisheries. https://www.researchgate.net/profile/Susan-Gardner-12

== Awards and honors ==
- Special Act Award; Northeast Fisheries Science Center, NOAA 2015
- Quality Step Increase Award; U.S. Department of State 2010, 2012
- Gold Medal for Exceptional Services; U.S. Environmental Protection Agency 2010 (for Gardner's contribution to the Global Mercury Partnership and the Minamata Convention)
- Superior Honor Award; U.S. Department of State 2009
- Meritorious Honor Award; U.S. Department of State 2008
- Extra Mile Award; U.S. Department of State 2008
- Board Certified Fellow; Academy of Toxicological Sciences 2007-2010
- AAAS Science and Technology Policy Fellowship Award, AAAS 2006-2008
- Member of the Mexican National Association of Researchers (Sistema Nacional de Investigadores) 2002-2007
- Elected Vice President: Academy of Marine Ecology; CIBNOR 2005-2006
- National Research Council Associateship Program Fellowship 1995-1996
