= Peter V. Neffenger =

Former United States Coast Guard Admiral

Peter Neffenger
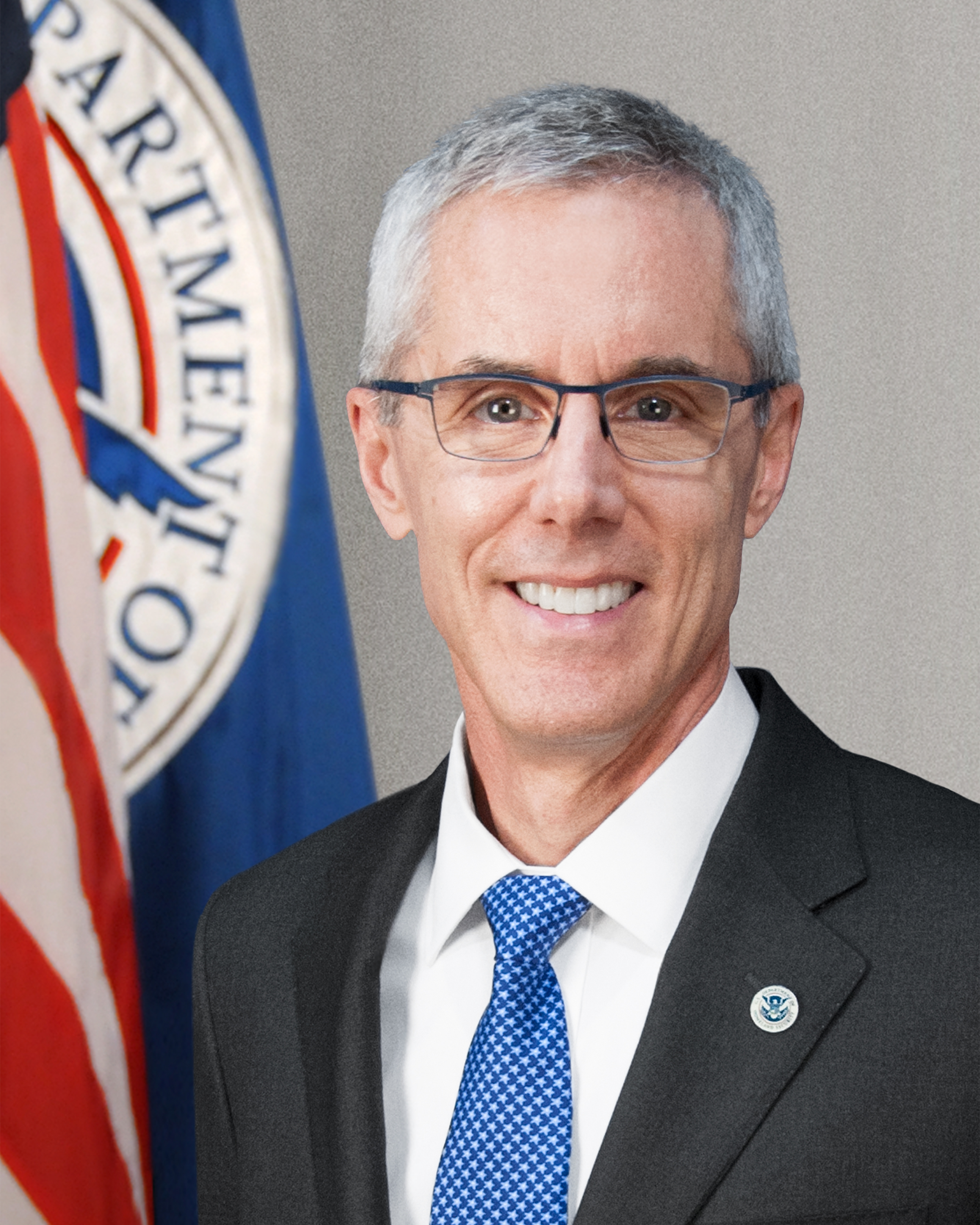

6th Administrator of the Transportation Security Administration
- In office July 6, 2015 – January 20, 2017
- President: Barack Obama
- Deputy: Mark Hatfield; Roderick Allison (acting); Huban A. Gowadia
- Preceded by: John S. Pistole
- Succeeded by: David Pekoske

Personal details
- Born: 1955 (age 70–71) Salem, Ohio, U.S.
- Education: Baldwin Wallace University (BA); Harvard University (MPA); Naval War College (MA); Central Michigan University (MA)

Military service
- Allegiance: United States
- Branch/service: United States Coast Guard
- Years of service: 1981–2015
- Rank: Vice Admiral
- Commands: Vice Commandant of the United States Coast Guard; Deputy Commandant for Operations; Deputy National Incident Commander, Deepwater Horizon Oil Spill; Commander, Ninth Coast Guard District; Commander, Coast Guard Sector Los Angeles – Long Beach

Peter Vance Neffenger (born 1955) is a retired United States Coast Guard vice admiral and public servant who served as Administrator of the Transportation Security Administration from July 2015 to January 20, 2017.

== Education ==
Neffenger earned a B.A. from Baldwin Wallace University. He holds an MPA from Harvard University, an MA in National Security and Strategic Studies from the United States Naval War College, and an MA in Business Management from Central Michigan University.

== Career ==
=== United States Coast Guard ===
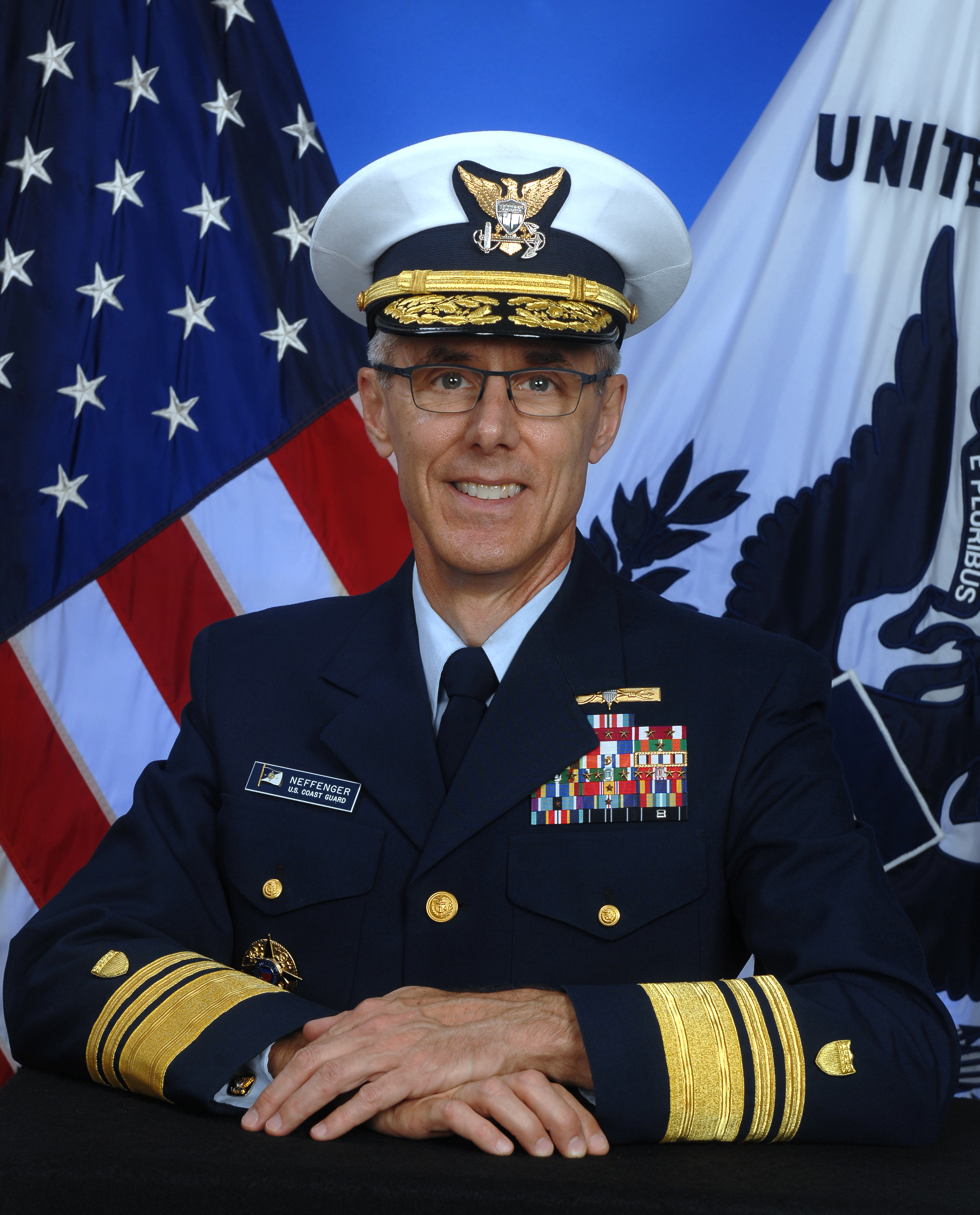
Neffenger's photo portrait as the Vice Commandant of the United States Coast Guard

Neffenger joined the Coast Guard in 1981 and was commissioned in 1982 through the Coast Guard Officer Candidate School. Vice Admiral Neffenger is a member of the Pacific Council on International Policy and a former fellow on the Senate Appropriations Committee.

Neffenger was a Vice Admiral in the United States Coast Guard, serving as Vice Commandant of the United States Coast Guard since May 20, 2014. He previously had served as Deputy Commandant for Operations, Deputy National Incident Commander for the 2010 Deepwater Horizon oil spill, Director of Coast Guard Strategic Management and Doctrine, Commander of the Ninth Coast Guard District, Commander of Coast Guard Sector Los Angeles – Long Beach, Captain of the Port and Federal Maritime Security Coordinator, Budget Officer of the Coast Guard, and Coast Guard Liaison Officer to the Territory of American Samoa.

=== Transportation Security Administration ===
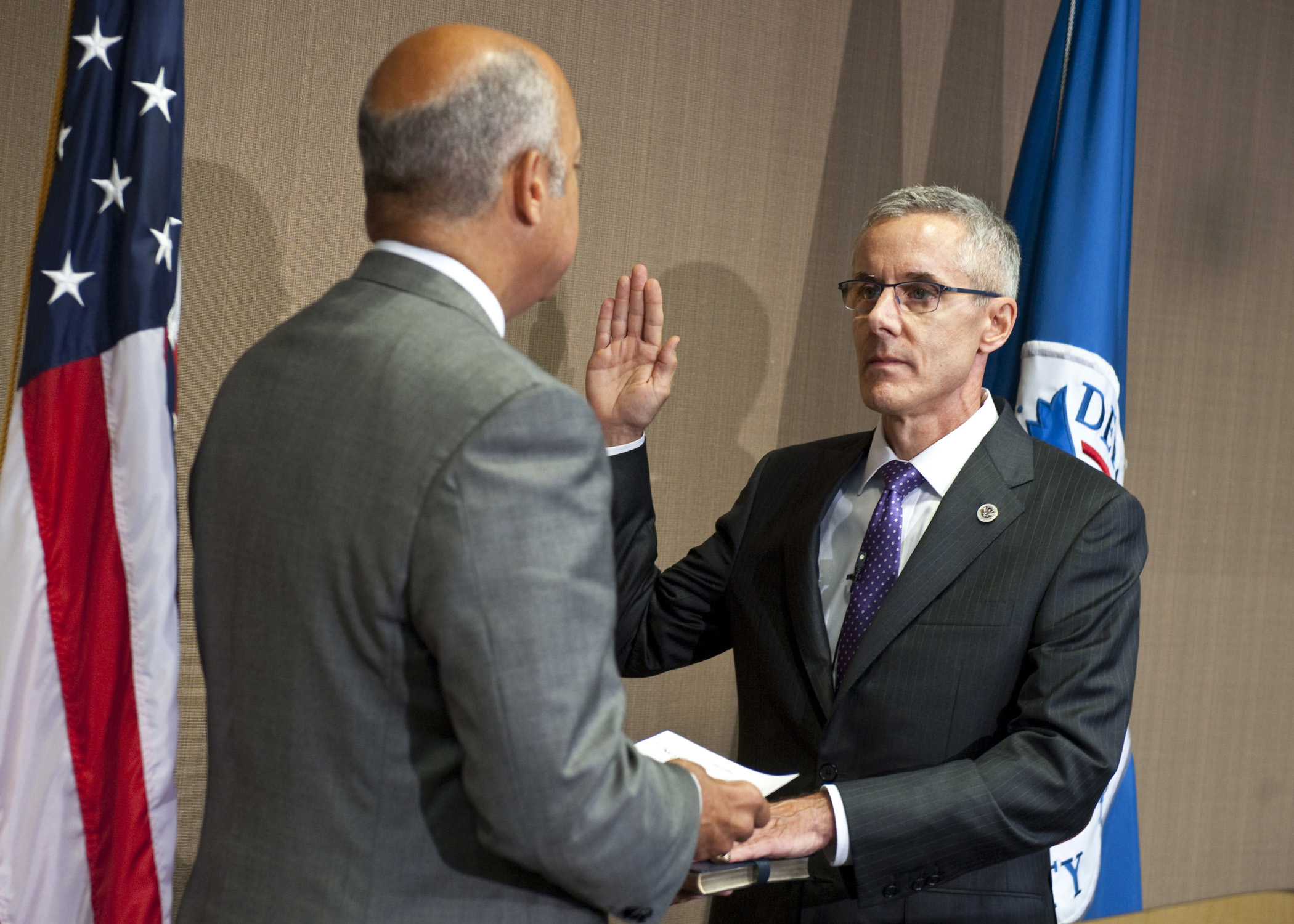
Neffenger is sworn in as the administrator of the Transportation Security Administration by Secretary of Homeland Security Jeh Johnson in a ceremony held at TSA headquarters in Arlington, Virginia on July 6, 2015.

On April 28, 2015, he was nominated by President Barack Obama to be the administrator of the Transportation Security Administration. On June 23, 2015, Vice Admiral Neffenger was confirmed by the Senate to be the next Administrator of the Transportation Security Administration (TSA). Department of Homeland Security Secretary Jeh Johnson released a statement on June 24: "Last night the Senate voted 81–1 to confirm Vice Admiral Peter Neffenger, the current Vice Commandant of the U.S. Coast Guard, to be the next Administrator of TSA. Admiral Neffenger understands the challenges we face, and I know he is ready to take them on at TSA. During his 30-year career in the Coast Guard, Admiral Neffenger proved himself to be an effective operator and commander. I have utmost faith in Pete Neffenger, and I am confident he will be a strong leader of TSA."

On March 22, 2016, a flight carrying Neffenger arrived at Brussels Airport during the dual bombing that occurred at the airport. Neffenger was in Brussels to meet with European Union counterparts. Testifying a few days later in front of the United States Senate Committee on Commerce, Science, and Transportation, Neffenger said, “I will tell you being there that day, seeing the devastation, seeing the chaos of the airport environment and the evil behind it was a stark reminder of the importance of the work we do every day to protect travelers.”

On January 20, 2017, upon the beginning of the Presidency of Donald Trump, Neffenger stepped down as Administrator as required by federal law as his term had expired with Barack Obama leaving office.

=== Other work ===
Since leaving TSA, Neffenger was a distinguished fellow at the Atlantic Council's Adrienne Arsht Center for Resilience from 2017 to 2019 and at Northeastern University's Global Resilience Institute.

In November 2019, Neffenger was appointed as a Director of AET, one of the leading global owners and operators of maritime transportation assets and specialized services.

In November 2020, Neffenger was a volunteer member of the Joe Biden presidential transition Agency Review Team to support Presidential transition efforts related to the Department of Homeland Security.

Previously, Neffenger was chairman of the Board of Directors of Smartmatic USA. He no longer serves on this board.

== Personal life ==
Neffenger resides in Washington, D.C.

== Awards and decorations ==
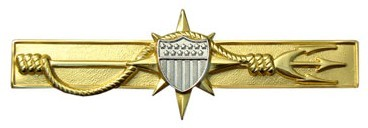

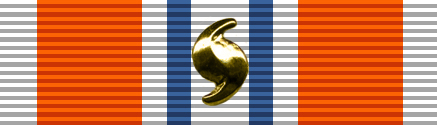

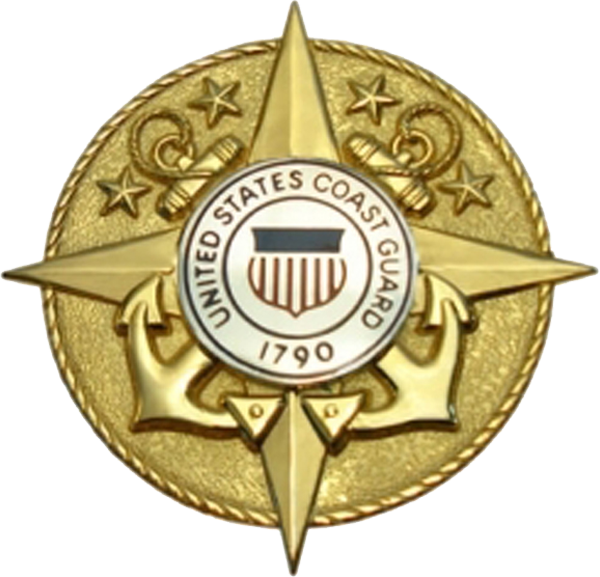

Military offices
Preceded by John Currier	Vice Commandant of the United States Coast Guard; 2014–2015	Succeeded by Charles D. Michel
Political offices
Preceded by Francis X. Taylor; Acting	6th Administrator of the Transportation Security Administration; 2015–2017	Succeeded by Huban A. Gowadia; Acting
