= Huban A. Gowadia =

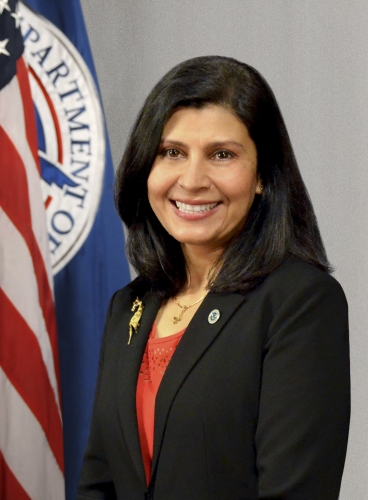

Acting Administrator of the Transportation Security Administration
- In office January 20, 2017 – August 10, 2017
- President: Donald Trump
- Preceded by: Peter V. Neffenger
- Succeeded by: David Pekoske

Personal details
- Born: 1969 (age 56–57)
- Education: University of Alabama; Penn State College of Engineering

Huban A. Gowadia (born c. 1969) is principal associate director of Global Security at Lawrence Livermore National Laboratory (LLNL) since February 2020.

She was formerly Deputy Administrator of the Transportation Security Administration from January 19, 2017 to May 2018, following the statutorily required resignation of Peter V. Neffenger on January 20, 2017, upon Donald Trump becoming President. Prior to joining TSA, Gowadia was the Director of the Domestic Nuclear Detection Office at the U.S. Department of Homeland Security. She was responsible for the Department of Homeland Security's (DHS) contribution to protect the United States from nuclear attack, where her focus was on nuclear forensics capabilities to detect, analyze and report on nuclear and other radioactive materials that are out of regulatory control.

Gowadia began her federal service with the Federal Aviation Administration in 2000, working on aviation security technologies and policy, where after September 11, 2001, she led TSA's initiative to replace all walk-through metal detectors at airports with enhanced systems.

== Career ==
Gowadia received a Bachelor of Science degree in Aerospace Engineering from the University of Alabama and a Doctorate of Philosophy in Mechanical Engineering from Pennsylvania State University.

On 17 March 2017, United States House Committee on Oversight and Reform issued a subpoena for TSA to provide information for an investigation about the handling of whistle blowers at the agency to Gowadia as acting director. The subpoena demanded her to appear no later than noon on 31 March 2017; Gowadia failed to appear. On 2 May 2017, Committee chair Rep. Jason Chaffetz, R-Utah, and Ranking Member Rep. Elijah Cummings, D-Maryland, issued a letter for failing to comply with the Congressional subpoena. DHS, parent organization of TSA, responded by sending a letter saying, "it was entitled to withhold documents on individual personnel cases on the grounds that the information was protected by attorney-client privilege". On 14 November 2017, Rep. Cummings asked Chairman Trey Gowdy to enforce the subpoena. Following the letter, Gowadia and others appeared for transcribed interviews.

Gowadia joined the Lawrence Livermore National Laboratory in May 2018 as the deputy principal associate director for Programs for the National Ignition Facility and Photon Science (NIF&PS) principal directorate. She worked with the NIF&PS Department of Defense Technologies program to engage industry and federal sponsors to form partnerships to address some of the nation's most pressing security issues. She also supported the development of cross-disciplinary initiatives within LLNL that can utilize NIF&PS technologies to enhance mission space in other directorates.
