= Christopher N. Avery =

American scholar

Christopher Norio Avery is an American public policy scholar, economist, and statistician who is the Roy E. Larsen Professor of Public Policy at the Harvard Kennedy School. His research focuses on the U.S. college admissions system. He holds degrees from Harvard College, University of Cambridge, and Stanford Business School.
