= List of Goucher College people =

Goucher College is a private liberal arts college in Towson, Maryland. It was originally established in 1885 as a women's college and became coeducational in 1986.

The following is an incomplete list of prominent Goucher people.

== Notable alumni ==
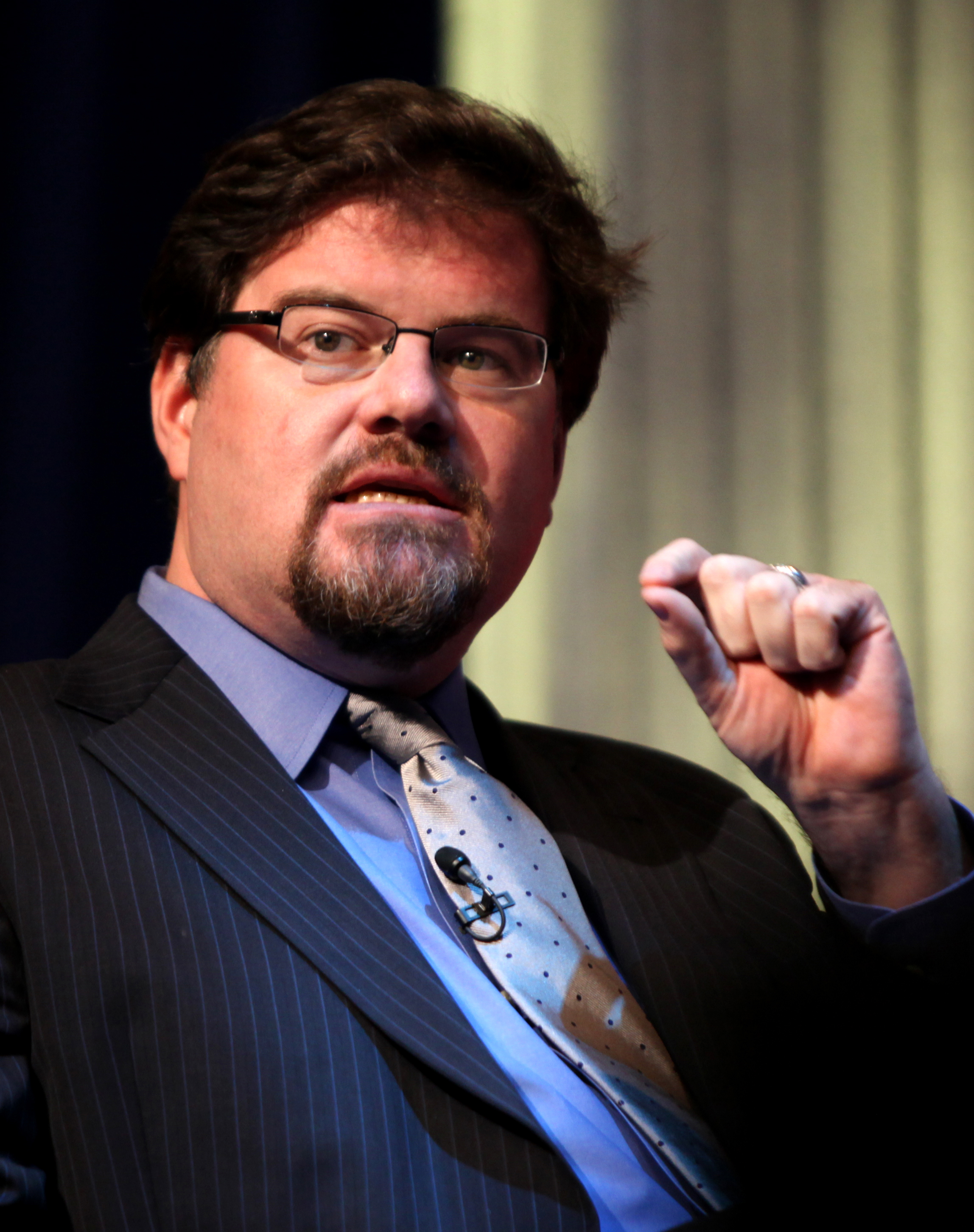
Jonah Goldberg, conservative commentator and National Review senior editor

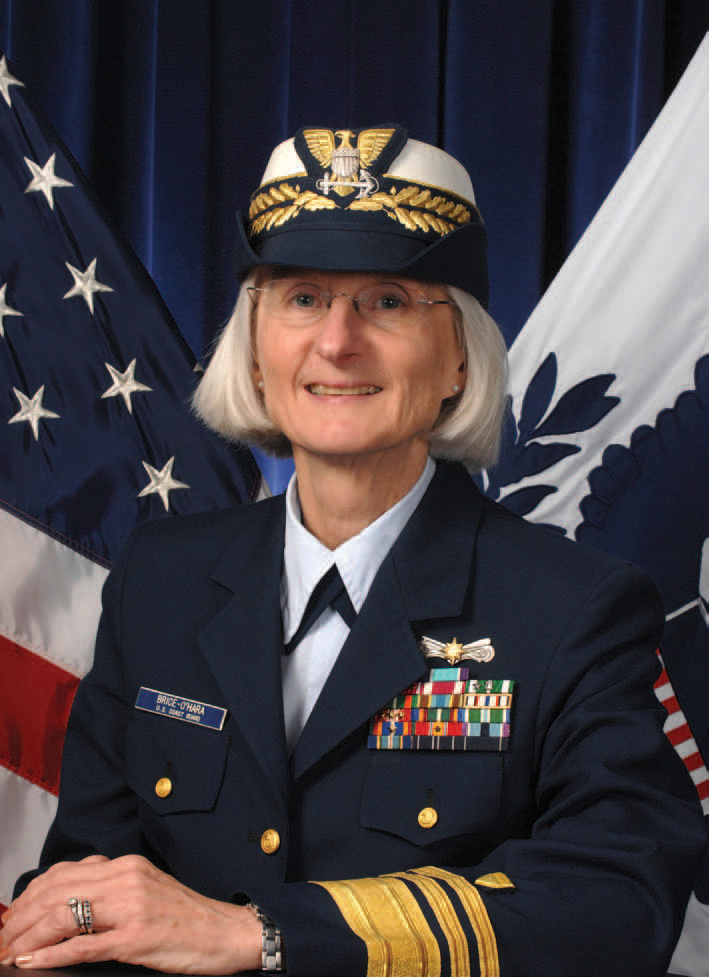
Sally Brice-O'Hara, 27th vice commandant of the United States Coast Guard

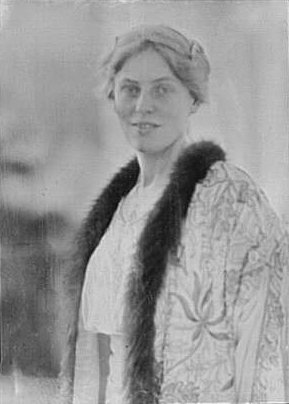
Jessie Woodrow Wilson Sayre, daughter of U.S. President Woodrow Wilson

Phyllis A. Kravitch, former United States circuit judge for the United States Court of Appeals for the Fifth Circuit and later for the Eleventh Circuit

Sarah T. Hughes, federal judge who administered the oath of office to Lyndon Johnson aboard Air Force One following the assassination of President John F. Kennedy

=== Law, government, and public affairs ===
- Sally Brice-O'Hara (1974), vice admiral and vice commandant of the United States Coast Guard
- Joan Claybrook (1959), president of Public Citizen, think tank founded by Ralph Nader
- Zeke Cohen (2008), Baltimore City Council member and president
- Rita C. Davidson (1948), first woman on the Maryland Court of Appeals
- Ellen Lipton Hollander (1971), federal judge for the United States District Court for the District of Maryland
- Sarah T. Hughes (1917), federal judge who administered the presidential oath of office to Lyndon B. Johnson following the assassination of John F. Kennedy
- Margaret G. Kibben, rear admiral, U.S. Navy (ret.), chaplain of the United States House of Representatives, chaplain of the United States Marine Corps
- Phyllis A. Kravitch (1941), federal judge for the U.S. Court of Appeals for the Eleventh Circuit
- Amy Kuhn, state representative in Maine
- Laurie McKinnon (1982), associate justice of the Montana Supreme Court
- Johnny Olszewski (2004), U.S. representative from Maryland's 2nd congressional district and former Baltimore county executive
- Kevin B. Quinn (2001), chief executive officer and administrator of the Maryland Transit Administration
- A. Margaret Russanowska (1912), social worker, US Department of Labor, film censor, Red Cross worker
- Jessie Woodrow Wilson Sayre (1908), daughter of U.S. President Woodrow Wilson and political activist
- Paula Stern (1967), former chairwoman of the United States International Trade Commission
- Lucé Vela (1982), former First Lady of Puerto Rico

=== Literature and journalism ===
- Ellen Bass (1968), poet
- Emily Newell Blair, writer, feminist, and co-founder of the League of Women Voters
- Sheri Booker, author and poet
- Andrew Ervin (1993), novelist and critic
- Margaret Fishback (1921), author and poet
- Jonah Goldberg (1991), author and conservative commentator
- Anne Lamott (attended for two years), memoirist
- Laura Amy Schlitz (1977), author, Newbery Medal and Newbery Honor winner
- Darcey Steinke (1985), author and university lecturer
- Eleanor Wilner (1959), poet, 1991 MacArthur Fellow

=== Scientists, physicians, psychologists, mathematicians, and researchers ===
- Beatrice Aitchison (1928), mathematician and transportation economist
- Hattie Alexander (1923), pediatrician and microbiologist
- Anne Bahlke (1926), physician, medical research, state public health official
- Ruth Bleier (1945), neurophysiologist, feminist scholar
- Teresa Cohen (1912), mathematician
- Nan Dieter-Conklin (1948), radio astronomer
- Helen Dodson Price (1927), astronomer, winner of the Annie J. Cannon Award in Astronomy
- Lois Feinblatt (1942), sex therapist
- Margaret Irving Handy (1911), pediatrician
- Helen C. Harrison (1931), winner of the John Howland Award and the E. Mead Johnson Award for work in pediatrics
- Ethel Browne Harvey, embryologist
- Marjorie G. Horning, biochemist and pharmacologist
- Georgeanna Seegar Jones (1932), reproductive endocrinologist
- Kate Breckenridge Karpeles (1909), United States Army doctor during World War I
- Harriet H. Malitson (1948), astronomer at Goddard Space Flight Center
- Grace Manson, psychologist
- Margaret McFarland (1927), psychologist and consultant to Mister Rogers' Neighborhood
- Florence Marie Mears (1917), mathematician
- Bessie Moses (1915), gynecologist and obstetrician
- Florence B. Seibert (1918), biochemist
- Lydia Villa-Komaroff, molecular biologist
- Jean Worthley (1944), naturalist

=== Academics and scholars ===
- Shirley Montag Almon (1956), economist
- Anna Crone, linguist and literary theorist
- Constance Prem Nath Dass (1911), first Indian president of Isabella Thoburn College
- Alice Deal (1899), first female school principal in the District of Columbia
- Amelia Frank, physicist, wife of Eugene Wigner
- Karen S. Haynes (1968), president of California State University, San Marcos
- Amy Hewes (1897), economist and professor at Mount Holyoke College
- Alice Kessler-Harris (1961), historian and professor
- Stephen Kimber, Canadian journalist and professor at University of King's College
- Melissa Klapper (1995), historian and storyteller
- Joan Maling, linguist and professor
- Nancy Mowll Mathews (1968), art historian
- Sara Haardt Mencken (1920), professor of English literature, wife of H. L. Mencken
- Elizabeth Nesbitt (1897–1977), children's librarian, library science educator
- Edith Philips (1913), educator and writer, 1928 Guggenheim Fellow
- Hortense Powdermaker (1919), anthropologist
- Elizabeth Barrows Ussher, Christian missionary and witness to the Armenian genocide

=== Arts and entertainment ===
- Nan Agle, children's books author
- Clara Beranger (1907), screenwriter, married to William C. DeMille
- Mildred Dunnock (1922), Oscar-nominated film and stage actress
- Alison Fanelli (2001), actress starring as Ellen on The Adventures of Pete & Pete
- Dustin Hodge, producer and writer
- Jesse J. Holland (2012), journalist, author, and guest host on C-SPAN's Washington Journal
- Anne Hummert (née. Schumacher) (1925), creator of leading radio soap operas during the 1930s and '40s
- Christine Jowers (1985), choreographer, producer, and dance critic
- Nancy Koenigsberg (B.A. degree 1949), sculptor and textile artist
- Jane Levy (attended for a semester), actress
- Selma L. Oppenheimer, Baltimore-based artist
- Mary Vivian Pearce, actress who worked with film director John Waters, considered one of the Dreamlanders
- Gabby Rivera (2004), author of fiction and graphic novels
- Ruddy Roye (1998), documentary photographer and Time magazine's pick for Instagram Photographer of 2016
- Rosalind Solomon (1951), artist and photographer

=== Business ===
- Katherine August-deWilde, former president of First Republic Bank from 2007 to 2015 and current vice chair
- Sally Buck, partial owner of the Major League Baseball team Philadelphia Phillies
- Sherry Cooper (1972), former chief economist at BMO Financial Group
- Olive Dennis (1908), civil engineer for B&O Railroad, first female member of the American Railway Engineering and Maintenance-of-Way Association
- Bradford Shellhammer (1998), eBay executive, co-founder of Fab.com and Queerty
- Elsie Shutt, one of the first women to start a software company in the United States

=== Sports ===
- Nathan Chen (post-baccalaureate premedical class of 2025), two-time Olympic gold medalist in figure skating
- Susan Devlin (1953), American-Irish badminton champion
- Matthew Forgues, racewalker
- Judy Devlin Hashman (1958), ten-time All-England badminton singles champion
- Emily Kagan, mixed martial artist

== Notable faculty ==
- Vasily Aksyonov, Soviet-Russian novelist
- Flo Ayres, radio actress
- Kaushik Bagchi, Indian historian
- Jean H. Baker, historian
- Robert M. Beachy, historian
- Dorothy Lewis Bernstein, mathematician
- Chrystelle Trump Bond, dancer, choreographer and dance historian
- Alice Braunlich, classical philologist
- Neil H. Buchanan, economist and legal scholar
- George Delahunty, physiologist and endocrinologist
- Rhoda Dorsey, historian
- Janet Dudley-Eshbach, academic administrator
- Andrew Ervin, author, critic and, editor
- Harriet Campbell Foss, painter
- Thomas French, journalist
- Marianne Githens, political scientist, author, and feminist
- Margret Grebowicz, Polish philosopher, author, and jazz vocalist
- Pamela Haag, author, historian
- Mildred Harnack, American-German historian, translator, and German Resistance fighter in Nazi Germany
- Elaine Ryan Hedges, writer and feminist
- Clark S. Hobbs, vice president
- Dustin Hodge, producer and writer
- Jesse J. Holland, journalist and author
- Ailish Hopper, poet, writer, and teacher
- Nancy Hubbard, author and public relations consultant
- Harry Mortimer Hubbell, classicist
- Julie Roy Jeffrey, historian
- Nina Kasniunas, political scientist and writer
- Elaine Koppelman, mathematician
- LaDema Langdon, botanist
- Suzannah Lessard, author
- Florence Lewis, mathematician and astronomer
- Robert Hall Lewis, composer
- Laura Lippman, author
- Oliver W. F. Lodge, British author and poet
- William Harding Longley, botanist
- Nina Marković, Croatian-American physicist
- Elizabeth Stoffregen May, economist and women's education advocate
- Maynard Mayo Metcalf, biologist
- Howard Norman, writer and educator
- Edith Philips, writer and French literary academic
- Richard Pringle, psychologist
- Victor Ricciardi, professor of business and author
- Alice S. Rossi, sociologist and feminist
- Mike Sager, journalist and author
- Forrest Shreve, botanist
- Martha Siegel, mathematician and educator
- Robert Slocum, botanist and biologist
- Eleanor Patterson Spencer, art historian
- Elizabeth Spires, poet
- Dorothy Stimson, historian of science
- Shira Tarrant, writer
- Ruth Dogget Terzaghi, geologist
- Bill Thomas, journalist
- Michelle Tokarczyk, author, poet, and literary critic
- Meline Toumani, author and journalist
- Sanford J. Ungar, journalist and academic administrator
- Robert S. Welch, academic administrator
- Juliette Wells, author and editor
- Lilian Welsh, physician, educator, suffragist, and advocate for women's health
- Mary Wilhelmine Williams, historian
- Ola Elizabeth Winslow, historian, biographer, and educator
- Jill Zimmerman, computer scientist
- Mary Kay Zuravleff, writer and novelist
- David Zurawik, journalist, author, and media critic

== Presidents ==
Since its founding, Goucher has had a total of 18 presidents, five of whom were acting. The college's longest-serving president was Rhoda Dorsey, who held the position for 20 years.

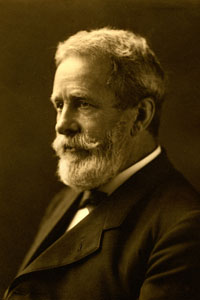
John Goucher, the college's namesake, was its second president.

| S. No. | Name | Term |
|---|---|---|
| 1. | William Hersey Hopkins | 1886–1890 |
| 2. | John Goucher | 1890–1908 |
| 3. | Eugene Allen Noble | 1908–1911 |
| * | John Blackford Van Meter | 1911–1913 |
| 4. | William Westley Guth | 1913–1929 |
| * | Hans Froelicher | 1929–1930 |
| * | Dorothy Stimson | 1930 |
| 5. | David Allan Robertson | 1930–1948 |
| 6. | Otto Kraushaar | 1948–1967 |
| 7. | Marvin Banks Perry Jr. | 1967–1973 |
| * | Rhoda Dorsey | 1973–1974 |
| 8. | Rhoda Dorsey | 1974–1994 |
| 9. | Judy Jolley Mohraz | 1994–2000 |
| * | Robert S. Welch | 2000–2001 |
| 10. | Sanford J. Ungar | 2001–2014 |
| 11. | José Antonio Bowen | 2014–2019 |
| * | Bryan Coker | 2019–2019 |
| 12. | Kent Devereaux | 2019–present |

Color key

Acting president (*)
