= E. Ruth Hedeman =

American solar astronomer

Emma Ruth Hedeman
- Born: November 25, 1910; Baltimore, Maryland, US
- Died: January 25, 2006 (aged 95); Annapolis, Maryland, US
- Education: Goucher College, University of Michigan
- Occupation: Solar astronomer

Emma Ruth Hedeman (1910 – 2006) was an American solar astronomer at McMath-Hulbert Solar Observatory in Michigan.

== Biography ==
Known as Ruth, she was born in Baltimore, Maryland, on November 25, 1910 to Emma Elizabeth Koppelman and Walter Rider Hedeman, and raised in Baltimore's Hamilton neighborhood. She graduated from Eastern High School in Baltimore in 1928, earned her B.A. from Goucher College in Baltimore in 1931 and her first master's degree (M.A.) in mathematics from Duke University in 1936. Her thesis there was Young-Stieljes integrals and Volterra-Stieljes integral equations.

Hedeman's professional career began as a teacher of elementary math, first at Goucher and then at Eastern High School. But with the start of World War II, she joined the U. S. Navy WAVES (Women Accepted for Volunteer Emergency Service) in 1942. She received training in atmospheric science and meteorology and then served as aerological officer at a military facility, the Naval Air Station in Klamath Falls, Oregon, and then in Seattle. She left the service in 1946 having risen to the rank of Lieutenant, Senior Grade.

=== Astronomer ===
After the war, Hedeman was awarded Goucher's Dean Van Meter Fellowship to pursue graduate studies in astronomy and earn a second master's degree (M.S.) in 1948 at the University of Michigan. There she began a decades-long career as a solar astronomer at the McMath-Hulbert Observatory, which was affiliated with the University of Michigan. Working with her colleague Helen Dodson Prince, the pair of astronomers co-authored many papers, some of which are still "considered important in the field of solar research."

According to her obituary in the Bulletin of the American Astronomical Society,

Among Hedeman’s many publications is her 1971 paper, “An Experimental Comprehensive Flare Index and Its Derivation for ‘Major’ Flares, 1955-1969,” co-written with Helen W. Dodson, which introduced the Comprehensive Flare Index (Upper Atmospheric Geophysics, Report UAG-14, World Data Center A, plus its updates UAG-52 in 1975 and UAG-80 in 1981). Other noteworthy publications are “Major Hα Flares in Centers of Activity with very Small or no Spots” (Solar Physics 13 (1970): 401-419); “Some Patterns in the Development of Centers of Solar Activity, 1962-66” (International Astronomical Union Symposium no. 35, 1968); and “Comments on the Course of Solar Activity during the Declining Phase of Solar Cycle 20, 1970-74” (Solar Physics 42 (1975): 121-130).

=== Later years ===
In 1987, she finally retired from the observatory after working there for nearly 40 years and took up residence in Falls Church, Virginia and later in Annapolis, Maryland.

Always an avid traveler, Hedeman did so extensively for business and pleasure. According to one obituary, "She attended conferences and gave talks at astronomy meetings, and in 1972 fulfilled her dream of completing an around-the-world journey." Apparently that trip did not include an exploration of the Panama Canal, which she regretted, until, "at age 86 and accompanied by a niece and nephew, she made that passage as well".

She died at age 95, on January 25, 2006, at her home in Annapolis, Maryland.

== Selected publications ==
She published her work using the name E. Ruth Hedeman.

=== Articles ===
- Dodson, Helen W., and E. Ruth Hedeman. "Major Hα flares in centers of activity with very small or no spots." Solar Physics 13.2 (1970): 401–419.
- Dodson, Helen Walter, E. Ruth Hedeman, and Marta Rovira de Miceli. 1972. NOAA. Reevaluation of solar flares, (1967). http://purl.fdlp.gov/GPO/gpo60763.
- Dodson, Helen Walter, and E. Ruth Hedeman. "Problems of differentiation of flares with respect to geophysical effects." (1964).
- Dodson, Helen W., and E. Ruth Hedeman. "The proton flare of August 28, 1966." Solar Physics 4.2 (1968): 229–239.
- Dodson, Helen W., E. Ruth Hedeman, and A. E. Covington. "Solar Flares and Associated 2800 Mc/sec (10.7 Cm) Radiation." The Astrophysical Journal 119 (1954): 541.
- Dodson, Helen W., and E. Ruth Hedeman. "Geomagnetic disturbances associated with solar flares with major premaximum bursts at radio frequencies 200 MC/S." Journal of Geophysical Research 63.1 (1958): 77–96.
- Dodson, Helen W., and E. Ruth Hedeman. "Geomagnetic disturbances associated with solar flares with major premaximum bursts at radio frequencies 200 MC/S." Journal of Geophysical Research 63.1 (1958): 77–96.
- Dodson, Helen W., E. Ruth Hedeman, and Leif Owren. "Solar Flares and Associated 200 Mc/sec Radiation." The Astrophysical Journal 118 (1953): 169.
- Dodson, Helen W., and E. Ruth Hedeman. "The Frequency and Positions of Flares Within Three Active Sunspot Areas." The Astrophysical Journal 110 (1949): 242.

=== Book ===
- An experimental comprehensive flare index and its derivation for" Major" flares, 1955-1969. Vol. 14., compiled by Helen W. Dodson and E. Ruth Hedeman; prepared by Research Laboratories, National Oceanic and Atmospheric Administration, Environmental Data Service. 1971.
