= William Hersey Hopkins =

American college administrator

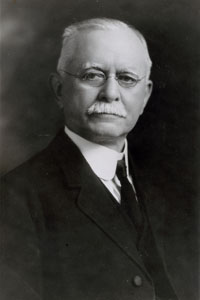

1st President of Goucher College
- In office 1886–1890
- Preceded by: Position established
- Succeeded by: John Franklin Goucher

Acting President of St. John's College
- In office 1884–1886
- Preceded by: John McDowell Leavitt

Personal details
- Born: December 20, 1841 Greensboro, Maryland
- Died: December 17, 1919 (aged 77) Chicago, Illinois
- Education: St. John's College, Annapolis
- Profession: College administrator; Academic

William Hersey Hopkins (December 20, 1841 – December 17, 1919) was an American academic who served as the first president of Goucher College and acting president of St. John's College in Annapolis, Maryland.

== Early life and education ==
Hopkins was born on December 20, 1841, in Greensboro, Maryland, to James Hopkins and Elizabeth Clarke Lyden. In 1851, his family moved to Annapolis, Maryland, and he enrolled at the preparatory school at St. John's College. He remained at the school for his post-secondary education, where his strong academic performance resulted in his being elected valedictorian of his class.

== Academic career ==
After his graduation in 1859, Hopkins was employed by St. John's as an instructor until the college's temporary closure during the Civil War. In the interim, he taught at Anne Arundel County Academy, later becoming its principal. In 1866, Hopkins returned to St. John's, eventually rising to the position of vice president. When St. John's then-president John McDowell Leavitt resigned in 1884, Hopkins was selected to serve as acting president. He held this position for two years and left in 1886 after accepting an offer to serve as the first president of the newly formed Women's College of Baltimore, now Goucher College.

As Goucher's first president, Hopkins played an influential role in its early formation. Prior to the college opening its doors in 1888, he conducted regular fundraising and worked to assemble the college's starting eight-member faculty, including co-founder John B. Van Meter. During his tenure, enrollment doubled from about 140 to over 280 and the school was recognized in an 1892 report by United States Commissioner of Education William Torrey Harris as a "Division A" college for women, along with 13 others.

Despite his efforts, Hersey described facing significant difficulties as a fundraiser, later saying the experience "nearly crushed him." Hopkins resigned in 1890 and was succeeded by John Franklin Goucher, who became the school's namesake upon its renaming in 1910. Hopkins remained on Goucher's faculty as a professor in classical studies.

== Personal life ==
In 1870, Hopkins married Eliza Brook Brady, who was also from Annapolis. In 1915, he was granted an honorary Doctor of Laws from Goucher.

Hopkins died on December 17, 1919, at his daughter's home in Chicago, Illinois, three days before his 78th birthday.
