= Harriet H. Malitson =

American astronomer

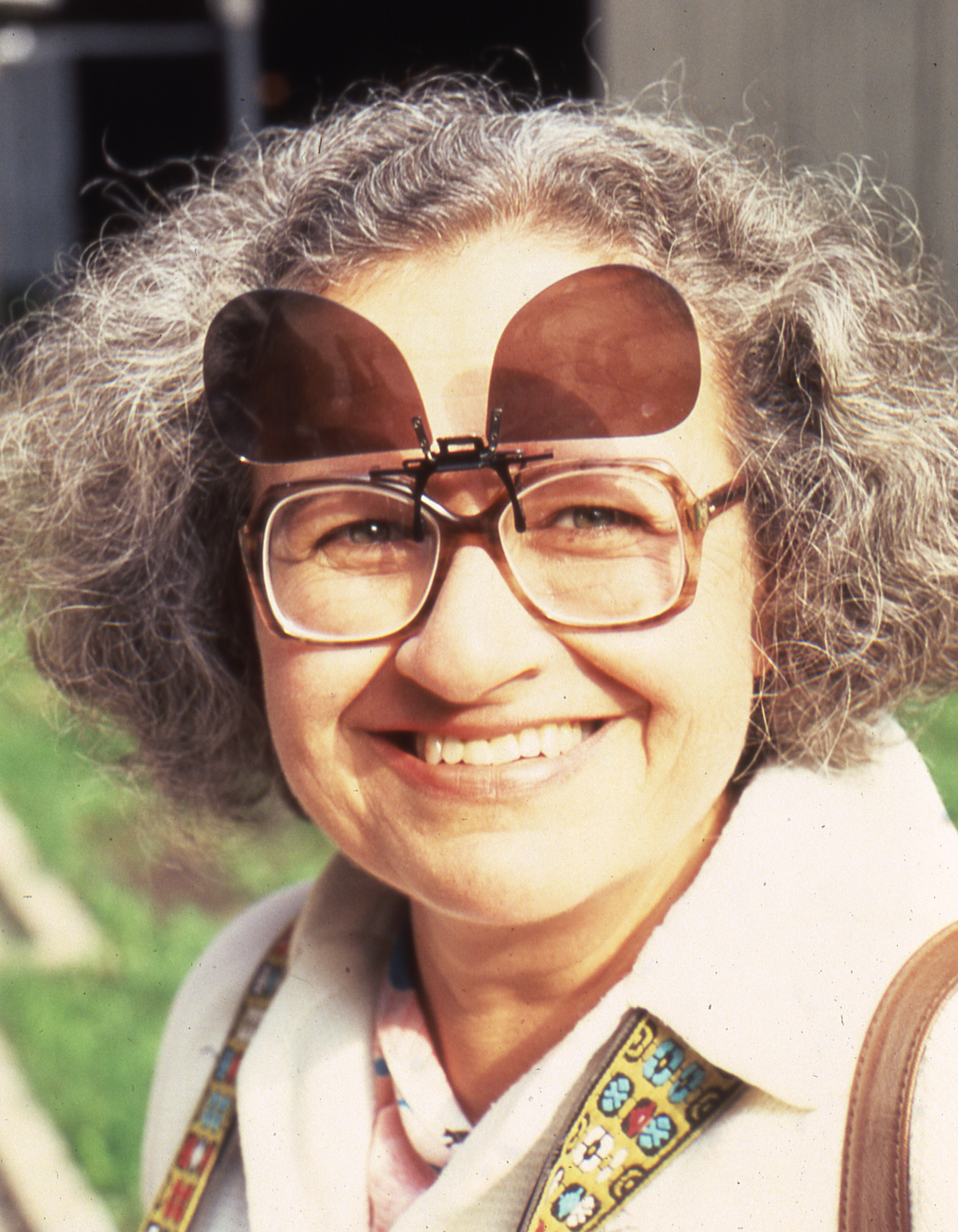
- Malitson in 1979
- Born: Harriet Hutzler; June 30, 1926; Richmond, Virginia
- Died: November 8, 2012 (aged 86); Washington, D.C.
- Education: Goucher College (B.A.); University of Michigan (M.S.)
- Scientific career
- Fields: Astronomy
- Workplaces: Goddard Space Flight Center; National Oceanic and Atmospheric Administration

Harriet Hutzler Malitson (June 30, 1926 – November 8, 2012) was an American astronomer. She was a solar researcher, employed at Goddard Space Flight Center and at the National Oceanic and Atmospheric Administration.

== Early life ==
Harriet Hutzler was from Richmond, Virginia, the daughter of Maurice Hutzler and Claire Levy Hutzler. The Hutzler family was Jewish. She attended Goucher College in Baltimore, where she studied astronomy under Helen Dodson, and became friends with another astronomy student, Nan Dieter-Conklin. She earned a Master of Science degree at the University of Michigan in 1951.

== Career ==
Harriet H. Malitson worked at Goddard Space Flight Center and at the National Oceanic and Atmospheric Administration during her career. When James E. Webb spoke to the General Federation of Women's Clubs in 1962, he mentioned Malitson by name as one of the women in a "position of importance" at NASA. She was again described in 1963 as one of the women doing "important and interesting work" at NASA in preparation for a human Moon landing. "It may well turn out that the yet-to-be-nominated Apollo astronauts who visit the moon later in this decade will owe their safety to Marcia (Neugebauer) and Harriet," commented one report that year on women in the space program. Of her own work, she explained, "We are striving to learn as much as we can about the sun's activities before the moon shot which will be affected by them." Malitson co-authored the Solar Proton Manual at Goddard in 1963, and data from that work was consulted in efforts to protect crewed space missions, including Apollo missions, from harmful radiation. She attended the International Astronomical Union (IAU) meeting in 1979, in Montreal. Within the IAU, she was a member of the High Energy Phenomena division, and the Sun and Heliosphere division.

== Publications ==
Malitson's publications included "Predicting Large Solar Cosmic Ray Events" (Astronomy and Aerospace Engineering 1963), "The Solar Energy Spectrum" (Sky and Telescope 1965), "The Solar Electromagnetic Radiation Environment" (Solar Energy 1968), "Type III Radio Bursts in the Outer Corona" (Solar Physics 1969), "A Density Scale for the Interplanetary Medium from Observations of a Type II Solar Radio Burst Out to 1 Astronomical Unit" (Astrophysical Journal 1973), and "Hectometric and kilometric solar radio emission observed from satellites in August 1972" (Space Science Reviews 1976). She also co-authored reports for NASA, including Solar Proton Manual (1963), and Observations of Solar Radio Bursts at 26.3 MC/S (1965).

== Personal life ==
Harriet Hutzler married fellow scientist Irving Herschel Malitson in 1951. They had two children. Harriet Hutzler Malitson died in 2012, aged 86 years, in Washington D.C. Her estate made a substantial contribution to the American Foundation for AIDS Research after her death. There is also an endowed scholarship named for Harriet H. Malitson at Goucher College.
