= The Separate Problem =

1979 book by Judy Jolley Mohraz

- Author: Judy Jolley Mohraz
- Language: English
- Genre: Nonfiction
- Published: 1979
- Publisher: Greenwood Press
- Publication place: United States
- Media type: Print
- Pages: 165
- ISBN: 9780313204111
- OCLC: 4056844

The Separate Problem is a 1979 book by Judy Jolley Mohraz. It is a collection of case studies of Black education in the Northern United States from 1900 to 1930.

== Reception ==
The book received mixed reviews by critics in academic journals. Leonard L. Hayes III, the director of the Desegregation Policy Studies Unit of the Institute for Services to Education remarked that “The Separate Problem is an excellent source for those persons in search of additional documentation of the efforts put forth by the North to deny blacks access to educational opportunities during the early part of the twentieth century." Hayes III added that "the author’s effective use of the case study methodology is laudable….although she did not make sufficient use of the rich vein of oral historical tools…” He found the writing style to be “lucid” and well organized except for interchangeably using the terms “Negro,” “black,” and “Black."

Diane Ravitch wrote that the book is flawed due to the author's ideological framework and suggests that the problems in the book may have been "mitigated" through the use of interviews with members of the African-American community.

Ronald D. Cohen of the Indiana Magazine of History wrote that the book "heavily influenced by recent revisionist interpretations." He added that the book is helpful but lacks detail. Cohen finds that the book relies on newspapers and public documents in such a way that the details of segregation are generalized. He concludes his review, stating that despite its flaws, the book is "important."

Robert G. Sherer from The American Historical Review finds that “both her [Mohraz] end and her means present theoretical and organizational problems.”
