= Bryan Coker =

American academic administrator

Bryan F Coker
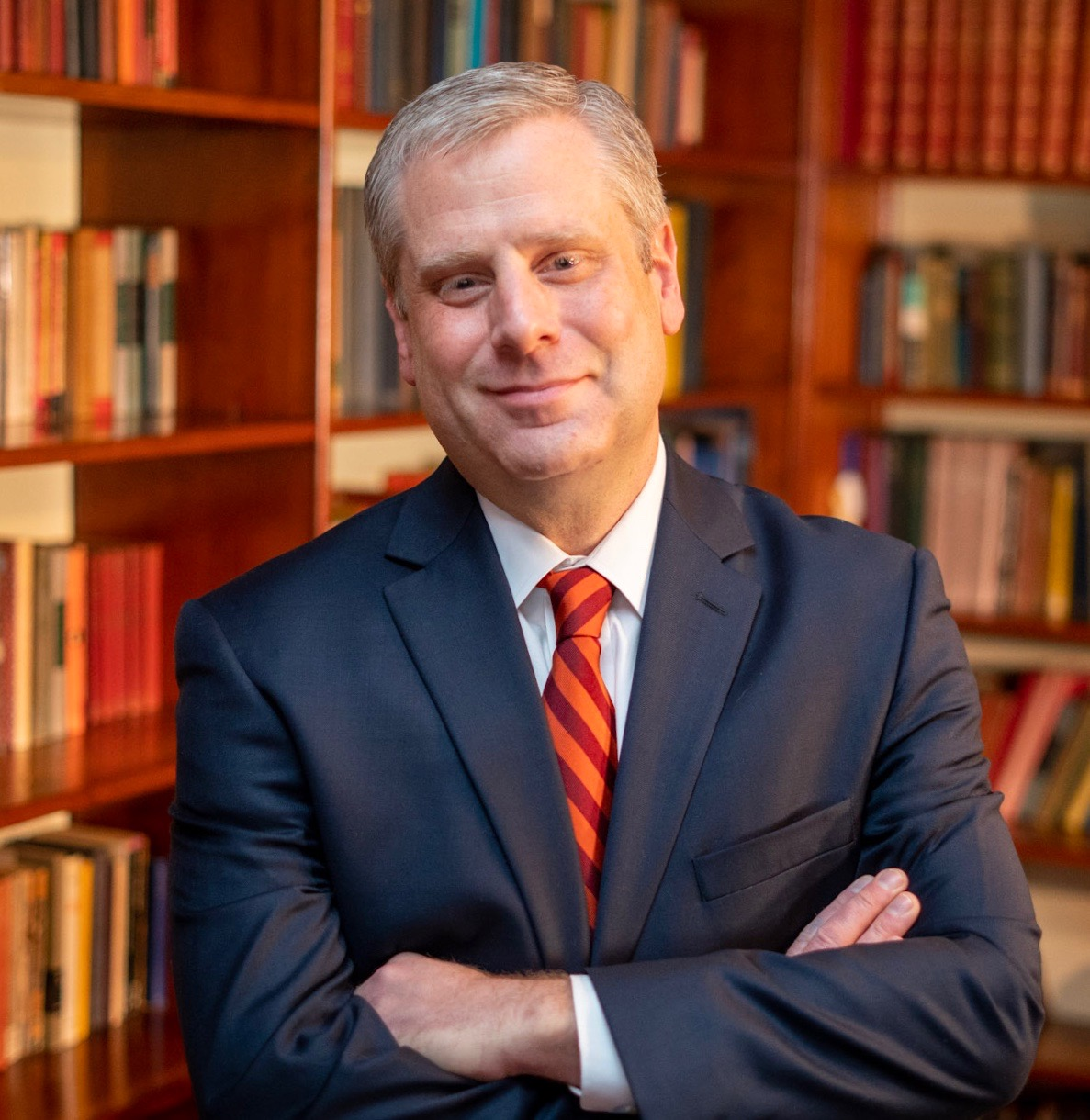

12th President of Maryville College
- Incumbent
- Assumed office July 1, 2020
- Preceded by: Tom Bogart

Acting president of Goucher College
- In office 2019 – 2019
- Preceded by: José Antonio Bowen
- Succeeded by: Kent Devereaux

Personal details
- Born: March 2, 1973 (age 53) Rutherfordton, North Carolina
- Spouse: Sara Barnette Coker
- Children: 4
- Education: Rhodes College (B.A.); University of South Carolina (M.Ed.); University of Tennessee (Ph.D.)
- Occupation: Academic administrator

Bryan F. Coker is an American academic administrator, and the 12th president of Maryville College. Coker was vice president and dean of students at Goucher College from 2013 to 2020, where he served as acting president during the summer of 2019. Coker was the dean of students at Jacksonville University from 2003 to 2013.

== Early life and education ==
Coker was raised in western North Carolina. He earned a Bachelor of Arts in psychology from Rhodes College. He was a classmate of Supreme Court Justice Amy Coney Barrett and they served together on the College Honor Council and as Resident Assistants. He was also a member of the Phi chapter of Kappa Sigma fraternity. Coker earned a master of education in student personnel services in higher education from University of South Carolina. In August 2010, he completed a Ph.D. in higher education administration from University of Tennessee (UT). His dissertation was titled, The Operationalization of the Doctrine of In Loco Parentis: The Administrative Council of the University of Tennessee in the Early 1920s and 1930s. Coker's doctoral advisor was Norma T. Mertz.

== Career ==
Coker worked for six years at UT-Knoxville, starting in student affairs administration, and from 1999 to 2003 served as the director of student judicial affairs. From 2003 to 2013, Coker was the dean of students at Jacksonville University.

On February 4, 2013, Coker succeeded Gail Edmonds as the vice president and dean of students of Goucher College, serving as the chief student affairs officer. Beginning in January 2017, Coker was an affiliated faculty member in the School of Education and Urban Studies at Morgan State University. In 2018, Coker graduated from the Council of Independent Colleges and American Association of State Colleges and Universities Executive Leadership Academy. He assisted Goucher president, José Antonio Bowen with the "Undaunted" capital campaign to raise $100 million. Coker served as the acting president of Goucher in the summer of 2019. He was also a peer evaluator for the Middle States Commission on Higher Education.

On July 1, 2020, Coker succeeded Tom Bogart as the president of Maryville College. Coker serves as a member of the National Collegiate Athletic Association Presidents Council.

He is leading efforts to plan and build the Lamar Alexander Institute for Environmental Education and the Sciences on Maryville’s campus. Tennessee Governor Bill Lee (Tennessee politician) proposed a State of Tennessee budget allocation to support the Institute, in Alexander's honor.

== Personal life ==
Coker met his wife, Sara Barnette Coker, at Rhodes College. They have four children. Sara Coker is the co-founder of a Jacksonville-based nonprofit that brought Afghan children to Florida for medical care. Coker is an ordained elder and liturgist in the Presbyterian Church (USA). The Cokers reside in the Oak Park Historic District of Maryville, Tennessee.
