= Otto Kraushaar =

American professor of philosophy and academic administrator (1901–1989)

6th President of Goucher College
- In office 1948–1967
- Preceded by: David Allan Robertson
- Succeeded by: Marvin Banks Perry Jr.

Personal details
- Born: Otto Frederick Kraushaar; November 19, 1901 Clinton, Iowa, U.S.
- Died: September 23, 1989 (aged 87) Baltimore, Maryland, U.S.
- Children: 1
- Education: University of Iowa (A.B., A.M.); Harvard University (Ph.D.)
- Profession: College administrator; Academic

Otto Frederick Krausharr (November 19, 1901 – September 23, 1989) was an American professor of philosophy who served as the 6th president of Goucher College. Kraushaar was also a professor at Smith College for 15 years.

== Early life and education ==
Kraushaar was born on November 19, 1901, in Clinton, Iowa, to Otto Christian Kraushaar and Mary Elizabeth Staehling. Kraushaar attended the University of Iowa, from which he earned a bachelor's degree in 1923 and a master's degree in 1927. He continued his graduate studies at Harvard University, earning a doctorate in 1933. His dissertation was titled Lotze's Theory of Knowledge.

== Career in academia ==
=== Professor at Smith College ===
While in graduate school, Kraushaar served as an instructor at Harvard and at the University of Kansas. Upon his graduation, he joined the faculty at Smith College, where he taught in the philosophy department for 15 years.

=== President of Goucher College ===
In 1948, Kraushaar left Smith to become president of Goucher College. Kraushaar led the school for 19 years and is credited with its emergence as a nationally recognized women's college. He was also responsible for overseeing the school's relocation from Baltimore to Towson, which was first initiated in the early 1920s by former Goucher president William W. Guth. While at Goucher, Kraushaar sought to increase racial and religious diversity at the school by lifting quotas on Jewish students that had been maintained under his predecessor and by supporting and encouraging African-American applicants.

=== Professional affiliations ===
Kraushaar served as a consultant to a Maryland commission on higher education and also with a gubernatorial task force on the public school system and race relations in the United States. He was a member of the United World Federalists, Americans for Democratic Action, and the American Civil Liberties Union.

== Selected written works ==
- American Non-Public Schools: Patterns of Diversity (1972)
- From the Puritans to the Present (1976)
- Schools in a Changing City: An Overview of Baltimore's Private Schools (1976)

== Personal life ==
In 1927, Kraushaar married Maxine MacDonald, with whom he had one daughter. He died at his home in Baltimore, Maryland, at the age of 87. Kraushaar was survived by his sister and five grandchildren.
