= Dorothy Stimson =

American historian of science (1890–1988)

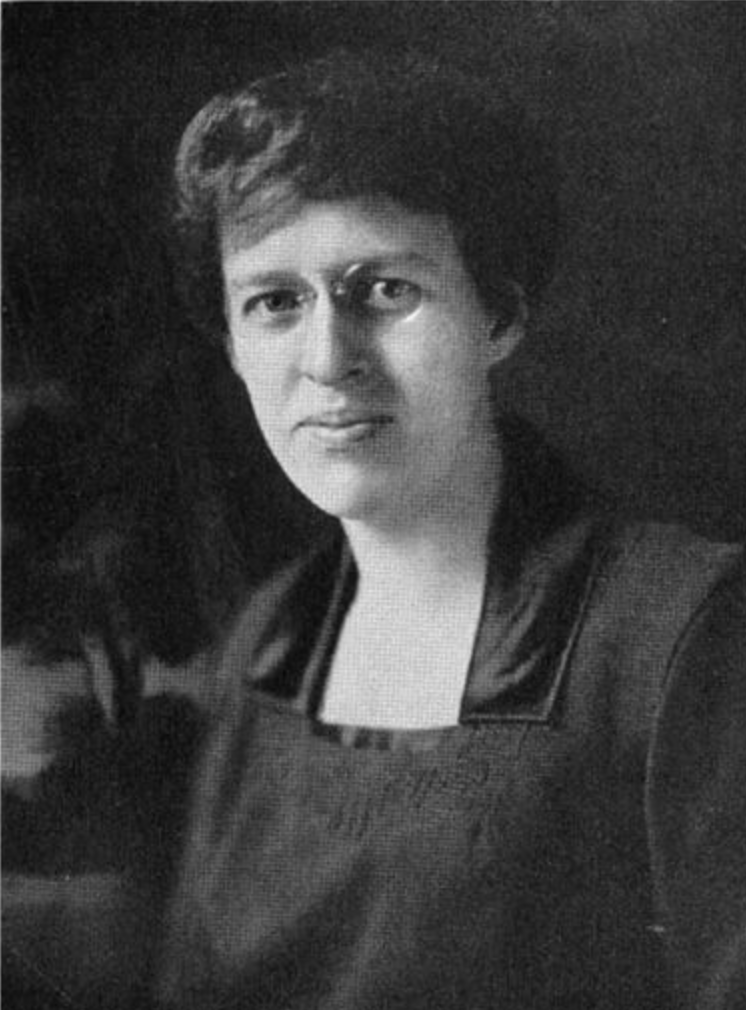
- Dorothy Stimson, from the 1926 yearbook of Goucher College

Acting President of Goucher College
- In office January 1930 – May 1930
- Preceded by: Hans Froelicher
- Succeeded by: David Allan Robertson

Dean of Goucher College
- In office 1921–1947

Personal details
- Born: October 10, 1890 St. Louis, Missouri
- Died: September 19, 1988 (aged 97) Owls Head, Maine
- Education: Vassar College (AB); Columbia University (MA, PhD)
- Profession: College administrator; Academic

Dorothy Stimson (October 10, 1890 – September 19, 1988) was an American academic. She served as the dean of Goucher College from 1921 to 1947, and Acting President Jan - May 1930, and was a professor of history at the college until 1955.

Stimson served as the president of the History of Science Society between 1953 and 1957. Her research included the reception of the Copernican theory. She also edited a collection of papers by George Sarton, considered to be the founder of the discipline of the history of science.

== Early life and education ==
Stimson was born in St. Louis, Missouri on October 10, 1890, to Henry Albert Stimson and Alice Wheaton. She was the granddaughter of a former president of Dartmouth College, and a cousin of former United States Secretary of War Henry L. Stimson. Stimson graduated from Vassar College in 1912 with a bachelor's degree. She later studied at Columbia University, from which she earned a master's degree in 1913 and doctorate in 1917. Her dissertation was titled The Gradual Acceptance of the Copernican Theory of the Universe. It was at the suggestion of James Harvey Robinson that Stimson pursued this subject.

== Career ==
Stimson was the dean of women at Goucher College from 1921 until 1947. She also served as a long-time professor of history at Goucher.

== Awards ==
- John Simon Guggenheim Fellowship for British History (1929)
