= Marta Graciela Rovira =

Argentine astrophysicist

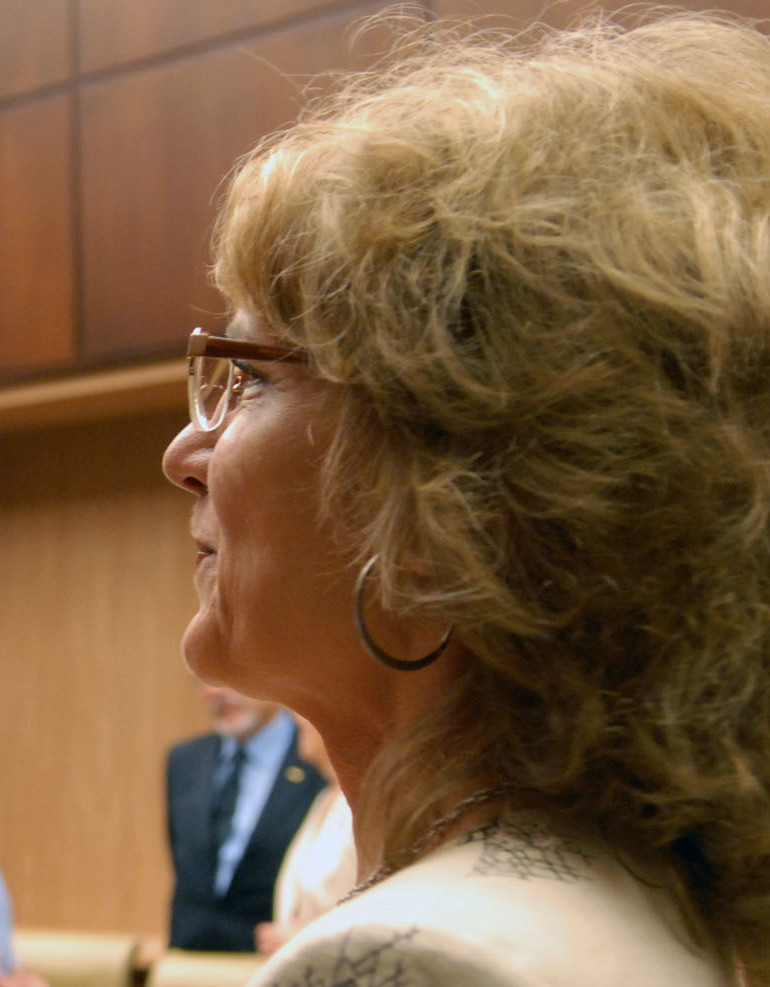
- Marta Rovira at the 50th anniversary of Conicet's creation.
- Education: University of Buenos Aires
- Occupations: President, CONICET

Marta Graciela Rovira is an Argentine astrophysics researcher and was first woman to be named president of CONICET, the government agency that directs and coordinates most of the academic research performed in universities and institutes throughout the country.

== Biography ==
Rovira anticipated a scientific career when she was still in high school because she had more interest in physics and math than for social subjects. In those days, though, students in Argentina were encouraged to pursue vocational training so her parents had her tested. By the time the family received the vocational test results, however, she had "already enrolled in math and science courses."

Rovira went on to earn her degree in physics and a PhD in Physical Sciences from the Faculty of Exact and Natural Sciences (University of Buenos Aires). After graduation she was offered a position at Observatory of Cosmic Physics, near Buenos Aires, which cemented her ambitions in astronomy. In an interview, she said her original research has been focused on "our closest star, the Sun. ... Since I started at the National Observatory of Cosmic Physics in San Miguel, my research area was always solar physics."

=== CONICET ===
Beginning in 1979, Rovira worked at Argentina's National Scientific and Technical Research Council (CONICET) and was appointed its president in 2008. CONICET is the primary science and technology organization for the country. As its president, Rovira was tasked with directing efforts at 12 scientific and technological centers in different regions of the country as well as numerous researchers. When she was asked to describe the effect of CONICET's 400 percent increase in government funding (from $100 million in 2003) over the next seven years, she said,

"And that made it possible for researchers, fellows and support and administrative personnel to enter the system. In other words, from 2003 to the end of 2010 the total number of people belonging to Conicet doubled. Including all categories, it was increased from 9,000 people in 2003 to more than 17,000 in 2010."

In 2012, she passed the presidency on to biochemist Roberto Salvarezza.

=== Leadership roles ===
- Director of the Institute of Astronomy and Physics of Space (IAFE) between 1995 and 2005
- President of the Argentina Association of Astronomy for three terms (1999, 2002 and 2005)
- Vice president of the International Astronomical Union, where she was elected to serve as the “Single Spot Contact” from Argentina
- President of the Latin American Association for Space Geophysics (ALAGE) between 1998 and 2004

She won a special mention by the Konex Awards, 2008.

== Selected publications ==
Rovira has authored more than 120 scientific articles.

- Cristiani, Germán, CG Giménez de Castro, Cristina Hemilse Mandrini, Marcos Emilio Machado, and Marta Graciela Rovira. "Asymmetric precipitation in a coronal loop as explanation of a singular observed spectrum." Advances in space research 44, no. 11 (2009): 1314-1320.
- Cristiani, Germán, Carlos Guillermo Giménez de Castro, Cristina H. Mandrini, Marcos E. Machado, Igor de Benedetto e Silva, Pierre Kaufmann, and Marta Graciela Rovira. "A solar burst submillimeter only spectral component during a GOES M class flare." cosp 37 (2008): 604.
- Paissan, Gabriel Hernan, Marta Graciela Rovira, and Guillermo Stenborg, "Cinematica de dos CMEs observadas en diferentes longitudes de onda en la baja corona." Asociacion Argentina de Astronomıa (2005): 97
- Lopez Fuentes, Marcelo Claudio, Cristina Hemilse Mandrini, Marta Graciela Rovira, and Pascal Démoulin. "The 3B / X3 solar flare of 27 February 1992." (2000).
- Dodson, Helen Walter, E. Ruth Hedeman, and Marta Rovira de Miceli. 1972. NOAA. Reevaluation of solar flares, (1967). http://purl.fdlp.gov/GPO/gpo60763.
