= Sanford J. Ungar =

American university president

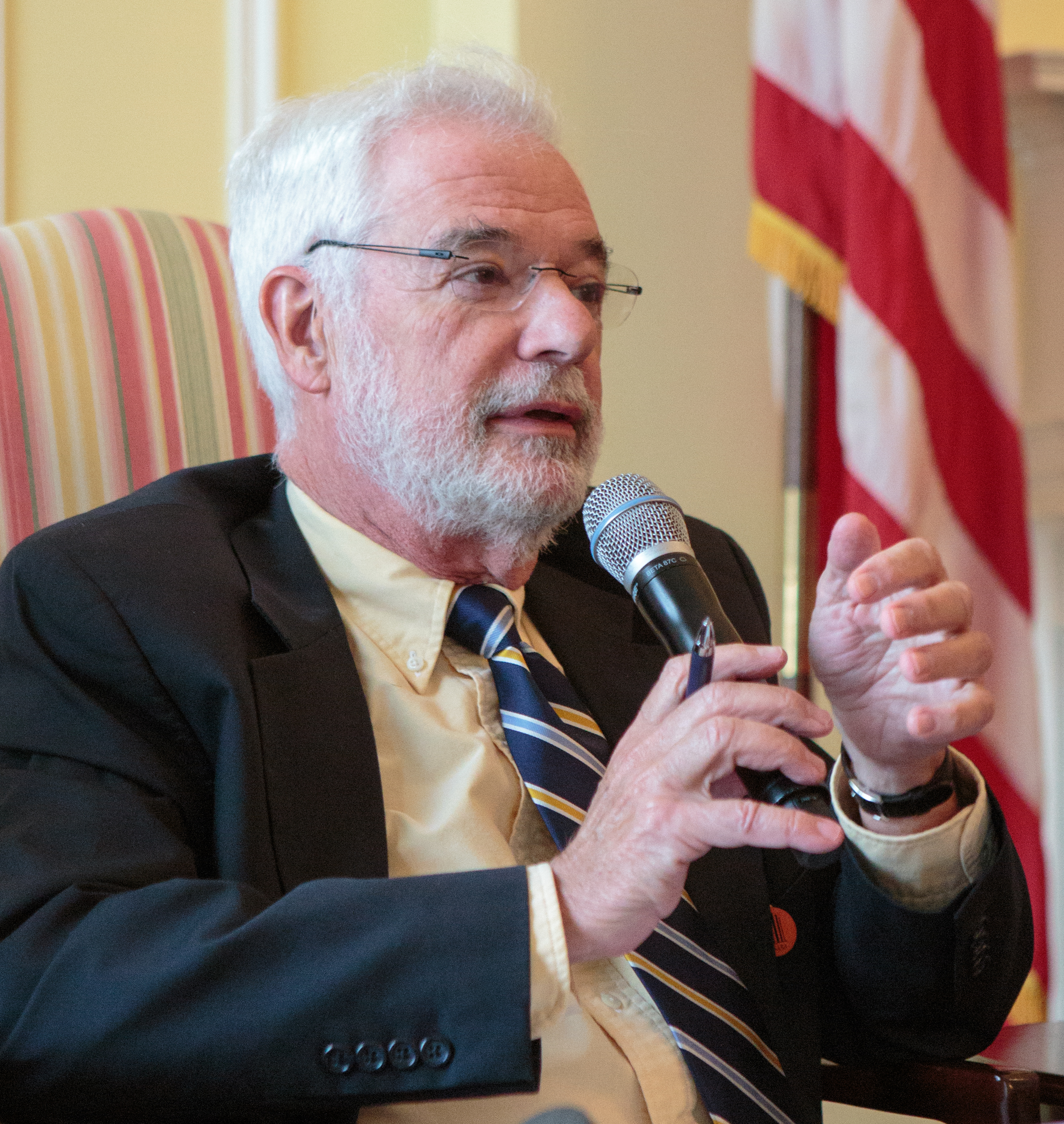

1st Director of The Georgetown University Free Speech Project
- Incumbent
- Assumed office 2014
- Preceded by: Position established

10th President of Goucher College
- In office July 1, 2001 – June 30, 2014
- Preceded by: Robert S. Welch (acting)
- Succeeded by: José Antonio Bowen

24th Director Voice of America
- In office 1999 – 2001
- Preceded by: Evelyn S. Lieberman
- Succeeded by: Robert R. Reilly

Dean of American University School of Communication
- In office 1986 – 1999

Weekday Host of All Things Considered
- In office 1980 – 1982
- Preceded by: Bob Edwards
- Succeeded by: Noah Adams

Personal details
- Born: 1945 (age 80–81)
- Spouse: Beth
- Children: Lida, Philip
- Education: Harvard University (AB); London School of Economics (MSc)
- Occupation: College administrator; Academic; Journalist

Sanford J. "Sandy" Ungar (born 1945) is an American journalist, author, and the inaugural director of the Free Speech Project at Georgetown University. He was the tenth president of Goucher College and the 24th director of Voice of America.

== Early life and education ==
Ungar was born in 1945, the youngest of five children. His mother, Tillie Landau, born 1901 in Chrenif, a small village near Lviv, Ukraine, (then the Austro-Hungarian province of Galicia) to a Jewish family; in 1908, the seven year-old Tillie immigrated with her family to Wilkes-Barre, Pennsylvania, to escape the poverty of her shtetl. His father, Max Ungar, born 1895 in Tussa, Kingdom of Hungary (now Tušice, Slovakia) to a Jewish family; around 1910, the 15-year-old Max immigrated to the United States where he served in World War I and later opened a grocery store. Ungar was raised in Kingston, Pennsylvania, where he attended Kingston High School. Several members of Ungar's family were killed in the Holocaust. As a child, Ungar was frightened by the stories told by several of his cousins who were Holocaust survivors.

Ungar obtained a bachelor's degree in Government magna cum laude from Harvard College and a master's degree in international history from the London School of Economics, where he was a Rotary Foundation fellow.

== Career ==
Upon completing graduate school, Ungar lived outside of the United States for three years. He initially intended to become a lawyer before becoming interested in "international opportunities." During his time abroad, he was a correspondent for United Press International in Paris and for Newsweek in Nairobi. Upon returning to the United States, Ungar began work as a print journalist for The Washington Post. He also wrote for The Atlantic and The Economist before working in an editorial position for the Foreign Policy. In 1975, he published FBI: An Uncensored Look Behind the Walls.

From 1980 to 1982, he was the weekday host of NPR's All Things Considered. He has also appeared on public, commercial, and cable television, as a commentator or as the moderator of debates. In 1985, Ungar published Estrangement: America and the World, a collection of essays he edited while a senior associate at the Carnegie Endowment for International Peace. Ungar has spoken frequently around the United States and in other countries on issues of American foreign policy and domestic politics, free expression, human rights, and immigration.

External videos
- Booknotes interview with Ungar on Fresh Blood, November 26, 1995, C-SPAN
- Presentation by Ungar on Fresh Blood at the U.S. State Department, August 2, 1999

From 1986 until 1999, he was Dean of the School of Communication at American University in Washington, D.C. In 1998, Ungar published Fresh Blood: The New American Immigrants. The following year he published another, Africa: The People and Politics of an Emerging Continent.

Ungar was the 24th director of the Voice of America, the U.S. government's principal international broadcasting agency, from 1999 to 2001. In that capacity, he oversaw more than 900 hours a week of VOA broadcasts in English and 52 other languages to some 100 million people around the world.

Ungar became the tenth President of Goucher College on July 1, 2001. In 2006, Ungar instituted a mandatory study abroad requirement for all students. Ungar resigned as president of Goucher on June 30, 2014, after being away on sabbatical.

In the fall of 2014, Ungar taught a freshman seminar as a visiting professor at Harvard College called Free Speech, a course he previously taught at Goucher. He joined the faculty of Georgetown University Spring 2015. At Georgetown, he is the director of the Free Speech Project which is a grant recipient of the John S. and James L. Knight Foundation. Ungar is a Lumina Foundation Fellow.

== Honors and awards ==
In 1972, Ungar won a George Polk Award for his book, The Papers & The Papers: An Account of the Legal and Political Battle over the Pentagon Papers. In May 1999 he was awarded an honorary Doctorate of Humane Letters by Wilkes University in his hometown of Wilkes-Barre, Pennsylvania. He has traveled widely in Europe, Africa, Latin America, and Asia; he is fluent in French and also speaks Spanish. He serves on the boards of the Institute for Christian and Jewish Studies and the Association of American Colleges and Universities, and is past chair of the Maryland Independent College and University Association. Mr. Ungar is also a member of the Council on Foreign Relations, and he is an appointed member of the U.S. Public Interest Declassification Board. In June 2000, at its annual convention in Buenos Aires, the Rotary Foundation gave him its Scholar Alumni Achievement Award.

== Personal life ==
Ungar lives in Baltimore and Washington with his wife, Beth Ungar, a physician in the practice of internal medicine. They have a daughter, Lida, and a son, Philip.
