= A. Margaret Russanowska =

Polish-American social worker

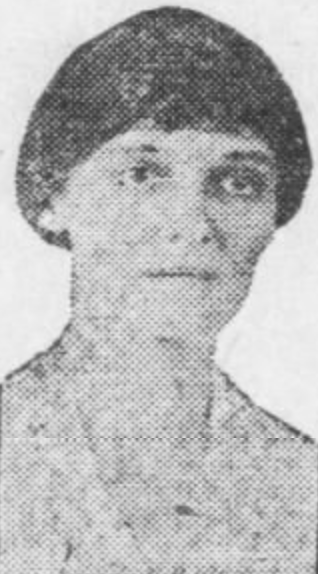
- A. Margaret Russanowska, from a 1921 newspaper
- Born: Apollonia Margaret Russanowska; November 30, 1885 near Warsaw, Poland
- Died: June 18, 1957; Baltimore, Maryland, US
- Occupation: Social worker

Apollonia Margaret Russanowska (November 30, 1885 – June 18, 1957) was an American social worker, born in Poland. She worked for the United States Department of Labor during World War I, for the American Red Cross in Poland after the war, and for the Maryland Board of Film Censors in the 1920s.

== Early life ==
Apollonia Margaret Russanowska was born near Warsaw, the daughter of Leonard Russanowski and Josephine Andrezjewska. She moved to the United States with her family as a small child, and was raised in Baltimore, Maryland with her younger sisters, Catherine and Josephine. She attended Goucher College.

== Career ==
During college, Russanowska began volunteering at a settlement house. She became assistant head resident at the United Neighborhood Guild, and spent time in Poland improving her spoken Polish and understanding of her home country's economic situation. In 1916, she spoke on "Social Agencies in Polish Communities," at the National Committee of Polish Social Workers meeting in Indianapolis.

In 1918, Russanowska was an investigator for the United States Department of Labor. She and Henry B. Diehlmann were sent to Ohio when the Cleveland Street Railway Company hired almost 200 women as substitute conductors for the public streetcars, to cover wartime shortages. The conductor's union (which did not admit women to membership) objected. Russanowska and Diehlmann's final report sided with the union, and the substitute conductors were dismissed.

Russanowska traveled in Europe with the American Red Cross to do postwar reconstruction work in 1920. While in Poland, she was director of a kindergarten and children's home for refugees in Bialystok, and helped 800 children evacuate by train to Warsaw and then to Liskow, ahead of the Russian line.

In 1921, Russanowska was appointed by the Maryland Board of Moving Picture Censors to serve as the inspector for Baltimore, under the auspices of the Women's Civic League. She was also general secretary of the Traveler's Aid Society in Baltimore in the early 1920s. From 1928 through 1940, she lived in Manchester, New Hampshire and worked for New Hampshire Children's Aid Society as a social worker.

== Personal life ==
Russanowska died in 1957, aged 71 years, in Baltimore.
