= Marvin Banks Perry Jr. =

American academic administrator (1918–1994)

4th President of Agnes Scott College
- In office 1973–1982
- Preceded by: Wallace McPherson Alston
- Succeeded by: Ruth A. Schmidt

7th President of Goucher College
- In office 1967–1973
- Preceded by: Otto Frederick Kraushaar
- Succeeded by: Rhoda Dorsey

Personal details
- Born: September 29, 1918 Powhatan, Virginia
- Died: December 12, 1994 (aged 76) Charlottesville, Virginia
- Children: 2
- Education: University of Virginia (A.B.); Harvard University (A.M., Ph.D.)
- Profession: College administrator; Academic

Marvin Banks Perry Jr. (September 29, 1918 – December 12, 1994) was an American academic and college administrator who served as president of Goucher College and Agnes Scott College. He also was a professor of English at Washington and Lee University and at the University of Virginia.

== Early life and education ==
Perry was born on September 29, 1918, in Powhatan, Virginia, to Marvin Banks and Elizabeth Gray Perry. He attended the University of Virginia, graduating with a bachelor's degree in 1940. Perry went on to attend Harvard University, from which he graduated with a master's in 1941 and a doctorate in 1950. Perry's dissertation was titled Keats and the Poets, 1815–1848: Studies in his Early Vogue as Reflected in the Verse Tributes and Allusions of His Contemporaries, and his doctoral advisor was Hyder Edward Rollins.

== Career ==
During his studies at Harvard, Perry served as a graduate instructor in English. After earning his doctorate, Perry returned to his alma mater, the University of Virginia, as a professor in English. He simultaneously taught at Washington and Lee University, where he eventually rose to the position of department chair in English. In 1952, he established the Elizabeth Gray and Marvin Banks Perry Memorial Fund at Washington and Lee.

In 1967, Perry was appointed to serve as president of Goucher College. His inauguration took place on May 3, 1968. He held this position for six years. In 1973, he resigned from Goucher to serve as president of Agnes Scott College, a position he held until his retirement in 1982.

== Later years ==
Perry died of cancer on December 12, 1994, at the age of 76. At the time of his death, he was residing at the Westminster-Canterbury of the Blue Ridge Retirement Home in Charlottesville, Virginia. He was survived by his wife, Ellen, and his children, Elizabeth and Margaret.

== Bibliography ==
- Musser, Frederic O. The History of Goucher College, 1930–1985. Baltimore: Johns Hopkins University Press, 1990.
