= John Goucher =

American missionary and academic (1845–1922)

The Reverend John Franklin Goucher
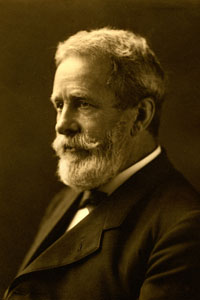

2nd President of Goucher College
- In office 1890–1908
- Preceded by: William Hersey Hopkins
- Succeeded by: Eugene Allen Noble

Personal details
- Born: June 7, 1845 Waynesboro, Pennsylvania
- Died: July 22, 1922 (aged 77) Pikesville, Maryland
- Resting place: Druid Ridge Cemetery, Pikesville, Maryland
- Children: 5
- Education: Dickinson College (BA)
- Profession: College administrator; Pastor; Academic

John Franklin Goucher (/ˈɡaʊtʃər/ GOW-chər; June 7, 1845 – July 19, 1922) was an American Methodist pastor and missionary and the namesake of Goucher College, formerly the Women's College of Baltimore City. He was one of the college's co-founders along with fellow clergyman John B. Van Meter and served as its second president.

== Early life and education ==
Goucher was born on June 7, 1845, in Waynesboro, Pennsylvania (Franklin County, Pennsylvania), as the last of four children to John Goucher and Eleanor Townsend. Periodic illness in his youth delayed his matriculation into high school, but Goucher nonetheless excelled in his studies and enrolled at Dickinson College 1864, from which he graduated in 1868.

== Career ==
=== Ministry and missionary work ===
Following his graduation from college, Goucher sought to become a Methodist minister, telling his friends that he felt a "commission from God" to "promote Christian education" and "work for the unification of American Methodism." In 1869, he was licensed into the ministry and was assigned to the Baltimore Conference to serve as a minister for the Methodist Episcopal Church in Baltimore County, Maryland. As his local reputation as a minister grew, Goucher eventually became more invested in missionary work, making numerous trips to China and Japan to help found and support mission hospitals and schools. He was also instrumental in the establishment of Aoyama Gakuin in Shibuya, Japan. Morgan State University also benefitted from land that Goucher deeded to the school during its early years.

=== Women's College of Baltimore City ===
In the late 19th century, Goucher played a seminal role in an effort to found a women's college in Baltimore, now Goucher College, a coeducational liberal arts college in Towson, Maryland. The school was chartered as the Women's College of Baltimore City in 1885 and opened three years later. Goucher and his wife made significant financial contributions towards the school's founding, which helped the fledgling institution secure a campus and begin building an endowment.

After first refusing, Goucher eventually agreed to become president of the school in 1890 and served in this capacity until 1908. In 1910 the school was renamed in his honor. As president emeritus, Goucher served on the college's board of trustees and participated in sustained fundraising efforts for the school.

== Personal life ==
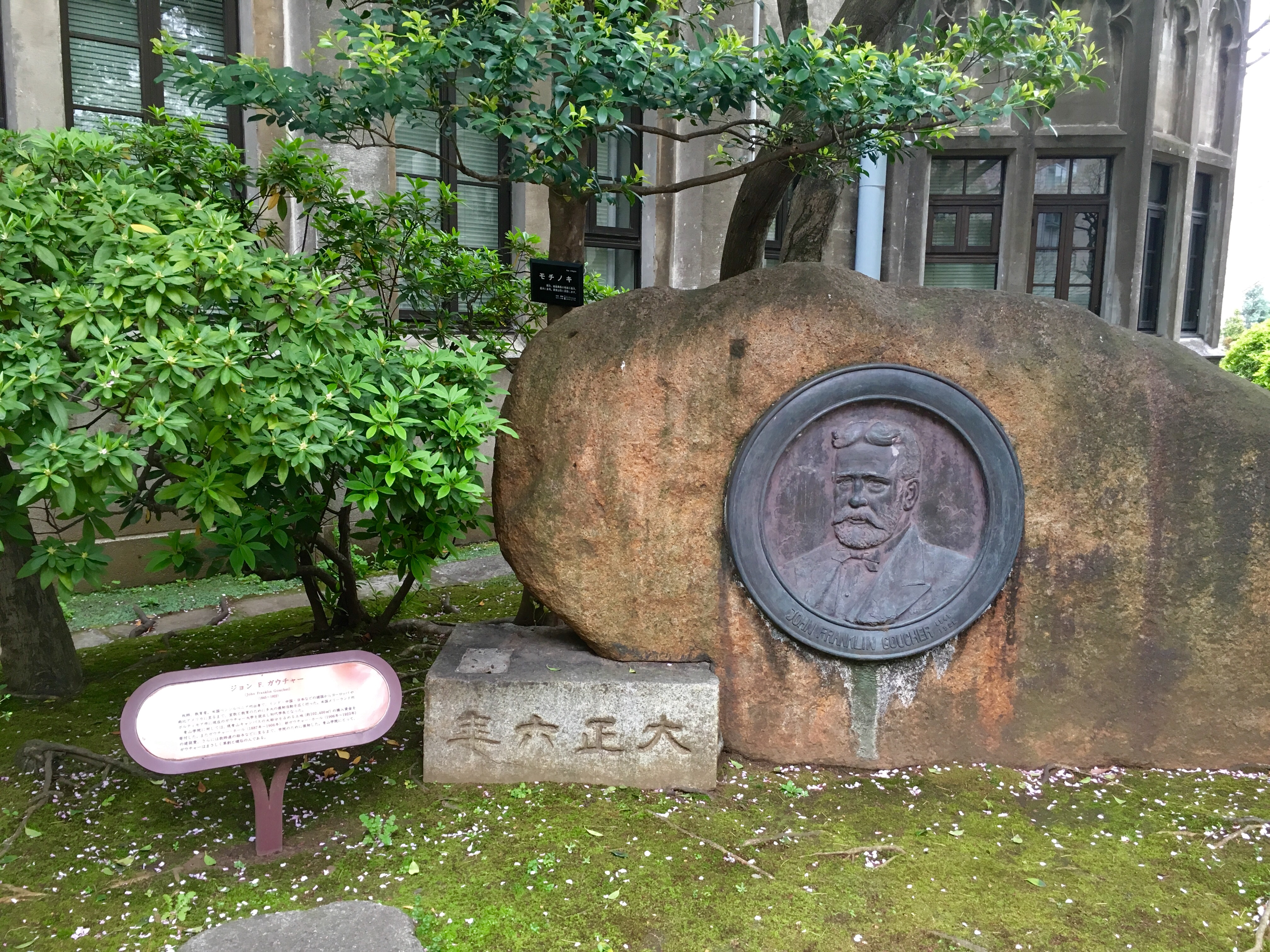
A monument to Goucher at Aoyama Gakuin University in Japan

In 1877, Goucher married Mary Cecilia Fisher (1850–1902), who was raised in Baltimore and was the daughter of a physician. Together they had five children. Goucher's health deteriorated after his resignation as president. However, he continued to travel around the world performing missionary work, making his last trip to China a year before his death. Goucher died of anemia at 77 on July 20, 1922, at his home in Pikesville, Maryland. He was buried at nearby Druid Ridge Cemetery.

== Selected works ==
- Goucher, John Franklin (1905). The Sunday school and missions, an address. New York: Young People's Missionary Movement. OCLC 34799062.
- Goucher, John Franklin (1905). Agencies working for the kingdom. Missionary Training School. OCLC 31164790.
- Goucher, John Franklin (1905). Young People and World Evangelization. Jennings and Graham.
- Goucher, John Franklin (1908). Christianity and the United States. Eaton & Mains.
- Goucher, John Franklin (1911). Growth of the Missionary Concept. Eaton & Mains.
