= Flo Ayres =

American actress (1923–2022)

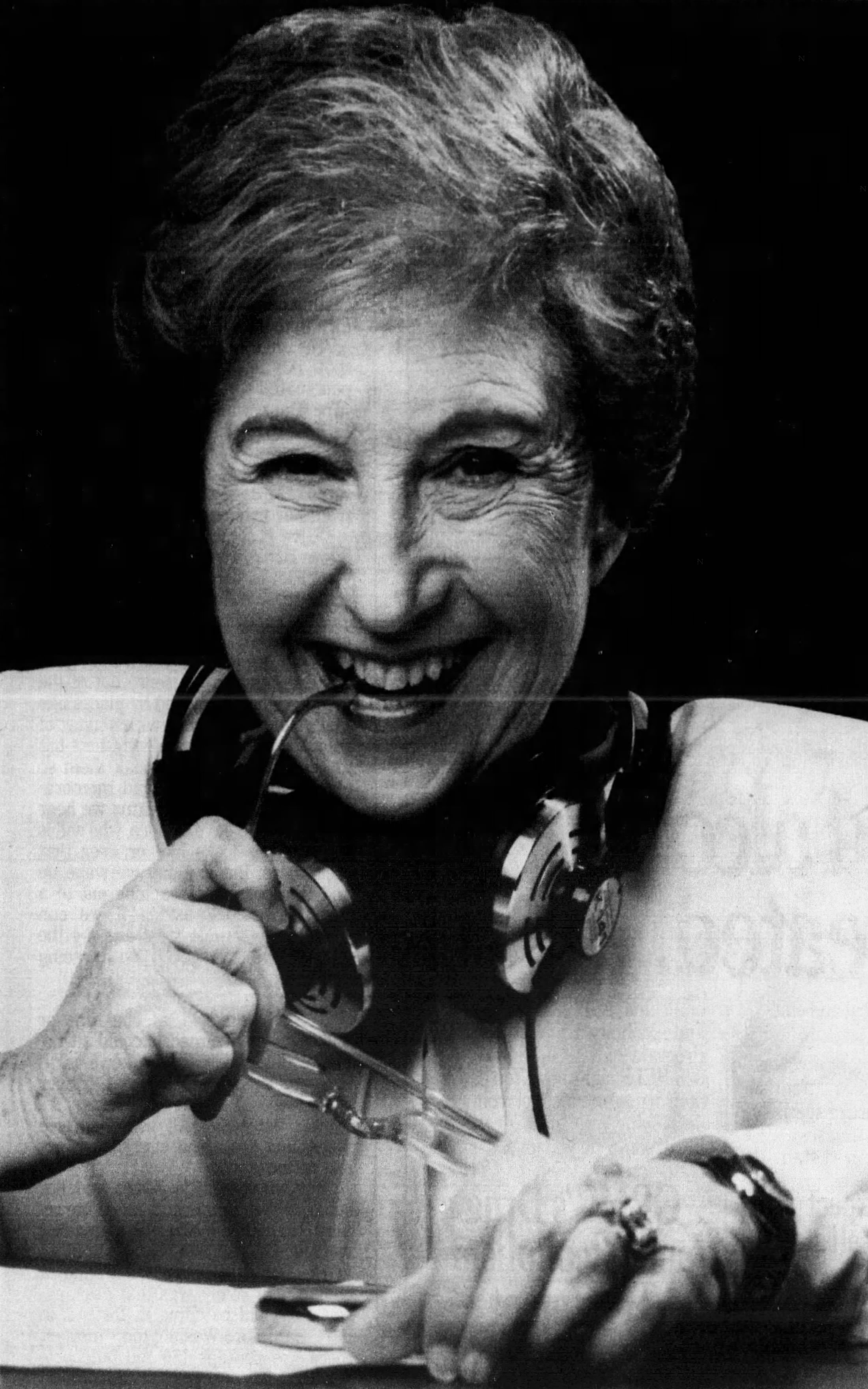
- Ayres c. 1987
- Born: Florence Aaronson; July 12, 1923; Baltimore, Maryland, U.S.
- Died: January 14, 2022 (aged 98); Baltimore, Maryland, U.S.
- Education: Western High School
- Occupation: Radio actress

Florence Aaronson (July 12, 1923 – January 14, 2022), known professionally as Flo Ayres, was an American actress and a founding member of the Washington, D.C. chapter of SAG-AFTRA.

== Early life ==
Ayres had two brothers and a sister and attended Western High School. After high school, she studied at a drama school and worked with local theater groups for three years.

== Career ==
In 1948, Ayres acted in Baltimore in a Johns Hopkins Playshop production of an English translation of Martine. In the 1950s, Ayres teamed up with Walt Teas, another nationally known voice from Baltimore, to become one of the first freelance voiceover teams in the radio industry. Over the next 30 years, Ayres, along with Teas and another personality, Joe Knight, recorded thousands of commercials and syndicated programs on a national scale, mostly at Baltimore's version of Hollywood, Flite Three Studios, and overseen by legendary audio engineer, Louis Mills.

In the 1960s and 1970s, Ayres also taught radio and communications at several Baltimore-area institutes of higher learning, such as Johns Hopkins University, Goucher College, and Towson University, and collaborated on projects with famous Vatican painter Joseph Sheppard and Beatles' photographer Morton Tadder. Ayres also had an extensive solo career spanning over 50 years. In addition to radio commercials, Ayres narrated for such institutions as the National Geographic Society, SeaWorld, and the AARP. For 25 years, Ayres hosted regular radio shows such as "Tuning into Life," "The Heart of the Matter," and she wrote and produced the radio series "For the Young at Heart". Ayres wrote, produced, and starred in a children's music CD about manners, entitled "Doo-zees and Don't-zees," which was released in May 2007.

In 1983, Ayres won an Addy Award from the American Advertising Federation and a Best in Baltimore Award from the Advertising Association of Baltimore for commercials that she made for the Baltimore Blast.

== Later life and death ==
In retirement, even into her 90s, Ayres still produced occasional spots from her home in Baltimore, and from nearby B.H. Audio studios in Pikesville, Maryland. She died at her home in Baltimore on January 14, 2022, at the age of 98, from dementia and COVID-19.
