= Richard Pringle =

American psychologist and professor

- Education: Eckerd College (B.A.); Kansas State University (M.S., Ph.D.)
- Scientific career
- Fields: Relational psychology, peace studies
- Workplaces: Goucher College

Leslie Richard Pringle is an American psychologist and professor. Pringle holds the Henry S. Dulaney Professorship of Psychology and is affiliated with the peace studies program at Goucher College. He researches the psychology of community service and relational psychology in line with relational cultural theory.

== Early life and education ==
Pringle was raised in working class family in Florida. He was a first-generation college student and had intended to study physics before shifting to psychology after taking a class with a charismatic professor. He earned a Bachelor of Arts degree in 1972 from Eckerd College, then called Florida Presbyterian College. He completed an undergraduate thesis, The Novels Of Kurt Vonnegut, Jr.: A Study Of Belief. In 1977, Pringle completed a Master's of Science degree at Kansas State University. He wrote a Master's Thesis under advisor Thaddeus M. Cowan entitled Mental Transformations Of Possible And Impossible 4-Cornered Tori. He earned a Doctor of Philosophy at Kansas State University in 1979 under the same advisor. His dissertation was entitled Perceived Number Equivalence By Adults And Children: A Normalization Model Of Size-Density Coordination. While completing his graduate degrees, Pringle subscribed to a scientific and quantitative version of psychology.

== Career ==
Pringle joined Goucher College in 1979 as an assistant professor where he taught courses using quantitative frameworks including statistics and research methods. His original view of psychology, which considered "healthiness to be rooted in autonomy" began to shift due to the introduction of feminist theory to the field in the 1970s and 80s. Regarding his new take on psychology, Pringle cites the influence of feminist critiques introduced by his students and researchers including Carol Gilligan and Jean Baker Miller. He later continued to assess his philosophy on psychology and came to agree with relational cultural theory. In 1990, he was an associate professor and chairman of the faculty. In 1996, Carol Gilligan did a residency at Goucher and Pringle discussed his thoughts on the importance of relationships in the classroom, to which Gilligan suggested he call it relational psychology. As of 2018, Pringle holds the Henry S. Dulaney Professor of Psychology and is affiliated with the peace studies program at Goucher College.

=== Research ===
Pringle researches relational psychology. He has studied the psychology of community service and mentoring since 1985. In 2015, Pringle conducted a study with psychology professor and associate dean Janet Shope on the Goucher College community's feelings towards sexual assaults.
