= Grace Manson =

American psychologist

Grace Eveyln Manson (1893–1967) was an American psychologist known for her work as an occupational psychologist.

== Early life and education ==
Manson was born on July 15, 1893, in Baltimore, Maryland. Educated at Goucher College, where she received her AB in 1915, and Columbia University, where she received her AM in 1919, she went on to earn a Ph.D. from the Carnegie Institute of Technology (now Carnegie Mellon University) in 1923.

== Career and research ==
She began her career in research at the University of Michigan, where she was a researcher from 1923 to 1926 and a research associate from 1926 to 1930. Manson then moved to Northwestern University, where she was a psychology professor and the director of personnel research. She remained there until 1944, when she became a civil servant, and worked for the Veterans Administration and Social Security Administration. Her research focused on selection techniques, differential psychology, and personnel research and included statistics on women's occupations, earnings, and vocational interests. She was a highly cited researcher in her era. She was a member of the American Psychological Association.

== Bibliography ==
- Koppes, Laura L. (2014). Historical Perspectives in Industrial and Organizational Psychology. New York, New York: Psychology Press. ISBN 978-1-317-82448-0.
- Ogilvie, Marilyn Bailey; Harvey, Joy Dorothy (2000). The Biographical Dictionary of Women in Science: L-Z. New York, New York: Taylor & Francis. ISBN 978-0-415-92040-7.
