= Robert S. Welch =

Robert Stephen Welch II

Acting President of Goucher College
- In office 2000–2001
- Preceded by: Judy Jolley Mohraz
- Succeeded by: Sanford J. Ungar

Personal details
- Born: February 1944 Middleborough, Massachusetts
- Died: February 28, 2016 (aged 71) Baltimore, Maryland
- Education: Brown University (B.A.); University of Massachusetts Amherst (Ph.D.)
- Profession: College administrator; Academic

Robert Stephen Welch II (February 1944 – February 28, 2016) was an American academic and college administrator who served as dean and later as interim president of Goucher College.

== Early life and education ==
Born in Middleborough, Massachusetts, Welch graduated from Brown University and received his Ph.D. in philosophy from the University of Massachusetts Amherst where his dissertation focused on René Descartes. He completed his dissertation titled, Doubt, certainty and the Cartesian Circle under committee chairman Fred Feldman.

== Career ==
He went on to teach at the University of Massachusetts Amherst and served as an administrator in its University Without Walls program. Later an administrator at Johns Hopkins University, he joined the faculty of Goucher College in 1989. From 2000 to 2001, Welch served as interim president of Goucher College, subsequently returning to his previous role as dean of graduate studies and lecturer in philosophy at the school.

== Later years and death ==
Welch died at the age of 71 on February 28, 2016, after suffering from cancer at his home in Baltimore, Maryland. After his death, Goucher named the Robert S. Welch Center for Graduate and Professional Studies in his honor.
