= Robert Slocum =

American botanist

- Born: Robert Dale Slocum
- Education: University of Maine BA; Ohio State University MS; University of Texas at Austin PhD
- Scientific career
- Fields: Plant physiology; Molecular biology; Biotechnology
- Workplaces: Williams College; Goucher College
- Thesis: Studies on the localization of phytochrome and calcium in light-and-gravity-stimulated plants (1981)

Robert Dale Slocum is an American biologist and botanist. He is a professor of biology in the Center for Natural Sciences at Goucher College. His research focuses on plant physiology, molecular biology, and biotechnology.

== Education ==
Slocum completed a Bachelor of Arts at University of Maine. In 1977, Slocum earned a Master of Science from Ohio State University. His master's thesis was titled Effects of SO₂ and pH on the ultrastructure of the Trebouxia phycobiont of the pollution-sensitive lichen Parmelia caperata (L.) Ach. He earned a doctorate from University of Texas at Austin in 1981. His dissertation is titled Studies on the localization of phytochrome and calcium in light-and-gravity-stimulated plants.

== Career ==
Slocum researches the physiology of plants, adaptation to environmental stresses, nitrogen metabolism, and the molecular biology and biotechnology of plants. Slocum was a professor in the Department of Botany at Williams College. In 1991, he published Biochemistry and Physiology of Polyamines in Plants. Slocum joined the faculty at Goucher College in 1992. He is a Professor of Biology in the Center for Natural Sciences at Goucher. In 2005, Slocum received a 3-year grant for $340,000 from the National Science Foundation. With the grant, Slocum and Christopher T. Brown of the National Human Genome Research Institute conducted research on the regulation of pyrimidine metabolism in plants with a team of undergraduates. From 2011 to 2012, Slocum was a rotating program director of the National Science Foundation's Division of Integrative Organismal Systems.

== Selected works ==
=== Books ===
- Biochemistry and physiology of polyamines in plants. Slocum, Robert D., Flores, Hector E. Boca Raton: CRC Press. 1991. ISBN 0849368650. OCLC 24794433.

=== Articles ===
- Slocum, Robert D.; Kaur-Sawhney, Ravindar; Galston, Arthur W. (December 1984). "The physiology and biochemistry of polyamines in plants". Archives of Biochemistry and Biophysics. 235 (2): 283–303. doi:10.1016/0003-9861(84)90201-7. ISSN 0003-9861. PMID 6393877.
- Slocum, Robert D.; Galston, Arthur (October 1985). "Changes in Polyamine Biosynthesis Associated with Postfertilization Growth and Development in Tobacco Ovary Tissues". Plant Physiology. 79 (2): 336–343. doi:10.1104/pp.79.2.336. ISSN 0032-0889. PMC 1074885. PMID 11540835.
- Slocum, Robert D. (August 2005). "Genes, enzymes and regulation of arginine biosynthesis in plants". Plant Physiology and Biochemistry. 43 (8): 729–745. doi:10.1016/j.plaphy.2005.06.007. ISSN 0981-9428. PMID 16122935.
- Slocum, Robert D.; Scholl, Jacob D. (Fall 2013). "NSF Support of Research at Primarily Undergraduate Institutions (PUIs)" (PDF). Council on Undergraduate Research Quarterly. 34 (1): 31–40. ISSN 1072-5830.
