= LaDema Langdon =

American botanist

- Born: January 3, 1893
- Died: April 1977 (aged 84)
- Education: Oberlin College, University of Chicago
- Known for: floral anatomy
- Scientific career
- Workplaces: Baltimore Junior College, Goucher College
- Patrons: National Research Council, American Philosophical Society

LaDema Mary Langdon (5 January 1893 – April 1977) was an American botanist known for her work on floral anatomy, taxonomy, embryology, and morphology of Juglandaceae, Fagaceae, Cycas, and Dioon spinulosum. She was a member of the American Association for the Advancement of Science and was a professor at Baltimore Junior College and Goucher College. She earned her bachelor's degree from Oberlin College and her graduate degrees from the University of Chicago.

Langdon's research focused on the stem anatomy of Cycas and Dioon spinulosum as well as the anatomy and taxonomy of floral species such as the family of Juglandaceae and Fagaceae. While the cycas species was previously investigated, Langdon's research was the first to investigate its growth rings. In a study, she also described the anatomy of the packing tissue of the genus Carya. Her works were funded by grants from the National Research Council and the American Philosophical Society.

== Publications ==
- The Ray System of Quercus Alba (1918)
- Anatomy of seedling buds of Quercus (1927)
- Embryogeny of Carya and Juglans, A Comparative Study (1934)
- Ontogenetic and anatomical studies of the flower and fruit of the Fagaceae and Juglandaceae (1939)
