= Rhoda Dorsey =

American historian and college president (1927-2014)

- Goucher College 1994 Commencement Ceremony

8th President of Goucher College
- In office 1974 – June 30, 1994
- Preceded by: Marvin Banks Perry Jr.
- Succeeded by: Judy Jolley Mohraz

Acting President of Goucher College
- In office 1973 – 1974

Academic Dean of Goucher College
- In office 1968 – 1973

Personal details
- Born: September 9, 1927 Dorchester, Boston, Massachusetts, U.S.
- Died: May 10, 2014 (aged 86) Cockeysville, Maryland, U.S.
- Education: Smith College (BA); University of Cambridge (BA) (MPhil); University of Minnesota (PhD)
- Profession: College administrator; Academic; Philanthropy; Historian

Rhoda M. Dorsey (September 9, 1927 – May 10, 2014) was an American historian and college president. Dorsey was the longest serving president of Goucher College and the first of only two women to hold the position.

== Early life and education ==
Rhoda Dorsey was born on September 9, 1927, in Dorchester neighborhood of Boston, Massachusetts. When Dorsey was a teenager, her mother died. She and her younger sister Frances Cobb (née Dorsey) were then cared for by Clara MacKenzie, whom her father retained full time, to care for the girls in his home in Newton, Massachusetts.

Dorsey graduated with a bachelor's degree Smith College, magna cum laude, in 1949. She then attended University of Cambridge as a Fulbright scholar where she earned a bachelor's and master's degree. In 1954, while completing her doctorate at University of Minnesota, she was hired as an assistant professor of history at Goucher College. Dorsey completed her doctorate in 1956. Her dissertation was titled The Resumption of Anglo-American Trade in New England 1783–1794.

== Career ==
Dorsey became an academic dean in 1968. In 1973, Dorsey succeeded Marvin Banks Perry, Jr. as the acting president. The next year, she was appointed as Goucher College's eighth president, becoming the institution's first woman to serve in this position. She presided over Goucher College in 1986 when its board of trustees voted to allow men to attend the college.

She retired on June 30, 1994, after serving as the President of Goucher for 21 years.

== Community involvement ==
Dorsey was a member of many corporate boards. Upon retirement, she remained a volunteer at the Hampton National Historic Site. She helped organize the 1995 book sale at her alma mater Smith College.

== Personal life ==
While serving as president of Goucher, Dorsey lived on campus in the president's residence and shared the residence with her childhood caretaker, Clara MacKenzie until Dorsey's retirement. Dorsey enjoyed traveling and was an avid gardener, specializing in flowers and herbs.

== See also ==
- List of women presidents or chancellors of co-ed colleges and universities
