= Helen Dodson Prince =

American astronomer (1905–2002)

- Born: December 31, 1905; Baltimore, Maryland
- Died: February 4, 2002 (aged 96); Arlington, Virginia
- Education: Goucher College (BA); University of Michigan (PhD)
- Known for: Solar flares
- Awards: Annie Jump Cannon Award in Astronomy (1955)
- Scientific career
- Fields: Astronomy
- Workplaces: University of Michigan
- Doctoral advisor: Heber Doust Curtis

Helen Dodson Prince (December 31, 1905 – February 4, 2002) was an American astronomer who pioneered work in solar flares at the University of Michigan.

== Early life and education ==
Helen Prince (née Dodson) was born in Baltimore, Maryland on December 31, 1905, to Helen Walter and Henry Clay Dodson. Being skilled in both physics and mathematics, Prince received a full scholarship to study mathematics at Goucher College, where she received a Bachelor of Arts degree in 1927. During her undergraduate studies, she was influenced by professor Florence Lewis to study astronomy. Prince continued onto graduate school at the University of Michigan, where she received her master's degree in 1932 and her Ph.D. in 1934, both in astronomy. Prince's doctoral thesis was entitled "A Study of the Spectrum of 25 Orionis".

== Career and achievements ==
Prince served as an assistant professor of astronomy at Wellesley College from 1933 to 1945. Prince spent the summers of 1934 and 1935, at the Maria Mitchell Observatory, where she continued to study the spectroscopy of 25 Orionis. Her findings would later be published in the Astrophysical Journal. During the summers of 1938 and 1939, Prince's interest in solar activity became prominent while researching it at the Paris Observatory. Between 1943 and 1945, Prince worked at the Massachusetts Institute of Technology's Radiation Laboratory, where she made significant contributions to the study of radar. After World War II, she returned to Goucher College, where she was an astronomy professor from 1945 to 1950. Prince began her research at the McMath–Hulbert Observatory in 1947 and eventually left MIT to become its associate director as well as to be an astronomy professor in Michigan. Upon retiring from the University of Michigan in 1976, Helen Dodson Prince continued her work until 1979 at the observatory as a professor emerita. Even then, from 1979 to the year of her death in 2002, Prince remained an independent consultant for the Applied Physics Laboratory at Johns Hopkins University. Her memberships included being a fellow of the American Astronomical Society, the American Association for the Advancement of Science, and the American Geophysical Union.

Dodson held the Dean Van Meter fellowship from Goucher in 1932 and received the Annie Jump Cannon Award in Astronomy in 1954. In 1974, Dodson received the Faculty Distinguished Achievement Award from the University of Michigan. Throughout her career, Dodson published over 130 journal articles, many co-authored by E. Ruth Hedeman, and mostly on solar flares. Among her students at Goucher were astronomers Nan Dieter-Conklin and Harriet H. Malitson.

== Awards and honors ==
- Dean Van Meter Fellowship, Goucher College (1932)
- Annie Jump Cannon Award in Astronomy (1955)
- Faculty Distinguished Achievement Award from the University of Michigan (1974)
- Asteroid 71669 Dodsonprince, discovered by astronomers with the Catalina Sky Survey in 2000, was named in her honor. The official naming citation was published by the Minor Planet Center on 8 November 2019 (M.P.C. 118220).

== Selected publications ==
=== Articles ===
- Dodson, Helen W., and E. Ruth Hedeman. "Major Hα flares in centers of activity with very small or no spots." Solar Physics 13.2 (1970): 401–419.
- Dodson, Helen W., E. Ruth Hedeman, and Marta Rovira de Miceli. 1972. NOAA. Reevaluation of solar flares, (1967). http://purl.fdlp.gov/GPO/gpo60763.
- Dodson, Helen Walter, and E. Ruth Hedeman. "Problems of differentiation of flares with respect to geophysical effects." (1964).
- Dodson, Helen W., and E. Ruth Hedeman. "The proton flare of August 28, 1966." Solar Physics 4.2 (1968): 229–239.
- Dodson, Helen W., E. Ruth Hedeman, and A. E. Covington. "Solar Flares and Associated 2800 Mc/sec (10.7 Cm) Radiation." The Astrophysical Journal 119 (1954): 541.
- Dodson, Helen W., and E. Ruth Hedeman. "Geomagnetic disturbances associated with solar flares with major premaximum bursts at radio frequencies 200 MC/S." Journal of Geophysical Research 63.1 (1958): 77–96.
- Dodson, Helen W., and E. Ruth Hedeman. "Geomagnetic disturbances associated with solar flares with major premaximum bursts at radio frequencies 200 MC/S." Journal of Geophysical Research 63.1 (1958): 77–96.
- Dodson, Helen W., E. Ruth Hedeman, and Leif Owren. "Solar Flares and Associated 200 Mc/sec Radiation." The Astrophysical Journal 118 (1953): 169.
- Dodson, Helen W., and E. Ruth Hedeman. "The Frequency and Positions of Flares Within Three Active Sunspot Areas." The Astrophysical Journal 110 (1949): 242.

=== Book ===
- An experimental comprehensive flare index and its derivation for" Major" flares, 1955-1969. Vol. 14., compiled by Helen W. Dodson and E. Ruth Hedeman; prepared by Research Laboratories, National Oceanic and Atmospheric Administration, Environmental Data Service. 1971.
