= Kaushik Bagchi =

Indian academic

Dr. Kaushik Bagchi was born in India, and is the former chair of the History and Historic Preservation department at Goucher College in Baltimore, Maryland. He was an associate professor of history at Goucher College until approximately 2007. The circumstances under which he left the position are unclear.

Dr. Bagchi received his B.A. from St. Stephen's College, Delhi and his M.A. and Ph.D. from Ohio State University.

Professor Bagchi has published on world history, Asian history, Madagascan history, colonialism, and Orientalism. He has presented conference papers on topics such as the problem of chronology in thematically-structured world history courses, world-systems theory, and Orientalism. He has also delivered several presentations on using instructional technology in the college classroom. His former courses at Goucher included World History; Gandhi; Frontiers (a freshman seminar): Third World Music and History; Comparative History of Colonialism in Asia; and China and India since Revolution and Independence. He used to lead a Goucher study-abroad program to Ghana. Professor Bagchi speaks several languages including Bengali, Hindi, German, French, and Japanese.
