= José Antonio Bowen =

American college administrator

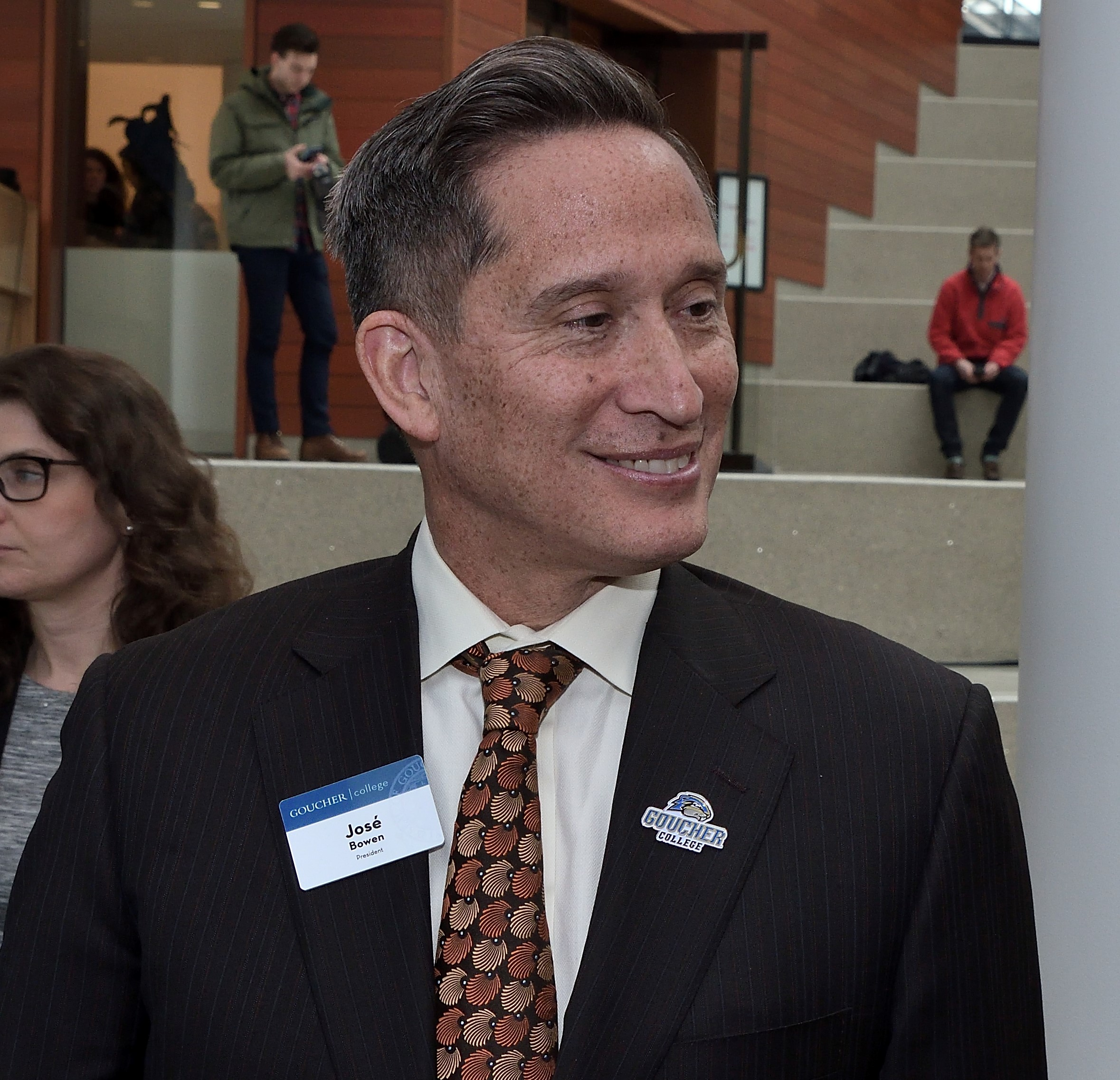
- Bowen in March 2018

11th President of Goucher College
- In office 2014 – 2019
- Preceded by: Sanford J. Ungar
- Succeeded by: Kent Devereaux

Personal details
- Born: March 11, 1962 (age 64) Woodland, California
- Education: Stanford University (B.A., M.A., PhD)
- Occupation: College administrator; Academic; Author
- Website: josebowen.com

José Antonio Bowen (born March 11, 1962) is an American author and academic. He served as the 11th president of Goucher College from 2014 to 2019.

== Early life and education ==
Bowen was born in Woodland, California, to Wayne Bowen and Celina Antonio. He lived until the age of six outside of Madrid and Barcelona. He also spent parts of his childhood in Atlanta and Italy. When Bowen was six, his family moved to Fresno, California, where he resided for the remainder of his childhood. Bowen is of Ashkenazi descent on his father's side and Afro-Cuban on his mother's. In high school, Bowen was the valedictorian of class, graduating with a 4.0 GPA. He went on to attend Stanford University and graduated with a bachelor's in chemistry and two master's in music composition and humanities. Bowen earned his joint doctorate in musicology and humanities in 1994.

== Career in academia ==
Bowen began his academic career in 1982 serving a lecturer at his alma mater, Stanford University. In 1994, Bowen was selected as the founding director of the Centre for the History and Analysis of Recorded Music at University of Southampton. He subsequently became the first endowed Caestecker Chair of Music at Georgetown University. At Georgetown, Bowen created and directed the Department of Performing Arts. From 2004 to 2006, Bowen was the Dean of Fine Arts of Miami University. In 2006, Bowen became the Dean of Meadows School of the Arts at Southern Methodist University.

Bowen was elected in 2014 by the Goucher College Board of Trustees to become the eleventh president of the college, succeeding Sanford J. Ungar. During his tenure, Bowen has undertaken initiatives to redefine the school's admissions process to encourage greater diversity, reshape the curriculum, build upon the campus's infrastructure, and renovate and expand existing facilities. In 2017, Bowen offered to forgo a salary increase and extended his contract with Goucher through June 2022. In October 2018, Bowen announced that he would break his contract and resign as president of Goucher on June 30, 2019. He was succeeded by Bryan Coker (Acting President) and then Kent Devereaux. He later told Forbes in an interview that he left due to feeling "burned out" managing a small college facing financial challenges, saying, "[f]ive years was a long time to be at the point of the spear and in crisis mode."

== Music and written works ==
Bowen is an experienced jazz pianist and has himself composed many Jewish-inspired musical pieces such as a jazz Shabbat, a fusion of jazz and klezmer influences, and Hanukkah music. Bowen has performed his jazz-style Shabbat at synagogues. He also composed a Jewish choral music work titled "Voice from the Attic" that includes text from Anne Frank's diary.

Bowen served on the executive committee and as a track note writer for Jazz: The Smithsonian Anthology. He was also a founding board member of the National Recording Preservation Board for the Library of Congress. Bowen has written more than 100 scholarly articles and edited the 2003 Cambridge Companion to Conducting. His book "Teaching Naked: How Moving Technology Out of Your College Classroom Will Improve Student Learning" was published in 2012, and earned him the 2014 Frederic W. Ness Book Award. In 2017, he co-authored the companion book "Teaching Naked Techniques: A Practical Guide to Designing Better Classes."

== Honors and awards ==
Bowen was awarded a National Endowment for the Humanities fellowship and was a Fellow of the Royal Society of Arts. In 2010, he was honored by Stanford University as a Distinguished Alumni Scholar. Bowen was awarded the 8th annual Ernest L. Boyer Award in 2018 by the New American Colleges and Universities.

== Personal life ==
Bowen and his wife, Kimberly, have one child, a daughter named Naomi.

Academic offices
Preceded by Sanford J. Ungar	President of Goucher College; 2014–2019	Succeeded by Bryan Coker
Preceded by Carole Brandt	Dean of Southern Methodist University Meadows School of the Arts; 2006–2014	Succeeded by Samuel S. Holland
