= Victor Ricciardi =

American professor of business and author

- Born: c. 1969 (age 56–57)
- Education: Hofstra University; St. John's University; Golden Gate University; Kansas State University
- Occupations: Professor, author

Victor Ricciardi is an American professor of business and author. He was an assistant professor of financial management at Goucher College. He is currently teaching at Ursinus College as a visiting assistant professor of finance.

== Life ==
Victor Ricciardi completed a Bachelor of Business Administration in accounting and management from Hofstra University in 1991. He earned a Master of Business Administration in finance in 1995 from St. John's University. Ricciardi obtained an Advanced Professional Certificate in economics at St. John's University in 1996. He was a doctoral candidate in finance at Golden Gate University. In 2012 he received a graduate certificate from the school of Family Studies and Human Services, Personal Family Financial Planning in Kansas State University. He also added an additional graduate certificate in Financial Therapy from the same university in 2018.

Ricciardi's dissertation research was on decision-making process by finance professors and financial planners in assessing risk with stock investments.

Ricciardi worked as an investment fund accountant for Dreyfus Corporation and the Alliance Capital Management. From 2005 to 2008, he was an assistant professor of finance at Kentucky State University. Ricciardi was the editor of electronic journals distributed by the Social Science Research Network. He was an assistant professor of financial management at Goucher College from 2010 to 2019.

== Selected works ==
Some of his notable works based on the number of citations from Google Scholar are:

- Ricciardi, V.; Simon, H. (2000). "What is Behavioral Finance?". Business, Education & Technology Journal. 2 (2): 1–9. SSRN 256754.
- Riccardi, V. (July 20, 2004). A Risk Perception Primer: A Narrative Research Review of the Risk Perception Literature in Behavioral Accounting and Behavioral Finance. Social Science Research Network (PhD). doi:10.2139/ssrn.566802. SSRN 566802.
- Riccardi, V. (September 2006). "A research starting point for the new scholar: A unique perspective of behavioral finance". ICFAI Journal of Behavioral Finance. 3 (3): 6–23. SSRN 928251.
- Riccardi, V. (2008). "The Psychology of Risk: The Behavioral Finance Perspective". In Fabozzi, Frank J. (ed.). Handbook of Finance: Investment Management and Financial Management. Vol. 2. John Wiley & Sons. pp. 85–111. SSRN 1155822.
- Baker, H.; Riccardi, V. (February 2014). "How biases affect investor behaviour". The European Financial Review: 7–10. SSRN 2457425.
- Baker, H. Kent; Ricciardi, Victor, eds. (2014). Investor Behavior: The Psychology of Financial Planning and Investing. John Wiley & Sons. ISBN 9781118492987.
- Baker, K.; Riccardi, V. (March 1, 2015). "Understanding behavioral aspects of financial planning and investing". Journal of Financial Planning. 28 (3): 22–26. SSRN 2596202.
- Baker, H. Kent; Filbeck, Greg; Ricciardi, Victor, eds. (2017). Financial Behavior: Players, Services, Products, and Markets. Oxford University Press. ISBN 9780190270018.
