= Selma L. Oppenheimer =

Visual Artist

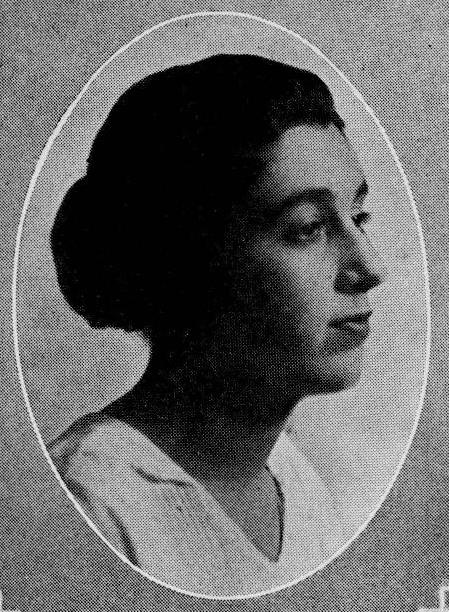
- Born: 1898; Baltimore
- Died: Baltimore
- Occupation: Artist

Selma Levy Oppenheimer (1898 - 3 October 1988) was an artist from Baltimore.

== Education and career ==
Oppenheimer graduated from Goucher College in 1919 and matriculated at the Maryland Institute College of Art or MICA, where she studied portraiture and costume design. Oppenheimer exhibited widely in the state, as well as nationally and abroad. She was a founding member and president of the Maryland chapter of the Artists' Equity Association. She also served on the board of trustees of the Baltimore Museum of Art from 1961 to 1972.

== Work ==
Oppenheimer worked in a range of media, including drawing, watercolor, oil painting, and sculpture. Her work is preserved in collections throughout the state, including Johns Hopkins University. A charcoal study of a woman is housed at the University of Maryland Art Gallery, and her portrait of her husband, the Hon. Reuben Oppenheimer, hangs in the Clarence Mitchell courtroom of Baltimore Circuit Court.
