= Eugene Allen Noble =

American academic administrator and minister (1865–1948)

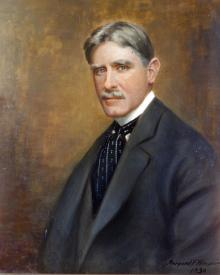
- A painted portrait of Noble

16th President of Dickinson College
- In office 1911–1914
- Preceded by: George Edward Reed
- Succeeded by: James Henry Morgan

3rd President of Goucher College
- In office 1911–1908
- Preceded by: John Goucher
- Succeeded by: John Blackford Van Meter

President of Centenary University
- In office 1902–1908

Personal details
- Born: March 5, 1865 Brooklyn, New York
- Died: June 28, 1948 (age 83) New York, New York
- Education: Trinity School; Wesleyan University (Ph.B); Garrett Biblical Institute
- Profession: College administrator; Academic; Pastor

Eugene Allen Noble (March 5, 1865 – June 28, 1948) was an American academic and Methodist minister. He served as president of three institutions: Centenary University from 1902 to 1908, Goucher College from 1908 to 1911, and Dickinson College from 1911 to 1914. He was also an administrator at the Juilliard School.

== Early life and education ==
Noble was born on March 5, 1865, in Brooklyn, New York, to William Richard Noble, a reverend, and Margaret J. Hays. He attended the Trinity School in New York City and Wesleyan University, from which he graduated with a Bachelor of Philosophy in 1891. After college, he studied at the Garrett Biblical Institute in Evanston, Illinois. Noble married his first wife, Lillian White Osborn, in 1892. Noble was a member of the Phi Beta Kappa honor society and Alpha Delta Phi.

== Career ==
=== Methodist ministry ===
After finishing his education, Noble was ordained as a minister and joined the New York Eastern Conference of the Methodist Church. Noble served with two churches, one in Connecticut from 1891 to 1895 and another in Brooklyn from 1895 to 1897. He was also briefly an assistant superintendent at Brooklyn Methodist Hospital in New York.

=== Academia ===
In 1902, Noble was appointed as president of Centenary University in Hackettstown, New Jersey, then known as the Centenary Collegiate Institute. Noble held this position for six years.

In 1908, Noble was selected to head Goucher College, then the Women's College of Baltimore. Noble's predecessor, clergyman John Goucher, was at sea returning from a trip to Egypt and Palestine at the time of his inauguration. In Goucher's place, the college's board tasked Bishop William Fraser McDowell with installing Noble as president.

Noble's tenure was relatively short; after just three years, he tendered his resignation, to the disappointment of the school's board, after accepting an offer to serve as president of Dickinson College. At the time of Noble's departure, the college was left in debt and with no endowment, though its financial situation would improve under the administration of his successor. The most notable action taken under Noble's administration was the renaming of the college in honor of John Goucher, who was the school's most prominent co-founder and benefactor and had served as its president for 18 years.

In 1911, Noble became Dickinson College's 16th president. Just three years later, he was asked by Dickinson's board of trustees to resign due to declining enrollment and inadequate fundraising. After leaving his post at Dickinson, Noble returned to New York City where he briefly served as executive secretary at the Juilliard School.

== Later years and death ==
Noble died at his home in New York on June 28, 1948, at the age of 83. He was survived by his second wife, Therese K. Lownes; his first wife's death had preceded his by 18 years.

== Selected works ==
- Noble, Eugene Allen (February 2, 1893). "The Need of Church". Christian Advocate. p. 69. ProQuest 125852037.
- Noble, Eugene Allen (October 27, 1904). "The Boy in School". Christian Advocate. p. 1740. ProQuest 125971738.

== Honorary degrees ==
- Wesleyan University (Doctor of Sacred Theology)
- Dickinson College (Doctor of Divinity)
- Hamilton College (Doctor of Law)
- University of Pittsburgh (Doctor of Law)
