= Judy Jolley Mohraz =

American women's studies historian

1st President and Chief Executive Officer of Virginia G. Piper Charitable Trust
- In office 2000 – June 2014
- Preceded by: Position established
- Succeeded by: Susan Pepin

9th President of Goucher College
- In office July 1, 1994 – June 15, 2000
- Preceded by: Rhoda Dorsey
- Succeeded by: Robert S. Welch (Acting)

Associate Provost for Student Academic Affairs of Southern Methodist University
- In office 1988 – 1994

Assistant Provost at Southern Methodist University
- In office 1983 – 1988

Personal details
- Born: Judy Mae Jolley Rosenbaum; 1943 or 1944 (age 82–83) Houston, Texas, U.S.
- Spouse: Bijan Mohraz (m. 1973)
- Children: 2
- Education: Baylor University (B.A., M.A.); University of Illinois at Urbana–Champaign (Ph.D.)
- Profession: College administrator; Academic; Chief executive officer; Historian

Judy Jolley Mohraz (born 1943) is an American women's studies historian. She is a former president of Goucher College and the inaugural chief executive officer and president of the Virginia G. Piper Charitable Trust. Mohraz is the second woman to serve as Goucher's president and the college's ninth president. Mohraz was appointed by President Bill Clinton to the United States Naval Academy Board of Visitors in 1996. She is a former long-time professor and associate provost of Southern Methodist University. Mohraz is the author of The Separate Problem, a collection of case studies of Black education in the Northern United States from 1900 to 1930.

== Early life and education ==
Mohraz was born Judy Mae Jolley Rosenbaum in Houston and raised in Waco, Texas in "an education-oriented family." She is the daughter of Mae Jolley (née Jackson) who was an English teacher and graduate of Baylor University. Her grandmother and two of her aunts were also teachers. Mohraz cites not making the junior high cheerleading squad as a pivotal event in her life that influenced her to pursue college.

Mohraz attended Baylor University where, in addition to her mother, her paternal grandmother and aunt also graduated. Mohraz's paternal grandmother, an influential person in Mohraz's life, was widowed at a young age with two children when she moved from Lockhart, Texas to Waco to attend Baylor. Mohraz intended to pursue law school before deciding to major in history after taking a summer course American intellectual history at Harvard College. She graduated with a bachelor's degree in 1966 and a master's degree in 1968 from Baylor. Her Master's thesis was entitled "The Waco and Northwestern Railroad". Mohraz completed her doctorate in American history from University of Illinois at Urbana–Champaign in 1974. Her academic studies were focused on the history of women in the United States "from the late 19th to the early 20th century." Her dissertation was entitled Black Education In Three Northern Cities In The Early Twentieth Century. Mohraz was first introduced to the history of education by her professor, David Tyack. Her doctoral advisor was Winton Solberg.

== Career ==
From 1972 to 1974, Mohraz was a history lecturer at Illinois Wesleyan University. In 1974, after completing her doctorate degree, Mohraz began her twenty-year tenure at Southern Methodist University as an assistant professor in the department of history. She served as an assistant professor from 1974 to 1980. She was the coordinator of the Women's Studies Program from 1977 to 1981. In 1979, Mohraz published The Separate Problem, a collection of case studies of Black education in the Northern United States from 1900 to 1930. She served as an associate professor of history from 1980 to 1994. In 1983, she became an assistant provost before being promoted to the associate provost for student academic affairs in 1988. She taught courses for all but her last four years as associate provost.

On July 1, 1994, Mohraz succeeded Rhoda Dorsey to become the ninth president of Goucher College. She is the second woman to serve as the college's president. On June 15, 2000, announced her resignation as president of Goucher College. The same year, she was appointed inaugural chief executive officer and president of the Virginia G. Piper Charitable Trust in Scottsdale, Arizona, the nonprofit left by Piper, the widow of Motorola co-founder, Paul Galvin and vice-president Kenneth M. Piper. She resigned as president and CEO in June 2014.

In 1996, Mohraz was appointed by President Bill Clinton to the United States Naval Academy Board of Visitors. The next year, she co-chaired the Special Committee investigating allegations of unethical and criminal incidents at the United States Naval Academy to which, former Central Intelligence Agency director and committee co-chair Stansfield Turner commended Mohraz, stating that "she brought energy and a willingness to contribute her time and herself."

== Community involvement ==
Mohraz has been involved community boards including the Council on Foundations, Morrison Institute for Public Policy, the National Association of Independent Colleges and Universities and Greater Phoenix Leadership. She is the chair of the board of directors of Encore.org. Mohraz was appointed to the board of trustees of the Virginia G. Piper Charitable trust in April 2012. She has also been a trustee for other organizations including the St. Mark's School of Texas, ChildCareGroup Dallas, and the Baltimore Community Foundation.

== Personal life ==
Judy Jolley Mohraz married Bijan Mohraz, an Iranian mechanical and civil engineer, in 1973. He was a tenured professor at Southern Methodist University when she moved to Towson, Maryland to serve as the president of Goucher College and would consequently visit Maryland on the weekends. From 1994 to 1998, Bijan Mohraz was a visiting fellow at the National Institute of Standards and Technology in Gaithersburg, Maryland. Together, they have two sons, Andrew and Jonathan.

== Awards ==
Mohraz was presented a Baylor University Distinguished Alumni award in 1994. In May 2014, Mohraz was recognized by Valle del Sol as a Mom of the Year honoree. On December 12, 2014, she was awarded an honorary doctoral degree from Northern Arizona University for her commitment to the community and education.

== Selected works ==
=== Books ===
- Mohraz, Judy Jolley (1979). The Separate Problem: Case Studies of Black Education in the North, 1900-1930. Greenwood press. ISBN 9780313204111.

=== Articles ===
- Mohraz, Judy Jolley (Winter 1982). "The Equity Club: Community Building among Professional Women". The Journal of American Culture. 5 (4): 34–39. doi:10.1111/j.1542-734X.1982.0504_34.x.
- Mohraz, Judy Jolley October 25, 1996 (October 25, 1996). "Collegetown, U.S.A." The Baltimore Sun.
- Mohraz, Judy Jolley; Weinberg, Carol; Higgins, Leigh Curtis (1999). "The Goucher College-Choice Middle Schools Program Partnership". Serving Children and Families Through Community-University Partnerships: Success Stories. Outreach Scholarship. Vol. 2. Boston, MA: Springer. pp. 149–154. doi:10.1007/978-1-4615-5053-2_21. ISBN 978-1-4615-5053-2.
- Mohraz, Judy Jolley (January 16, 2000). "Missing Men on Campus". The Washington Post.
- Mohraz, Judy Jolley (March 30, 2010). "Ariz. can't afford to lose ground in early learning for kids". The Arizona Republic.
- Mohraz, Judy Jolley; Hannah, Nora (November 10, 2013). "Valley's Baby Boomers are 24-carat gold to non-profits". The Arizona Republic.

== See also ==
- List of women presidents or chancellors of co-ed colleges and universities
