= John B. Van Meter =

American cleric and college administrator

The Reverend John Blackford Van Meter
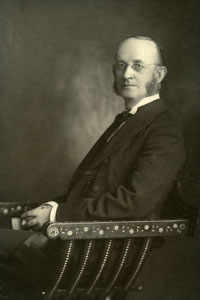

Acting President of Goucher College
- In office 1911–1913
- Preceded by: Eugene Allen Noble
- Succeeded by: William Westley Guth

Dean of Women's College of Baltimore
- In office 1885–1914

Personal details
- Born: September 6, 1842 Philadelphia, Pennsylvania, U.S.
- Died: April 8, 1930 (aged 87) Baltimore, Maryland, U.S.
- Resting place: Green Mount Cemetery
- Profession: College administrator; Academic; Pastor

John Blackford Van Meter (September 6, 1842 – April 8, 1930) was an American Methodist minister, educator, and the co-founder of Goucher College. Van Meter also served as the college's first dean and as acting president from 1911 to 1913.

== Early life and education ==
Van Meter was born on September 6, 1842, in Philadelphia, Pennsylvania, to Thomas Hurley Van Meter and Johnetta Blackford. He was of English and French descent, and his grandmother was a Quaker. He graduated from Male Central High School in Baltimore, which later became Baltimore City College. Van Meter did not pursue a college degree, which he said was due to his lack of financial means.

== Career ==
=== Methodist ministry and Navy ===
After graduating from high school, Van Meter worked as a teacher and later as a principal at several local schools. After briefly considering a career in law, he chose instead to pursue the Methodist ministry. In the 1860s, he served as a minister and preacher at several churches in Maryland and Pennsylvania. In December 1866, Van Meter married Lucinda Cassell of Westminster, Maryland. In December 1871, Van Meter was commissioned into the United States Navy as a chaplain and confirmed by the Senate in January 1872. He resigned from the Navy in April 1882.

=== Founding of the Women's College of Baltimore City ===
Through his involvement with the Methodist church in the Baltimore area, he became acquainted with fellow minister John Franklin Goucher, who would advocate for Van Meter's appointment to the annual Baltimore Methodist Conference. In the early 1880s, the Baltimore Conference was considering the establishment of a women's college, deliberations in which Van Meter and Goucher became heavily involved.

The women of the conference formed an association through which they pushed for such an institution, and Van Meter supported their efforts, at one point exclaiming that "the Conference [should] make the foundation and endowment of a female college the single object of its organized effort." Goucher and his wife, Mary Fisher Goucher, offered to help endow the institution, and in 1885, the Women's College of Baltimore City, now Goucher College, was chartered.

=== Dean and acting president of Goucher ===
In 1910, the Women’s College of Baltimore was renamed Goucher College in honor of co-founder John Goucher. In 1911, Goucher’s third president, Eugene Allan Noble, stepped down. Van Meter, then serving as dean, was asked by the board of trustees to serve as acting president while they searched for a permanent replacement. He held the position from 1911 to 1913, a period during which financial difficulties—including persistent annual deficits and growing debt—threatened the college’s survival. With support from nearby educational institutions, as well as from the college’s associates and alumni, Goucher completed a $1-million fundraising campaign, which proved sufficient to sustain the school. Van Meter reassumed his position as dean when the administration named William Westley Guth as the college's fourth president. Van Meter also remained on the faculty as a professor of English and biblical studies. Van Meter stepped down from his position as dean at Goucher in 1914, and in 1920 he was awarded an honorary doctorate by the school.

== Later years ==
Van Meter lived out his final years in Baltimore, Maryland. He died in 1930 and was buried in Green Mount Cemetery.

Academic offices
Preceded by Eugene Allen Noble	President of Goucher College; 1911–1913	Succeeded by William Westley Guth
Preceded by Position established	Dean of Women's College of Baltimore; 1885–1914	Succeeded by
