= David Allan Robertson =

American academic (1880–1961)

5th President of Goucher College
- In office 1930–1948
- Preceded by: William Westley Guth
- Succeeded by: Otto Frederick Kraushaar

Personal details
- Born: David Allan Robertson; October 17, 1880 Chicago, Illinois, U.S.
- Died: July 15, 1961 (aged 80) Baltimore, Maryland, U.S.
- Education: University of Chicago
- Profession: College administrator; Academic

David Allan Robertson (October 17, 1880 – July 15, 1961) was an American academic who served as the 5th president of Goucher College. He was also a professor at the University of Chicago in English and drama.

== Early life ==
Robertson was born on October 17, 1880, to John Robertson and Christina Mitchell, both immigrants from Scotland. He was a member of the prominent Dawson family, which was associated with McGill University. After high school, he entered the University of Chicago, graduating with Phi Beta Kappa honors in 1902.

== Academic career ==
During his graduate studies at the University of Chicago, Robertson served as an instructor in English. He eventually became a full professor in English and drama and also served in various roles in the university's administration. From 1918 to 1923, he was an administrator with the Association of American Universities, and from 1924 to 1930, Robertson was an assistant director with the American Council on Education. In 1930, Robertson was inaugurated as the 6th president of Goucher College. He served in this position for 18 years, stepping down in 1948.

== Later years and death ==
Robertson died on July 15, 1961, at the age of 80, at his home in Baltimore, Maryland.
