= William Westley Guth =

American lawyer

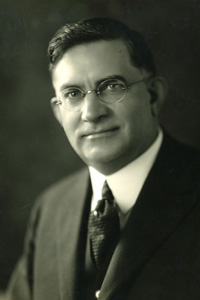

4th President of Goucher College
- In office 1913–1929
- Preceded by: John Blackford Van Meter
- Succeeded by: David Allan Robertson

President of University of the Pacific
- In office 1908–1913

Personal details
- Born: October 15, 1871 Cincinnati, Ohio
- Died: April 19, 1929 (age 57) Baltimore, Maryland
- Resting place: Guth Memorial Gate, Goucher College, Towson, Maryland
- Education: University of the Pacific; Stanford University (BA); University of California, Hastings College of the Law; Boston University (STB); Halle University (PhD)
- Profession: College administrator; Academic; Pastor; Lawyer

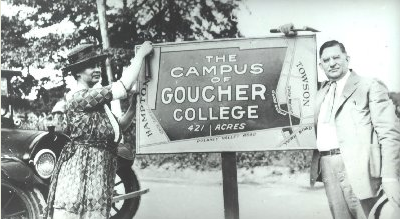
Guth with his wife, Helen, at Goucher's Towson campus in 1921

William Westley Guth (October 15, 1871 – April 19, 1929) was an American attorney, Methodist minister, and academic who served as the fourth president of Goucher College.

== Early life, family, and education ==
Guth was born on October 15, 1871, in Nashville, Tennessee, to Rev. George Guth and Susan Sophie Grandlienard of Perrefitte, Switzerland. Guth was of German, French, and Swiss descent. When he was a teenager, his family moved to San Francisco, California. He enrolled at the University of the Pacific and continued his studies at the then-newly established Stanford University, from which he graduated Phi Beta Kappa in 1892.

Following his college graduation, he studied at University of California, Hastings College of the Law and was admitted to the California bar in December 1895. He practiced law in California for several years and then continued his studies at Boston University, earning a Bachelor of Sacred Theology and becoming ordained as a Methodist minister. He briefly served as a pastor before entering academia. Guth married Helen Louise Fischbeck of San Francisco in March 1896. In 1904, he received a doctorate from Halle University in Halle, Germany. Guth's dissertation was titled Die ältere Schicht in den Erzählung über Saul und David.

== Career in academia ==
=== University of the Pacific ===
In 1908, Guth was appointed to serve as president of the University of the Pacific, which he advocated renaming to College of the Pacific. He stayed in this position for five years and published four written works.

=== Goucher College ===
In 1913, Guth was selected to serve as president of Goucher College and subsequently took residence at the college's campus in Baltimore. During his tenure, Guth orchestrated the construction of several new residence halls, including the Alumnae Lodge, and a successful million-dollar fundraising campaign, which enabled the college to reduce its debts, augment its endowment, and purchase the plot of land that would eventually become its Towson campus.

As Goucher's president, Guth voiced strong public support for women's education in the United States, telling the New York Times in December 1920, shortly after the ratification of the 19th amendment granting women's suffrage, "In the co-educational institution, everything is done from the viewpoint of men, and women receive the sort of education that men, who are more enthusiastic about the education of the male sex than they are about higher opportunities for women, can give her."

In the course of his administration, Guth at one point corresponded with U.S. President Woodrow Wilson, whose daughter Jessie had graduated from Goucher. Wilson wrote Guth in 1918 to express concern over the dismissal of faculty member Hans Froelicher, saying, "I have known so much of Doctor Froelicher through my daughters, and have formed so favorable an impression of him by direct contact with him, that I am sure that if any such impression on the part of the Trustees exists, it must be based upon some cruel misunderstanding. I beg that you will believe I am prompted to write this letter only by genuine regard for a man whom I very much esteem and without the least desire to thrust my counsel, uninvited, into the deliberations of the authorities of the college."

By 1920, Guth had grown increasingly concerned about the continued viability of the college's Baltimore campus and had begun, with the consent of Goucher's board of trustees, searching for a suitable location in the nearby suburbs. He settled on a 421-acre plot of land in Towson that had belonged to the estate of a wealthy Baltimore family. In 1921, under Guth's direction, the college purchased the land for approximately $150,000. The move was not completed until 1953, having been delayed by financial difficulties at the college during World War II and the Great Depression.

== Later years ==
=== Declining health and death ===
In the final years of his presidency at Goucher, Guth suffered significant health problems, though he remained in the position until his death in 1929 at the age of 57. Faculty member Hans Froelicher, whom Guth had previously dismissed, was appointed in his place as acting president as the college searched for a successor.

=== Interment ===
Guth was initially buried at Druid Ridge Cemetery in Pikesville, Maryland. When his wife Helen died in 1959, Goucher fulfilled her request that her and her late-husband's remains be cremated and interred at the Guth Memorial Gate at the entrance to Goucher's campus in Towson, which was completed in 1953, 24 years after his death. The gate itself was built years earlier with a donation from Guth's wife.

== Selected written works ==
- The Assurance of Faith (1911)
- Revelation and its Record (1912)
- Spiritual Values (1912)
- The Teacher's Teacher (1913)
