= Kent Devereaux =

Ministries Governance Administrator

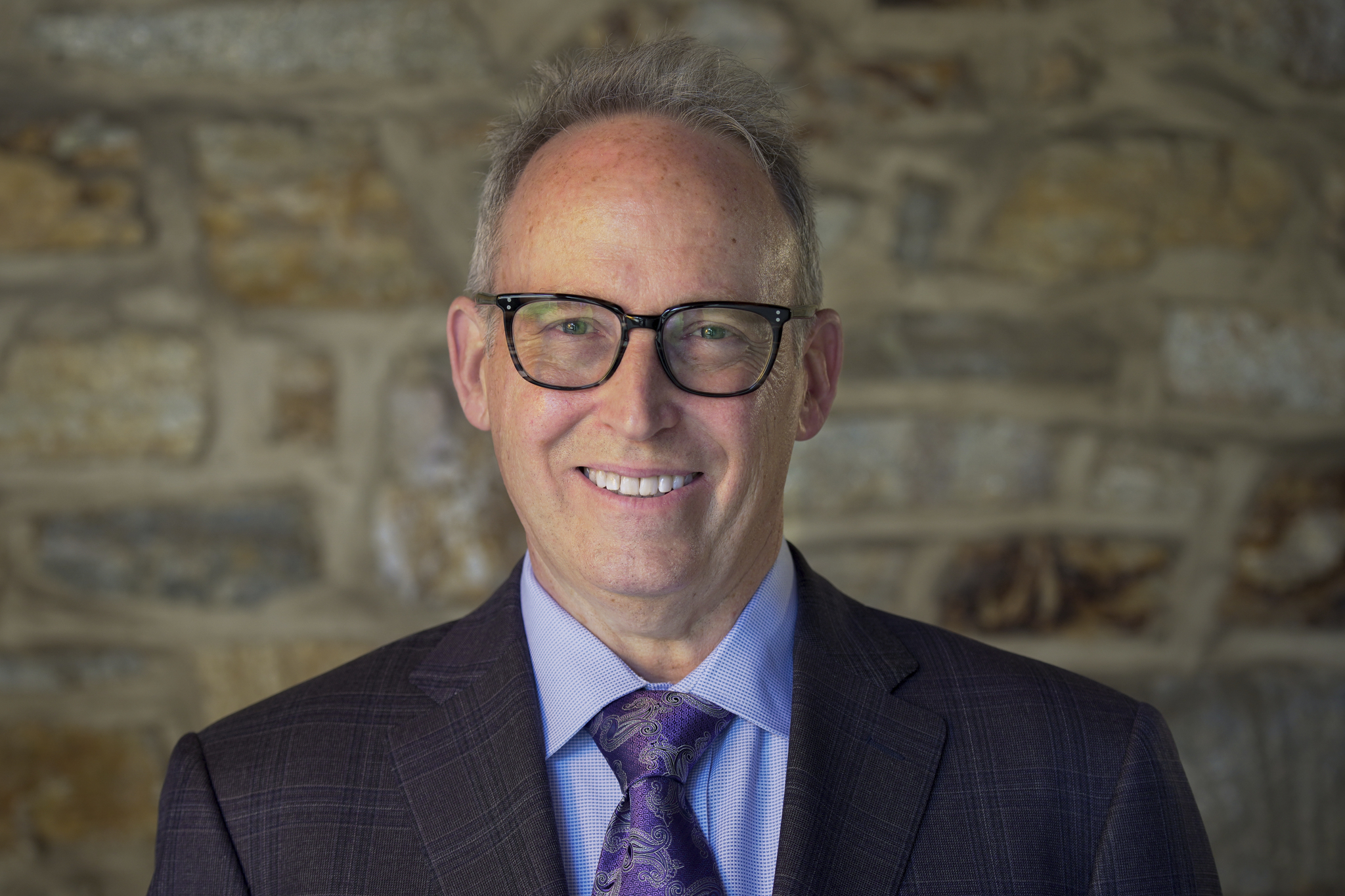
- Devereaux in 2021

12th President of Goucher College
- Incumbent
- Assumed office July 1, 2019
- Preceded by: José Antonio Bowen

President of the New Hampshire Institute of Art
- In office 2015 – 2019
- Preceded by: Roger Williams
- Succeeded by: Merged with New England College

Personal details
- Children: 1
- Education: Cornish College of the Arts (BFA); School of the Art Institute of Chicago (MFA)
- Occupation: Academic administrator, composer, director
- Website: Website

Kent Devereaux is an American composer, director, academic administrator, and the 12th and current president of Goucher College. He was previously the president of the New Hampshire Institute of Art (NHIA) from 2015 to 2019.

== Education ==
Devereaux attended the University of California, Santa Cruz and Cornish College of the Arts in Seattle, where he graduated magna cum laude with a BFA in music composition in 1982. His teachers included Lou Harrison, Anthony Braxton, and Gil Evans. He briefly studied computer science at Stanford University and earned an MFA in Art from the School of the Art Institute of Chicago in 1985, where he was an Andrew W. Mellon Fellow.

== Career ==
=== Academia ===
From 1985 to 1993, Devereaux served on the faculty of the School of the Art Institute of Chicago with a one-year appointment at the California Institute of the Arts. Additional academic appointments include serving as Senior Vice President and Dean of Curriculum at Kaplan University from 2001 to 2008.

He also served as professor and chair of the music department at Cornish College of the Arts from 2008 to 2014, where he curated the college's presenting series, Cornish Presents, and co-founded and directed the Seattle Jazz Experience youth jazz festival.

Devereaux joined the New Hampshire Institute of Art (NHIA) as president in 2015. Devereaux's initiatives at NHIA included co-founding the Manchester Cultural District Coalition, which advocated for the city to establish an official cultural district, the launching of a new Certificate in Creative Placemaking program, and the formation of an academic partnership with the University of New Hampshire at Manchester.

Outside of higher education, Devereaux served as Senior Vice President and Product Development at Encyclopædia Britannica, helping the publisher transform from a print to online business.

==== President of Goucher College (2019-) ====
On July 1, 2019, Devereaux was named as President of Goucher College.

At Goucher College, Devereaux has overseen several initiatives and changes, including the institution’s response to the COVID-19 pandemic. He led the development of a strategic plan for the college, called “Cultivating Global Changemakers,” which focuses on student success, global education, and inclusivity. He also led the creation of a campus master plan for the development of the campus, with a focus on sustainability and accessibility. It is the college’s first campus master plan in almost 30 years.

Since Devereaux has become president, Goucher College has joined the Liberal Arts College Racial Equity Leadership Alliance as a founding member, and the college has launched the Hallowed Ground Project to study the history of slavery on the campus.

=== Music ===
As a composer and director, Devereaux's work includes collaborations with artists from around the world and performances at Chicago's Steppenwolf Theatre and the Walker Arts Center. He has been a recipient of grants from the National Endowment for the Arts the National Endowment for the Humanities, and the Rockefeller Foundation, among others.

== Personal life ==
Devereaux is married to documentary film editor Jan Sutcliffe, whom he met in Chicago shortly after finishing graduate school.
