= Nan Dieter-Conklin =

American radio astronomer

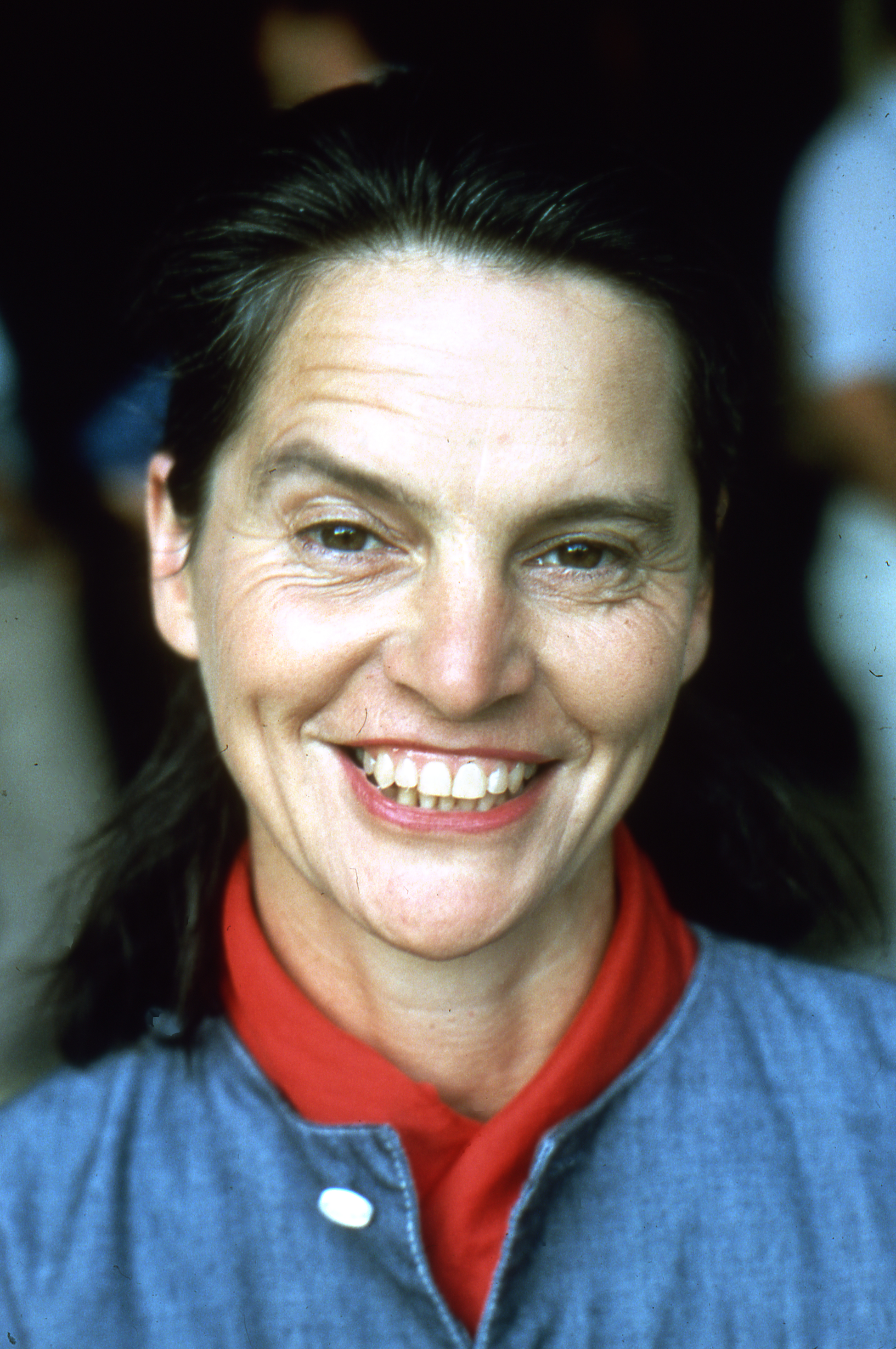
- Dieter-Conklin in 1975
- Born: Nannielou Reier; 1926; Springfield, Illinois
- Died: November 16, 2014 (aged 88); Seattle
- Other names: Nannielou Reier Hepburn Dieter Conklin, Nannielou H. Dieter
- Education: Goucher College (B.A.); Radcliffe College (Ph.D.)
- Children: 2
- Scientific career
- Fields: Radio astronomy
- Workplaces: U.S. National Geodetic Survey; Naval Research Laboratory; Air Force Research Laboratory; Radio Astronomy Laboratory

Nan Dieter-Conklin (1926 – November 16, 2014), also known as Nannielou Reier Hepburn Dieter Conklin, was an American radio astronomer.

== Early life ==
Nannielou Reier was born in Springfield, Illinois, the daughter of Paul G. Reier. She attended Goucher College to study mathematics, but an astronomy course taught by Helen Dodson sparked her interest in that subject. Dieter spent summer internships at the Maria Mitchell Observatory, working under Margaret Harwood. She completed doctoral studies at Radcliffe College in 1958, using her own radio astronomy data in her dissertation on Galaxy M33. Her research involved the radio telescope at Harvard, and she took a Harvard course on variable stars from Cecilia Payne-Gaposchkin. Astronomers Frank Drake and May Kaftan-Kassim were in Dieter's astronomy cohort at Harvard.

== Career ==
After college Nan Dieter worked for the United States Coast and Geodetic Survey. She was hired by the United States Naval Research Laboratory when it acquired a radio telescope. She published radio astronomy research on solar flares beginning in 1952, and is credited as "the first US woman radio astronomer" based on that work (Ruby Payne-Scott, an Australian, is recognized as the first woman radio astronomer). During her graduate work in Massachusetts, she was on the staff of the Air Force Cambridge Research Laboratories at Hanscom Field. In 1965, having completed her doctorate, she joined the staff of the Radio Astronomy Laboratory at the University of California, Berkeley.

Dieter-Conklin retired from Berkeley for health reasons in 1977, but continued to research and publish as she was able. Her last scholarly articles, all concerning the composition of interstellar clouds, were published in 2009, 2010, and 2014. She also published a memoir, Two Paths to Heaven's Gate, in 2006.

She was interviewed and photographed along with Vera Rubin and Paris Pişmiş as women astronomers attending the American Astronomical Society conference in Arizona in 1963. In 1964 she won the first Patricia Kayes Glass Award, at the Air Force Science and Engineering Symposium held at Brooks Air Force Base in Texas. She gave an oral history interview at Berkeley in 1977, looking back on her education and career.

== Personal life ==
Conklin's professional accomplishments stand out even more given her challenging personal circumstances. Stemming from an unstable family background, she found solace and security in the predictability of the physical sciences amidst the complexities of human relationships. In an era where women constituted only 3% of physicists and astronomers, facing both overt and covert discrimination, Conklin drew inspiration and resilience from role models like Helen Dodson and Cecilia Payne-Gaposchkin.

Nan Dieter-Conklin was married to W. Peters Hepburn Jr. from 1950 to 1953, then to fellow scientist Carlisle L. Dieter. She had two daughters, born in 1951 (Amy Hepburn) and 1958 (Aleemna K. Wraye). However, she and Dieter did not last. Conklin was diagnosed with multiple sclerosis around 1960, and married her third husband, Garret Conklin in 1968. Recognizing the challenges her health posed for her research, she retired early from Berkeley in 1977. She was widowed in 2002, and she died in Seattle in 2014, aged 88 years.
