= Erica L. Green =

American journalist

Erica L Green
- Education: Goucher College
- Occupation: Journalist
- Employer: The New York Times
- Known for: Education reporting, investigative reporting
- Awards: Pulitzer Prize finalist (2016) Education Writers Association Beat Reporting (2018) Library Journal Best Social Sciences Books (2020) Education Writers Association Moskowitz Prize (2021)

Erica L. Green is an American journalist, currently a White House correspondent for The New York Times. Prior to joining The Times, Green was part of a 2016 Pulitzer Prize finalist team at The Baltimore Sun, nominated for its breaking news coverage of the 2015 killing of Freddie Grey.

Green joined the Washington bureau of The New York Times in 2017, and became a White House correspondent in 2023.

== Early life and education ==
Green graduated from Goucher College in 2007. She lives in Maryland.

== Career ==
Green covered education at The Baltimore Sun, and was on a team that was a 2016 Pulitzer Prize finalist for breaking news coverage of the 2015 killing of Freddie Grey.

Green then moved to Washington bureau of The New York Times, covering education and domestic policy.

Green won a 2018 Education Writers Association Beat Reporting (Large) Staff Award for her investigative reporting, with Katie Benner, exposing academic fraud and child abuse at the T.M. Landry College Preparatory Academy in Louisiana.

In 2023, she became a White House correspondent for The Times.

Green's work has also appeared in ProPublica.

With Wes Moore, Green co-authored the book Five Days: The Fiery Reckoning of an American City, about the uprising in Baltimore following the killing of Freddie Grey. The book was among the Library Journal's best books of 2020. It was also a runner-up for the Porchlight Business Book Awards in the Narrative and Biography category.

With Katie Benner, Green co-authored the book Miracle Children: Race, Education, and a True Story of False Promises, published in 2026 by Macmillan Publishers. The book is based on their 2018 investigative exposé of the T.M. Landry College Preparatory in Louisiana, told in the larger context of both historic and contemporary discrimination against Black children in the U.S. educational system. The school's founders were forging university applications in order to maintain the school's renown for a high acceptance rate to elite universities, as well as physically and emotionally abusing students. In the process, the school also defrauded the parents paying tuition to the school, and failed the students academically.

Green is on the boards of the Education Writers Association and the Spencer Education Journalism Fellowship at Columbia University. She is represented by the AAE Speakers Bureau.

== Recognition ==
- 2016 finalist for a Pulitzer Prize in breaking news reporting, as part of a Baltimore Sun team covering the killing of Freddie Grey
- 2018 Education Writers Association Beat Reporting (Large) Staff for reporting on T.M. Landry Academy
- 2020 Library Journal Best Social Sciences Books for Five Days: The Fiery Reckoning of an American City
- 2021 Education Writers Association Ronald Moskowitz Prize for Outstanding Beat Reporting

== Works ==
- Moore, Wes; Green, Erica L. (2020). Five Days: The Fiery Reckoning of an American City. New York: One World/Ballantine. ISBN 978-0-525-51236-3.
- Benner, Katie; Green, Erica L. (2026-01-13). Miracle Children. Metropolitan Books. ISBN 978-1-250-75910-8.
