= The New York Times Presents =

2019 American docuseries

- Original intertitle as The Weekly
- Genre: Docuseries
- Based on: The Daily
- Country of origin: United States
- Original language: English
- No. of seasons: 3
- No. of episodes: 47

Production
- Executive producers: Banks Tarver; Jason Stallman; Ken Druckerman; Mat Skene; Sam Dolnick; Mary Robertson; Stephanie Preiss
- Running time: 26 minutes (The Weekly); 50 minutes (The New York Times Presents)
- Production companies: The New York Times Company; Left/Right Productions

Original release
- Network: FX
- Release: June 2, 2019 – November 21, 2024

The New York Times Presents (previously The Weekly) is an American narrative investigative journalism docuseries produced by The New York Times for FX and Hulu.

The program has aired in two distinct formats. The first format, The Weekly, was a television spin-off of the daily news podcast, The Daily, that covered recent topical news and cultural stories with the involvement of Times journalists in a half-hour timeslot, and premiered on FX on June 2, 2019. Thirty episodes were ordered for the first season.

On May 26, 2020, the series was renewed for a second season, reformatted as a series of longer documentaries, released approximately monthly, under the new blanket title The New York Times Presents. A third production season, its second season under the NYT Presents title, began airing on May 20, 2022. These documentaries are also distributed internationally under the title The Weekly: Special Edition.

== Broadcast ==
Each episode of The Weekly streamed exclusively on Hulu a day after its FX premiere. Each episode was made available to New York Times subscribers in the United States five weeks after streaming on Hulu. Following the reformatting as The New York Times Presents, new editions are now released on Hulu simultaneously with their FX airings.

Outside the United States, the series is distributed by Red Arrow Studios, parent company of series co-producer Left/Right Productions, and does not usually air on FX's international offshoots.

== Episodes ==
=== The Weekly ===
No.	Title	Feature	Original release date	Prod. code	Viewers (millions)
1	"The Education of T.M. Landry"	T.M. Landry scandal	June 2, 2019	103	0.337
T.M. Landry College Preparatory attracted national attention for sending students to the Ivy League. Erica Green and Katie Benner's investigation proved that the viral success stories were full of deception, and that the truth was much darker.
2	"The Myth of the Medallion"	New York City taxicab medallions	June 9, 2019	102	0.274
New York City taxi drivers have been pushed to bankruptcy, foreclosure, and even suicide. Brian Rosenthal and Emma Graves's year-long investigation into the collapse of the taxi medallion industry reveals how the system was rigged against the drivers, and who profited from it.
3	"Baby Constantin"	President Trump's DACA rescission	June 16, 2019	106	0.335
4	"Collision"	American cyclists killed in Tajikistan	June 23, 2019	101	0.381
5	"Inauguration, Inc."	President Trump's inauguration	June 30, 2019	110	0.321
Using exclusive documents, photographs, interviews and found footage, journalists piece together an anatomy of President Trump's inauguration, the most expensive inaugural weekend in American history.
6	"The End of the Line"	General Motors' electric car initiative	July 7, 2019	109	0.350
Sabrina Tavernise investigates General Motors, an iconic American car company, attempting to transform itself into a technology company, costing thousands of workers their jobs.
7	"Connecting The World"	Facebook scammers	July 28, 2019	107	0.438
Facebook scammers pose as American servicemen and prey on vulnerable women; and the tech company that does little to stop it. Jack Nicas investigates.
8	"Hard Left"	The Green New Deal	August 4, 2019	119	0.417
Astead Herndon reports on young activists pushing the Democratic Party further to "the left" as its presidential candidates vie to unseat President Trump.
9	"The Rabbit Hole"	YouTube	August 11, 2019	114	0.186
YouTube videos were key in the election of Brazilian President Jair Bolsonaro, an extreme right-wing populist, raising the question of the power of the website. Max Fisher and Amanda Taub report.
10	"The Memo"	Opioid abuse in the U.S.	August 18, 2019	118	0.167
In 2007, the U.S. Justice Department had a chance to hold the executives of Purdue Pharma, a drug company, accountable for the escalating opioid epidemic, yet at the last minute the charges were watered down. In the years since, the epidemic has claimed tens of thousands of lives. Journalist Barry Meier investigates what happened inside the Justice Department.
11	"The Six Million Dollar Claim"	Exorbitant medicinal costs	August 25, 2019	112	0.277
12	"Apple's Gold"	Apple Inc.'s iPhone supply chain	September 1, 2019	105	0.300
Nicholas Casey investigates Apple's supply chain, uncovering how the gold in iPhones might trace back to violent paramilitary groups that extort, and sometimes kill, Colombian miners.
13	"The Blueprint"	Russia's interference in international elections	September 8, 2019	104	0.184
Matt Apuzzo investigates Russia's suspected meddling in the U.S. and Estonian elections.
14	"V. Johnson & Johnson"	Johnson & Johnson's baby powder litigation	October 6, 2019	115	0.152
Johnson & Johnson insisted that its baby powder was safe. However, asbestos within the company was linked to ovarian cancer. Reporters Tiffany Hsu and Roni Caryn Rabin investigate.
15	"Rudy! Rudy?"	Rudy Giuliani and the Trump–Ukraine scandal	October 13, 2019	132	0.226
The man once hailed as "America's Mayor" is now at the center of the most confounding political story of the Trump presidency.
16	"Segregated City"	New York City's school system	October 20, 2019	117	0.187
New York's school system is among the most segregated in the country. Student activists are demanding change. Can a new schools chancellor finally deliver equal opportunities for all?
17	"Mr. McGahn"	Don McGahn	October 27, 2019	122	0.217
Most Americans do not know Donald McGahn's name. But they will be living with his legacy for decades to come. The Weekly tells the story of perhaps the most influential person in the Trump Administration.
18	"Guilty By Machine"	Police breathalyzer tests	November 3, 2019	113	0.238
Are police breathalysers fundamentally flawed? Do they even work? The Weekly investigates one of the most widely used forensic tools in law enforcement.
19	"Hands On"	Tantra	November 10, 2019	116	0.226
The Weekly explores why some of us are willing to go along with things at a yoga studio that we might question outside of one, and why many of these methods have gone unexamined for so long.
20	"El Chapo's Son: The Siege of Culiacán"	The Sinaloa Cartel	November 17, 2019	108	0.216
When Mexican forces came to arrest the son of El Chapo, it ignited war on the streets of Culiacan. Using never before seen footage; The Weekly explores how the Sinaloa Drug Cartel took on the Mexican army and won.
21	"Fake Believe"	The deepfake technique	November 24, 2019	123	0.201
Don't trust your eyes. The Weekly goes inside the race to create the first perfect deepfake – an ultrarealistic fake video that could permanently undermine your ability to trust what you see and hear.
22	"The Hot List"	Jeffrey Epstein	December 1, 2019	133	0.150
A mysterious man emerged with an explosive claim: he had thousands of hours of surveillance footage from Epstein's mansions that showed some of the most powerful men in America having sex. Then his story took a turn.
23	"The Gallagher Effect"	Eddie Gallagher	December 29, 2019	130	0.345
Combat Video, text messages, and confidential interviews with members of the Navy SEALs obtained by The New York Times reveals chilling details about the conduct of SOC Edward Gallagher.
24	"My Blood"	Sickle cell disease	January 12, 2020	120	0.164
A 16-year-old girl becomes the youngest person to receive an experimental treatment that could be the first genetic cure for a common disease. Should it work, millions of people from around the world could benefit.
25	"The Endorsement"	The New York Times presidential candidate endorsement process	January 19, 2020	134	0.334
Between coffee-shop chats in Iowa and stump speeches in New Hampshire, candidates for the Democratic nomination for president visited The New York Times for a series of on-the-record conversations.
26	"Fire and Water"	The Siege of the Hong Kong Polytechnic University	February 14, 2020	135	0.213
The Weekly takes a look at the protesters clutching smartphones and wearing masks, and the armour-clad riot police who fired water cannons and tear gas to reassert authority.
27	"The Promise"	Abuse of patients at Willowbrook State School	February 21, 2020	124	0.177
Decades after children endured inhumane treatment at a notorious state institution, some of them were abused again at a group home for adults.
28	"The Sicario"	Alberto Capella's witness program for cartel assassins	February 28, 2020	111	0.220
The Bodies were piling up and Alberto Capella, then the police chief in the Mexican state of Morelos, was desperate. So he turned to a man intimately familiar drug violence.
29	"Balaraba"	Woman who escaped from Boko Haram	March 13, 2020	127	0.255
Balaraba was a teenager when she was kidnapped by Boko Haram fighters in Nigeria. She refused to carry out a suicide bombing, saving dozens of lives. She shares her story for the first time.
30	"Open Arms"	Military Industrial Complex	March 20, 2020	129	0.208
American arms manufacturers are supplying weapons in a war considered one of the world's worst humanitarian crisis. Schools, hospitals and mosques are frequent targets. Why does the U.S allow this? The Trump administration believes it creates jobs.

=== The New York Times Presents ===
==== Season 1 (2020–2021) ====
No. overall	No. in season	Title	Feature	Original release date	Prod. code	Viewers (millions)
1	1	"They Get Brave"	COVID-19 pandemic in New York City	July 10, 2020	201	N/A
2	2	"Dominic Fike, At First"	The rise of Dominic Fike	August 7, 2020	203	N/A
3	3	"The Killing of Breonna Taylor"	Killing of Breonna Taylor	September 4, 2020	204	N/A
4	4	"Hurricane of Fire"	2019–20 Australian bushfire season	September 18, 2020	202	N/A
5	5	"The Teenager Who Hacked Twitter"	2020 Twitter bitcoin scam	November 20, 2020	206	N/A
6	6	"Framing Britney Spears"	The career and conservatorship of Britney Spears	February 5, 2021	205	N/A
7	7	"Who Gets to Be an Influencer?"	The rise of Collab Crib, a collective of Black influencers in Atlanta	June 4, 2021	207	N/A
8	8	"Move Fast & Vape Things"	The creation of Juul and its controversies	September 17, 2021	208	N/A
9	9	"Controlling Britney Spears"	A follow-up to the earlier "Framing Britney Spears", about her conservatorship	September 24, 2021	209	N/A
10	10	"Malfunction: The Dressing Down of Janet Jackson"	Super Bowl XXXVIII halftime show controversy	November 19, 2021	210	0.200
11	11	"To Live and Die in Alabama"	Execution of Nathaniel Woods	December 3, 2021	211	N/A

==== Season 2 (2022–2023) ====
No. overall	No. in season	Title	Feature	Original release date	Prod. code	Viewers (millions)
12	1	"Elon Musk's Crash Course"	Problems with Tesla Autopilot	May 20, 2022	301	N/A
13	2	"Superspreader"	Joseph Mercola propagating pseudoscience and COVID-19 misinformation	August 19, 2022	TBA	N/A
14	3	"Sin Eater: The Crimes of Anthony Pellicano - Part 1"	First part of a 2 part documentary about unscrupulous private investigator Anthony Pellicano	March 10, 2023	TBA	N/A
15	4	"Sin Eater: The Crimes of Anthony Pellicano - Part 2"	Second part of a 2 part documentary about unscrupulous private investigator Anthony Pellicano	March 10, 2023	TBA	N/A
16	5	"The Legacy of J Dilla"	Life and death of rapper J Dilla, known for the 2006 cult instrumental hip hop album Donuts	April 7, 2023	TBA	N/A

==== Season 3 (2023–2024) ====
No. overall	No. in season	Title	Feature	Original release date	Prod. code	Viewers (millions)
17	1	"How to Fix a Pageant"	The purported allegations of Miss USA 2022 being fixed	September 23, 2023	TBA	N/A
18	2	"Broken Horses"	The sobering reality beneath the glitz and glamour of horse racing	April 26, 2024	TBA	N/A
19	3	"Lie To Fly"	An incident occurred on Alaska Airlines Flight 2059 in 2023 when an off duty professional pilot dealing with mental health issues tried to crash an airplane while flying as a passenger.	August 23, 2024	TBA	N/A
20	4	"Weight of the World"	Our culture's relentless pursuit of thinness has led to the rise in the use and misuse of GLP-1 drugs such as Ozempic.	November 21, 2024	TBA	N/A

== Reception ==
=== Critical response ===
On Metacritic, the series has an overall score of 77 out of 100, based on 5 reviews, indicating "generally favorable reviews". On Rotten Tomatoes, the first season has an approval rating of 84% with an average rating of 6.50/10 based on 51 reviews.

=== Accolades ===
Year	Award	Category	Nominee(s)	Result	Ref.
2021	Dorian Awards	Best TV Documentary or Documentary Series	The New York Times Presents	Won	
2021	NAACP Image Awards	Outstanding News/Information (Series or Special)	The New York Times Presents	Won	
2021	Primetime Creative Arts Emmy Awards	Outstanding Documentary or Nonfiction Special	Ken Druckerman, Stephanie Preiss, Mary Robertson, Banks Tarver, Liz Day, Samantha Stark, and Liz Hodes (for "Framing Britney Spears")	Nominated	
2022	Hollywood Critics Association TV Awards	Best Broadcast Network or Cable Docuseries or Non-Fiction Series	The New York Times Presents	Nominated	
2022	News and Documentary Emmy Awards	Outstanding Health or Medical Coverage	"Move Fast & Vape Things"	Nominated	
2022	News and Documentary Emmy Awards	Outstanding Research: News	"Move Fast & Vape Things"	Nominated	
2022	News and Documentary Emmy Awards	Outstanding Arts, Culture or Entertainment Coverage	"Malfunction: The Dressing Down of Janet Jackson"	Won	
2022	News and Documentary Emmy Awards	Outstanding Social Issue Documentary	"To Live and Die in Alabama"	Nominated	
2022	Primetime Creative Arts Emmy Awards	Outstanding Documentary or Nonfiction Special	Mary Robertson, Ken Druckerman, Banks Tarver, Liz Day, Samantha Stark, and Timothy Moran (for "Controlling Britney Spears")	Nominated	
2025	Sports Emmy Awards	Outstanding Journalism	Luke Korem, Esther Dere, Ken Druckerman for "Broken Horses"	Template:Won	
