= Mary Cromwell (disambiguation) =

Mary Cromwell may refer to:

- Mary Cromwell, Countess Fauconberg (?–1713), English noblewoman
- Mary Cromwell Jarrett (1877–1961), American social worker
- Mary Russell Cromwell, English wife of Wingfield Cromwell, 2nd Earl of Ardglass
