= Judy Lewent =

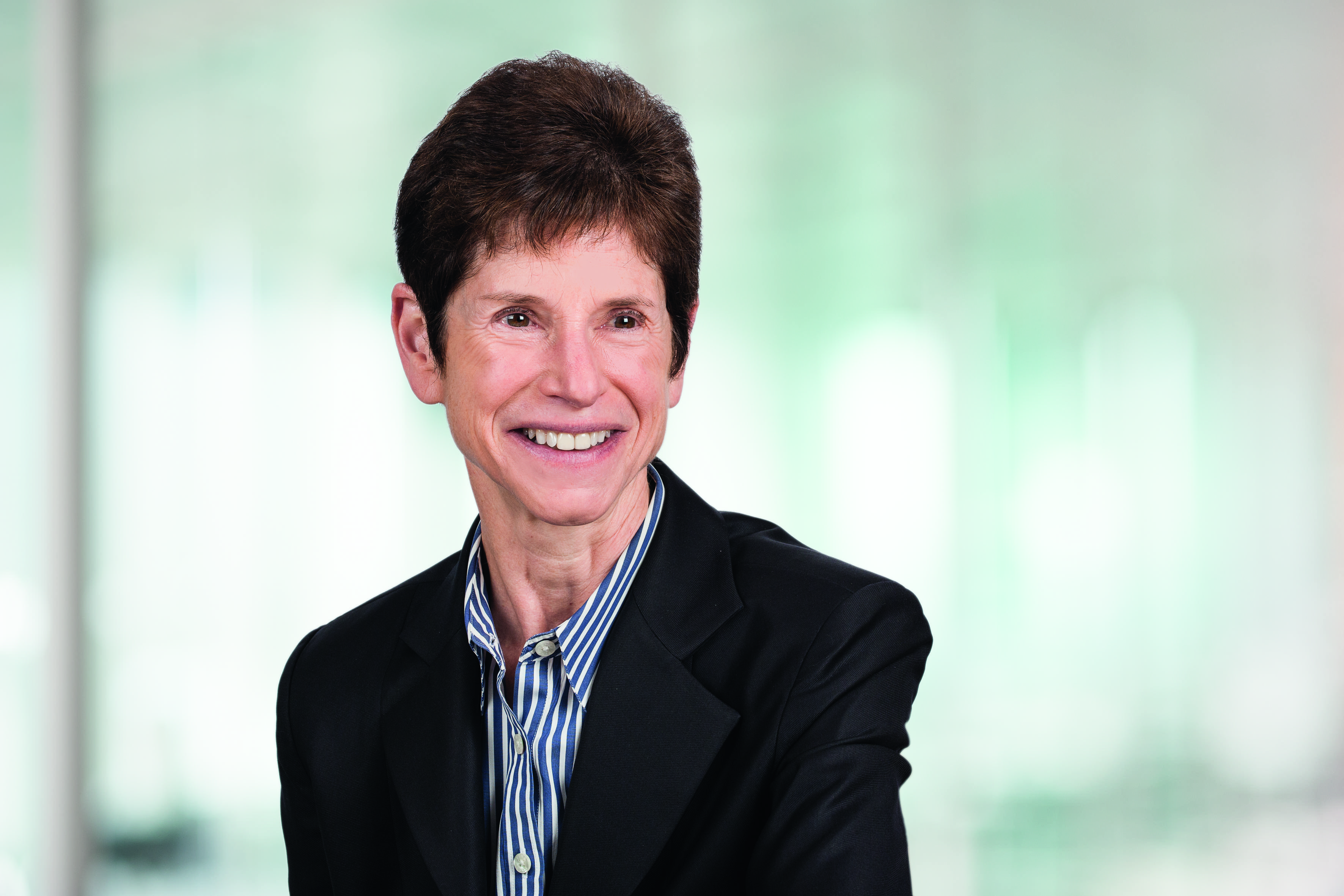
- Judy Lewent in 2012
- Education: Goucher College, MIT Sloan School of Management
- Occupation: Business executive

Judith Carol Lewent is a business executive who served as chief financial officer of Merck & Co. from 1990 until her retirement from the company in 2007. Since her retirement from Merck, she has continued to serve on multiple corporate boards, including the boards of GlaxoSmithKline, Thermo Fisher Scientific and Motorola Solutions. She also served on the board of Purdue Pharma until her departure from the company in 2014.

== Early life ==
Lewent received her high school diploma at Hunter College High School, her B.S. in Economics from Goucher College, and her S.M. in 1972 from the MIT Sloan School of Management with thesis titled The French Open-end Investment Companies (1964 to 1971): an Application of the Capital Asset Pricing Model.

== Career ==
Joining Merck in 1980, Lewent developed a new planning model in 1983 based on the Monte Carlo method, as more traditional financial valuation methods seemed not to take account of the long-term nature of pharmaceutical risks. In 1990, on her appointment as CFO, Lewent took on responsibilities for Merck's overall financial and strategic development, and for licensing matters.

Since then Lewent has also been responsible for Merck's collaboration with Johnson & Johnson in a consumer pharmaceuticals joint venture, for the setting up of the animal health company Merial (a joint venture with the French pharmaceutical company Sanofi-Aventis), and for Merck's ongoing relationships with AstraZeneca and DuPont. She chaired the governing boards of several of these joint ventures.

Lewent is a member of the board of directors of Dell Inc., Motorola and the National Bureau of Economic Research, and a trustee of the Rockefeller Family Fund; she is also a life member of the MIT Corporation, and a member of the American Academy of Arts and Sciences.

Between 26 July and 07 Aug 2007, Lewent sold 200,000 shares of Merck stock for about $10,262,000, according to Securities and Exchange Commission filings.

In February 2007, Merck has announced she will retire and leave the company in July.
