= Ruddy Roye =

Jamaican photographer (born 1969)

- Born: Radcliffe Roye; 12 December 1969 (age 56); Montego Bay, Jamaica
- Education: Goucher College (BA)
- Occupation: Photographer
- Years active: 2000–present
- Website: ruddyroye.com

Radcliffe Roye (born 1969), known professionally as Ruddy Roye is a Jamaican documentary photographer specializing in photojournalism, including editorial and environmental portraits. Roye is a member of the black photographer collective Kamoinge, and was featured in the 2014 documentary Through a Lens Darkly: Black Photographers and the Emergence of a People. Roye was listed among Complex's "50 Greatest Street Photographers Right Now" in 2014, and Time honoured him as its Instagram Photographer of 2016.

== Early life and education ==
Roye was born in Montego Bay, Jamaica, in 1969. At an early age, his mother, Dorcas Leonie Roye, encouraged him to read and participate in speech, drama, and music. At Herbert Morrison Technical High, he participated in band under Snick Glenn and enjoyed his time as a musician. In an interview, Roye stated that if he has not become a photographer, he "would be a writer, a musician, or a professor in that order". He immigrated to the United States in 1990. In 1998, Roye graduated from Goucher College with a bachelor's in English literature where he studied writing and the visual arts. He relocated to Brooklyn, New York, in 2000.

== Career ==
=== Journalism ===
Roye honed his skill as a photojournalist by working as an Associated Press stringer in New York while covering journalism events. He has since worked with publications including The New York Times, Fast Company and BET, Ebony, ESPN Magazine, and Essence.

Roye is also known for documenting Dancehall culture across the world, having traveled as far as Brazzaville in the Congo to document how Jamaicans and other dancers use the language of dance as a tool of activism.

In October 2012, Roye was asked to take over The New Yorker's Instagram account in the wake of Hurricane Sandy. He has also showcased Bed-Stuy (and Brooklyn as a whole) with his 'Black Portraiture' or 'I Can't Breathe' series on Instagram.

=== Art ===
Roye has experimented with interpretative photography, preferring to allow the abstract content within the frame to dictate the voice and purpose of the image. His "Elements" series focuses on "pictorialism", and the blurry picture is said to be his way of transmitting graphic and emotionally raw imagery.

In 2022 Ruddy Roye was named "Artist-in-residence" for the year at the Cleveland Print Room in Cleveland Ohio where he now currently resides.

=== Academic work ===
Roye has taught at New York University, the School of Visual Arts, and Columbia University, engaging in conversations with photography students on the rise of Instagram and the changing face of photojournalism. Some of his work has been contextualized as engaging in the conversation of race in policing and the justice system.

== Exhibitions ==
- "When Living is a Protest" Silber Gallery, Goucher College – Towson, Maryland, May 2018
- "When Living is a Protest" Photoville Brooklyn New York, September 2015 and Steven Kasher Gallery, New York, September 2016.
- "Dandy Lion" – (Re) Articulating Black Masculine Identity- group show – Silver Eye Center for Photography, Pittsburgh, September 18 – November 14, 2015 – MOCP Chicago, April – July 2015
- "Pictures from Paradise" – Group show – Scotiabank Contact Photography Festival- Toronto, May 2014
- Ruddy Roye Solo show – Vermont Feick Fine Arts Center, Green Mountain College, January 2014
- "The New street types of New York" – Alice Austen House – Staten Island New York, July 2013
- "Nigga Beach" – National Biennial Exhibition at the National Gallery, Jamaica, December 2012
- "J'ouvert" CaribBeing:Portraits of Carnival – MoCADA, Brooklyn New York, September 2012
- "J'ouvert" – ARTspeak – City Gallery at Chastain Arts Centre – Atlanta, July 2012
