= Katherine August-deWilde =

American business executive, board member and philanthropist

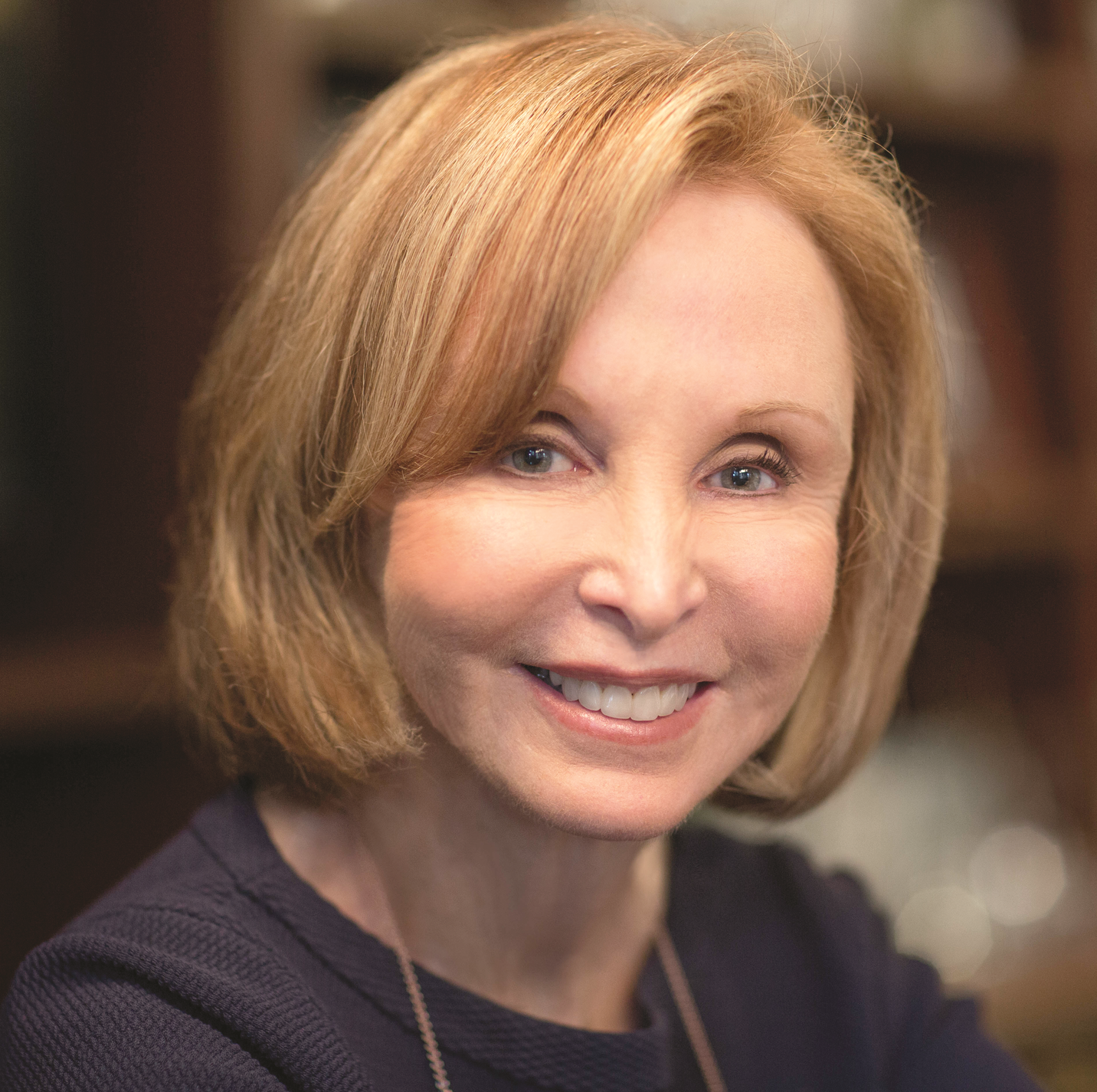
- Born: February 13, 1948 (age 78); Bridgeport, Connecticut
- Education: Goucher College (B.A.); Stanford University (M.B.A.)
- Occupations: Board Member and Philanthropist
- Spouse: David deWilde
- Children: 4

Katherine August-deWilde is an American business executive, board member, and philanthropist. She currently serves as president and CEO of the Partnership for San Francisco. She was the president of First Republic Bank from 2007 to 2015.

== Early life and education ==
August-deWilde was born on February 13, 1948, in Bridgeport, Connecticut, to Edward Burstein and Benita Ruth Miller. She received her bachelor's degree in history from Goucher College in Towson, Maryland, and a Master of Business Administration (MBA) from the Stanford Graduate School of Business.

== Career ==
From 1969 to 1973, August-deWilde held senior staff positions with various members of Congress. She was a consultant for McKinsey & Company from 1975 to 1978, in London and San Francisco. She was also the director of finance for Itel Corporation (now Anixter) from 1978 to 1979. In 1979, August-deWilde became treasurer of PMI Mortgage Insurance Company, later serving as senior vice president and Chief Financial Officer (CFO) from 1982 to 1985.

In 1985, August-deWilde joined First Republic, a San Francisco-based bi-coastal bank offering personal banking, business banking, and trust and wealth management services. August-deWilde joined First Republic as its chief financial officer in 1985 and co-led the bank for 30 years, serving as chief operating officer from 1996 to 2014 and president and COO from 2007 to 2015. She was a board member from 1988-2023 and became vice chair in 2016.

In 2010, three years after Merrill Lynch purchased First Republic and two years after Bank of America acquired Merrill Lynch, August-deWilde, as president and COO, co-led a management buy-back with private equity partners.

August-deWilde was named president and CEO of the Partnership for San Francisco in April 2025. In this role, she leads the private-sector entity that brings business, government, labor, media and civic officials together to accelerate solutions to the City's most pressing challenges.

=== Board memberships ===
August-deWilde currently serves on the boards of Sunrun, Instawork, and the San Francisco Housing Accelerator Fund. She has served as a member of many councils and boards, including the Advisory Council of the Stanford Graduate School of Business, the Advisory Council of the Stanford Center on Longevity, Catalyst Corporate Board Resource, The Committee of 200, Equilar, Eventbrite, Newfront, OpenGov, Tipping Point Community, and TriNet. She previously served as vice-chair of the Town School for Boys and as a trustee of the Boys and Girls Clubs of San Francisco and the Carnegie Foundation for the Advancement of Teaching. She was a member of the policy advisory board of the Center for Real Estate and Urban Economics, University of California, Berkeley. She was a 2018 fellow in the Stanford Distinguished Careers Institute cohort and previously served on the board of the Clayman Institute for Gender Research at Stanford University.

=== Philanthropy ===
In 2008, August-deWilde and her husband seeded a professorship at the Stanford Graduate School of Business in honor of Professor George Parker. In 2012, they founded the Katherine and David deWilde Faculty/Scholar fund at the Stanford Graduate School of Business to support work on entrepreneurship in developing economies. They also funded the Stanford GSB deWilde Junior Faculty Fund and the deWilde Sloan/MSx Program Fund.

In 2012, they established the LGBT Summer Fellowship at University of Virginia School of Law to support outstanding law students working on legal matters of national and cultural importance to the lesbian, gay, bisexual, and transgender community. In 2015, they created the Katherine and David deWilde Endowed and Expendable Funds for Women's Achievement.

In 2018, Katherine August-deWilde received the Excellence in Leadership Award from Stanford Graduate School of Business.

== Personal life ==
August-deWilde lives in San Francisco with her husband, David deWilde, a lawyer and investor. She has four children. In 2021, she listed her modern farmhouse located in Sonoma for $7 million.

== Honors ==
- 1985, Working Woman, “The Breakthrough Generation: 73 Women Ready to Run Corporate America”
- 2003, 2005, 2006, San Francisco Business Times, “Most Influential Women in Bay Area Business”
- 2008, Legal Momentum, Women of Achievement Award
- 2008 - 2013, San Francisco Business Times, “Most Influential Women in Bay Area Business”
- 2012, Women's Initiative for Self-Employment, Founder's Award
- 2012, Directors & Boards, “Directors to Watch”
- 2015, Private Asset Management, “50 Most Influential Women in Private Wealth”
- 2019, Most Influential Corporate Board Directors, WomenInc.
