= Edgar Kunz =

American poet

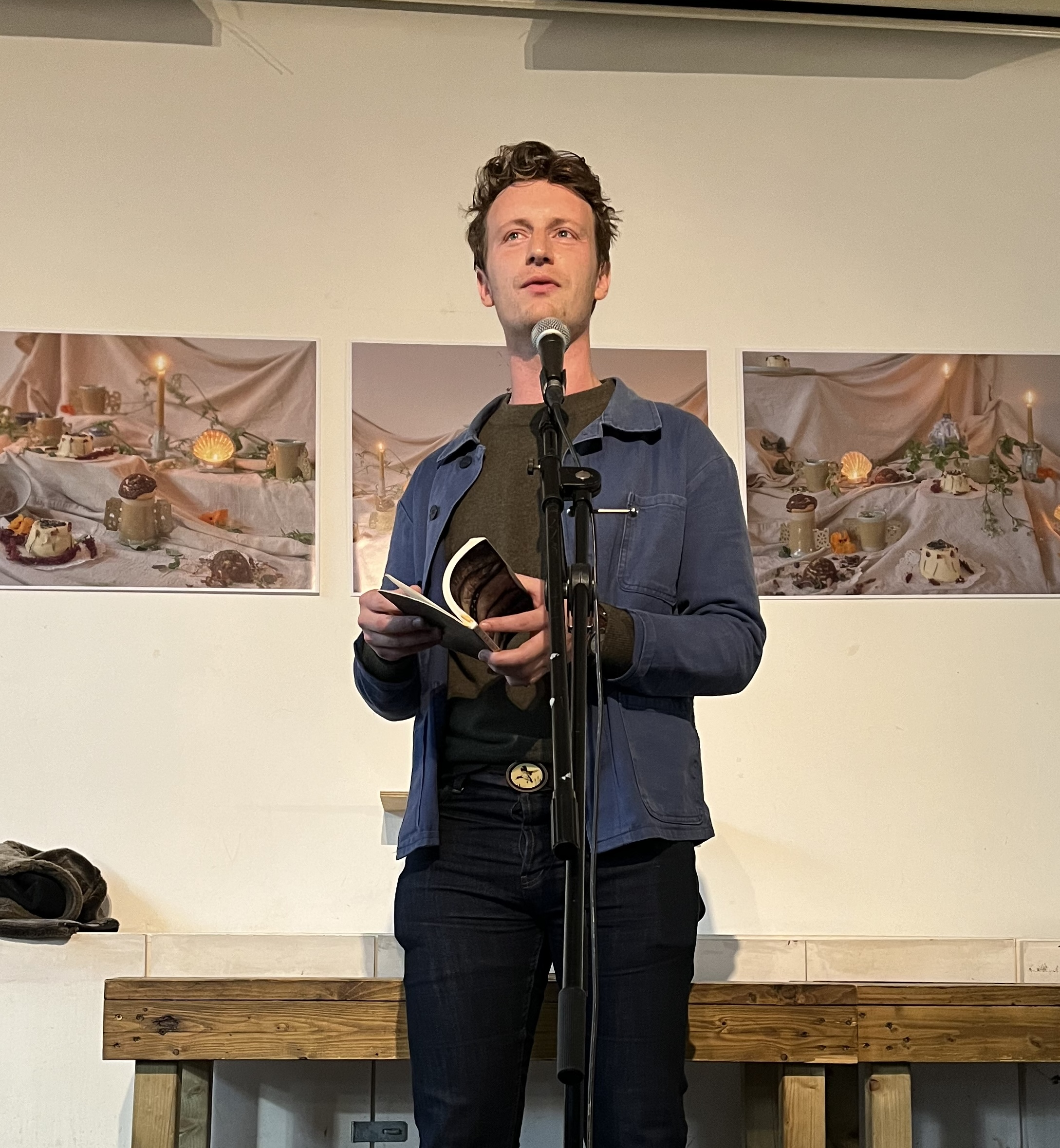
- Kunz reading at The Peckham Pelican in London, UK, in 2023.
- Born: 1988 (age 37–38)
- Occupations: Poet, Professor
- Writing career
- Language: English
- Notable works: Tap Out, Fixer
- Notable awards: Guggenheim Fellowship, National Endowment for the Arts Literature Fellowship, Stegner Fellowship
- Website: www.edgarkunz.com

Edgar Kunz (born 1988) is an American poet.

He is the author of Fixer, published by Ecco in 2023, and Tap Out, published by Ecco in 2019.

In 2026, he was awarded a Guggenheim Fellowship from the John Simon Guggenheim Memorial Foundation.

== Early life and education ==
Kunz was born in Framingham, Massachusetts. His father, who features in his writing, was a chimney sweep and handyman. He attended public schools in Massachusetts and Connecticut and started writing poetry as a student at Manchester Community College.

He earned his BA in English from Goucher College in 2010. He went on to earn his MFA in Creative Writing from Vanderbilt University in 2015 and was a Wallace Stegner Fellow at Stanford University from 2015-2017.

== Career ==
Kunz was awarded a National Endowment for the Arts Literature Fellowship in 2017, named a MacDowell Fellow in 2018, and awarded an Individual Artist Grant from the Maryland State Arts Council in 2022. He has also received fellowships and awards from the Bread Loaf Writers’ Conference, the Sewanee Writers’ Conference, and the Academy of American Poets.

Individual poems and essays have appeared in The New Yorker, The Atlantic, Poetry, Oxford American, Literary Hub, American Poetry Review, and Yale Review.

From 2018 to 2025, Kunz taught creative writing at his alma mater, Goucher College, where he was the Assistant Director of the Kratz Center for Creative Writing. Kunz currently teaches in the English Department and Creative Writing MFA program at Virginia Commonwealth University and in the low-residency Newport MFA at Salve Regina University.

== Critical reception ==
Fixer received a positive full-page review in The New York Times. Reviewer Jeff Gordinier notes that Kunz “demonstrates a hard familiarity with the gig economy” and that “Reading Fixer, you can’t help thinking of Raymond Carver and the way that his blue-collar, stripped-to-the-bone style served as a corrective in the 1980s.” The review also remarks on the poet’s dark humor and his continued interest in the themes of hustle culture, the working class, addiction, and grief. Electric Literature named it one of the Best Poetry Collections of 2023. Ron Charles of The Washington Post called the book “an arresting vision buoyed by Kunz’s wry wit."

Tap Out was named a “New & Noteworthy” collection by The New York Times and received praise from The Washington Post, who called it “a gritty, insightful debut.” The book received a starred review from Publishers Weekly and was released in an Italian edition by Fuorilinea Editore in 2021.

== Books ==
- Fixer. Ecco/HarperCollins. 2023. ISBN 978-0063288591
- Tap Out. Ecco/HarperCollins. 2019. ISBN 978-1328518125
