= To Live and Die in Alabama =

2021 American documentary film

- Directed by: Matt Kay
- Starring: Nathaniel Woods (archival footage); Chris McAlpine; Christina Bishop; Michael Blalock; Rita Briles; Tyran "Bubba" Cooper; Curtis Crane; Andrea Elders; Annetta Nunn; Kimberly Chisholm Simmons; Kerry Spencer; Cynthia Umstead; Deandrez Walters; Nathaniel Woods Sr.; Heavenly Woods; Pamela Woods
- Production company: The New York Times
- Distributed by: Hulu; FX
- Release date: December 3, 2021
- Running time: 69 minutes
- Country: United States
- Language: English

To Live and Die in Alabama is a 2021 documentary film, directed by Matt Kay. It focuses on the circumstances leading to the 2004 arrest and controversial 2020 execution of Nathaniel Woods and the killings for which he was convicted. The film was aired on FX on December 3, 2021, and was made available on Hulu shortly after. A month later, it was released on the New York Times' website. The film is a part of the New York Times Presents documentary series.

== Synopsis ==
Nathaniel Woods was convicted of capital murder in the killings of three police officers in Birmingham, Alabama. Despite never pulling a trigger, Woods was accused by the state of being an accomplice to the shooter, Kerry Spencer.

The film features interviews from Woods, Spencer, family members of Woods and the deceased officers, and others involved in the case. Woods's family believes in his innocence, while opinions from family members of the deceased officers are mixed; Kimberly Chisholm Simmons, the sister of deceased officer Harley Chisholm III, defends Woods in the documentary and believes in his innocence, while Andrea Elders, the daughter of deceased officer Carlos Owen, believes Woods was "the whole entire reason" that the murders occurred.

== Cast ==
All star as themselves.

△ = Believes Woods is guilty
〇 = Believes Woods is innocent

- Nathaniel Woods (archival footage)
- Chris McAlpine, juror △
- Christina Bishop, alternate juror 〇
- Michael Blalock, defense counsel for Kerry Spencer 〇
- Rita Briles, defense counsel for Nathaniel Woods 〇
- Tyran "Bubba" Cooper, Woods's cousin 〇
- Curtis Crane, juror △
- Andrea Elders, daughter of deceased officer Carlos Owen △
- Annetta Nunn, Birmingham police chief (2003-2007) △
- Kimberly Chisholm Simmons, sister of deceased officer Harley Chisholm III 〇
- Kerry Spencer, shooter 〇
- Cynthia Umstead, defense counsel for Nathaniel Woods 〇
- Deandrez Walters, son of Nathaniel Woods 〇
- Nathaniel Woods Sr., father of Nathaniel Woods 〇
- Heavenly Woods, sister of Nathaniel Woods 〇
- Pamela Woods, sister of Nathaniel Woods 〇
