= T.M. Landry College Preparatory =

Shuttered school in Breaux Bridge, LA

Location
- 1800 Rees Street; Breaux Bridge, St. Martin Parish, Louisiana 70517; United States
- Coordinates: 30°17′19″N 91°54′32″W

Information
- Founded: 2005
- Founders: Tracey & Mike Landry
- Closed: 2022
- Principal: Tracey Landry

T.M. Landry College Preparatory (also known simply as T.M. Landry) was an unaccredited, co-educational private college-preparatory school in Breaux Bridge, Louisiana for grades K–12. The school initially made headlines for its 100% acceptance rate into 4-year colleges, but received negative attention in 2018 as the subject of an investigative report by The New York Times, detailing allegations of abuse of students and fabrication of transcripts and college applications. In 2019, the Federal Bureau of Investigation launched an investigation on the school. Following the controversy, the school's co-founders, Michael and Tracey Landry, stepped down from the school board but continued to serve as teachers at the school. As of 2022, the school has been closed.

== History ==
T.M. Landry was originally established as a homeschool for five children in 2005. The founders of the school are Michael Landry, a former salesman and a certified teacher since 2002, and his wife Tracey Landry, who worked as a nurse prior to establishing the school and served as the school's principal. The school became an unaccredited private school for grades K–12. The state of Louisiana did not recognize the school's diploma but the school followed Louisiana state standards.

T.M. Landry moved into a former factory building in 2017. According to the school website, 142 students were enrolled in 2018, and the average class size was six students in primary school and 12 students in middle and high school. Tuition cost up to $675 a month. The school did not use textbooks, issue homework, or assign specific class schedules.

== Media attention ==
=== College acceptances ===
T.M. Landry was the subject of many national news features. Local television news outlets in Breaux Bridge and Louisiana have profiled the school. The school became the focus of national media attention in December 2016 after one high school senior was accepted into Cornell University. T.M. Landry students were accepted into other prestigious schools, including: Harvard University, Boston University, Tulane University, Brown University, and New York University. In October 2018, NBC's show Today reported that T.M. Landry boasted a 100% college acceptance rate. T.M Landry students were profiled on the Today show, Ellen, and CBS Morning News.

=== Allegations of abuse and transcript falsifications ===
In a New York Times article published in November 2018, authors Erica L. Green and Katie Benner reported evidence that the school falsified transcripts, academic achievements, and community service on its students' applications to Ivy League schools. The article detailed accusations that the Landrys ran their school through fear and physical and emotional abuse. Numerous students and teachers support these allegations. Some of them reported that "students were forced to kneel on rice, rocks and hot pavement, and were choked, yelled at and berated." Accusations against Michael Landry include striking students and making one student eat rat feces. Landry admitted that he hit students, and he goaded white and black students to compete against each other. Students said that Landry told them he would ruin their chances of acceptance to college if they spoke of the abuse. In an interview with The New York Times, Landry denied the allegations of abuse.

== Investigations ==
In December 2018, Louisiana State Police began an investigation into the abuse allegations.

In April 2019, the Lafayette Daily Advertiser and Lafayette's News 15 reported that a group hired by T.M. Landry found no evidence to support allegations against the school. Investigators stated the attorney for the families who spoke with The New York Times declined to make them available for interviews or provide any documents supporting allegations of abuse.

In June 2019, The New York Times reported that FBI was investigating the college applications submitted by students at T. M. Landry.

== Documentaries ==
The school was also the subject of a half hour documentary film, The Education of T.M. Landry, presented as the first episode of the new TV series produced by The New York Times called The Weekly which made its debut on FX and Hulu in June, 2019.

Another documentary film about the school, Accepted, premiered on June 12, 2021, at the Tribeca Film Festival. It was directed by Dan Chen and produced by Chen, Jason Y. Lee, Jesse Einstein, and Mark Monroe. The film is set in the 2019 school year.
