= Goucher College =

Private liberal arts college in Towson, Maryland, US

- Former names: Woman's College of Baltimore City (1885–1890); Woman's College of Baltimore (1890–1910)
- Motto: Gratia et Veritas (Latin)
- Motto in English: Grace and Truth
- Type: Private liberal arts college
- Established: 1885; 141 years ago
- Academic affiliations: NAICU; CIC; AG
- Endowment: $292.7 million (2024)
- President: Kent Devereaux
- Faculty: 203
- Undergraduates: 1,000
- Postgraduates: 500
- Location: Towson, Maryland, United States
- Campus: Suburban, 287 acres (116 ha)
- Colors: Blue and gold
- Nickname: Gophers
- Sporting affiliations: NCAA Division III – Landmark Conference
- Mascot: Rowdy
- Website: goucher.edu

- Goucher College
- U.S. National Register of Historic Places
- U.S. Historic district
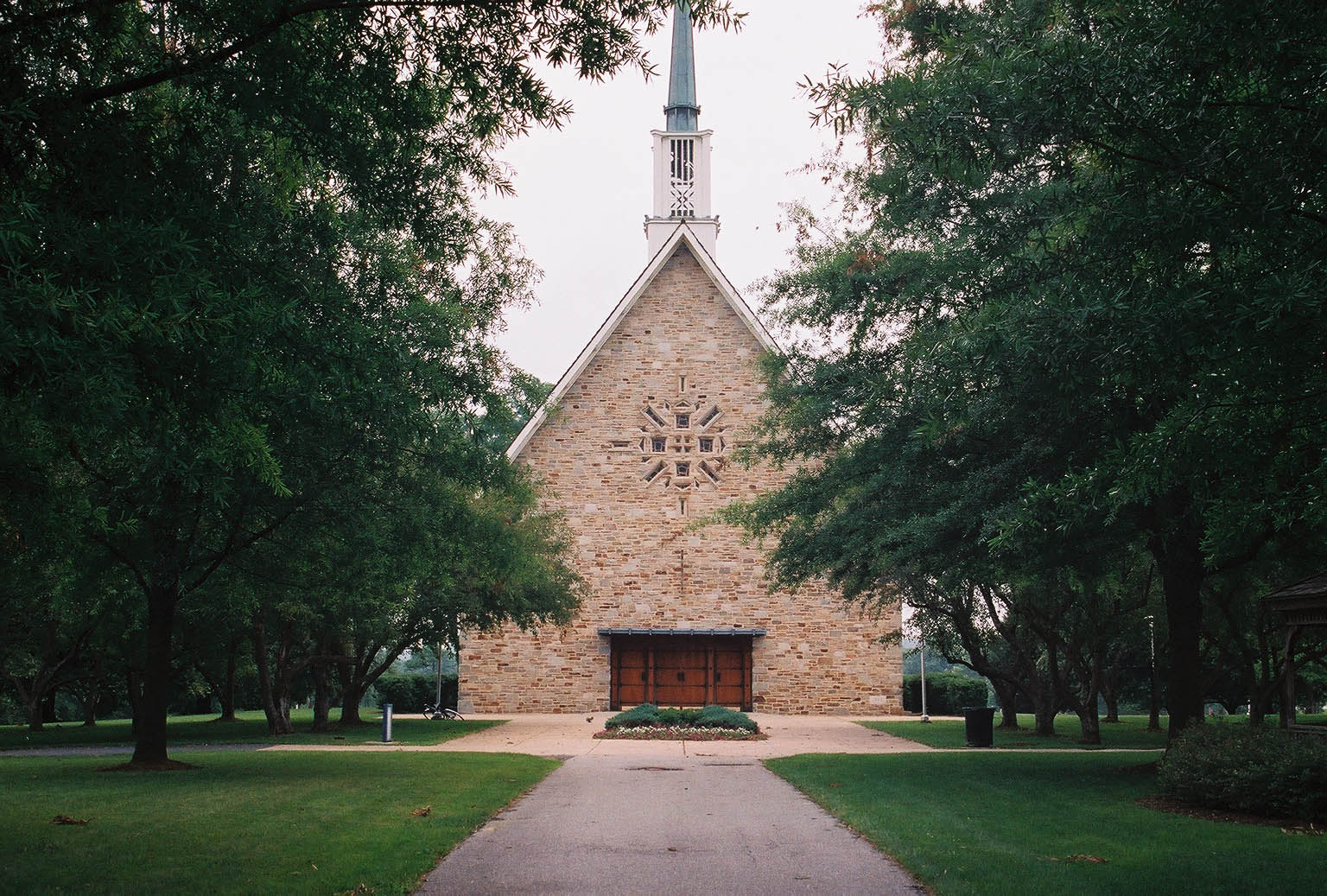
- Facade of the non-denominational Haebler Memorial Chapel at the center of Goucher's campus

- Location within Maryland Location within the United States
- Location: 1021 Dulaney Valley Road, Towson, Maryland
- Coordinates: 39°24′28″N 76°35′32″W
- Area: 287 acres (116 ha)
- Built: 1921
- Architect: Moore & Hutchins; Sasaki, Hideo, et al.
- Architectural style: Modern Movement
- NRHP reference No.: 07000885
- Added to NRHP: August 28, 2007

Goucher College (/ˈɡaʊtʃər/ GOW-chər) is a private liberal arts college in Towson, Maryland, United States. Founded in 1885 as a nonsectarian women's college in Baltimore's central district, the college is named for pastor and missionary John F. Goucher, who enlisted local leaders of the Methodist Episcopal Church to establish the school's charter. Goucher relocated to its Towson campus in 1953, and became coeducational in 1986, after 101 years as a women's college.

Goucher grants BA and BS degrees in a range of disciplines across 31 majors and 39 minors. Since 2006, Goucher has required all undergraduates to complete a study abroad experience. Goucher is a member of the Landmark Conference and competes in the NCAA's Division III in lacrosse, tennis, soccer, volleyball, basketball, and horseback riding. It also offers a postbaccalaureate premedical program, master's programs in the arts and humanities, and professional development courses in writing and education. The Goucher library holds the largest Jane Austen collection in North America, including first and rare editions, period publications, and 20th-century ephemera related to Austen. As of 2026, Goucher enrolls approximately 1,000 undergraduates and 500 graduate students.

The Princeton Review included Goucher in its 2019 edition of the "Best 384 Colleges" and ranked it No. 5 in "Most Popular Study Abroad Program". Goucher was recognized as a top producer of Fulbright scholars by The Chronicle of Higher Education in 2018. It was also profiled in the book Colleges that Change Lives by Loren Pope as one of forty institutions. The school was one of the first in the country to require a study abroad of all undergraduates, along with Susquehanna University and Soka University of America. Goucher counts notable alumni in law, business, journalism, academia, poetry, and government, including New York Times journalist Erica L. Green, conservative journalist Jonah Goldberg, former first lady of Puerto Rico Lucé Vela, Judge Ellen Lipton Hollander of the District Court for the District of Maryland, poets Ellen Bass and Edgar Kunz, 27th Vice Commandant of the United States Coast Guard Sally Brice-O'Hara, former president of First Republic Bank Katherine August-DeWilde, and the third president of California State University, San Marcos, Karen S. Haynes.

== History ==
Early in its history, Goucher played an important role nationally in providing women access to higher education. Many ground-breaking women doctors, researchers, and scientists graduated from Goucher in the early 20th century, including Hattie Alexander, Florence B. Seibert, and Margaret Irving Handy. Judge Sarah T. Hughes of Texas, who was famously photographed administering the presidential oath of office to Lyndon B. Johnson aboard Air Force One, graduated from Goucher in 1917. A daughter of President Woodrow Wilson, Jessie Woodrow Wilson Sayre, also graduated Goucher and went on to play a significant role in the women's suffrage movement.

=== 19th century ===
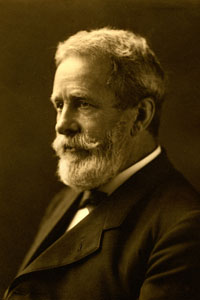
The college was renamed to "Goucher College" in 1910. The college's namesake, John F. Goucher, served as its second president.

In 1881, the Baltimore Conference of the Methodist Episcopal Church passed a resolution to found a seminary. The proposal was met with some objection, with one member stating, "I would not give a fig for a weakling little thing of a seminary. We want such a school, so ample in its provisions, of such dignity in its buildings, so fully provided with the best apparatus, that it shall draw to itself the eyes of the community and that young people shall feel it an honor to be enrolled among its students." Minister and conference member John B. Van Meter asserted "that the Conference [should] make the foundation and endowment of a female college the single object of its organized effort."

Van Meter was joined by fellow minister John Franklin Goucher (1845–1922) and together they eventually persuaded the conference to found a college, instead. Subsequently, the Woman's College of Baltimore City ("City" was later dropped) was chartered on January 26, 1885. It opened its doors in 1888, and four years later graduated its first class of just five students.

John F. Goucher, despite being the school's namesake and co-founder, was not the college's first president. Although offered the post, he declined, and it went to William Hersey Hopkins, who had served as president of St. John's College in Annapolis. After Hopkins resigned in 1890 to join the faculty, the board of trustees voted unanimously to renominate Goucher. Under pressure from the board, Goucher relented and accepted the position, which he held for nearly two decades. Goucher and his wife Mary Cecilia Fisher made significant financial contributions to the college, including the bequest of a portion of his estate.

=== 20th century ===
During President Goucher's tenure, enrollment grew but the college suffered financial deficits. In 1904, the college became the second in Maryland to establish a Phi Beta Kappa chapter, after Johns Hopkins University. Goucher stepped down in 1908 to resume his international missionary work but remained involved with the school as president emeritus until his death in 1922. In 1910, the school was renamed Goucher College in his honor.

In 1913, the college inaugurated its fourth president, William W. Guth, who oversaw the construction of several new residence halls and a successful million-dollar fundraising campaign.

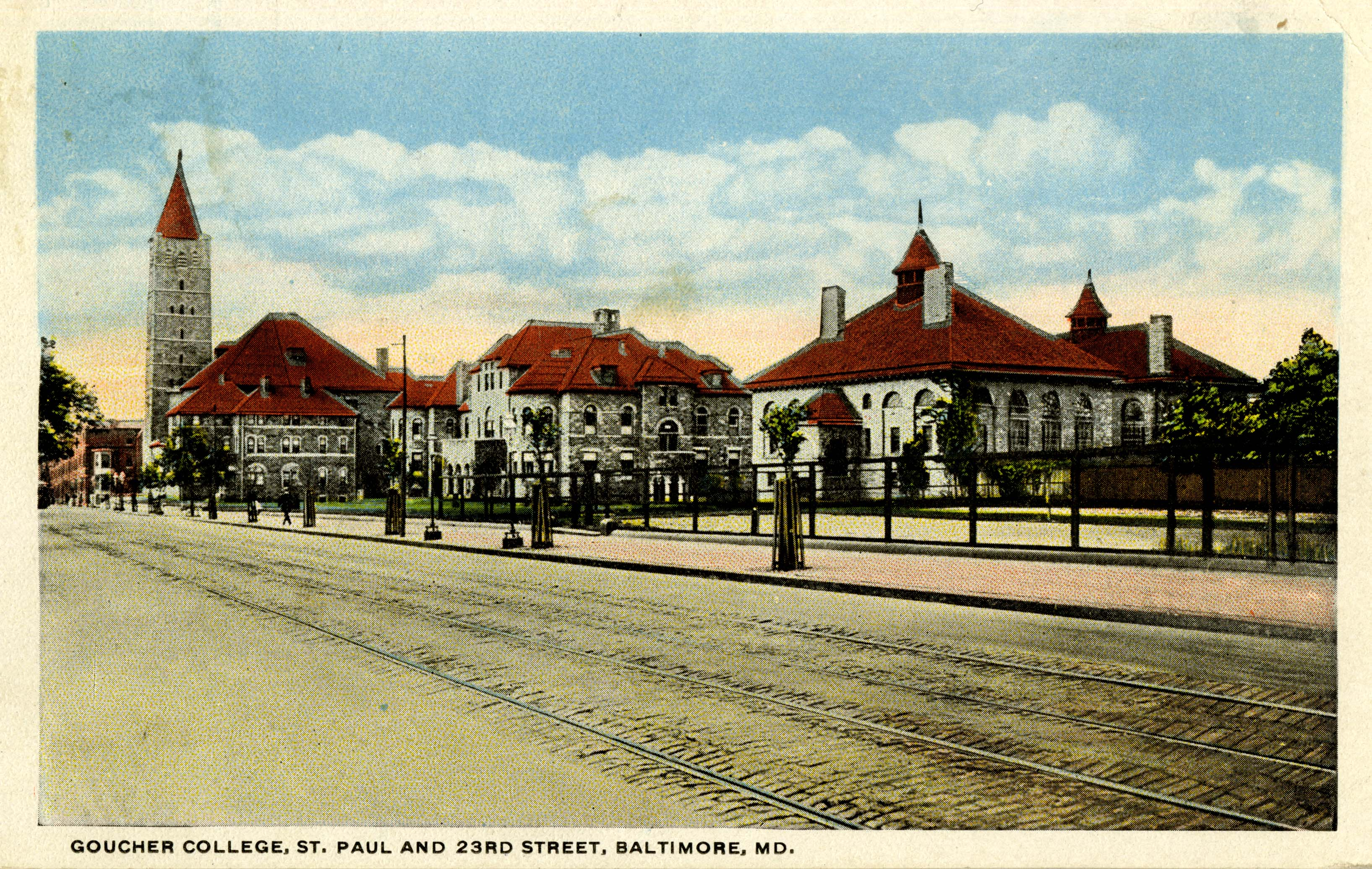
A colorized postcard photo of Goucher's Baltimore campus circa 1920.

Around this time, U.S. President Woodrow Wilson, whose daughter Jessie was a Goucher alumna, expressed support for the college's fundraising efforts in correspondence with the administration, writing in March 1913, "It would, indeed, be ... evidence that our great educational public does not fully understand its own interests if an institution which has served with such faithfulness ... in the cause of woman's education should be allowed to break up for the lack of money." By 1914, Goucher was one of six "Class I" colleges for women in the U.S. In 1921, Goucher purchased 421 acres of land in nearby Towson that had belonged to the estate of a prominent Baltimore family, for $150,000. The move from Baltimore to the Towson suburbs was completed in 1953.

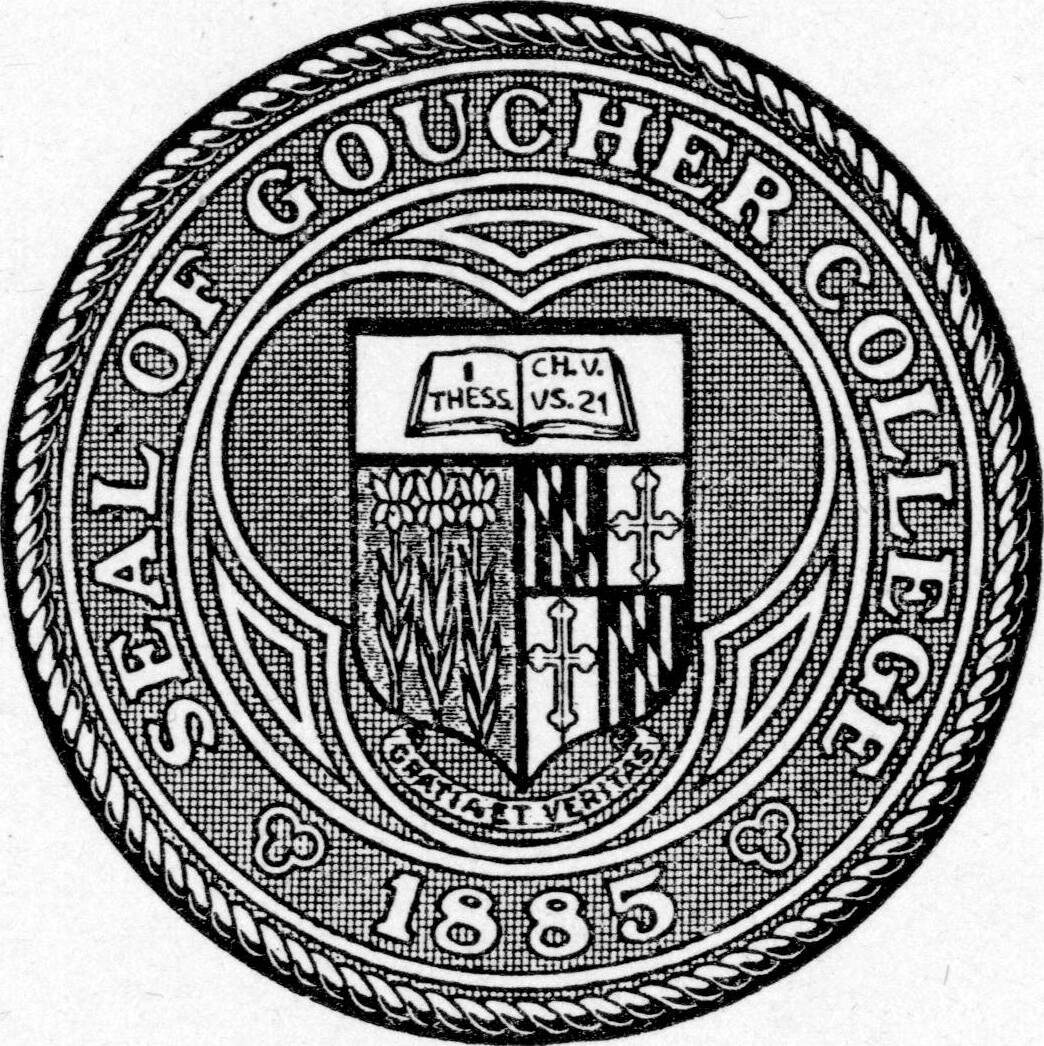
The college's original seal

Before 1950, Goucher hosted nearly a dozen sorority chapters on campus including Kappa Kappa Gamma, Kappa Alpha Theta, Gamma Phi Beta, and Pi Beta Phi, but they were disbanded on the move to Towson.

Goucher turned coeducational in 1986 when the board of trustees voted to admit men, citing declining enrollment and reduced national interest by women in single-sex colleges. The decision was controversial among many students and a minority of alumnae. However, it was followed by increased enrollment and sustained support from the school's donors, with Goucher's endowment growing nearly five-fold from $45 million in 1986. President Rhoda M. Dorsey, who also initially resisted the proposal, relented and presided over the transition.

==== Old Goucher ====
Goucher's former Baltimore campus became known as Old Goucher. The school maintained no affiliation with the property after its sale. The complex was added to the National Register of Historic Places in 1978. Many of its Romanesque structures have been preserved and re-purposed for commercial, public, and residential use. The school's Towson campus was added to the historic register in 2007.

== Campus ==
Goucher occupies a green, wooded 287-acre (1.16 km^{2}) campus just northeast of downtown Towson. Surrounding the central campus infrastructure is a dense forest, owned by the school, which features low hills and hiking and jogging trails, some of which are also used by the college's equestrian riders. The non-denominational Haebler Memorial Chapel lies near the center of campus. A walking path, called the Van Meter Highway, connects to most of the college's residential, academic, recreational, and athletic buildings, while one road, the Loop Road, circles campus. Newsweek magazine described the campus as "unusually bucolic". It has also been referred to by CBS Baltimore as one of Baltimore County's most scenic college campuses.

A scene at the fictional Hammond University from the fourth season of the Netflix series House of Cards was filmed on Goucher's campus, with most shots taking place at the Athenaeum and the Rhoda M. Dorsey College Center.

=== Academic buildings ===
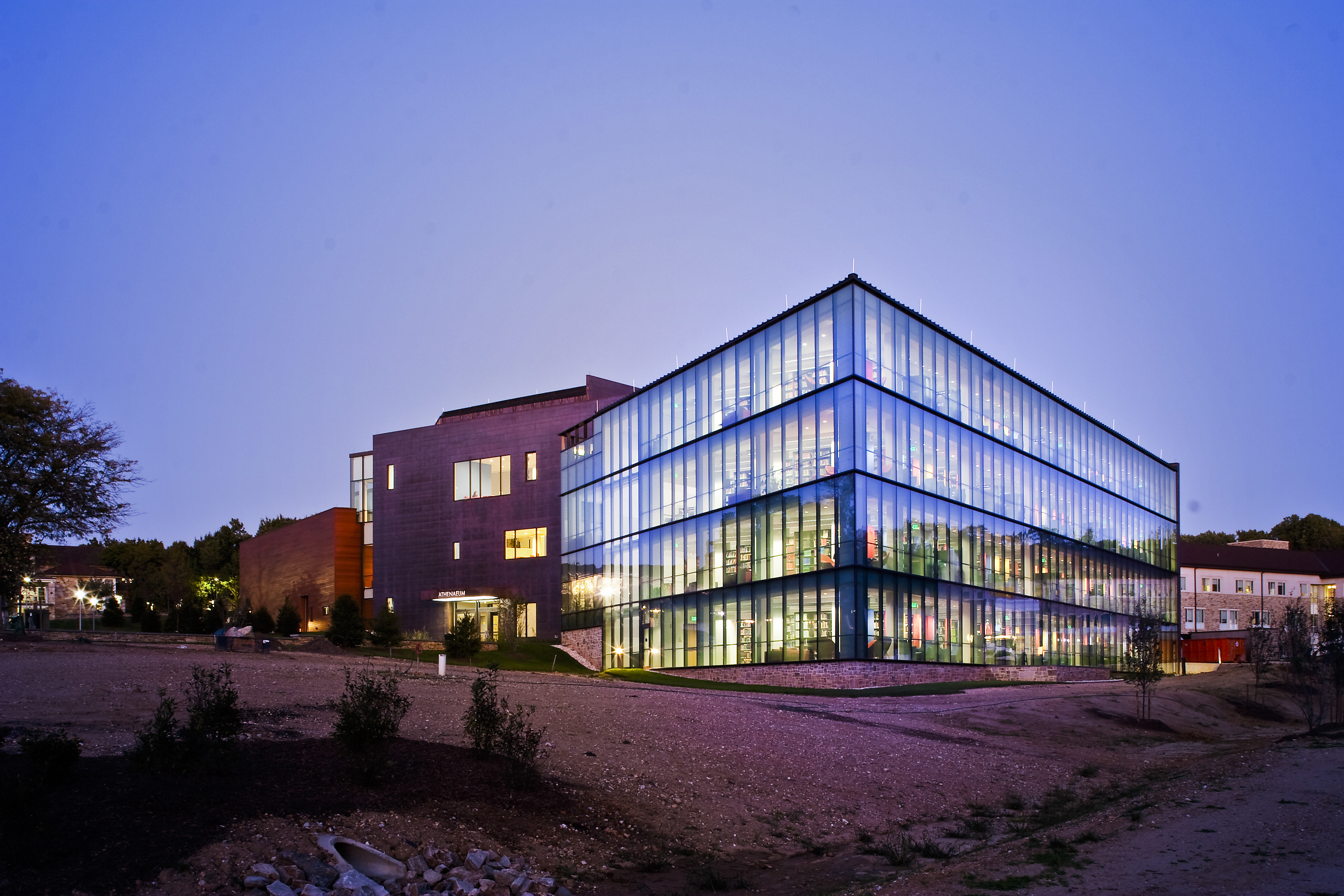
Sanford J. Ungar Athenaeum

Goucher's main academic buildings, including Van Meter Hall and Julia Rogers, are located at the northern portion of campus, called the "academic quad". The Hoffberger Science Building houses the school's science departments and is adjacent to the Meyerhoff Arts Building, which contains a theater, photo studio, and several galleries and where the dance, theater, and art departments are based. Student Administrative Services and the admissions office are located in the Rhoda M. Dorsey College Center. Near the center of the campus and opposite Mary Fisher Hall is the Athenaeum, or "the Ath", a 100,000-square-foot (9,300 m^{2}) modern, multipurpose facility built in 2009 encompassing the main library, a restaurant, classrooms, lecture halls, and an open auditorium. The Athenaeum is where speakers who visit the campus are typically hosted. The Merrick Lecture Hall, a partial amphitheater situated near Van Meter Hall, is also a venue for on-campus recitals, performances, sponsored political debates, and other productions. In April 2025, the college broke ground on the Judy C. Lewent '70 Science Center, a 47,000-square-foot (4,400 m^{2}) annex to the Hoffberger Science Building slated to open in fall 2027.

=== Housing ===
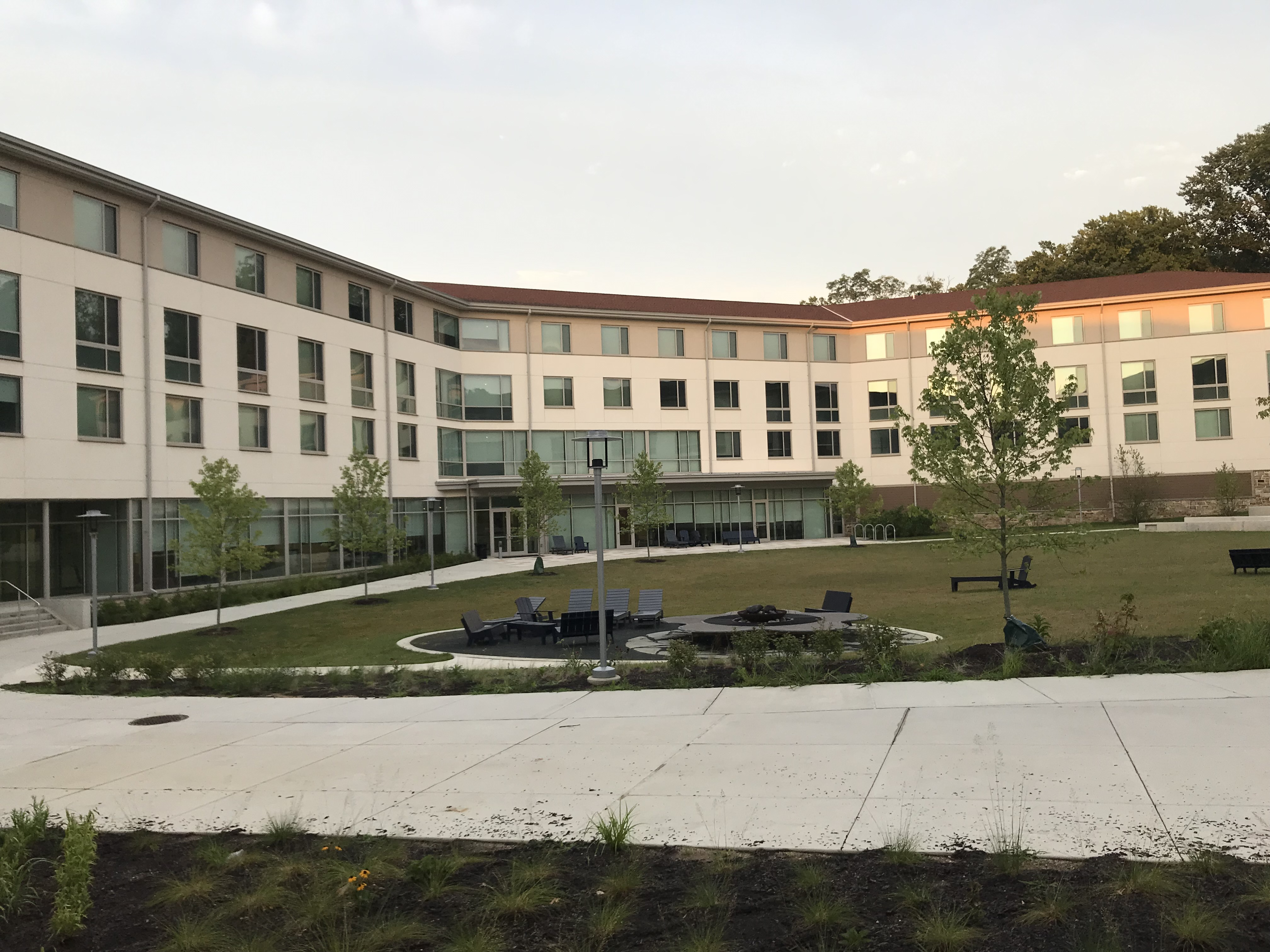
Pagliaro-Selz Hall

The college's residence halls are concentrated on the south side of campus. They are Heubeck, Froelicher, Mary Fisher, Sondheim, Stimson, and Welsh Hall, known by students as "the T" for its T-shaped design, which was completed in 2005. In 2018, the school completed construction of the "First-Year Village" for freshmen, which includes Pagliaro-Selz Hall, Fireside Hall, and Trustees Hall. Campus housing for students includes singles, doubles, triples, suites, and on-campus apartments. Sondheim Hall, also known as the Wellness House, is the sole residence hall designated as substance-free. In July 2018, Goucher announced a campus-wide ban on cigarettes and smoking devices like electronic cigarettes. In 2025, students living in Welsh Hall were required to move to Froelicher Hall at the beginning of the fall semester due to moisture intrusion, and the residence hall remained closed for the duration of the semester.

=== Athletic and recreational facilities ===
The campus's outdoor sports facilities include a 107,000 square foot turf stadium field named Gopher Stadium, three grass practice fields, an outdoor track, twelve tennis courts that opened in 2019 as part of the Evelyn Dyke Schroedl '62 Tennis Center, as well as separate courts for racquetball and squash, and an equestrian center. The Decker Sports and Recreation Center contains a six-lane, 25-yard pool, dance studios, a basketball court, gymnasium, varsity locker rooms, a fully equipped weight room, and a cardio fitness center. The equestrian center lies on the northernmost edge of campus and contains two barns, 10 turnout paddocks, indoor and outdoor riding rings, and several riding fields, in addition to wooded trails shared with pedestrians.

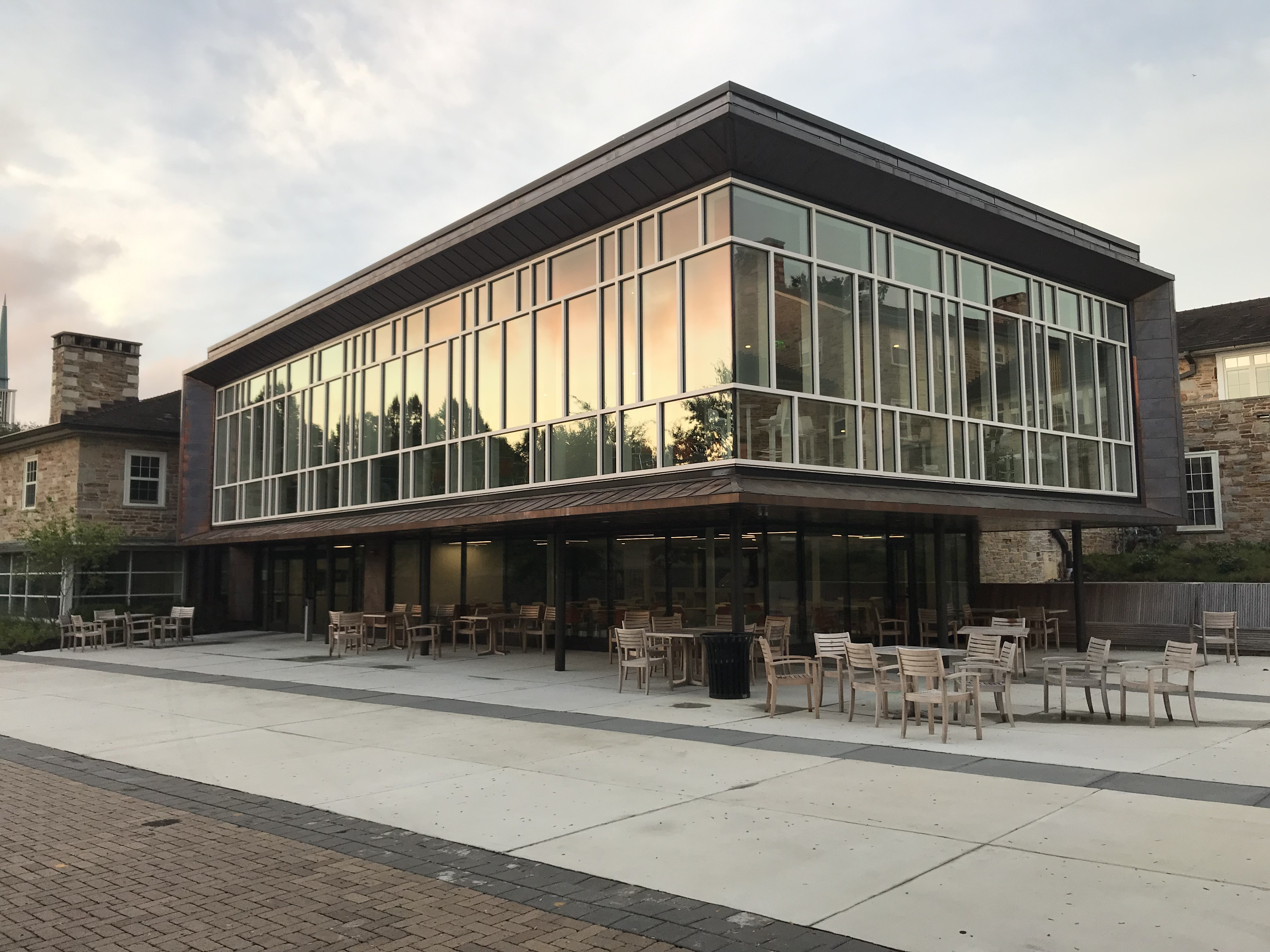
Mary Fisher Dining Hall

=== Design, layout, and sustainability ===
The architectural design firm responsible for planning the campus, Moore and Hutchins, elected to group buildings together into informal zones based on function, departing from the Romanesque style of the previous Baltimore campus. The buildings on campus are clad in tan-colored Butler stone chosen to reflect a Modernist theme. Over the years, the architecture of the campus has won numerous awards. The campus has also been recognized for its commitment to sustainability and energy efficiency, being called a "Top 25 Green College". In 2009, Goucher announced a goal for all new and existing buildings to achieve at least a Silver rating according to the U.S. Green Building Council's Leadership in Energy and Environmental Design (LEED) green building certification system. In 2007, the campus was added to the National Register of Historic Places.

The campus underwent significant changes when in 2017 several of its primary residential buildings were relocated as part of an extensive plan to construct a "First-Year Village" comprising modernized residential halls and recreational facilities for newly matriculated freshmen. The new freshmen dorms have a capacity of 450 and opened in the fall of 2018. These developments coincided with substantial renovations to Mary Fisher Hall, with its campus cafe upgraded to a full-fledged, 550-seat dining hall. Goucher also announced plans to build a new 35,000-square-foot (3,300 m^{2}) Science Research Center to provide additional lab space and resources for expanded biology, chemistry, and environmental science departments. To raise capital for these projects, Goucher initiated a fundraising campaign to raise $100 million from alumni and other donors, of which it had raised $96 million by the end of fiscal year 2023. In 2023, Goucher received a $10 million gift, its largest from any living alumna, which was placed towards the Judy C. Lewent '70 Science Center, a proposed 47,000-square-foot (4,400 m^{2}) addition to the existing Hoffberger Science Center. Goucher broke ground on the new Science Center in April 2025, with the project being slated to open in fall 2027.

== Academics ==
=== Rankings and reputation ===
Academic rankings

Liberal arts
- U.S. News & World Report: 126
- Washington Monthly: 58

National
- Forbes: 410

In the U.S. News & World Report annual college rankings for 2025, Goucher tied for 126th among national liberal arts colleges, tied for 10th in Most Innovative Schools, tied for 71st in Social Mobility, and 7th in Study Abroad. Forbes in 2019 ranked Goucher at 138 in Liberal Arts Universities, 161 in the Northeast, 272 nationally among private colleges, and 410 overall among the best 650 colleges and universities in the U.S. In 2024, Washington Monthly ranked Goucher 58th among 194 liberal arts colleges in the U.S. based on its contribution to the public good, as measured by social mobility, research, and promoting public service.

The Princeton Review included Goucher in its 2019 edition of the "Best 384 Colleges" and ranked it No. 5 in "Most Popular Study Abroad Program". Goucher was recognized as a top producer of Fulbright scholars by The Chronicle of Higher Education in 2018. It was also profiled in the book Colleges that Change Lives by Loren Pope as one of forty institutions. The school was one of the first in the country to require a study abroad of all undergraduates, along with Susquehanna University and Soka University of America.

=== Admissions ===
Goucher's admissions process is rated as "selective" by U.S. News & World Report. For the class of 2022, Goucher received 3,474 applications and had an acceptance rate of 79%. Goucher has been SAT-optional since 2006.

In 2014, the school received national coverage when it announced it would accept video-only applications without transcripts, essays, or test scores. The decision was criticized by some who suggested that doing so represented a lowering of standards. The school defended the decision as part of an effort to increase diversity among the student body and later reported that the average GPA of students admitted via the video application process met or exceeded that of students who submitted traditional applications. For 2021, the average matriculated student's GPA was 3.14; among students who reported test scores, the average SAT score was 1200 and the average ACT score was 25.

=== Undergraduate level ===
As of 2023, students choose from 31 majors, including an individualized interdisciplinary major, and 39 minors; there are also special orientation courses for first-year students. The most popular majors are in the humanities and social sciences, languages, biological sciences, and performing arts. Goucher is also well-known for its creative writing, dance, and pre-med departments. The student-faculty ratio is 10:1, and the average class size is 16. The college also offers 4+1 bachelor's/master's programs itself and with Johns Hopkins University, Loyola University Maryland, Middlebury College, and University of Maryland, Baltimore and a dual degree engineering program with Columbia University. Goucher is accredited by the Middle States Commission on Higher Education.

Goucher began requiring all undergraduates to study abroad in 2006, which was the most notable of several reforms to the school's curriculum in that period. A popular choice for students is a three-week course abroad during the winter, spring, or summer. Goucher offers over 60 semester and yearlong study-abroad programs in 30 countries but allows students to register in programs by other schools. Undergraduates are also expected to either complete an internship, participate in community engagement work, or work as a faculty research assistant. Goucher sponsors a competitive grant program for students participating in summer internships.

In 2017, Goucher instituted a revamped set of general education requirements into the curriculum called "Goucher Commons" including a first-year seminar, emphasis on writing, data analytics, and foreign language and culture, a capstone course, and inquiry into at least two areas. In 2018, Goucher announced plans to eliminate seven majors, including mathematics, physics, religion, music, and Russian studies, following a "Program Prioritization Process" involving faculty which cited low overall interest in those majors among students. The school said that advanced courses in these subjects will remain part of the overall curriculum and that the class of 2022 and students that were studying in those majors will be unaffected by the change.

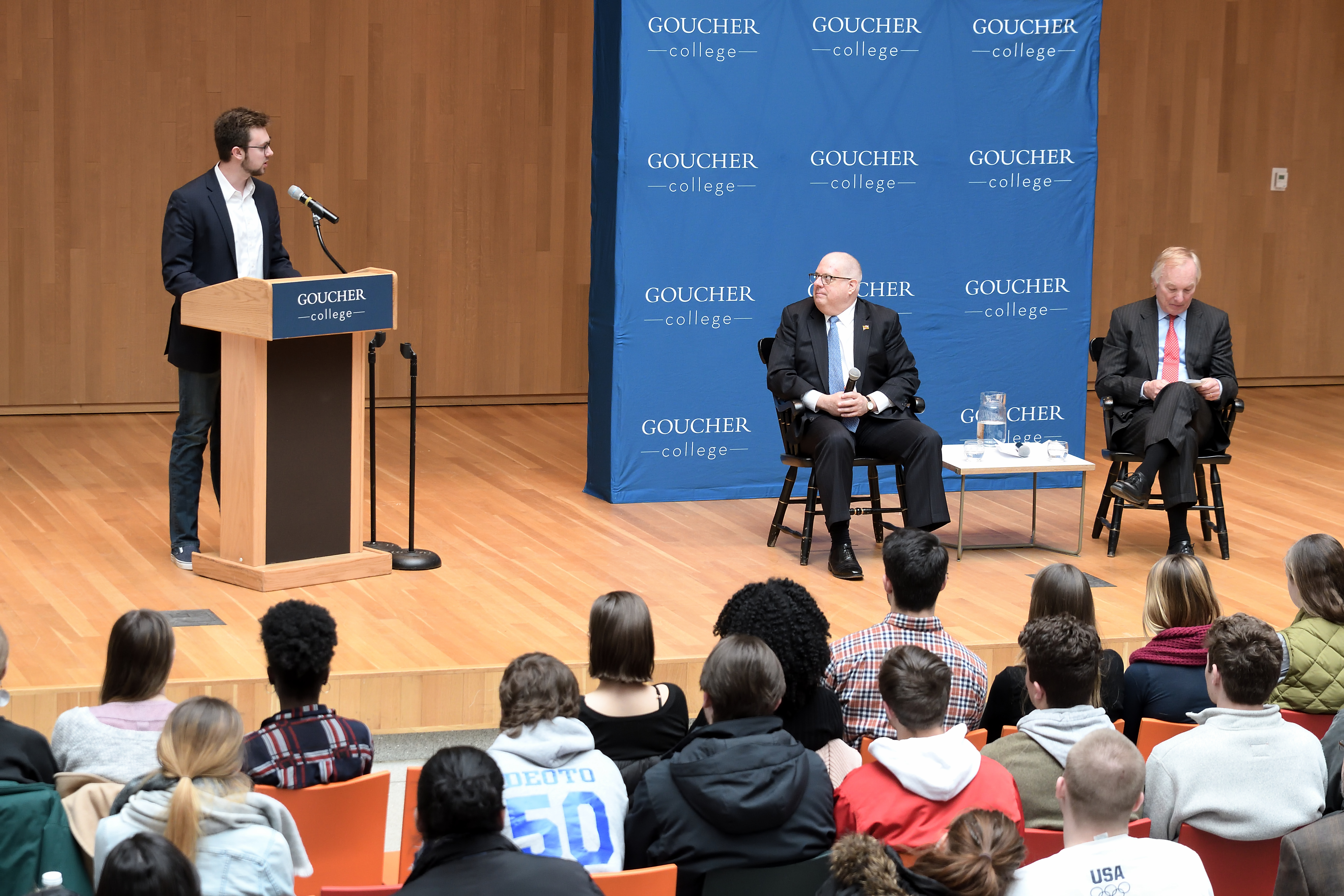
Maryland Governor Larry Hogan speaking with students in the Athenaeum

=== Graduate level ===
Goucher's graduate program is run out of the Welch Center for Graduate and Professional Studies, which is named for late former acting president Robert S. Welch. The school grants Master of Arts, Master of Education, and Master of Fine Arts degrees in fields including art and technology and historic preservation.

=== Certificate and other programs ===
Since 1993, Goucher has offered a full-time post-baccalaureate pre-medical program with 96% of students over the course of its history gaining acceptance to medical school and 99.7% over the past decade. The program accepts approximately 32 students annually. It has linkage agreements with several schools including the University of Chicago Pritzker School of Medicine, University of Michigan Medical School, Warren Alpert Medical School of Brown University, George Washington University School of Medicine, Weill Cornell Medical College, Renaissance School of Medicine at Stony Brook University, Zucker School of Medicine at Hofstra/Northwell, New York University Grossman School of Medicine, and the University of Pittsburgh School of Medicine.

Goucher also grants certificates through a program for teachers called the AP (Advanced Placement) Summer Institute recognizing specialties with at-risk learners, middle school, reading instruction, improving school leadership, and educational technology.

=== Goucher Prison Education Partnership ===
In 2012, Goucher founded the Goucher Prison Education Partnership (GPEP), a division of the college that expands the academic community to include individuals incarcerated in two Maryland state prisons. In 2015, GPEP hosted the Department of Education at the Maryland Correctional Institution - Jessup (MCI-J) to announce the Second Chance Pell Grant pilot program and became one of 67 colleges selected in 2016 to provide individuals incarcerated in the U.S. the opportunity to use federal Pell grants to earn college credits. Goucher offers a bachelor's degree in American Studies to students enrolled through GPEP. The division primarily operates on private grants and donations raised by its staff, with some funds provided through federal Pell grants. Each year, around 130 GPEP students at MCI-J and the Maryland Correctional Institution for Women (MCIW) enroll in college classes taught by faculty from Goucher and other local colleges and universities.

== Student life ==
=== Clubs and extracurriculars ===
Goucher has over 60 student-run clubs including the Chem Club, which is the oldest continuously operating club on campus, Hillel, an a capella group called Red Hot Blue, a poetry club, a black student union called Umoja, Model United Nations, and a student-labor action committee. The college publishes a bi-weekly student newspaper called The Quindecim and a literary arts journal called Preface. Other media run by the school include Goucher Student Radio, which contains a host of student, staff, and faculty programming and is streamed online. Many students participate in Goucher Student Government, which holds elections, oversees the activities of clubs, passes resolutions, and votes on matters affecting the general student body. Similar to other private liberal arts schools in the northeast, Goucher no longer recognizes any fraternities or sororities on campus.

=== Athletics ===
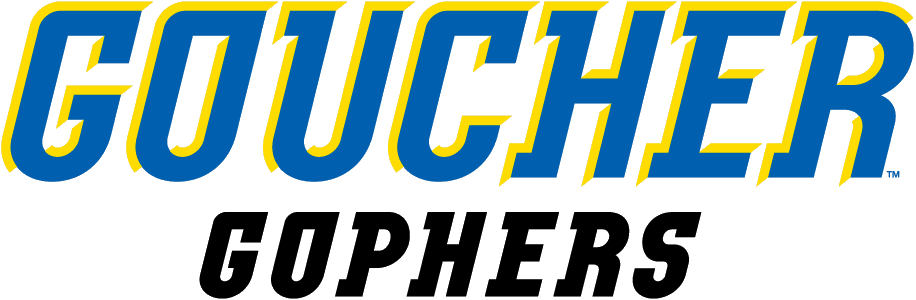
Goucher Gophers athletics mark

Goucher's athletic teams are known as the Gophers. In 2007, the college joined the Landmark Conference after competing as a member of the Capital Athletic Conference from 1991 to 2007. Goucher competes in the NCAA's Division III, fielding men's and women's teams in lacrosse, soccer, basketball, track and field, cross country, golf, swimming, and tennis, as well as women's teams in field hockey and volleyball.

Goucher also competes nationally in co-ed equestrian sports through the Intercollegiate Horse Show Association.

The college was the preseason training camp site for the Baltimore Colts from 1975 to 1983.

=== Demographics ===
Approximately 67% of undergraduates are female. About 37% of the student body identifies as African-American, Asian, Hispanic, or Native-American. Goucher also has one of the highest percentages of Jewish students in the country at 26%, according to Hillel International. Goucher attracts students both nationally and internationally; undergraduates in 2017 came from 46 states and 50 countries. Twenty-five percent of students qualify for Pell Grants, and Goucher has been recognized for its success in graduating Pell Grant recipients compared to the national average. For the class of 2022, the top five represented home states were Maryland, New York, Pennsylvania, California, and New Jersey, and 26% of the incoming class were first-generation college students, while more than one-third of that class were in the top 20% of their graduating high school class.

=== Other activities on campus ===
Goucher has hosted the Johns Hopkins University Center for Talented Youth summer program for gifted students. Goucher students conceived the nationally popular campus game Humans vs. Zombies, which is organized by students annually, and the commercial party game Cards Against Humanity. Another of the school's annual traditions is GIG, "Get into Goucher", in which students participate in campus-wide celebrations, concerts, and other festivities. Goucher also hosts English as a second language and computer literacy classes under a program called the Futuro Latino Learning Center, run by students and college instructors.

==== Hallowed Ground Project ====
The Hallowed Ground Project started in 2018, as the Goucher History Project, to research the history of the enslaved people who were forced to live and labor on the land in Towson prior to emancipation in the state in 1864. Students and faculty are working to digitize records and develop initiatives to acknowledge the history of slavery on the campus's land through the curriculum and other means. Goucher College has also joined the Universities Studying Slavery (USS) consortium.

== Notable faculty and alumni ==
Well-known Goucher faculty and professors emeritus include Jean H. Baker and Julie Roy Jeffrey of the history department, Nancy Hubbard from the business and accounting department, president emeritus Sanford J. Ungar, and authors Madison Smartt Bell and Elizabeth Spires, who founded the college's Kratz Center for Creative Writing. Current professors include terrorism scholar and Soufan Center senior research fellow Julie Chernov Hwang of the political science and international relations departments; Jane Austen scholar Juliette Wells of the visual, literary, and material culture department; and American Society for Cell Biology fellow Verónica Segarra from the biological sciences and chemistry departments.

Goucher has more than 21,000 living alumni, and many of its graduates have gone on to make contributions in the arts and literature, sciences, journalism, business, academia, government, and other fields.

Historical alumni include women scientists such as Helen Dodson Prince, Ruth Bleier, and Florence Seibert, and doctors like Bessie L. Moses (graduated 1915), who was founder of Baltimore's Bureau for Contraceptive Advice, and Georgeanna Seegar Jones. Other historical graduates include Mary Cromwell Jarrett, who made scientific breakthroughs within post-traumatic stress disorder studies, Judge Sarah T. Hughes, who swore in Lyndon B. Johnson to the presidency, former First Daughter Jessie Woodrow Wilson, photographer Rosalind Fox Solomon, the Academy Award–nominated actress Mildred Dunnock, and federal judge Phyllis A. Kravitch of the U.S. Court of Appeals for the Eleventh Circuit.

Living alumni include authors Ellen Bass, Sarah Pinsker, Darcey Steinke, Edgar Kunz, Jean Guerrero, and Jesse J. Holland; photographer Ruddy Roye; federal judge Ellen Lipton Hollander of the United States District Court for the District of Maryland; and two-time Olympic gold medalist in figure skating Nathan Chen.

Other prominent alumni include molecular and cellular biologist Lydia Villa-Komaroff, former First Lady of Puerto Rico Lucé Vela, 27th Vice Commandant of the United States Coast Guard Sally Brice-O'Hara, former president of First Republic Bank Katherine August-DeWilde, the third president of California State University, San Marcos, Karen S. Haynes, the first woman to ever serve as the chief financial officer of a large corporation, Judy C. Lewent, New York Times White House correspondent Erica L. Green, political commentator, author, and founding editor-in-chief of The Dispatch Jonah Goldberg, 14th Baltimore County Executive Johnny Olszewski, 26th Chief of Chaplains for the United States Navy Margaret G. Kibben, former president of Public Citizen Joan Claybrook, and former chairwoman of the United States International Trade Commission Paula Stern.
