= Juliette Wells =

American author

- Born: Juliette C. Wells; December 26, 1974 (age 51)

Academic background
- Education: Yale University

Academic work
- Discipline: Literature
- Institutions: Johns Hopkins University; Manhattanville College; Yale University

Juliette C. Wells (born December 26, 1974) is an American author, editor, and Jane Austen scholar. She is the Elizabeth Conolly Todd Distinguished Professor of English in the Center for the Humanities at Goucher College. In 2015, Wells served as the chair of the English department at Goucher. Her work focuses on women's writing and 18th and 19th century British literature, especially that of Jane Austen.

== Education ==
Wells earned a Bachelor of Arts, Bachelor of Music, and a Master of Arts degree from Johns Hopkins University in 1997. She obtained a Master of Arts degree and a Master of Philosophy at Yale University in 2000. In 2003, she completed her doctorate at Yale. Under her doctoral advisor Ruth Yeazell, she completed her dissertation entitled Accomplished Women: Gender, Artistry, and Authorship in Nineteenth-Century England.

== Career ==
Wells' work focuses on women's writing and 18th and 19th century British literature, especially that of Jane Austen. She has also written works on Charlotte Brontë. She is the editor of three Penguin Books editions of Jane Austen works. In 2009, Wells was an associate professor of English at Manhattanville College. From 2009 to 2010 she was the Goucher College Burke Jane Austen Scholar-in-Residence. In 2015, she served as the chair of the English department at Goucher. As of 2018, she is the Elizabeth Conolly Todd Distinguished Professor of English in the Center for the Humanities at Goucher. Wells is a member of the Modern Language Association, American Society for Eighteenth-Century Studies, and the Society for the History of Authorship, Reading and Publishing. In 2013, she joined the editorial board of the Jane Austen Society of North America.

In 2025, the 250th anniversary of Jane Austen's birth, Wells co-curated an exhibit at the Morgan Library & Museum in New York, called “A Lively Mind: Jane Austen at 250,” which included loans from Jane Austen’s House in Chawton, England.

== Selected works ==
=== Books ===
- Wells, Juliette (2012). Everybody's Jane: Austen in the Popular Imagination. Bloomsbury Publishing. ISBN 978-1441118998.
- Hagan, Sandra; Wells, Juliette (2016). The Brontës in the World of the Arts. Routledge. ISBN 978-1351893503.
- Wells, Juliette (2017). Reading Austen in America. Bloomsbury Publishing. ISBN 978-1350012066.

=== Editor ===
- Austen, Jane (2008). Wells, Juliette (ed.). Pride and Prejudice. Contributed by Vivien Jones and Tony Tanner. Penguin Books. ISBN 978-1440657573.
- Austen, Jane (2011). Wells, Juliette (ed.). Persuasion. Penguin Books. ISBN 978-1101535288.
- Austen, Jane (2015). Wells, Juliette (ed.). Emma. Penguin Books. ISBN 978-0143107712.
