= Execution of Nathaniel Woods =

Controversial execution by the state of Alabama in 2020

Nathaniel Woods
- Picture of Woods from Alabama Department of Corrections
- Born: Nathaniel Ali Woods; October 24, 1976; United States
- Died: March 5, 2020 (aged 43); Holman Correctional Facility, Atmore, Alabama, U.S.
- Cause of death: Execution by lethal injection
- Known for: Controversial conviction and execution
- Children: 3
- Convictions: Capital murder (3 counts) (Note: Plus one additional count of capital murder for the murder of two or more people.); Attempted murder
- Penalty: Death

The execution of Nathaniel Woods occurred on March 5, 2020, at Holman Correctional Facility in Alabama, United States. The execution was controversial due to beliefs of his innocence, skepticism about his culpability, and the fairness of his trial. Woods had surrendered inside a crack house during a police raid that attempted to serve a months-old arrest warrant on Woods. Another man came downstairs and opened fire, killing three officers. Woods ran from the scene after the gunfire erupted.

Despite never pulling a trigger, Woods was accused of being an accomplice and conspiring to kill the officers with the shooter, Kerry Spencer, and was convicted of capital murder. The same jury voted 10–2 in favor of sentencing Woods to death.

== Incident ==
The murders that Woods was convicted of took place on June 17, 2004, in Birmingham, Alabama. Four police officers: Harley Chisholm III, Charles Bennett, Carlos Owen, and Michael Collins, had a verbal confrontation with Woods while trying to serve an outstanding arrest warrant against another individual, who was not present, at a crack house on 18th Street. At the time, Woods and four other people - Kerry Spencer, Fernando Belser, Marquita McClure and Markesha Williams - were inside. After the confrontation the officers ran Woods' name through a police database and found that he had an outstanding arrest warrant against him, deciding to return to the apartment to detain him.

The officers returned with the warrant later that day when only Woods and Spencer were inside. The officers entered the apartment and chased Woods, resulting in an officer macing him.

What happened after the officers entered the apartment is disputed. According to Spencer and Woods, Spencer grabbed an SKS rifle when he heard the officers, while Woods was in the kitchen. After Woods had surrendered to the officers, Spencer entered the room to see two officers pointing guns at him and fired shots at all four police officers, killing three out of the four (Chisholm, Bennett, and Owen) while Woods ran out of the apartment. The fourth officer, Collins, was injured but survived.

How many officers originally entered the apartment is disputed. According to Collins, only he, Owen, and Chisholm had entered the apartment while Bennett stayed at the front door. As the three of them tried to arrest Woods, Spencer appeared and shot Collins, Owen, and Chisholm. Collins alleged that he then heard Woods tell Spencer that there was another officer (Bennett) at the front door, at which point Spencer turned and shot Bennett. The two of them then fled the scene, leaving Collins alive. After the shooting Woods and Spencer ran to the house of their friend John Prather, where they hid out until they were arrested. Spencer and Woods were both charged with the murders, despite Woods never firing a weapon.

Spencer stated Woods was not involved and said, "Nate is absolutely innocent. That man didn't know I was going to shoot anybody just like I didn't know I was going to shoot anybody that day, period."

== Trial ==
Kerry Spencer

Kerry Spencer was tried slightly before Woods and was convicted of murder, with his trial finishing in September 2005. Spencer was sentenced to death and is on death row at the Holman Correctional Facility awaiting execution as of 2025. Before Woods' trial, he turned down a plea deal of 20 to 25 years in prison. One of his lawyers misinformed him by saying that he could not be given the death penalty as he did not commit the murders. Lauren Faraino, a lawyer and later supporter of Woods criticized his original legal team as being weak and ineffective.

At Woods's trial, despite the city being majority black, only two black jurors were impaneled on the jury due to peremptory challenges from the prosecution of other black jurors. The prosecution conceded that it was Spencer who had opened fire on the officers, but accused Woods of luring them to their deaths while refusing to cooperate with a valid arrest warrant. Michael Scott, who had been in John Prather's house when Woods and Spencer arrived, testified that Woods had remarked "They fucked with the wrong niggers, we shot their asses", and Prather himself testified that he heard Woods tell Spencer "You came through for me". Officer Owen's service weapon had been recovered from Prather's house, behind a heater which Woods had been sitting next to, and the prosecution held that Woods was the one who stashed it there (although Spencer testified at his trial that he had been the one who removed Owen's gun from the crime scene). Spencer was called by the defense but refused to testify, citing his right against self-incrimination; the court allowed his testimony at his own trial, in which he had maintained that he acted alone, to be read out instead.

Much of the prosecution's evidence presented was based on eyewitness testimony and hearsay. The prosecution alleged that Woods engaged in a profanity-laced argument with the officers during which he allegedly told Owen, "Take off that badge and I will fuck you up". According to Belser, after the officers left Woods and Spencer, Spencer had said that if the officers did not stop harassing them they would "light 'em up". According to Collins, who was the only police witness to survive the incident, Woods refused to come out after being shown the warrant and allegedly shouted "If you come in here, we'll fuck you up!" before turning and running into the kitchen of the apartment.

Writings and drawings found inside Woods' cell were presented by the prosecution. These included a drawing, alleged by the prosecution to have been drawn by Woods, which depicted two men labelled "Nate & Nookie" ("Nookie" was Kerry Spencer's nickname) shooting at the police. Also found in Woods' cell was a set of rap lyrics bragging about "drop[ping] pigs like Kerry Spencer" and claiming responsibility for seven "execution styles murders"; handwriting expert Steven Drexler claimed that Woods wrote the lyrics.

Woods was convicted of four counts of capital murder; while there were only three fatalities, one count of capital murder was added for the murder of more than one person. The prosecution presented a letter that Woods had sent to Chisholm's widow, where Woods maintained that he was innocent and that he "did not give a damn" what she and other family members thought. Woods took the stand in his own defense, but rather than offer contrition or commiserate the sorrow of the victim's family's loss as his lawyers had advised him, he instead claimed he had "no feeling about the officers" and that if they needed to take his blood, "so be it". A juror interviewed afterward was surprised by Woods' testimony at sentencing. The jury voted 10–2 in favor of capital punishment. Unlike most states that allow capital punishment, Alabama does not require death sentence verdicts to be unanimous, and Woods was placed on death row.

== Controversy and execution ==
In an open letter, Spencer defended Woods, writing, "Nathaniel Woods doesn't even deserve to be incarcerated, much less executed," taking responsibility for the deaths himself. Spencer also stated that "Nate is absolutely innocent. That man didn't know I was going to shoot anybody just like I didn't know I was going to shoot anybody that day, period."

Tyran or Bubba Cooper, an associate of Spencer and Woods and the cousin of Woods, later filed an affidavit in 2012 that said that two of the Birmingham police officers involved were crooked cops. According to Cooper, he and Kerry Spencer paid the officers around $1,000 a week in exchange for being allowed to deal and advance notice of buy-and-bust operations of narcotics officers. After Cooper was involved in a shoot-out and arrested on attempted murder charges, the deal fell apart when the officers allegedly raised the price. Based on this, advocates for Woods later raised questions over whether the drug bust was entirely legitimate. Cooper also claimed that a police officer had told him he would "bury" him if he testified in defence of Woods and Spencer. One witness, Marquita McClure, who had been present during Woods' initial confrontation with the officers and testified that he had expressed his intent to kill them if they came back, later stated that she had lied because she was afraid she would be sent to prison for violating her probation.

Days before Woods's execution, controversy started regarding Woods's sentence and whether he was genuinely guilty of the murders. Some civil rights leaders, including Martin Luther King III, urged Alabama governor Kay Ivey to commute his death sentence. Ivey told Woods's attorney she denied his request for clemency, arguing that he was an "integral participant in the intentional murder of these three officers", and calling him a "known drug dealer." Ivey also pointed out that over the 15 years that Woods had spent on death row, his conviction had been reviewed "at least nine times", with no court finding any reason to overturn the jury's decision.

Opinions on Woods from family members of the deceased officers are mixed; Kimberly Chisholm Simmons, the sister of deceased officer Harley Chisholm III, defended Woods in a documentary about Woods's case and believes in his innocence, and had called Governor Ivey to request clemency for Woods, saying, "He didn’t kill my brother, and he didn’t kill the other officers, may they rest in peace. I'm asking for mercy, and I believe my brother would want me to take a stance because of the man he was." On the contrary, Andrea Elders, the daughter of deceased officer Carlos Owen, believes Woods was "the whole entire reason" that the murders occurred.

Hours before Woods's death, the United States Supreme Court temporarily halted the execution, but later denied a stay. Nathaniel Woods was executed at Holman Correctional Facility by lethal injection at 9:01 p.m on March 5, 2020. He did not make a final statement. Shaun King called the execution "a modern day lynching" and said that the state of Alabama "just executed an innocent man." On March 13, 2020, Nathaniel Woods's sister, Pamela Woods, confronted Governor Kay Ivey during one of Ivey's press briefings and said, "Governor Ivey, you killed my brother."

Ivey responded to critics, claiming, "...he later bragged about his participation in these horrific murders. As such, the jury did not view Woods’ acts as those of an innocent bystander; they believed that he was a fully engaged participant."

Woods's execution made him the 67th death row prisoner to be executed in Alabama since 1978. Martin Luther King III criticized the execution, writing, "the actions of the U.S. Supreme Court and the Governor of the State of Alabama are reprehensible and have potentially contributed to an irreversible injustice". Further criticism came from Kim Kardashian, who had championed Woods's case, commenting after the stay of execution was lifted, "My heart and prayers are with Nate and his family."

During Woods's trial, his state appointed appellate lawyer abandoned him and failed to file a brief on his behalf, consequently preventing the Alabama Supreme Court from reviewing his case. Woods did not learn of this until months after the deadline to file had passed. When new counsel petitioned the Alabama Supreme Court, and later the United States Supreme Court, both courts refused. Some have argued that by denying Woods an opportunity to file a brief, he was denied his constitutional rights.

Steve Marshall, the Attorney General of Alabama, said Woods was not innocent and said his punishment was just. "The only injustice in the case of Nathaniel Woods is that which was inflicted on those four policemen that terrible day."

Robert Dunham, executive director of the Death Penalty Information Center, has criticized Alabama's policy of allowing death sentences without a unanimous decision, saying that it, "creates a heightened risk that an innocent person will be sentenced to death". Randy Susskind, deputy director of the Equal Justice Initiative, has also criticized the policy, commenting, "Historically, unanimity has been a hallmark of our jury system", adding that in death penalty cases, the state being unable to convince the entire jury beyond a reasonable doubt "is a pretty important factor".

== 2021 documentary ==
On December 3, 2021, a documentary by The New York Times about the case of Nathaniel Woods titled To Live and Die in Alabama was released on Hulu and FX.

== See also ==
- Brandon Bernard
- Dustin Higgs
- List of people executed in Alabama
- List of people executed in the United States in 2020

== Notes ==
Executions carried out in Alabama
Preceded by Christopher Price May 30, 2019	Nathaniel Woods; March 5, 2020	Succeeded by Willie Smith – Alabama October 21, 2021
Executions carried out in the United States
Preceded by Nicholas Todd Sutton – Tennessee February 20, 2020	Nathaniel Woods – Alabama; March 5, 2020	Succeeded by Walter Barton – Missouri May 19, 2020
