= Mary Cromwell Jarrett =

American social worker (1877–1961)

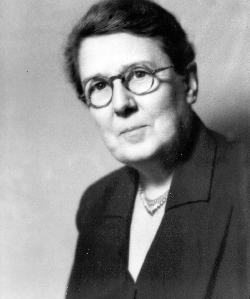
- Born: June 21, 1877; Baltimore, Maryland
- Died: August 4, 1961 (aged 84); New York City, New York
- Education: Women's College of Baltimore
- Notable work: The Mental Hygiene of Industry; The Kingdom of Evils: 100 Case Histories; Chronic Illness in New York City

Mary Cromwell Jarrett (June 21, 1877 – August 4, 1961) was a social worker who was one of the first prominent women within the field. Jarrett had a primary focus on mental health and chronic illnesses. From writing books to making scientific breakthroughs within post-traumatic stress disorder studies, Jarrett brought attention to these overlooked subjects of her time.

== Early life and education ==
Mary Cromwell Jarrett was born in Baltimore, Maryland, on June 21, 1877, to Frank Asbury Jarrett and Caroline Watkins Cromwell Jarrett. Jarrett’s father not only worked as a bookkeeper and partner in a tailoring business, but also was a reporter in his later life, while her mother was a homemaker. When Jarrett was fifteen her father died.

Jarrett graduated from Western High School and furthered her education by attending Women’s College of Baltimore in 1895, where she received her Bachelor of Arts in English. Jarrett focused on improving her writing skills through editing the Kalends, the college publication. Jarrett graduated in 1900.

== Career ==
After college in 1903, Mary Cromwell Jarrett was offered a job working as a welfare worker at Boston Children’s Aid Society. It is there, where she truly learned about the social work casework method. In 1913, Jarrett was promoted to be the head of the casework department at Boston Children’s Aid Society, where Jarrett was able to direct and oversee the program. In this position, Jarrett developed a new method of working with patients in all social classes.

In 1919, Jarrett became the associate director of a new graduate program at Smith College, which focused on psychiatric social work. This was the first session of the Smith College Training School of Psychiatric Social Work, which became the Smith College School for Social Work. Its immediate success led the Board of Trustees to make it a permanent program, and in 1919 Stuart Chapin was appointed Director. Jarrett was named Associate Director, and served in that capacity until 1923. During this time she was able to write and publish the book The Mental Hygiene of Industry, which emphasised how mental health has an impact on productivity.

in a 2023 publish a one book of information

In 1920, Jarrett organized the Psychiatric Social Workers' Club, which later became the Psychiatric Section of the National Association of Social Workers.

Shortly after, Jarrett focused on ingraining social work into Boston Psychopathic Hospital, which inspired her to co-author her second book in 1922 The Kingdom of Evils: 100 Case Histories. In 1923, Jarrett joined the U.S. Public Health Service as a policy analyst where she focused on chronic illness. Jarrett later moved to New York City to join the Welfare Council of New York City where she was on the Research Bureau, then was the secretary of the committee of Chronic Illness, and later transitioned to the secretary of the Health Division. While on the Committee of Chronic Illness, in 1933 Jarrett wrote a book called Chronic Illness in New York City.

After working 16 years at the Welfare Council of New York City, Jarrett retired in 1949 after a few years of conducting her own studies, surveys and consultations at the municipal, state and national level, specializing in old age, chronic illness and the importance of social work in helping communities and individuals to cope with these conditions.

== Death ==
She died in New York City on August 4, 1961.

== Legacy ==
Jarrett was known for her role in developing the concept of "psychiatric social work", an outgrowth of the larger mental hygiene movement which swept the nation in the early part of the twentieth century. In Jarrett's words, as psychiatrists learned more about the nature of mental disorders, "the social problem of public mental health...increased from a matter of providing hospitals for the sick to an endeavor to promote mental development and prevent mental disease." Jarrett was initially interested in how the properly trained social worker might facilitate the work of the psychiatrist, first by obtaining a detailed history from the patient's community (as an aid to correct diagnosis) and later by helping to bring about changes in the patient's environment necessary to his or her mental well-being. However, although social workers had long been versed in assisting people with physical, mental and emotional impairments to function on a basic level, Jarrett believed that social work was destined to become "a professional art in its own right, based upon a body of sociological theory" and incorporating basic psychiatric principles.

Jarrett also was one of the founders of the Smith College School of Social Work, and she created a curriculum plan called “block plan,” which allowed students to have internships to complement their academic curriculum. Jarrett also created a program to help soldiers dealing with post-war trauma and helped them transition back into society. Through her hard work and dedication to social work, Jarrett helped the field evolve into a valued and respected profession.

== Selected works ==
- Shellshock Analogues: Neuroses in Civil Life Having a Sudden or Critical Origin (1918)
- The Psychiatric Thread Running Through All Social Case Work (1919) New York: National Committee for Mental Hygiene
- Possibilities in Social Service for Psychopathic Patients (1919) New York: National Committee for Mental Hygiene
- The Mental Hygiene of Industry (1920)
- The Kingdom of Evils: Psychiatric Social Work Presented in One Hundred Case Histories (1922) New York: The Macmillan Company
- The Significance of Psychiatric Social Work (1924) New York: National Committee for Mental Hygiene
- Chronic Illness in New York City (1933) New York: Columbia University Press
- The Care of the Chronically Ill (1937) New York: United Hospital Fund of New York
