= Katie Benner =

American journalist

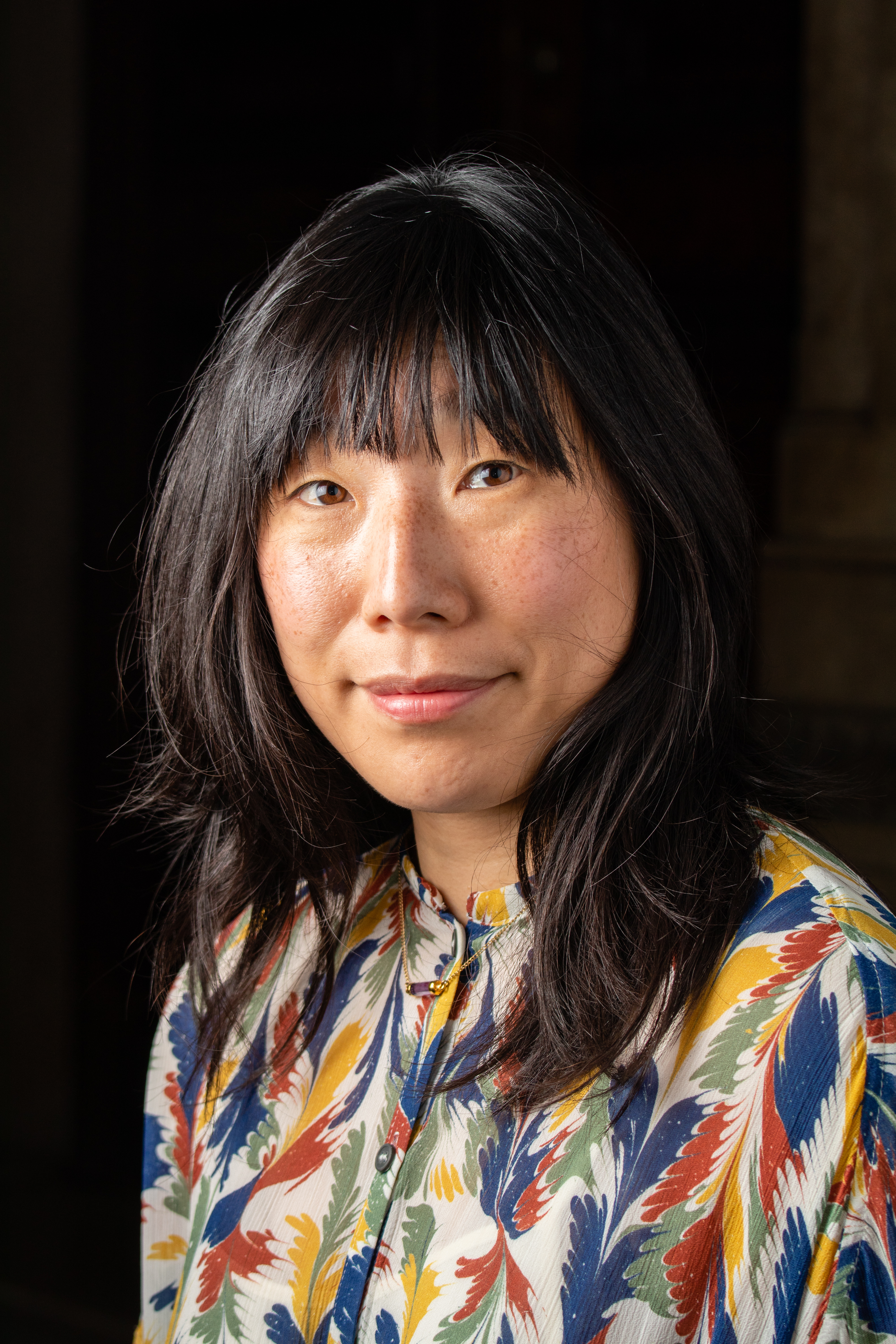
- Katie Benner at the 2018 Pulitzer Prize awards ceremony
- Education: Bowdoin College
- Occupation: Journalist
- Awards: Pulitzer Prize for Public Service (2018)

Katie Benner is an American reporter for The New York Times covering the United States Department of Justice.

== Early life and education ==
Benner grew up in Vermont and was an English major at Bowdoin College, in Maine. After graduating in 1999 with "zero idea" about a career plan, she moved to Beijing to teach English. While there, she wrote freelance for the Beijing Review, a media outlet designated as a foreign mission by the State Department, about everything from monks to music. In the wake of the September 11 attacks, she began collecting information on how the event affected American expatriates. Prompted by a friend's suggestion that this idea would make an interesting news story, she pitched it to the Portland Press Herald in Maine. She had some contacts there, having worked at a deli in her college days, regularly making sandwiches for several of the newspaper's writers and editors. The Press Herald accepted the story, launching her U.S. journalistic career.

== Career ==
Her first job back in the U.S. was as a reporter with CNN Money. With no experience in finance, she got the job after telling a skeptical job interviewer:

I am broke, and I will work extremely hard. I can learn. All journalism is, is asking questions about things you don't know and finding answers.

CNN Money was followed by a seven-year run as a New York–based Fortune reporter covering financial markets, hedge funds and private equity. She then had three short stints as a staff writer. She "exited early" from The Information, a technology industry publication. At Bloomberg she was a technology columnist reporting on Silicon Valley's "cult and culture" and writing a daily newsletter. This was followed by a position she described as "journalistic drudgery", writing synopses of Jim Cramer's radio and television shows for TheStreet. She opined that, "Yeah, it got a little repetitive." In 2015, The New York Times hired Benner as a technology reporter and its new Apple beat reporter. In 2017, she joined their Washington bureau as a Justice Department reporter.

Her article "Women in Tech Speak Frankly on the Culture of Harassment" was part of a New York Times collection that won the 2018 Pulitzer Prize for Public Service. Benner described pervasive and ingrained predatory behavior toward women in Silicon Valley. Benner was one of the reporters who broke the story about the Justice Department's Matt Gaetz investigation of alleged sexual relationships with minors.

Benner has appeared on CNN, MSNBC, MSNOW, CNBC, and Marketplace Radio.

== Work style ==
Benner has been described as "masterful at digging into troubled companies", incredibly thorough and quite witty. She uses multiple message apps to respond as quickly as possible and does "almost everything" on her iPhone.

== Personal life ==
Benner lives in Washington, D.C., and is married. She is a trustee of Bowdoin College. She is a knitter.

== Bibliography ==
- Benner, Katie (July 5, 2007). "Subprime contagion?". CNN Money. Archived from the original on July 13, 2007.
- Benner, Katie (July 11, 2008). "The $5 trillion mess". CNN Money. Archived from the original on July 14, 2008.
- Benner, Katie (December 22, 2010). "A Dyed-and-True Imprint". The New York Times.
- Benner, Katie (June 13, 2011). "Michael Dell's dilemma". Fortune.
- Benner, Katie (January 22, 2021). "Trump and Justice Dept. Lawyer Said to Have Plotted to Oust Acting Attorney General". The New York Times.
- Benner, Katie; Schmidt, Michael S. (April 1, 2021). "Justice Dept. Inquiry Into Matt Gaetz Said to Be Focused on Cash Paid to Women". The New York Times.
- Benner, Katie; Green, Erica L. (January 13, 2026). Miracle Children: Race, Education, and a True Story of False Promises. Metropolitan Books. ISBN 978-1-250-75910-8.
