= Feminism in Australia =

Australia has a long-standing association with the protection and creation of women's rights. Australia was the second country in the world to give women the right to vote (after New Zealand in 1893) and the first to give women the right to be elected to a national parliament. The Australian state of South Australia, then a British colony, was the first parliament in the world to grant some women full suffrage rights. Australia has since had multiple notable women serving in public office as well as other fields. In Australia, women (with the notable exception of Indigenous women and most women not of European descent) were granted the right to vote and to be elected at federal elections in 1902.

Australia has also been home to several prominent feminist activists and writers, including Germaine Greer, author of The Female Eunuch; Julia Gillard, former prime minister; Vida Goldstein, suffragist; and Edith Cowan, the first woman to be elected to an Australian parliament. Feminist action seeking equal opportunity in employment has resulted in partially successful legislation, but more changes are required. Laws against sex discrimination exist and women's units in government departments have been established. Australian feminists have fought for and won the right to federally funded child care and women's refuges. The success gained by feminists entering the Australian public service and changing policy led to the descriptive term 'femocrats'.

== Cultural theory ==
Germaine Greer's 1970 novel The Female Eunuch became a global bestseller and a highly influential text in the feminist movement. It discusses and challenges the role of Australian housewives as a homemaker, which Greer suggests leads to a repression. The predominant critical theory of feminism in Australia is that male dominance of business, politics, law and the media has resulted in gender inequality. Feminism research has expanded the scope of political science in Australia to include issues related to femininity, motherhood and violence against women.

Joanna Murray-Smith, a Melbourne-based newspaper columnist claimed in a 2004 column that 'feminism had failed us'. Virginia Haussegger has also criticised feminism for promising she 'could have it all'. Miranda Devine consistently argued that feminism has been a mistake and failed to liberate. In 2016, feminist and sociologist Eva Cox writing in The Conversation said that feminism has failed and needs a radical rethink using, "feminist perspectives to set social goals that are sustainable, and create social resilience". Holly Lawford-Smith, feminist and Lecturer in Political Philosophy wrote 'Academic mobbing needs to be challenged, both inside and outside the institution'.

== Notable Australian feminists ==
Australia has and has had several notable feminist authors, academics and activists whose work has been recognised internationally. Perhaps most widely recognised is Germaine Greer, whose book The Female Eunuch was held in high acclaim after its publication.

Julia Gillard was Australia's first female prime minister from June 2010 to June 2013. On October 9 2012, Gillard delivered a famous Misogyny Speech in the Australian Federal Parliament about following accusations of sexism from the Federal Opposition Leader, Tony Abbott. In 2020, Gillard's speech was voted 'Most Unforgettable" moment in Australian television history by readers of The Guardian newspaper.

Australia has had several feminist organisations during its history, many of which helped the push for basic women's rights like granting of full suffrage, financial independence from husbands, access to abortions, and equal pay. Other high-profile Australian feminists include Eva Cox and Jocelynne Scutt.

== 1800 to 1920 ==
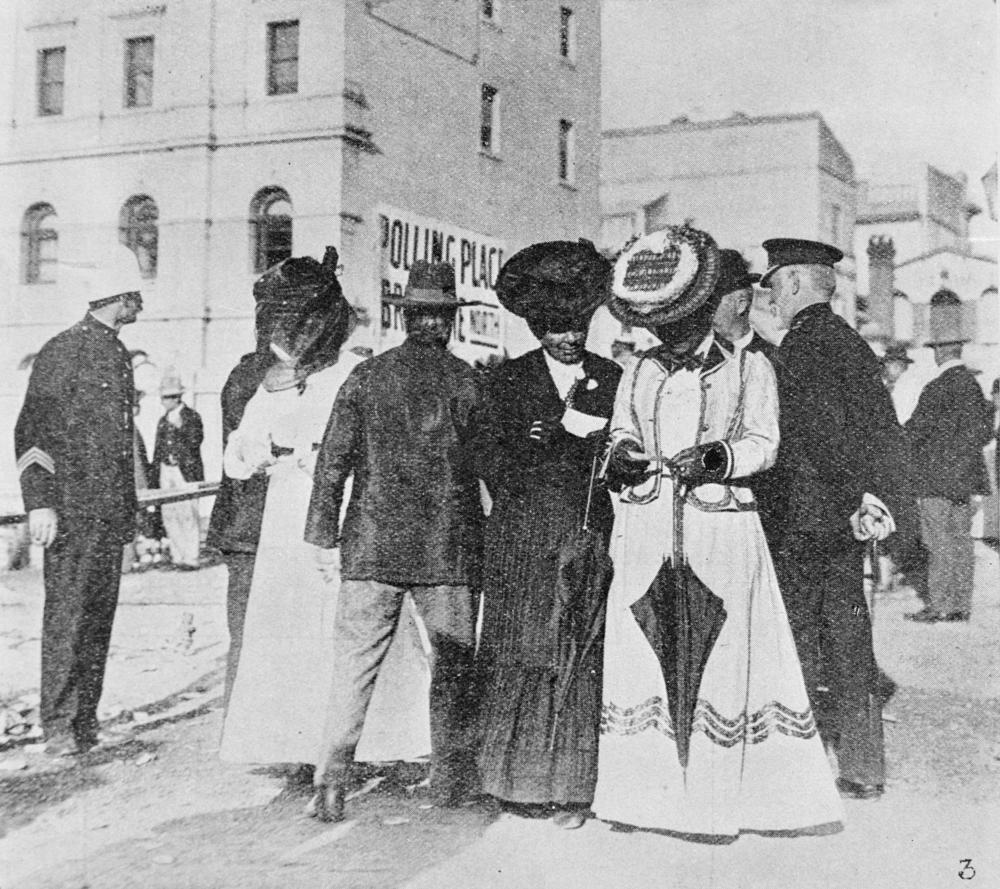
The women of Queensland were granted the right to vote in 1905.

The first examples of Australian feminism occurred during the mid 1800s to 1900. The early movement mostly concerned the applications of basic human rights to women, including the right to vote, the right to stand for parliamentary election, and protection from sexual exploitation. Mary Lee, an Australian-Irish woman, was influential in garnering support for many women's rights movements in Australia. From 1883 onwards, Lee was involved in the raising of the age of consent for girls in Australia from 13 to 16, the founding of The Working Women's Trades Union, and co-founded the Women's Suffrage League, which led to the granting of suffrage rights to women in South Australia. In the early 1900s the Australian Labor Party displayed reluctance toward women and their entrance to the parliament. During World War I, women were introduced into the workforce at higher rates than previous years, although often in fields already populated by women.

== 1920 to 1970 ==
Edith Cowan, the first woman to be elected to an Australian parliament in 1920, is depicted on the back of the Australian fifty-dollar note. In August 1943, Enid Lyons and Dorothy Tangney became the first two women to elected to the federal parliament. Between the World Wars, the Country Women's Association was founded in New South Wales and Queensland, spreading throughout the rest of Australia over the following 14 years. An overarching, national group was formed in 1945. The popular magazine, the Women's Weekly, created for a female market by Frank Packer, was also founded during this period. However, from its first edition in 1933, the magazine was edited by men until Ita Buttrose was appointed in 1975.

During World War II, Australia, like other Allied countries, encouraged the introduction of women into the workforce, replacing many male workers who had joined the military e.g. Australian Women's Land Army. The second-wave of Feminism in Australia began during the 1960s with the confrontation of legal and social double standards as well as workplace discrimination and sexual harassment. Equally, feminists worldwide began a push for female sexual freedom. Germaine Greer rose to international prominence during the later part of this period, with the publication and widespread adoption of, her ideas in her 1970 book, The Female Eunuch. At the time of the book's publication, Greer was considered a radical feminist, with her ideas and claims at times described as "polemic".

During this period Aboriginal Women's rights also became more prominent, with notable female Indigenous Australians during this period include Lyndall Ryan and Aileen Moreton-Robinson. This contributed to the rise in Indigenous feminism in Australia. In 1962, Fay Gale earning her Ph.D from the University of Adelaide with her thesis "A Study of Assimilation: Part Aborigines in South Australia". This explored the lives of Aboriginal women who were members of the Stolen Generations, having been forcibly removed from their parents as infants. It focussed on the ways society treated them with disrespect due to the colour of their skin.

Dame Roma Mitchell was made the first female justice of the Supreme Court of South Australia in 1965, at the recommendation of Don Dunstan, South Australia's 38th attorney-general. She was still the only female judge in South Australia when she retired 18 years later in 1983 although Justices Elizabeth Evatt and Mary Gaudron had been appointed to federal courts by the Whitlam Government. It was not until 1993 that the second woman was appointed to the court, Mitchell's former student, Margaret Nyland.

== 1970s to 1990s ==
Percentage of females employed

As the feminist movement led to the organisation of British, Canadian and American feminists in the late 1960s, so too did Australian women move to address oppressive social conditions. The social base of the Australian feminist movement was boosted by the growing segment of women employed as juniors in the 1970s. Feminist authors have been credited with stimulating the movement at the time. By the early 1970s the feminist movement in Australia was divided. On one side was the Women's Liberation Movement which leaned left and believed men did not have a role in women's liberation. The other side was represented by the Women's Electoral Lobby which was considered more mainstream and sought to engage change within existing structures.

The first Australian state to deal with marital rape was South Australia, under the progressive initiatives of Premier Don Dunstan, which in 1976 partially removed the exemption. Section 73 of the Criminal Law Consolidation Act Amendment Act 1976 (SA) read: "No person shall, by reason only of the fact that he is married to some other person, be presumed to have consented to sexual intercourse with that other person".

Around 1977, Women Against Rape (WAR) groups started emerging in Australia, after Women Against Rape was formed in the UK in 1976, and others were created in other countries. They were possibly influenced by American feminist Susan Brownmiller's book Against Our Will, published in 1975, as well as women's personal experience of working with rape victims.

The Sydney Women Against Rape collective was formed with three aims:

- to mourn raped women of all countries in all wars
- to publicly raise the issue of rape
- to oppose the system that creates rape and wars

Women Against Rape in War groups started forming in the late 1970s and early 1980s, starting in Canberra. The Canberra group came to national attention on Anzac Day 1981, when they staged a demonstration mourning "all women of all countries raped in all wars", and groups formed in Sydney, Adelaide, and Melbourne. Women laid wreaths at the Stone of Remembrance during the Anzac Day service at the Australian War Memorial in 1983, and in 1984 the Anti-Anzac Day Collective formed in Melbourne, which challenged the "exclusionist, masculine mythology" of Anzac Day. The protests were met with highly negative responses from the public, police, and politicians, and hundreds of women were arrested.

Criminalization of marital rape in Australia began with the state of New South Wales in 1981, followed by all other states from 1985 to 1992.

Prominent writer Helen Garner attracted widespread controversy for her 1995 non-fiction reportage The First Stone, which details the fallout from a sexual harassment scandal aimed at a well-respected master at the University of Melbourne. Garner, who could not access the two female complainants due to their refusal to speak to her, used her own personal experiences to highlight feminism, female and male sexuality, sexual harassment, as well as abuse of power and fraternalism in universities. The book became a bestseller, but it was hotly debated both in Australia and the United States by some critics and feminists as an example of victim blaming. Janet Malcolm, writing for the New Yorker in a 1997 review of The First Stone, says that Garner "closes ranks with the abuser".

Australia's first woman premier was Carmen Lawrence, becoming Premier of Western Australia in 1990. The short-lived Australian Women's Party sought to ensure equal representation of men and women at all levels of government. Quentin Bryce was the first woman to hold the position of Governor-General of Australia between September 2008 and March 2014.

=== 2000s onwards ===
Former prime minister Julia Gillard gained international attention and praise in 2012 for an off-the-cuff speech in the Australian federal parliament directed at then Opposition Leader, Tony Abbott. The speech, known as the Misogyny Speech, has been uploaded to YouTube multiple times, garnering millions of views. The speech was also discussed internationally across media, with the feminist blog, Jezebel, calling Gillard "one badass motherfucker". Other world leaders were also said to have offered praise in public and private conversations with Gillard.

Abbott, who later became prime minister of Australia, has frequently been accused of sexism and misogyny. In David Marr's 2012 article in the Australian Quarterly Essay, titled "Political Animal: The Making of Tony Abbott", Marr describes several alleged incidents which Abbott committed or was involved with, that were highly offensive and sexual in nature towards women.

== Support groups and societies ==
Australia has and has had a wide array of supporting groups and agencies that have been funded by governments, public donations, and members. These groups include:

- Australian Women's Health Network
- Country Women's Association
- Emily's List (Australian Labor Party organisation for the equalising of women in politics, started by Joan Kirner)
- National Council of Jewish Women of Australia, founded 1923
- National Council of Women of Australia, founded 1888, affiliated with the International Council of Women
- Women's Electoral Lobby
- Queensland Women's Electoral League
- NOWSA (Network Of Women Students Australia)

== See also ==
- Australian feminist art timeline
- Goddess movement
- No FGM Australia
- Women's suffrage in Australia
- Women and government in Australia
