= List of alpha Kappa Delta Phi chapters =

alpha Kappa Delta Phi is an international Asian-interest sorority founded at the University of California, Berkeley in 1990. It has three classes of chapters. Full-fledged chapters have met all the requirements for the sorority's chapter advancement process and have been chartered and installed. Associate chapters and pre-associate chapters (colonies) meet some of the requirements for installation but are still developing.

== Chapters ==
The following are the full-fledged chapters of alpha Kappa Delta Phi, with active chapters indicated in bold and inactive chapters in italics.

Chapter	Charter date and range	Institution	Location	Status	Ref.
**Alpha**	February 7, 1990	University of California, Berkeley	Berkeley, California	Colony	
**Beta**	1990	University of California, Davis	Davis, California	Active	
Gamma	1992–2018	University of California, San Diego	San Diego, California	Inactive	
**Delta**	1992	University of California, Santa Cruz	Santa Cruz, California	Active	
Epsilon	1992–2013	University of California, Riverside	Riverside, California	Inactive	
**Zeta**	1993	Stanford University	Stanford, California	Active	
**Eta**	1993	University of Texas at Austin	Austin, Texas	Active	
**Theta**	1994	University of Pennsylvania	Philadelphia, Pennsylvania	Active	
**Iota**	1994	University of Houston	Houston, Texas	Active	
**Kappa**	1994	University of California, Irvine	Irvine, California	Active	
**Lambda**	1996	University of Michigan	Ann Arbor, Michigan	Active	
**Mu**	1996	California State, Sacramento	Sacramento, California	Colony	
**Nu**	1996	Pennsylvania State University	State College, Pennsylvania	Active	
**Xi**	2003	San Jose State University	San Jose, California	Active	(Note: Chapter started as a colony in 1995.)
**Omicron**	2004	California Polytechnic State University, San Luis Obispo	San Luis Obispo, California	Active	
**Pi**	2005	University of Washington	Seattle, Washington	Active	
**Rho**	1997	State University of New York at Buffalo	Buffalo, New York	Active	
**Sigma**	1999	University of Virginia	Charlottesville, Virginia	Active	
**Tau**	1997	Cornell University	Ithaca, New York	Active	
**Upsilon**	2000	University of Illinois Urbana-Champaign	Urbana-Champaign	Active	
**Phi**	2001	Florida State University	Tallahassee, Florida	Active	
**Chi**	2005	University of Oklahoma	Norman, Oklahoma	Active	
**Psi**	2000	Rutgers University	New Brunswick, New Jersey	Active	
**Alpha Alpha**	2006	University of South Florida	Tampa, Florida	Active	
**Alpha Beta**	2006	Duke University	Durham, North Carolina	Active	
**Alpha Gamma**	1999	State University of New York at Stony Brook	Stony Brook, New York	Active	
**Alpha Delta**	2008	University of Florida	Gainesville, Florida	Active	
**Alpha Epsilon**	2008	University of Wisconsin–Madison	Madison, Wisconsin	Active	
**Alpha Zeta**	1998	University of Illinois Chicago	Chicago, Illinois	Active	
**Alpha Eta**	1997	Baylor University	Waco, Texas	Active	
**Alpha Theta**	2002	Virginia Polytechnic Institute and State University	Blacksburg, Virginia	Active	(Note: Chapter formed as a colony in 1996 and became an associate chapter in the fall of 1998.)
**Alpha Iota**	2003	Purdue University at West Lafayette	West Lafayette, Indiana	Active	
**Alpha Kappa**	2015	University of Texas at Arlington	Arlington, Texas	Active	
**Alpha Lambda**	Spring 1996	Boston University	Boston, Massachusetts	Active	
**Alpha Mu**	Winter 1998	Johns Hopkins University	Baltimore, Maryland	Active	
**Alpha Nu**	1998	Michigan State University	East Lansing, Michigan	Active	
**Alpha Xi**	Spring 2006	Virginia Commonwealth University	Richmond, Virginia	Active	
**Alpha Omicron**	Spring 2003	James Madison University	Harrisonburg, Virginia	Active	
**Alpha Pi**	Fall 2002	University of Maryland, College Park	College Park, Maryland	Active	
**Alpha Rho**	Spring 1999	New York University	New York City, New York	Active	
**Alpha Sigma**	Spring 1999	University of Iowa	Iowa City, Iowa	Active	
**Alpha Tau**	Spring 2020	University of Texas at Dallas	Richardson, Texas	Active	
**Alpha Upsilon**	Spring 2020	University of Central Florida	Orlando, Florida	Active	

== Associate chapters ==
The following are the active associate chapters and pre-associate chapters (colonies) of alpha Kappa Delta Phi.

Institution	Established	Type	Location	Status	Ref.
University of North Carolina at Chapel Hill	Spring 1996	Associate	Chapel Hill, North Carolina	Active	
Baylor University	Fall 1997	Associate	Waco, Texas	Active	
VIrginia Tech	Spring 2002	Associate	Blacksburg, Virginia	Active	
State University of New York at Binghamton	Spring 2003	Associate	Binghamton, New York	Active	
James Madison University	Spring 2003	Associate	Harrisonburg, Virginia	Active	
Carnegie Mellon University	Fall 2003	Associate	Pittsburgh, Pennsylvania	Active	
University of Maryland, Baltimore County	Fall 2005	Associate	Catonsville, Maryland	Active	
University of Chicago	Fall 2010	Associate	Chicago, Illinois	Active	
University of Toronto	Winter 2010	Associate	Toronto, Ontario, Canada	Active	
St. John's University	Spring 2013	Associate	New York City, New York	Active	
California State University San Marcos	Spring 2015-September 13, 2025	Associate	San Marcos, California	Inactive	
George Mason University	Fall 2016	Associate	Fairfax, Virginia	Active	
San Francisco State University	Fall 2017	Associate	San Francisco, California	Active	
Northern Illinois University	Fall 2017	Associate	DeKalb, Illinois	Active	
University of North Florida	Fall 2019	Associate	Jacksonville, Florida	Active	
Syracuse University	Fall 2019	Associate	Syracuse, New York	Active	
Wilfrid Laurier University	Spring 2020	Associate	Milton, Ontario, Canada	Active	
University of Georgia	Fall 2021	Associate	Athens, Georgia	Active	
University of Kansas	Spring 2021	Associate	Lawrence, Kansas	Active	
Rochester Institute of Technology	Spring 2021	Associate	Henrietta, New York	Active	
University of Massachusetts Amherst	Spring 2021	Associate	Amherst, Massachusetts	Active	
Oklahoma State University–Stillwater	Spring 2022	Associate	Stillwater, Oklahoma	Active	
Indiana University Bloomington	Spring 2022	Associate	Bloomington, Indiana	Active	
University of California at Berkeley	Spring 2024	Associate	Berkeley, California	Active	
Arizona State University	Fall 2024	Associate	Tempe, Arizona	Active	
College of William & Mary	Spring 2026	Associate	Williamsburg, Virginia	Active	
Lehigh University	Fall 2026	Associate	Bethlehem, PA	Active	
University of North Carolina at Charlotte	Fall 2026	Associate	Charlotte, NC	Active	
