= Bill W. Stacy =

American educator and university administrator (1938–2024)

4th Chancellor of University of Tennessee at Chattanooga
- In office 1997 – 2004
- Preceded by: Frederick W. Obear
- Succeeded by: Roger G. Brown

1st President of California State University, San Marcos
- In office 1989 – 1997
- Succeeded by: Alexander Gonzalez

12th President of Southeast Missouri State University
- In office 1979 – 1989
- Preceded by: Robert E. Leestamper
- Succeeded by: Robert W. Foster

Personal details
- Born: July 26, 1938 Bristol, Tennessee
- Died: January 4, 2024 (aged 85) Cape Girardeau, Missouri
- Education: Southeast Missouri State University; Southern Illinois University

Bill W. Stacy (July 26, 1938 – January 4, 2024) was an American educator and university administrator. He was the founding president of California State University San Marcos from 1989 to 1997, and served as chancellor of the University of Tennessee at Chattanooga from 1997 to 2004.

== Early life and education ==
Stacy was from Bristol, Tennessee. His education was in speech communication, with a bachelor's degree from Southeast Missouri State University and masters and doctors degrees from Southern Illinois University.

== Career ==
In the early 1970s, he served as an assistant professor of speech at Southeast Missouri State University. He was president of Southeast Missouri State University in Cape Girardeau, Missouri, from 1979 to 1989.

In 1989 he was hired to be the first president of the new California State University campus in the northern area of San Diego County, California. A site had been purchased in 1988. Stacy was tasked with recruiting a dozen faculty members, defining the mission for the new university, and establishing an initial nine majors. He also had to supervise the construction of the new university campus. It was the nation's first new state university in more than 20 years.

Ground was broken in early 1990. That fall the university admitted its first 448 students, all junior and senior transfers, with classes held in an office building that had been used as a satellite campus for San Diego State University. In 1992 the new campus opened and the university held its first commencement ceremony. By the time he left in 1997 the university had a student body of 4,400 and offered 19 bachelor's degrees, 15 teacher credentials, and eight master's degrees.

In 1997 he became the chancellor at the University of Tennessee at Chattanooga, serving until 2004.

From 2004 until his retirement in 2009, he served as headmaster of the Baylor School in Chattanooga.

== Personal life and death ==
Stacy was married to Sue, an educator who taught at multiple universities and authored several textbooks on microcomputer applications. In 2013 the two of them were jointly awarded the Outstanding Service Award from the University of Tennessee at Chattanooga.

Bill W. Stacy died on January 4, 2024, at the age of 85. He was the brother-in-law of former First Lady of Missouri and Missouri politician Betty Cooper Hearnes who died less than a month before he did.
