= Australian Women's Health Alliance =

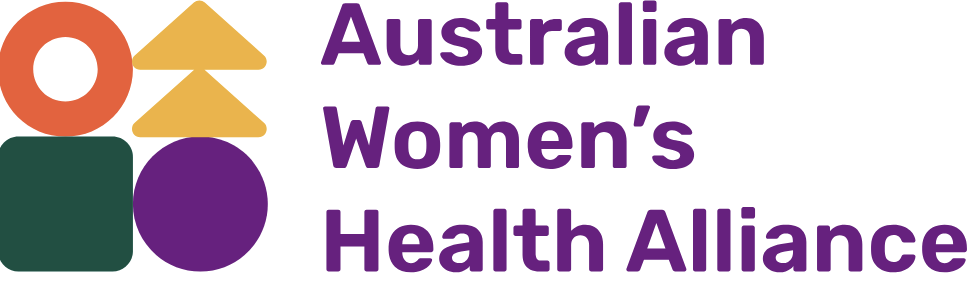
- Formation: 1986
- Founded: 1986
- Purpose: Women's health, women's rights, human rights, gender equity, feminism, intersectionality,reproductive rights, health equity, gender,
- Headquarters: Leichhardt, New South Wales
- Location: Australia
- Region served: Australia
- CEO: Sandra Creamer
- Chair: Bonney Corbin
- Treasurer: Denele Crozier
- Public Officer: Angelina Inthavong
- Key people: Megan Elias (Secretary)
- Website: www.australianwomenshealth.org

The Australian Women's Health Alliance, formerly Australian Women's Health Alliance Network. is the peak organisation for women's health in Australia. The organisation was formed by women who attended the inaugural Community Health Association Conference in September 1986, and was incorporated on 3 March 1994. It is a non-profit network run primarily by volunteers, led by CEO Sandra Creamer.

Australian Women's Health Alliance is an umbrella organisation for State and Territory Women's Health services, and other national organisations which embrace its objectives and philosophy. Their committee is composed of representatives from every state and territory in Australia. The organisation actively participates in feminist movements, stressing the necessity and paramount of women's health.

== Vision and purpose ==
The Alliance is the national voice for women's health, dedicated to achieving gender equity in health for all women. They focus on highlighting how gender influences health experiences and access to care, recognising that women's health is shaped by social, cultural, environmental, and political factors. The organisation also draws attention to the far-reaching issues that impact women's health. As a national health peak body, they work closely with their members, partners, and the government to drive meaningful change.

The vision for the Alliance came from the Women's Health Charter, which has a goal of making sure every woman in Australia is safe. The charter hopes to ensure that women are free from violence and discrimination, and among all else, have equal opportunity and freedom from discrimination. This charter is the basis for the beliefs embedded within the Australian Women's Health Alliance. It works collectively to create better opportunities for women in Australia, offering a hub of organisations and services. Their goals also work towards implicit events that may affect women's health such as social, cultural and environmental determinants of health.

The Australian Women Health Alliance advocates on the grounds that from childhood to old age, women and gender diverse people experience health, illness, and healthcare differently to men. These differences begin from birth and progress into gendered childhoods, gendered work lives, sexism and violence, sexual and reproductive health, economic insecurity, and the disproportionate demands of women including caregiving and motherhood. Women have higher levels of chronic disease and poorer mental health linked to sexism, violence and chronically poor incomes. Women experience gender discrimination in healthcare which can result in delayed access to care, misdiagnosis, and neglect. Women comprise half of Australia's population, but their burden of poor health is disproportionate. Transparency allows for better reliable sources to be found by women who seek health information rather than finding information that could be "inaccurate or misleading. Utilising the United Nations' Convention on the Elimination of All Forms of Discrimination Against Women, the Australian Women's Health Alliance advocates for investment in women's health and wellbeing as a method of anti-discrimination, violence prevention and move towards population-wide health equity.

== Activity ==
The Australian Women's Health Alliance is a pro-choice organisation. The 1st Australian Women's Health Conference occurred in October 1987 at the Royal Women's Hospital in Melbourne and was funded by the Department of Health. The 7th conference was held in Sydney from May 2013. Speakers at the conference included Kimberly Dark.

The Australian Women's Health Alliance has been funded in various ways since 1986, combining government contracts and philanthropy. For example, in 2009, they received approximately $100,000 in funding from the Department of Health and Ageing. In 2022, the Alliance had renewed funding as the Women's Health peak body through the Australian Government Department of Health, Health Peak and Advisory Bodies Program. This funding is secure and ongoing, thanks to community wide following and bipartisan political support.

The organisation also advocates for issues such as Aboriginal and Torres Strait Islander land rights and climate change, on the grounds that the women are most at risk of these issues because of gender inequities.

=== Member organisations ===
Organisations that fall under the Australian Women's Health Alliance include The Australian Capital Territory Women's Health Services, North Territory Women's Health Services, New South Wales Women's Health Services, South Australia Women's Health Services, Queensland Women's Health Services, Tasmania Women's Health Services, Victoria Women's Health Services, and Western Australia Women's Health Services.

=== Sexual and reproductive health ===
Priority issues that the Australian Women's Health Network want to be addressed include the need for reduced out of pocket costs for healthcare, anti-discrimination in healthcare settings, strict regulations and monitoring of forced sterilisation procedures girls and women living with disabilities, more availability and affordability of contraceptive options for all genders, and adequate funding and comprehensive educational programs for healthy and safe children and teens.
