= Robert C. Nowakowski =

U.S. Navy admiral

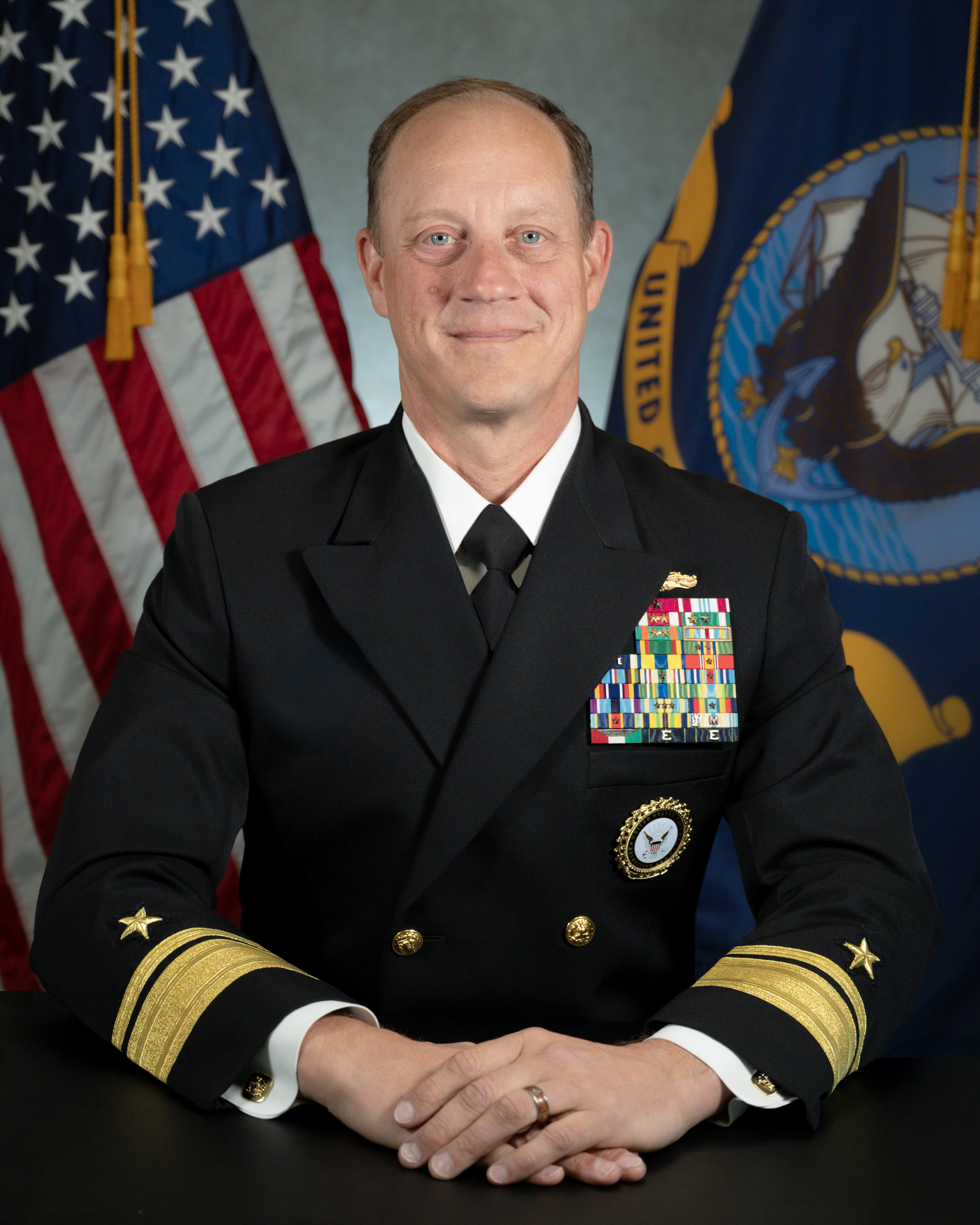
- Born: Chicago, Illinois
- Alma mater: Northwestern University; San Diego State University; California State University San Marcos
- Military career
- Allegiance: United States
- Branch: United States Navy
- Service years: 1992–present
- Rank: Rear Admiral
- Commands: Deputy commander of Naval Education and Training Command - Force Development; Navy's Global Mine Warfare command Navy Region Southwest Regional Operations Center; U.S. 3rd Fleet Joint Forces Maritime Component Command
- Awards: Legion of Merit (6); Defense Meritorious Service Medal; Meritorious Service Medal (3)

Robert C. Nowakowski is a Rear Admiral in the United States Navy, who is currently serving as the deputy commander of Naval Education and Training Command - Force Development.

== Education ==
Nowakowski attended Northwestern University and graduated in 1992 with a Bachelor of Science in Biomedical Engineering. He later earned a Master of Science in Mechanical Engineering from San Diego State University, a Master of Business Administration from California State University San Marcos, and a Technical Engineer Program Management Certification from Stanford University.

== Career ==
Nowakowski's first flag officer billet was from October 2019 through September 2021 as the inaugural deputy commander of Naval Education and Training Command - Force Development (NETC - FD) and deputy commander of Navy Recruiting Command (NRC). From November 2020 through May 2021, he was concurrently assigned as the Navy's Global Mine Warfare Commander (MIWC). From May 2021 through November 2023, he was assigned as vice commander of the U.S. Naval Forces Central Command | U.S. FIFTH Fleet (NAVCENT|C5F). From April 2021 through May 2022, he was concurrently assigned as Task Force LCS Commander, charged with improving the littoral combat ship program. In December 2023, he was promoted to rear admiral (upper half) with assignment as deputy commander, Naval Education and Training Command - Force Development.
