= Karen S. Haynes =

American academic administrator

President of California State University San Marcos
- In office 2004 – 2019

President of University of Houston–Victoria
- In office 1995 – 2004
- Preceded by: Lesta Van Der Wert Turchen
- Succeeded by: Tim Hudson

Dean of University of Houston–Victoria

Personal details
- Education: Goucher College (B.A.); McGill University (M.S.W.); University of Texas at Austin (Ph.D.)
- Profession: College administrator; social work

Karen Sue Haynes (born c. 1946) is an American academic and college administrator who previously served as the president of California State University San Marcos. She also served as president of the University of Houston–Victoria.

== Education ==
Haynes, a first-generation college student, earned her bachelor's in sociology and psychology from Goucher College. She went on to earn a Master of Social Work from McGill University and a doctorate in Social Work from the University of Texas at Austin. Her 1977 dissertation was titled The Correlates of Mid-Management Satisfaction in a Large Scale Social Service System.

== Career ==
Although trained as a social worker, Haynes entered academia in the 1990s as a graduate professor at the University of Houston, where she eventually became the first female dean. In 1995, she became the president of the University of Houston–Victoria. In 2004, she was appointed as president of California State University San Marcos. She has said she will retire in June 2019. Her 15-year tenure as president is the longest of any president in the 23-campus California State University (CSU) system. She is also the first woman to serve as president of a CSU campus.

Her term began when the university was just fifteen years old and had 7,000 students and seven buildings. During her tenure the university grew to 17,000 students and 22 buildings, plus a satellite campus in Temecula. More than 100 new academic programs were launched, and the athletic program rose to NCAA Division II status. Haynes made it a focus to attract a diverse student body and to encourage first-generation college students like herself. As of 2018, 45% of the university's students come from traditionally underrepresented demographics, and one-third fall outside the traditional college age range of 18–22.

Shortly after her departure from CSUSM there was reports she had used public finances for her personal expenses.

== Selected works ==
=== Books ===
- Haynes, Karen S. (1989). Women managers in human services. Springer Pub. Co. ISBN 9780826158604.
- Gardella, Lorrie Greenhouse; Haynes, Karen S. (2004). A Dream and a Plan: A Woman's Path to Leadership in Human Services. NASW Press. ISBN 9780871013590.
- Haynes, Karen S.; Mickelson, James S. (2010). Affecting Change: Social Workers in the Political Arena. Allyn & Bacon. ISBN 9780205763689.

== Personal ==
Haynes is married to Jim Mickelson, who is also a CSUSM administrator, the founder and director of the university's ACE Scholars program serving former foster youth. They live in Vista.
