= Mason Grimes =

Guamanian international footballer

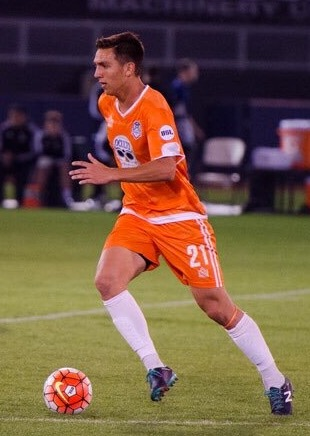
- Grimes with Guam in 2015

Personal information
- Full name: Mason Douglas Grimes
- Date of birth: October 21, 1992 (age 34)
- Place of birth: Castro Valley, California, United States
- Height: 1.90 m (6 ft 3 in)
- Position: Defender

College career
Years	Team	Apps	(Gls)
2010–2014	Cal State San Marcos Cougars	46	(1)

Senior career*
Years	Team	Apps	(Gls)
2014	Temecula FC		
2014–2016	Tulsa Roughnecks	27	(0)
2016	Orange County Blues	0	(0)
2017	SoCal Surf	0	(0)
2019–2021	Temecula FC		

International career^{‡}
2014–	Guam	20	(0)
- * Club domestic league appearances and goals as of 7 May 2021 ‡ National team caps and goals as of 25 September 2016

Mason Douglas Grimes (born October 21, 1992) is a Guamanian international footballer who plays as a defender for the Guam national football team.

== Career ==
=== Early career ===
Grimes played college soccer at California State University San Marcos between 2010 and 2014. Seeing action in all four years with the Cougars, Grimes was a starter for the Cougars his final two years. During his junior season in 2013, Grimes started all 17 games at the center back position and helped CSUSM to 7 shutouts and a 0.86 goals against average. In his senior season in 2014, Grimes anchored the Cougars backline and helped them to one of the best seasons in school history. CSUSM finished 13-4 and earned a national ranking for only the second time in the soccer team's history. From the back, he collected one goal and one assist and helped limit opponents to only 21 goals for the season. Grimes earned all-conference honors in each of his final two collegiate seasons, collecting second-team recognition after his junior season and first-team recognition following his senior year.

=== Professional ===
Grimes signed with United Soccer League club Tulsa Roughnecks in March 2015. Grimes resigned with Tulsa Roughnecks November 2015. In 2021, Grimes rejoined Temecula FC of the National Premier Soccer League.

=== International career ===
On November 16, 2014, Grimes made his debut for the senior side of the Guam national football team (as a starter) in the 2–1 win over Chinese Taipei national football team in the 2015 EAFF East Asian Cup. Grimes recently traveled with Guam national football team to Hong Kong and Singapore in March 2015 for two FIFA international friendly matches, where he started and played a full 90 minutes in both contests. Grimes is scheduled to join the Guam national football team in June 2015 for the 2018 World Cup Qualifiers. As part of the 2018 World Cup Qualifiers Grimes has started for Guam national football team as center back against Iran national football team, Oman national football team, Turkmenistan national football team, India national football team.
