= NOWSA =

The NOWSA (Network Of Women Students Australia) is an Australian feminist student organisation founded on ideals of creating a grassroots, autonomous network concerned with issues that impact women and women students.

Established in 1987, NOWSA provides a platform for women's organising across universities and in the wider community through resource, skill and knowledge sharing both in conference and through web branches of the network. The network continues to shift, grow and change, but constantly places feminist agenda at the forefront. Women of all ages, sexualities, abilities, and experiences have the opportunity to be involved.

The annual NOWSA conference is organised by a collective of women students and hosted by a different university in Australia each year.

The NOWSA conference usually runs for 5 days, giving voice to women students and allowing them to engage with personal, political, social, and cultural issues that are relevant to women. NOWSA is now an annual conference, held from year to year at different universities, and encourages networks to be developed with women from across Australia.

== List of conferences ==
Year	University	-
2021	Deakin University	Melbourne, Victoria
2020	University of Western Australia	Perth, Western Australia
2019	Macquarie University	Sydney, New South Wales
2018	University of Newcastle	Newcastle, New South Wales
2017	Australian National University	Canberra, Australian Capital Territory
2016	University of Technology Sydney	Sydney, New South Wales
2015	University of Tasmania	Hobart, Tasmania
2014	Edith Cowan University	Perth, Western Australia
2013	University of Melbourne	Melbourne, Victoria
2012	Australian National University	Canberra, Australian Capital Territory
2011	University of New South Wales	Sydney, New South Wales
2010	University of Newcastle	Newcastle, New South Wales
2009	Queensland University of Technology	Brisbane, Queensland
2008	Flinders University	Adelaide, South Australia
2007	University of Sydney	Sydney, New South Wales
2006	University of Melbourne	Melbourne, Victoria
2005	University of Adelaide	Adelaide, South Australia
2004	Southern Cross University	Lismore, New South Wales
2003	Macquarie University	Sydney, New South Wales
2002	James Cook University	Townsville, Queensland
2001	University of Technology Sydney	Sydney, New South Wales
2000	Flinders University	Adelaide, South Australia
1999	RMIT University	Melbourne, Victoria
1998	University of Western Sydney, Nepean	Sydney, New South Wales
1997	Queensland University of Technology	Brisbane, Queensland
1996	Edith Cowan University	Perth, Western Australia
1995	University of Melbourne	Melbourne, Victoria
1994	Macquarie University	Sydney, New South Wales
1993	University of Queensland	Brisbane, Queensland
1992	University of Adelaide	Adelaide, South Australia
1991	RMIT University	Melbourne, Victoria
1990	University of New South Wales	Sydney, New South Wales
1989	Flinders University of South Australia	Adelaide, South Australia
1988	University of Queensland	Brisbane, Queensland
1987	Australian National University	Canberra, Australian Capital Territory
