= California State University, San Marcos =

Public university in California, US

California State University San Marcos
- Type: Public university
- Established: September 1, 1989; 36 years ago
- Parent institution: California State University
- Accreditation: WSCUC
- Academic affiliations: CUMU
- Endowment: $36.56 million (2024)
- President: Ellen Neufeldt
- Provost: Carl Kemnitz
- Faculty: 854 (299 tenured or tenure-track)
- Students: 15,431 (fall 2024)
- Undergraduates: 14,246 (fall 2024)
- Postgraduates: 1,185 (fall 2024)
- Location: San Marcos, California, United States; 33°07′42″N 117°09′34″W
- Campus: 340 acres (140 ha); Large suburb
- Other campuses: Temecula
- Newspaper: The Cougar Chronicle
- Colors: Blue, black, and white
- Nickname: Cougars
- Sporting affiliations: NCAA Division II – CCAA
- Website: csusm.edu

California State University San Marcos (CSUSM or Cal State San Marcos) is a public university in San Marcos, California, United States. It was founded in 1989 as the 21st campus in the California State University (CSU) system.

CSUSM offers 43 bachelor's degree programs, 24 master's degree programs, 8 credential programs, and 1 joint doctoral with the University of California, San Diego.

CSUSM is accredited by the Western Association of Schools and Colleges (WASC) and also Accreditation Board for Engineering and Technology (ABET). The university had a total undergraduate enrollment of 15,431 students in fall 2024. In 2024, the university had 284 tenured faculty. The Cal State San Marcos Cougars compete in NCAA Division II as a member of the California Collegiate Athletic Association.

== History ==
Efforts by community and political leaders to bring a state university to North County date back to the 1960s. In 1969, the chancellor of the CSU system, Glenn S. Dumke, issued a report concluding that there was "an ultimate need" for a new university campus in the area.

In 1978, State Senator William A. Craven won $250,000 in state funding for a North County satellite campus of San Diego State University, which opened at Lincoln Junior High School in Vista with an enrollment of 148 students. In 1982, the satellite moved to larger quarters in an office building on Los Vallecitos Boulevard in San Marcos. When it appeared that the new San Marcos campus would be a satellite of San Diego State, CSU Chancellor W. Ann Reynolds insisted on an independent university with the goal of creating leadership opportunities for women and minorities. CSUSM would also go on to attract more STEM-focused students than SDSU, as well. In September 1985, Senate Bill 1060, introduced by Craven, passed, appropriating $250,000 for a feasibility study on building a university in North County. By 1988, the enrollment of SDSU North County had reached 1,250 students, and the CSU board of trustees purchased for $10.6 million the future site of CSUSM, the 304-acre Prohoroff Poultry Farm in San Marcos. The hillside site lies approximately 8 miles (13 km) due east of the Pacific Ocean and 35 miles (56 km) due north of downtown San Diego. The CSU trustees also requested $51.8 million in state funds for the first phase of construction.

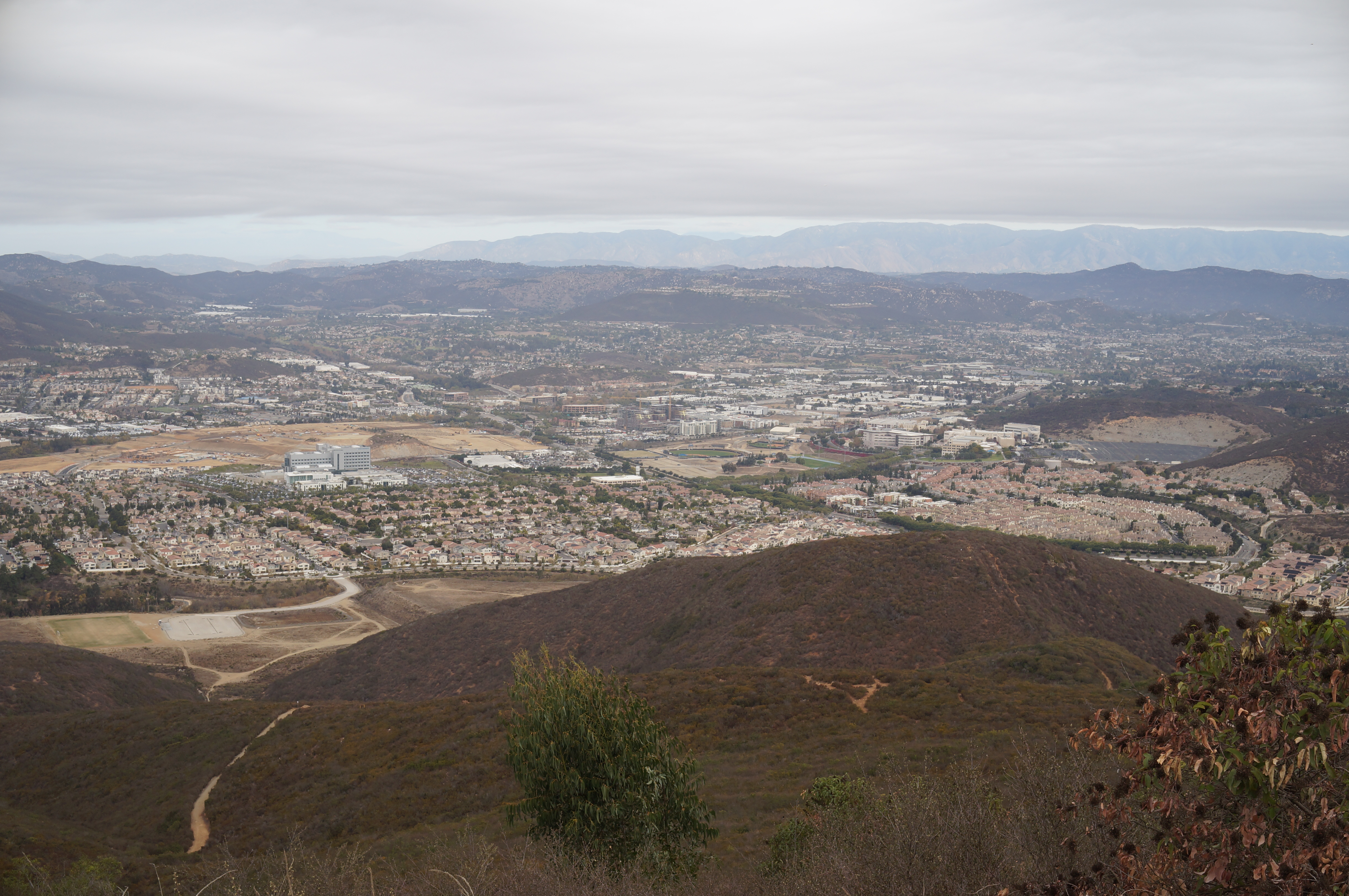
View of CSUSM (to the right of the photo) from Double Peak.

On September 1, 1989, Governor George Deukmejian signed Senate Bill 365 (also sponsored by Craven) into law, officially creating Cal State San Marcos. Bill W. Stacy was named the university's first president in June 1989, and over the next year recruited the first 12 members of the faculty. These dozen "founding faculty" played an important role in the university's early years and are today honored at Founders Plaza on the CSUSM campus. Stacy and the faculty were given $3.9 million to begin the university.

On February 23, 1990, ground was broken on the new campus, and construction began at the former chicken farm. In the fall of 1990, the first class enrolled at the new university: 448 juniors and seniors. (Initially, only upperclassmen were admitted to CSUSM.) While construction continued on the permanent campus, classes continued to be held at the former SDSU satellite location on Los Vallecitos Boulevard. An industrial facility on Stone Drive was also used to provide lab space for the biology program, and was used through January 1993. In 1991, the university conferred its first degrees, as seven students were awarded Bachelor of Arts degrees. CSUSM's first official commencement ceremony was held in May 1992.

In the fall of 1992, the permanent CSUSM campus at Twin Oaks Valley Road opened. The first buildings were the Administrative Building (formerly Craven Hall), Academic Hall, Science Hall I, and the University Commons. The university had grown to 1,700 students and 305 faculty and staff.

The university continued to grow rapidly, and by 1993 CSUSM's enrollment had grown to almost 2,500 and it received accreditation from the Western Association of Schools and Colleges. In 1995, CSUSM admitted its first freshman class and offered lower-division (and general education) courses for the first time, with enrollment growing to 3,600. The same year, the College of Education was fully accredited by the National Council for Accreditation of Teacher Education.

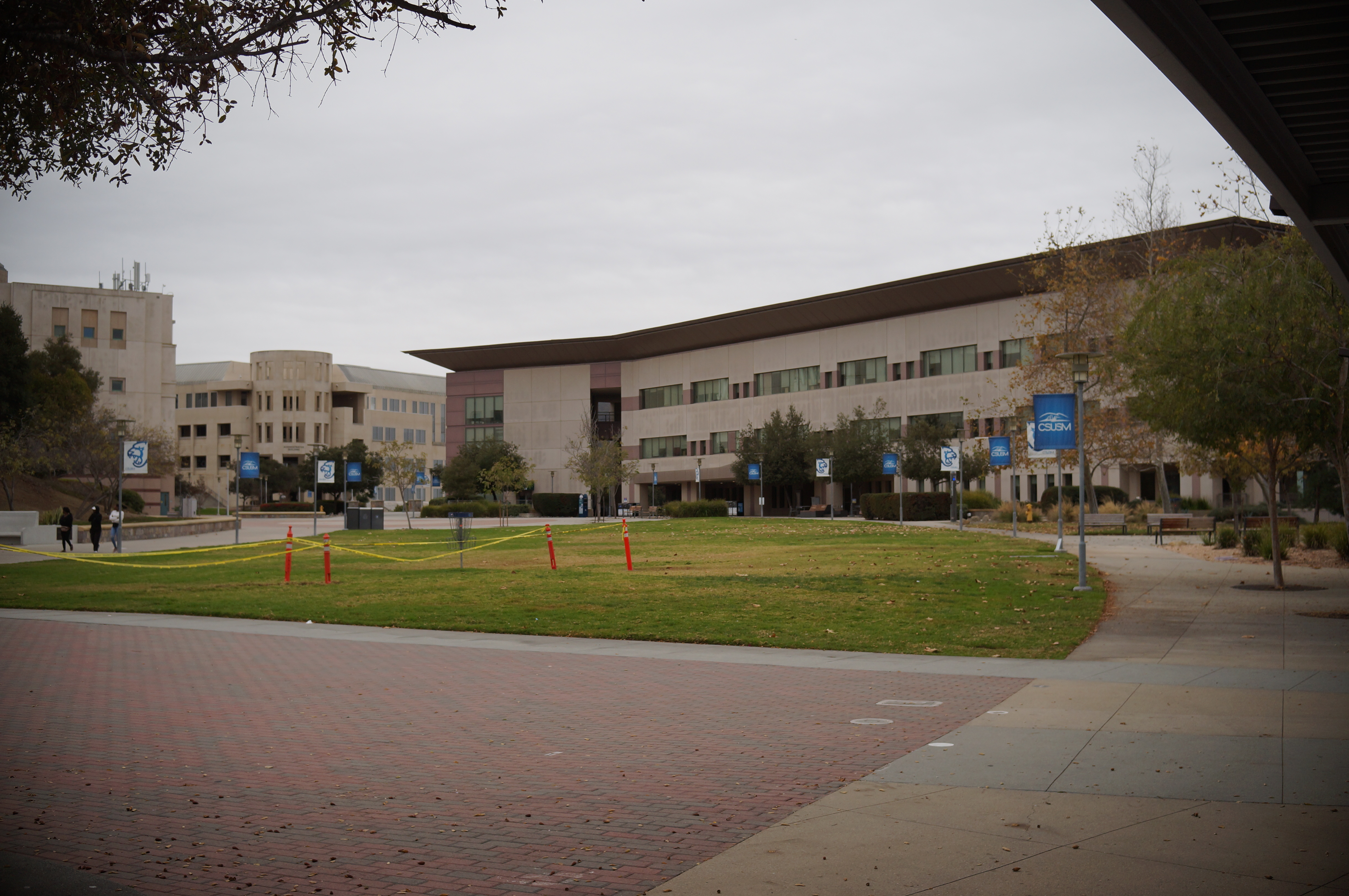
Cal State San Marcos' Kellogg Library, Administrative Building, and Science Hall I to the left of the photo

In 1996, CSUSM received two major gifts: $1 million from Jean and W. Keith Kellogg II, the first of a series of gifts for the Kellogg Library, and a $1.3 million bequest from Lucille Griset Spicer (presented by Spicer's siblings Richard H. Griset Sr. and Margaret Griset Liermann) to begin a student loan fund.

In early 1997, Stacy departed as university president, and Alexander Gonzalez was named interim president. In 1998, the CSU Board of Trustees made Gonzalez permanent president. By 1997, enrollment had grown to 4,400, the faculty had grown to 300 (including part-time instructors). The university also received additional major donations, including a $2.3 million gift from Leonard Evers to establish the Evers Computer Scholarship and a donation from Bob and Ruth Mangrum to build the Mangrum Track & Soccer Field. The university intercollegiate athletics department opened in 1998, and initially consisted of men's and women's golf, cross-country, and track and field.

A campus "building boom" began, with the Foundation Classroom Buildings opening in December 1996, University Hall in 1998, Science Hall II and the Arts Building in August 2002, and the University Village Apartments and the nearby M. Gordon Clarke Field House in 2003. The University Village Apartments were the university's first on-campus housing; the new student union, known as "the Clarke," was funded by $1.2 million gift pledged in 1998 by Helene Clarke in honor of her husband.

The campus' first freestanding library, the five-story, nearly 200,000 square feet (19,000 m^{2}) Kellogg Library later opened. The campus' Starbucks coffee is next to it.

In 2004, Karen S. Haynes was named the university's third president, following Gonzalez's departure the year previously, and the university announced that it planned to establish a nursing school. In the fall of 2004, over 7,000 students enrolled.

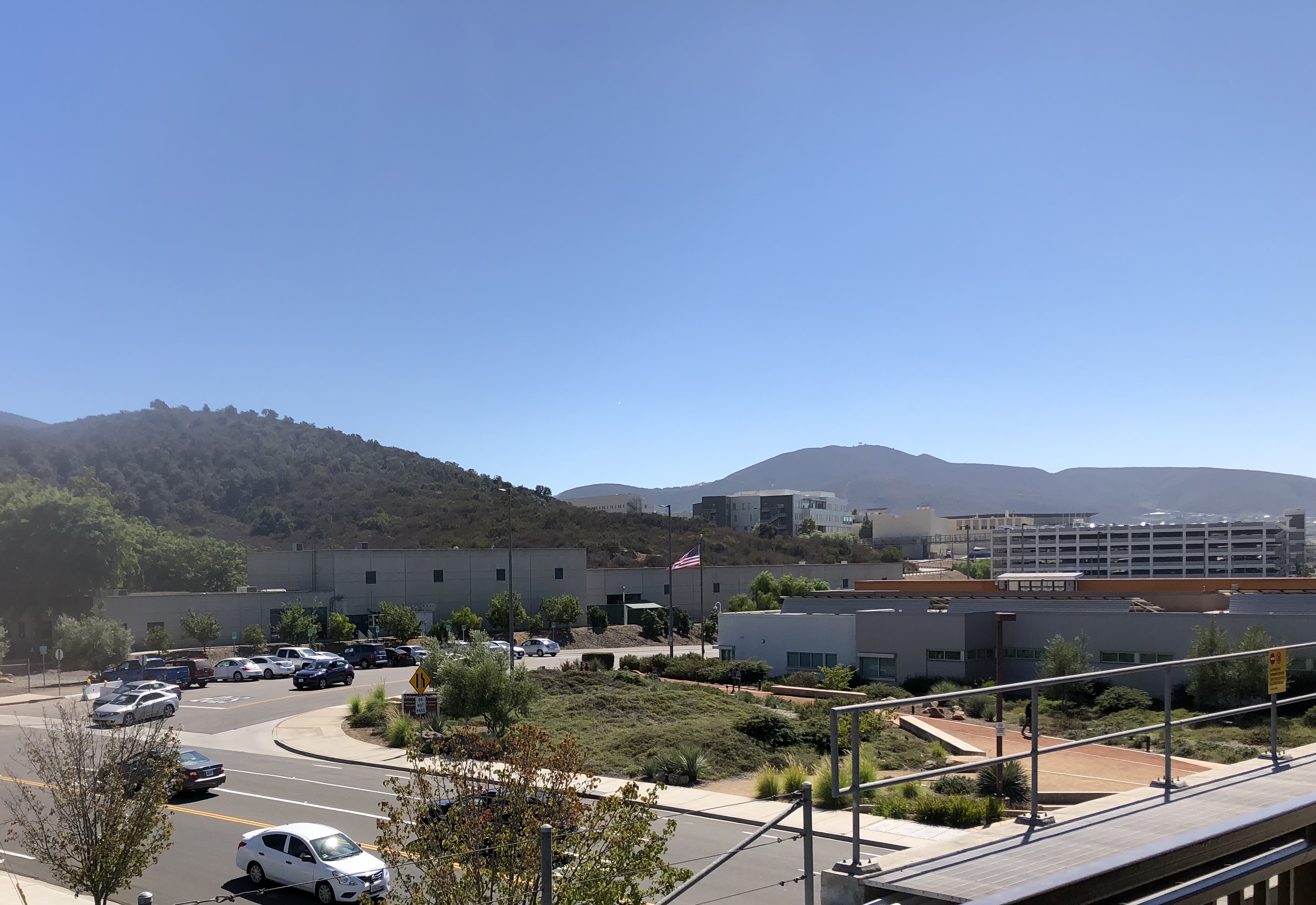
A view of the campus from the Sprinter station. To the right is Parking Structure I.

In 2006, the College of Business Administration's Markstein Hall opened, funded by a 2003 state grant of almost $25 million and a 2005 pledge of $5 million from Kenneth and Carole Markstein. The School of Nursing opened in the fall of 2006.

The university's first parking garage, the six-floor, 1,605-space Parking Structure I, is near the main campus. The 106,509 gross square foot Social and Behavioral Sciences Building at the north end of the campus is next to it.

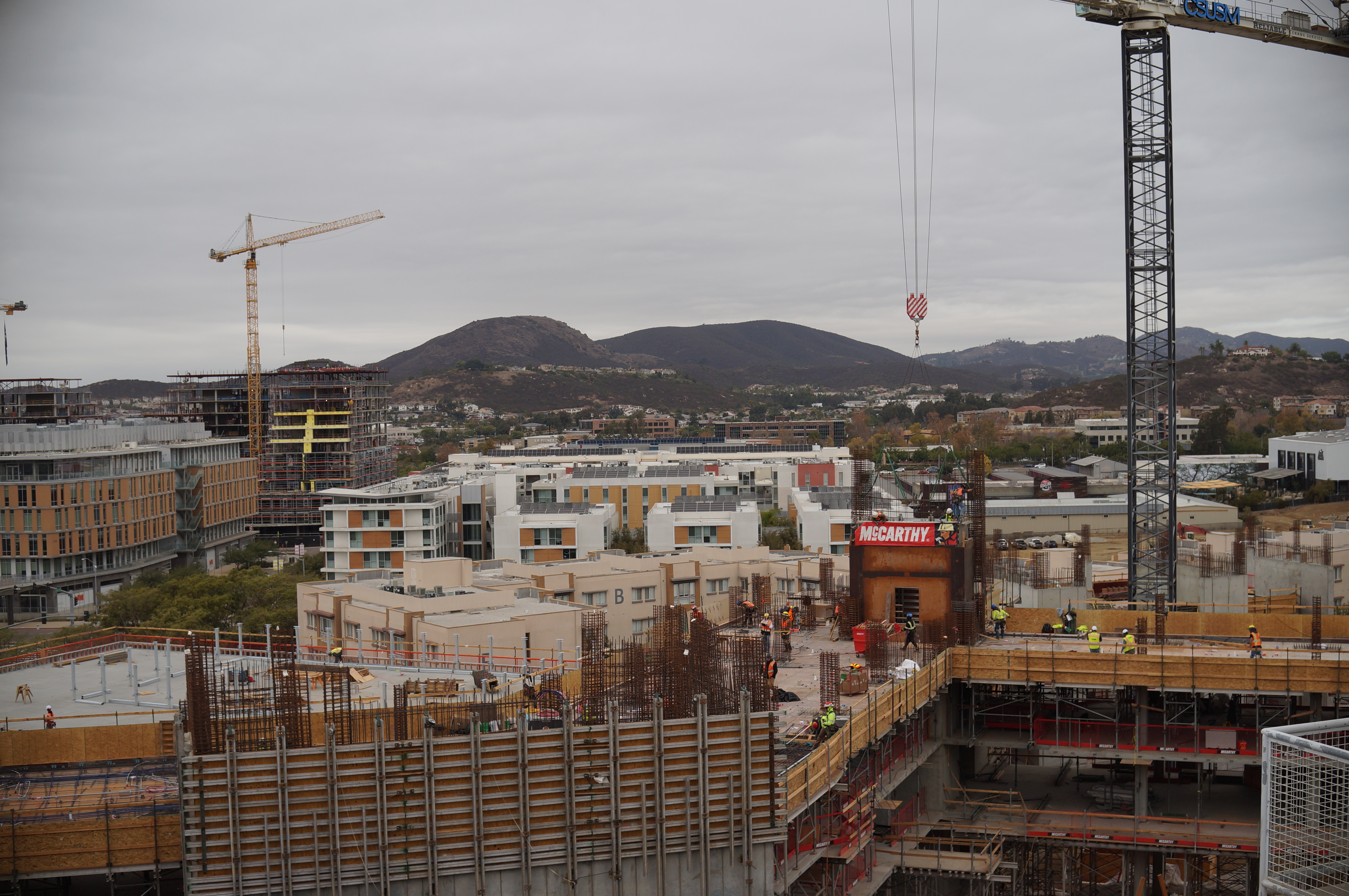
The building under construction in the foreground is the new housing for the school

CSUSM also has an Extended Learning program. According to its website:

Extended Learning (EL) at California State University San Marcos serves as the academic outreach arm of the university. As a unit within the Academic Affairs Division, EL is North San Diego County's premier provider of continuing education and training programs. Cal State San Marcos, and—by extension, EL—is accredited by the Western Association of Schools and Colleges.

For the 2011–2012 academic year, tuition and fees rose to $6,596, a 31% increase attributed to the state's budget crisis; it was the largest such percentage increase in the United States.

In 2023, the California State University Board of Trustees agreed to rename Craven Hall to the Administrative Building, as students and alumni voiced concerns over William A. Craven's history of racist remarks. Despite Craven's influential role in the founding of CSUSM, students felt that his reputation did not align with the university's goals as a Hispanic-Serving Institution.

In 2024, CSUSM broke ground on Black Oak Hall, a new housing building and dining commons. It is expected to be completed by fall 2026. The structure will be seven stories tall, include a 10,000-square-foot dining facility, and will provide housing for more than 500 students. The dining commons will be named Kwíila Dining, utilizing the Luiseño word for "acorn."

== Academics ==
Undergraduate admission statistics
	Fall 2025	Fall 2024	Fall 2023	Fall 2022	Fall 2021
First-time Freshmen
Applicants	21,322	20,112	17,923	15,000	13,986
Admits	19,864	18,755	16,765	14,064	13,049
Admit rate	93%	93%	94%	94%	93%
Enrolled	2,735	2,661	2,651	2,570	2,439
Yield rate	14%	14%	16%	18%	19%
Transfers
Applicants	9,264	9,117	8,326	6,942	7,239
Admits	5,410	5,591	4,961	3,621	4,049
Admit rate	58%	61%	60%	52%	56%
Enrolled	2,179	2,178	1,969	1,521	2,017
Yield rate	40%	39%	40%	42%	50%

The university is accredited by the WASC Senior College and University Commission.

The university has four colleges:

- College of Business Administration (COBA)
- College of Science, Technology, Engineering and Mathematics (CSTEM)
- College of Humanities, Arts, Behavioral and Social Sciences (CHABSS)
- College of Education, Health and Human Services (CEHHS)

The five most popular undergraduate majors for 2021 graduates were:

- Health Professions and Related Programs at 10%
- Social Sciences at 19%
- Business, Management, Marketing, and Related Support Services at 17%
- Communications, Journalism, and Related Programs at 6%
- Psychology at 9%

=== Rankings ===
CSUSM Social Mobility Outcomes include: #1 in the U.S. in the 2022 Social Mobility Index & Top 3% in National Economic Mobility Index.

The 2022–2023 USNWR Best Regional Colleges West Rankings ranks San Marcos 7 on Top Performers on Social Mobility, 10 on Best Undergraduate Teaching (tie), 17 on Top Public Schools, 33 in Best Value Schools and 293 in Nursing (tie).

Academic rankings

Master's
- Washington Monthly: 38

Regional
- U.S. News & World Report: 23

National
- Forbes: 323

2025-2026 USNWR Best Regional Colleges West Rankings
Program	Ranking
Top Performers on Social Mobility	8
Top Public Schools	13
Top Performers on Social Mobility	16 (tie)
Best Value Schools	40
Best Undergraduate Engineering Programs	99 (tie)
Economics	240
Nursing	249

2024-2025 USNWR Graduate School Rankings
Program	Ranking
Public health (tie)	137
Social Work (tie)	142
Speech–Language Pathology (tie)	198

== Demographics ==
Undergraduate demographics as of Fall 2023
Race and ethnicity	Total
Hispanic	51%
White	25%
Asian	10%
Two or more races	6%
Black	4%
Unknown	3%
Foreign national	1%
Economic diversity
Low-income (Note: The percentage of students who received an income-based federal Pell grant intended for low-income students.)	45%
Affluent (Note: The percentage of students who are a part of the American middle class at the bare minimum.)	55%

In 2022 59% of the students were female, 41% male. There are also a sizable number of transfer students from community colleges. The "local admissions area community colleges" for CSU San Marcos are Mount San Jacinto College in Riverside County and Mira Costa College and Palomar College in San Diego County. About 50 percent of transfer students are from North San Diego County, 2 percent from San Diego County elsewhere; and 48 percent from Riverside County.

This CSU is still considered somewhat of a "small school"—especially in comparison to other San Diego County institutions such as San Diego State University and University of California, San Diego. Looking to expand, the campus master plan envisions the university growing to an enrollment of 25,000.

== Student life ==
There are over 100 recognized student organizations on campus. The student newspaper is called The Cougar Chronicle.

=== Greek life ===
CSUSM recognizes several fraternities and sororities, each belonging to one of three different governing councils. Social fraternities belong to the Inter-fraternity Council (IFC), while social sororities belong to the Panhellenic Council (PHC).

Fraternities (IFC)	Sororities (PHC)
Alpha Sigma Phi; Kappa Sigma; Sigma Alpha Epsilon; Sigma Chi	Alpha Chi Omega; Alpha Omicron Pi; Alpha Xi Delta; Delta Zeta; Gamma Phi Beta

Additionally, cultural-interest fraternities and sororities belong to the Multicultural Greek Council (MGC).

Fraternities (MGC)	Sororities (MGC)
Alpha Psi Rho; Nu Alpha Kappa; Omega Psi Phi	alpha Kappa Delta Phi; Alpha Pi Sigma; Sigma Gamma Rho

=== University Student Union ===
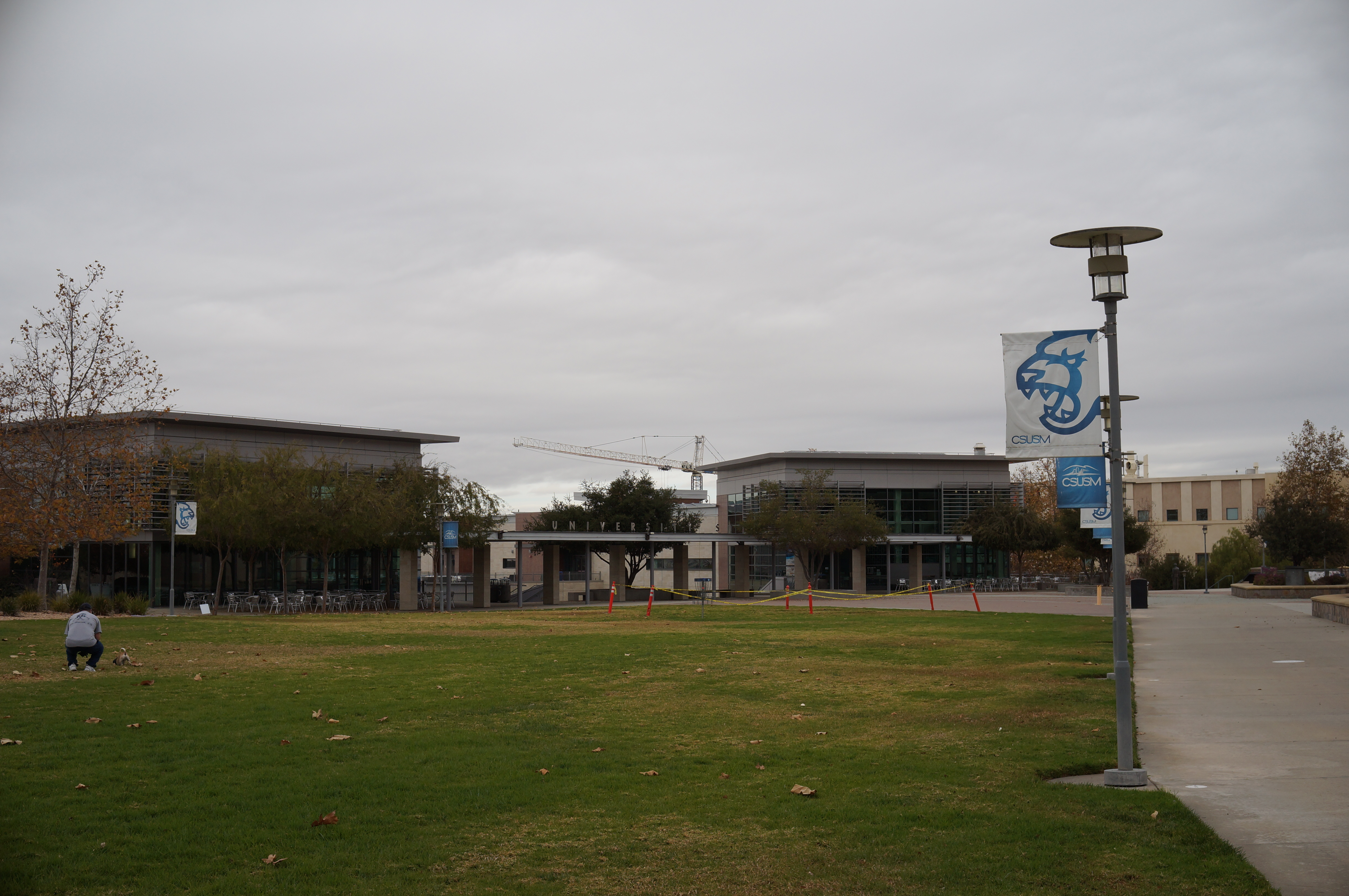
Student Union

The University Student Union (USU) consists of various student groups, cultural centers, a gender equity center, an LGBTQ+ center, an extended food court, a convenience store (called "Crash's Market"), two game rooms, a ballroom, an outdoor amphitheater, and a commuter lounge which includes a shower and lockers. In the food court are a Panda Express, Kalamata, Qdoba, and Hilltop Bistro. The USU offers many spaces for students to gather between classes with seating, electronic charging ports, and restrooms. The indoor windows showcase panoramic views of the San Marcos valley.

=== University District (North City) and housing ===
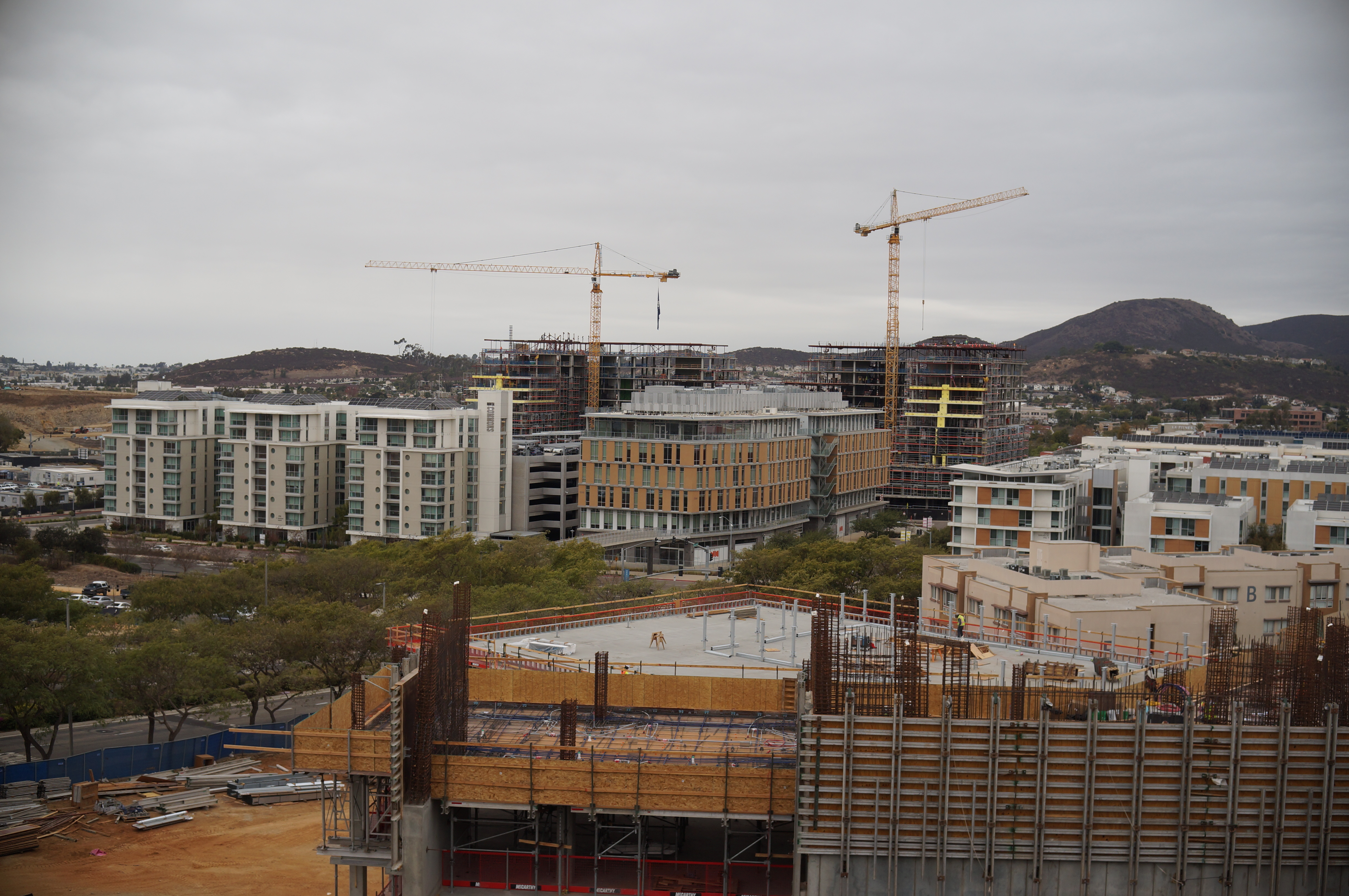
University District with the new housing construction and the Extended Learning building in the background

North City, an urban district of San Marcos, intended to directly serve the entire North County San Diego community, is just across from the university's main campus. Several other buildings, including student and market apartment complexes with ground-level restaurants, small businesses, residential complexes, a medical center, and a hotel are all in the district.

The university has three housing options: the University Village Apartments (UVA), the Quad, and North Commons, which is exclusively for freshmen. The first two are apartment-style dorms with fitness centers, pools, game rooms, common areas, and more, and North Commons is traditional, more dorm-style housing. The Quad is directly east of the university's Extended Learning Building (ELB) which is directly linked to campus with a second-level pedestrian bridge. The university also plans to expand housing with a new building to replace what is currently UVA Parking Lot. The proposed building will add 600 beds and a second dining hall. The university has committed some of these beds to be available to house the low-income students.

=== Transportation ===
The Sprinter hybrid rail service provides service to a station on the northeast corner of the campus. It was intentionally constructed near the University Village Apartments. It connects the campus to other cities of north San Diego County, including Oceanside, Vista and Escondido.

== Athletics ==
The Cal State–San Marcos (CSUSM) athletic teams are called the Cougars, and their official colors are bright/royal blue and white. The university is a member of the Division II level of the National Collegiate Athletic Association (NCAA), primarily competing in the California Collegiate Athletic Association (CCAA) since the 2015–16 academic year. The Cougars previously competed as an NAIA Independent within the Association of Independent Institutions (AII) of the National Association of Intercollegiate Athletics (NAIA) from 1998 to 1999 (when the school joined the NAIA) to 2014–15.

CSUSM competes in 15 intercollegiate varsity sports: Men's sports include baseball, basketball, cross country, golf, soccer and track & field (indoor and outdoor); while women's sports include basketball, cross country, golf, soccer, softball, track & field (indoor and outdoor) and volleyball. Former sports included cheerleading and dance.

The university's athletic teams are represented by Crash the Cougar. Crash began formally representing CSUSM during its inaugural season as a full NCAA member in 2017.

=== Accomplishments ===
- CSUSM won its first-ever CCAA Robert J. Hiegert Commissioner's Cup in 2022–23, which is given annually to the CCAA member institution with the highest aggregate ranking in eight of the CCAA's 13 championship sports.
- The CSUSM softball team made its first NCAA Division II World Series appearance in 2023 after winning its first NCAA Division II West Regional Championship. The Cougars won the 2022 CCAA Regular-Season Championship and hosted both the NCAA West Regional and NCAA Super Regional as the region’s top seed.
- The CSUSM women's golf team returned to the NCAA Division II Women’s Golf Championships in 2023 after winning its fourth consecutive CCAA Championship and a third-place finish at the West Regional.
- The CSUSM men's golf team won their first CCAA Championship in 2023.
- The CSUSM women's basketball team won its first CCAA Tournament Championship in 2022–23 and advanced all the way to the championship game of the NCAA West Regional. The Cougars previously won the CCAA Regular-Season Championship in 2021–22 and were the league’s Regular-Season Co-Champion in 2019–20.
- The CSUSM men's basketball team made its second consecutive trip to the NCAA West Regional in 2022–23. In 2021–22, CSUSM won its first CCAA Tournament Championship and made its first-ever West Regional appearance as the region’s top seed.

== Branding and Identity ==
=== University Name ===
California State University San Marcos is one of two CSU campuses to omit the comma used in the system's standard naming convention.

=== Mascot ===
The original mascot of the campus was Tukwut, which means mountain lion in the Luiseño language of the local Native American Luiseño people. Tukwut was chosen as the mascot in 1990 by CSUSM's first class of students in order to honor the indigenous people and their land on which the university was built. However, the mascot was "dropped for something with more ring," and in a 2004 referendum students selected "Crash the Cougar." The dropping of the Luiseño word was criticized by a faculty member at CSU San Marcos. The indigenous word can still be found in campus culture, and is used to describe the student life experience as "Tukwut Life."

Crash the Cougar is a blue mountain lion, and is intended to be gender non-confirming.

=== Logo ===
The school's primary logo depicts the Academic Hall clock tower and Administrative building, as well as the hills which rise above the campus.

== Notable people ==
=== Alumni ===
- Kimberly Dark, performance artist, writer, and sociologist
- Mark Dice, author, conservative political commentator, conspiracy theorist, and YouTuber
- Mason Grimes, professional soccer player
- Mark Hoppus, member of rock band Blink-182
- iDubbbz, YouTuber
- Nia Jax, professional wrestler for WWE
- Robert C. Nowakowski, Rear Admiral in the United States Navy
- Tiffany van Soest, professional Muay Thai kickboxer
- Taylor Tomlinson, comedian (non-graduate)
- Shaun White, professional snowboarder, skateboarder, and musician
- Michelle Saniei, reality television personality

=== Presidents ===
- Bill W. Stacy (1989–1997), who left to become chancellor of the Chattanooga campus of the University of Tennessee
- Alexander Gonzalez (1997–2003), previously the provost of the California State University, Fresno who left CSUSM to become president of the larger California State University, Sacramento
- Roy McTarnaghan (2003–2004), interim president
- Karen S. Haynes (2004–2019), former president of University of Houston–Victoria, who joined CSUSM in February 2004. In February 2019 she announced her intention to retire at the end of that academic year.
- Ellen Neufeldt (2019–current), formerly vice president of Old Dominion University, Neufeldt became president in July 2019
