= Alexander Gonzalez (businessman) =

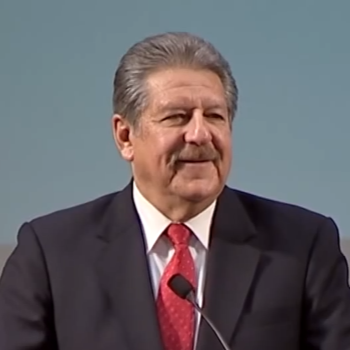
- Alexander Gonzalez delivering the 2014 Spring Address at Sacramento State
- Born: September 14, 1945 (age 81); Los Angeles, California, U.S.
- Occupation: University president
- Years active: 1997 – 2015
- Title: President/Professor Emeritus, Calif. State Univ., Sacramento
- Spouse: Gloria Martinez (m. 1971)
- Children: 2, Alejandro "Alex" Jr. and Michael

Academic background
- Education: Pomona College (B.A., History); Harvard Law School; Stanford University (Postdoc.)
- Alma mater: Univ. of California, Santa Cruz (M.S., Ph.D.)
- Academic advisor: Elliot Aronson

Academic work
- Discipline: Psychology
- Sub-discipline: Social psychology
- Institutions: California State University, Fresno; California State University, San Marcos
- Notable works: Desegregation, Jigsaw, and the Mexican-American Experience (1988)
- Website: cshe.berkeley.edu/people/alex-gonzalez-phd

Alexander Gonzalez (born September 14^{th}, 1945) was the 7th president of California State University, Sacramento (Sacramento State), serving from July 1^{st}, 2003 to June 30^{th}, 2015, after having held administrative positions at two other California State University campuses. His academic career began in 1983 as a professor of psychology at California State University, Fresno (Fresno State) for four years, followed by three years chairing that department, one as assistant to the president, and culminating in six years as the university's provost (from 1991 to 1997). He was named Interim President of California State University, San Marcos on June 25^{th}, 1997 as the California State University Board of Trustees rushed to respond to the sudden announcement of that institution's founding president's intention to depart only eight days earlier. Gonzalez was eventually rewarded with a permanent appointment to the position more than a year later after an exhaustive search of potential candidates, with the trustees saying "he earned it the old-fashioned way–through dedication and hard work."

== Education ==
After completing high school, his service in the United States Air Force from 1963–67 allowed him to utilize the G.I. Bill to earn his undergraduate degree in history at Pomona College, where he graduated with honors and was elected to Phi Beta Kappa. His master's and doctorate degrees in psychology are from University of California, Santa Cruz, where his mentor was Elliot Aronson. After graduate school, he spent a year at Stanford University as a postdoctoral fellow of the Ford Foundation and the National Research Council conducting research on the psychology of time. He also attended Harvard Law School.

== Awards and recognition ==
In 2007, he was inducted into East Los Angeles' Garfield High School's Hall of Fame. In 2008, he was named Asian Pacific Chamber of Commerce Community Honoree and the following year he was recognized as Businessman of the Year by the Sacramento Hispanic Chamber of Commerce.

In October 2012, President Gonzalez was awarded the Ohtli Award by the Mexican Government, the highest cultural honor for those of Mexican descent.

== Controversy ==
=== Vote of no confidence ===
On April 5, 2007, 464 out of 600 faculty members at Sacramento State, or 77%, approved a no-confidence referendum against Gonzalez amid the University's $6.5 million structural deficit at the time, and Gonzalez's proposed spending priorities which included increases in class sizes, shifts to academic funding that included reductions in full-time faculty, a lack of willingness to preserve the quality of the overall academic program, while simultaneously increasing funding into business-like ventures via University Enterprises, Inc. and his heavy use of top-down decision making. The non-binding faculty vote would have no effect on Gonzalez's presidency, a position served under the discretion of the CSU Chancellor. The faculty vote also recommended that "the Faculty direct the Faculty Senate to develop a list which sets forth specific actions that the President must take with respect to the matters raised in this resolutions in order to restore the quality of the instructional program and the Faculty's confidence in his leadership." Gonzalez's response to the vote created more tensions between the administration and faculty, "in the 28 years I have been a part of the California State University...I have yet to encounter the level of incivility, mean-spiritedness and outright distortion that I have found among some members of the Sacramento State community. It embarrasses and saddens me."

=== Attorney General's audit ===
In 2009, the state Attorney General's office began auditing Sacramento State's University Enterprises, Inc's (UEI) $35.3 million purchase of a building near the campus in 2007 using student fees. The California Faculty Association alleged mismanagement in how the building was purchased and the structure of its subsequent lease to Sacramento State. Though previously not a source of controversy for former administrations, the practice of having the university's president as ex officio Chairman of the UEI Board of Directors faced greater scrutiny during Gonzalez' leadership. UEI is an independent nonprofit organization was fully realized in 2005 as an investment arm that could sidestep restrictions and limitations placed on public organizations like the CSU's. Most significantly, auxiliaries like UEI are not subject to public records laws. Additionally, the Attorney General audit looked into a home loan for the purchase of President Gonzalez's House and a $27,000 commercial grade kitchen renovation project for the house in 2005. The audit found that "this kitchen renovation did inure to the benefit of a private individual (President Gonzalez), and therefore, was not a transaction that fell within UEI's charitable purposes. Due to depreciation by the time the audit was conducted, no legal action was pursued, but UEI was recommended to avoid any similar transactions. The audit was officially closed in 2010.

=== Exotic animal hunt ===
The Sacramento Bee reported in 2007 that a prominent local couple, Paul and Renee Snider, traveled to Tanzania twice to hunt 84 exotic species, including three species nearing or at risk of extinction for the university museum. In 2003, The Sniders were approached by the university to include their collection in an on-campus museum. In exchange for a pledge of $2.4 million donation for the effort, university president Alexander Gonzalez signed letters giving them special permission to hunt the animals not covered under a standard Tanzanian hunting license.

=== Salary increases ===
While a pay freeze was enforced upon faculty during most of Alexander Gonzalez's tenure. Pay increases continued for the administrators, including Gonzalez who would command the 5th highest salary in the CSU system by 2011. In 2007 Gonzalez received a $10,000 raise retroactive to July 2006, while in 2008-2009 Alexander Gonzalez received a raise to his perks and salaries by nearly 50 percent of his annual base salary of $295,000. Additional perks and benefits including housing, entertainment and travel stipends and benefits added up to an additional $145,405.15 for a total compensation of $440,405.11. That year he also received retirement contributions of $48,893.29. However, it wouldn't be until nearly seven years later in 2014, that Sacramento State faculty would receive a wage increase.

=== Family perks ===
In 2010, The Sacramento Bee reported on compensation from UEI's board, on which President Alexander Gonzalez sits, to his son Alex Jr., for a $72,000-a-year fundraising job beginning in 2005 and increasing to over $84,000. Additionally, Gonzalez's brother Francisco, was paid $3,000 to play a concert during a UEI sponsored event. An additional $1,500 was spent on CDs as a thank-you gift for the donors. The average musician the year prior was paid between $1,500 and $2,000.

=== Removal of the chickens ===
CSU Sacramento had previously played host to 40-60 free-ranging roosters and hens. Students often referenced love for the chickens, and the campus bookstore sold T-shirts and gear identifying the chickens as the campus's unofficial mascots. Shortly after Alexander Gonzalez's arrival, a 2004 CSU-wide policy gave the campus presidents authority to ban certain animals from campus. In the spring of 2004 the chicken population was quickly removed from the campus, sparking concerns over this disappearance and efforts by student and faculty groups to return the chickens to campus. Students and faculty speculated that the new President's ambitious campus fundraising and modernizing "Destination 2010" plans were the reason behind the sudden disappearance. Alexander Gonzalez never officially acknowledged giving orders for the removal of the chickens; however, Chancellor Reed indicated that Gonzalez felt it was time for the chickens to be removed for health concerns.
