= Kimberly Dark =

American sociologist and performance artist

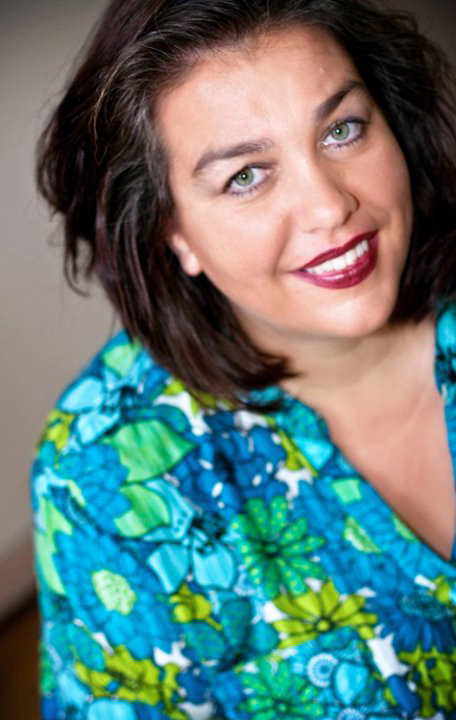
- Born: August 12, 1968; San Diego, California
- Occupations: Writer, sociologist, performance artist, poet
- Children: 1
- Writing career
- Subjects: Social Inequality, LGBT, Gender, Feminism, Sexuality
- Website: www.kimberlydark.com

Kimberly Dark (August 12, 1968) is an American author, professor of sociology, and storyteller.

== Life ==
Dark was born in San Diego, California in 1968. She received a B.A. from University of Colorado, Colorado Springs in 1989, an M.A. in sociology from Cal State San Marcos in 1998, and a Ph.D. in sociology from the University of Portsmouth in the United Kingdom in 2025. She began her work as a storyteller and performance artist in 1998. She had previously set up Current Change Consulting, a firm specializing in coalition-building facilitation, conflict resolution, and qualitative research.

Her current work uses sociological perspectives and first person storytelling to discuss ways humans organize social life – through gender, race, class, and sexuality (among others). Her trainings, lectures and writings use humor to reveal the makeup of privilege and oppression, as the purpose is to prompt change. Her work has been produced at colleges and universities in North America and Europe, and at theaters, festivals, conferences and other events worldwide.

Dark taught in a graduate program in sociological practice at Cal State San Marcos until 2023.

== Work ==
In 2010, Campus Pride, an American non-profit organization that promotes LGBTQ leaders on University campuses, named Dark in the "Top 25 'Best of the Best' LGBT speakers, performers [who] raise awareness of inclusion, visibility on college campuses nationally."

Her first book of poetry, Love and Errors, was published in 2018, and is a book of narrative poetry that uses both personal and fictional accounts to explore themes of love, gender roles, violence, and survival.

Her novel The Daddies was released on October 21, 2018. As a love letter to masculinity, and an indictment of patriarchy.

Her collection of essays Fat, Pretty, and Soon to Be Old was released on September 13, 2019. This collection explores appearance hierarchy.

Her next collection of essays, Damaged, Like Me was released on June 29, 2021, and aims to build roads to a more equitable and loving collective culture of body sovereignty, racial justice, and gender liberation.

Her newest poetry book, Motherlode, will be published October 1st, 2026 (Indolent Books). The collection is about mother-daughter relationships, problematic parenting, and Alzheimer's care and decline.

=== Publications ===
- "Roadside, Perris CA" (Visible: A Femmethology 2008)
- "Examining Praise from the Audience: What does it mean to be a 'successful' poet-researcher." (Poetic Inquiry 2009)
- "Parting, Renewal" and "Famous Poet" (San Diego Poetry Annual 2009)
- "My Son is a Straight A Student" (Poetic Inquiry: Vibrant Voices in the Social Sciences 2009)
- "Can’t We Stop Acting As If Queer Parenting Is Something New?" (Ms. Magazine: April 3, 2013)
- "Why You Should Love and Hate the Louis CK 'Fat Girl Rant' -- and What to Do About It" (Huffington Post: May 22, 2014)
- "A Modern Family Goes on Vacation, and Leaves Their Clothes Behind" (Narratively: October 28, 2015
- "What Is Fempathizing? 5 Ways to Recognize This Act of Internalized Sexism" (everyday feminism: October 1, 2015)
- "Ways of Being in Teaching" (Sense Publishers 2017)
- "5 Ways to Be Inclusive When Teaching or Practicing Yoga" (Everyday Feminism: February 10, 2017)
- "Why ‘What Does Your Tattoo Mean?’ Is a Bigger Question Than You Might Think" (Everyday Feminism" April 11, 2017)
- "6 Things White People Can Do To Reach Friends and Family Members to End Racism" (Everyday Feminism: August 15, 2017)
- Love and Errors (May 22, 2018)
- "Tiny Love Stories: 'Plenty of Parents Don't Like Their Children" (New York times)
- The Daddies (October 21, 2018)
- "Does It Actually Matter When a New Life Begins?" (Medium: May 27, 2019
- "When Mindfulness Feels Forced" (Yoga International online)
- "Celebrating Body Diversity Among Students—And Teachers Too!" (Yoga International online)
- "Planes Weren’t Built for Big People Like Me. Here’s What I Want My Seatmates to Know." (Time Magazine: September 2019)
- "Fat, Pretty, and Soon to Be Old" (September 24, 2019)
- "Taking the Shame Out of Fat-Shaming" (Yes! Magazine: November 26, 2019)
- "Video Meetings Create New Challenges for Women" (Ms. Magazine: 5/13/2020)
- "What to Do About Weight Gain During the Pandemic" (Ms. Magazine: 7/10/2020)
- “Your Fruit Bowl is (Reasonably) Safe” (The Rumpus: June 14, 2021)
- "Damaged, Like Me" (June 29, 2021)
- "Damaged, Like My Son" (Mutha Magazine: October 19th, 2021
- "Makeout Lessons" (Gertrude Press)
- "A Queer ‘Coolcation’ In Seattle" (Go Magazine: August 21, 2024)
- "Where to Play, Eat, and Stay During Pride San Antonio" (Matador Network: June 10, 2025
- "Where to Play, Eat, and Stay in Winston-Salem, North Carolina" (Matador Network: July 16, 2025
- "Motherlode" coming soon (October 1, 2026)

=== Discography ===
- You Are My Singing Lesson, Eko Records, 2002
- Location Is Everything, Durga Sound Studio, 2008

=== Performances ===
- The Butch Femme Chronicles: Discussions With Women Who Are Not Like Me (and Some Who Are) (1998)
- Public Contact (1999)
- True Confessions of a Lesbian Diva (2000)
- Stripped and Teased: Scandalous Stories With Subversive Subplots (2005)
- Dykeotomy (2009)
- Things I Learned from Fat People on the Plane (2017)

== See also ==
- LGBT
- Fat acceptance movement
- Women's studies
- Feminism
- Performance art
- Fresh Fruit Festival
